= Wawel Castle =

Castle in Kraków, Poland

Wawel Royal Castle
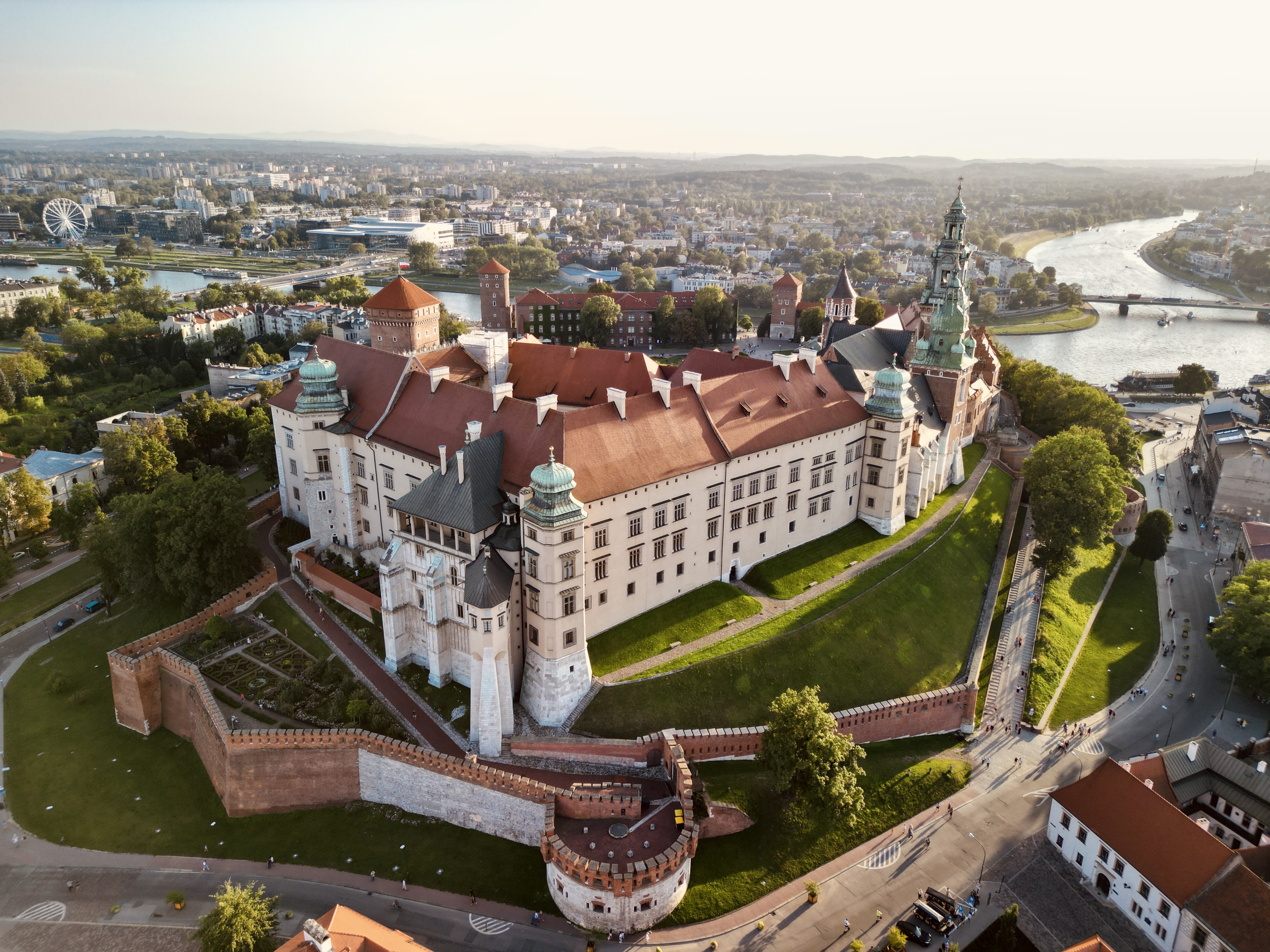
- The Wawel Hill, with the cathedral on the right and the castle on the left.

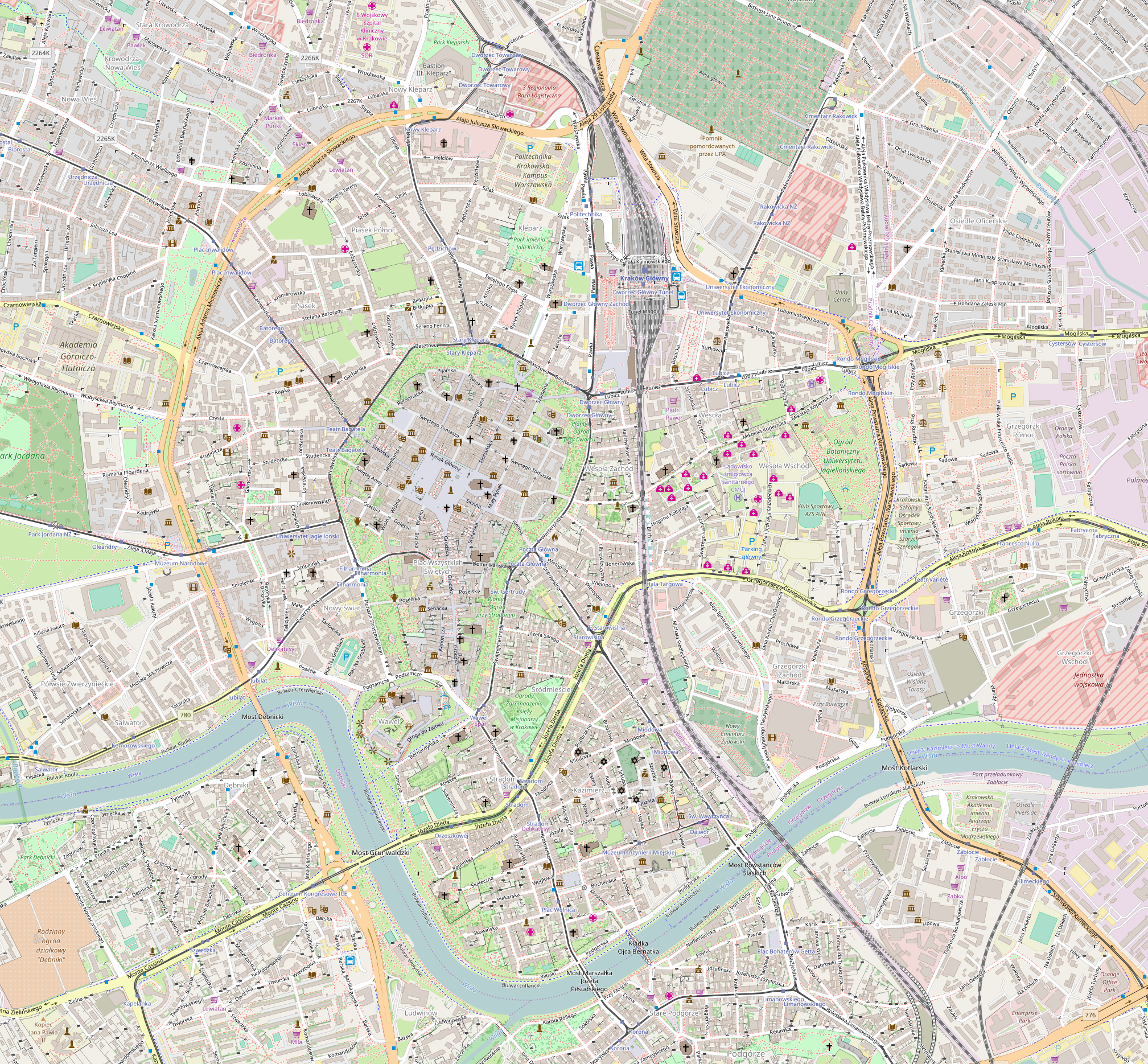
- Location within Central Kraków Location within Poland
- 50°03′14″N 19°56′05″E
- Type: Castle residency
- Location: Kraków; Poland

History
- Built: 13th and 14th centuries

Site notes
- Area: 7,040 m^{2} (0.704 ha)
- Architectural styles: Romanesque, Gothic, Renaissance, Early Baroque
- Visitors: 3,477,951 (in 2025)
- Website: Official Website

UNESCO World Heritage Site
- Type: Cultural
- Criteria: iv
- Designated: 1978
- Part of: Historic Centre of Kraków
- Reference no.: 29
- Region: Europe and North America

Historic Monument of Poland
- Designated: 1994-09-08
- Part of: Kraków historical city complex
- Reference no.: M.P. 1994 nr 50 poz. 418

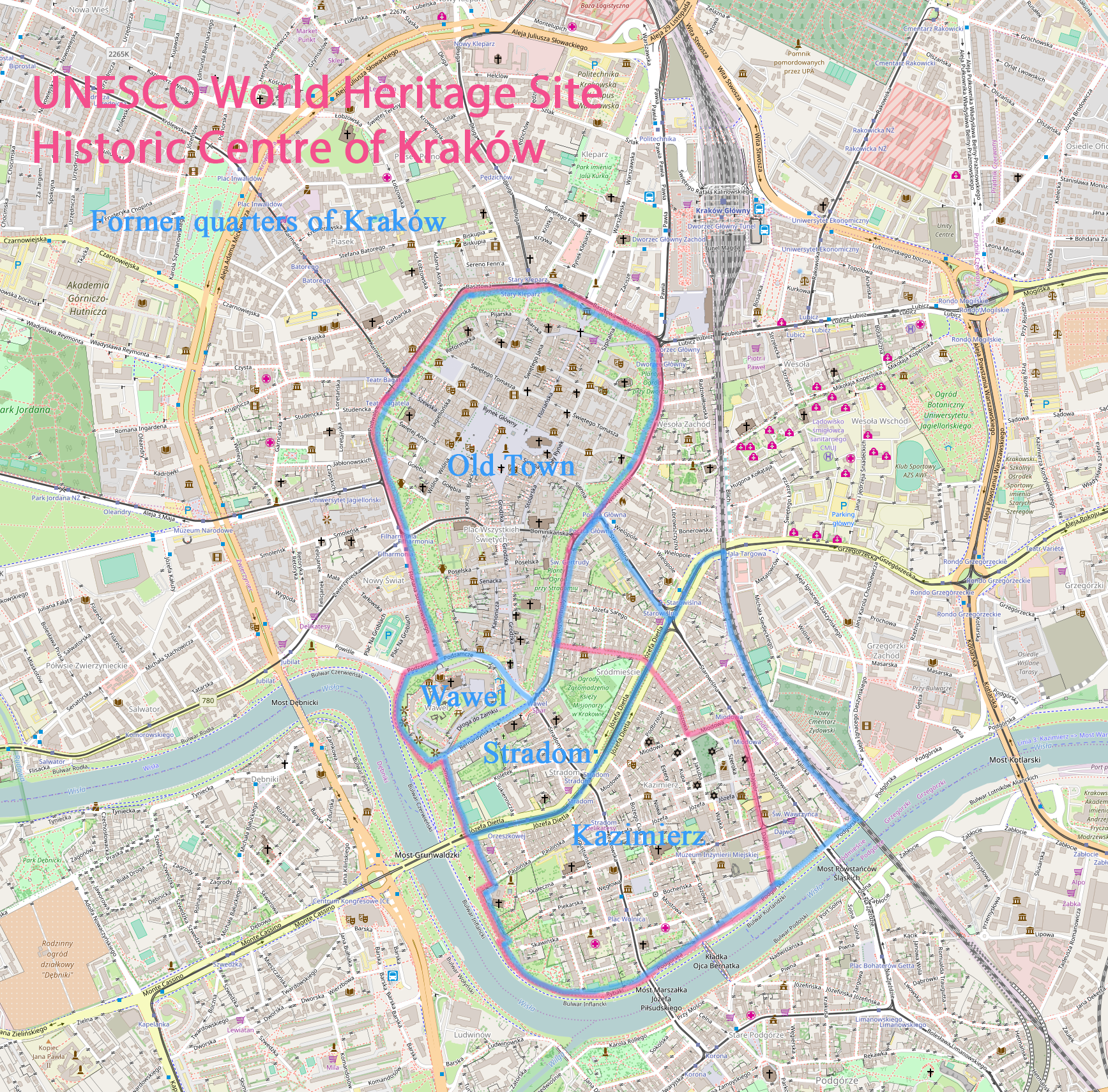
Wawel, part of the Historic Centre of Kraków UNESCO World Heritage Site

The Wawel Royal Castle (Polish pronunciation: [ˈvavɛl]; Zamek Królewski na Wawelu) and the Wawel Hill on which it sits constitute the most historically and culturally significant site in Poland. A fortified residency on the Vistula River in Kraków, it was established on the orders of King Casimir III the Great and enlarged over the centuries into a number of structures around a Polish Renaissance courtyard. It represents nearly all European architectural styles of the Medieval, Renaissance and Baroque periods. With over 3.47 million visitors in 2025, Wawel Castle is the most visited art museum in Poland and the 14th most visited art museum in the world.

The castle is part of a fortified architectural complex erected atop a limestone outcrop on the left bank of the Vistula River, at an altitude of 228 metres (748 ft) above sea level. The complex consists of numerous buildings of great historical and national importance, including the Wawel Cathedral where Polish monarchs were crowned and buried. Some of Wawel's oldest stone buildings can be traced back to 970 CE, in addition to the earliest examples of Romanesque and Gothic architecture in Poland. The current castle was built in the 14th century, and expanded over the next hundreds of years. In 1978, Wawel was declared the first World Heritage Site as part of the Historic Centre of Kraków.

For centuries the residence of the kings of Poland and the symbol of Polish statehood, Wawel Castle is now one of the country's premier art museums. Established in 1930, the museum encompasses ten curatorial departments responsible for collections of paintings, including an important collection of Italian Renaissance paintings, prints, sculpture, textiles, among them the Sigismund II Augustus tapestry collection, goldsmith's work, arms and armor, ceramics, Meissen porcelain, and period furniture. The museum's holdings in oriental art include the largest collection of Ottoman tents in Europe. With seven specialized conservation studios, the museum is also an important center for the conservation of works of art.

== Early history ==
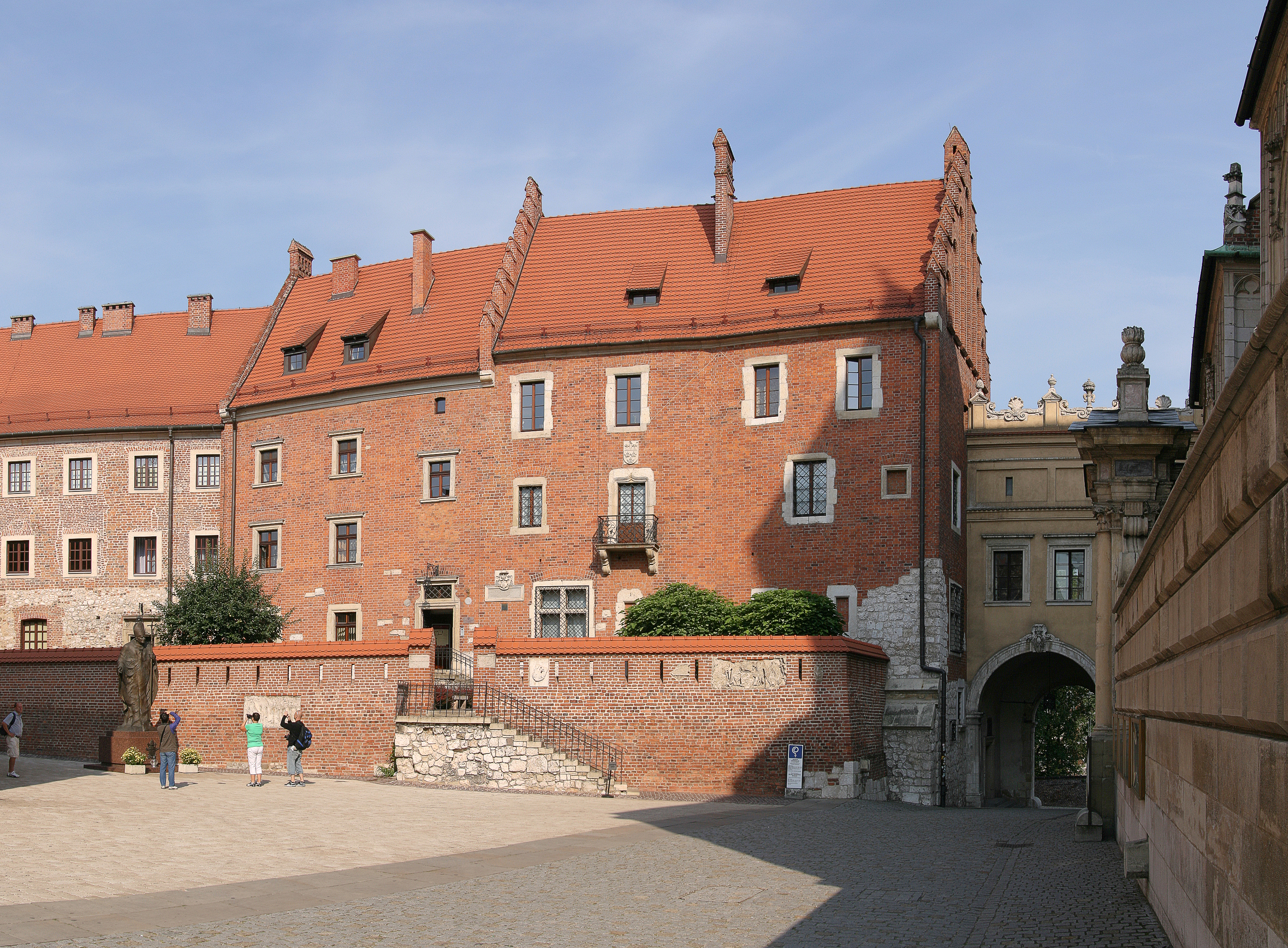
An older section of Wawel from the 14th century, now the Cathedral Museum.

The history of Wawel is deeply intertwined with the history of the Polish lands and Polish royal dynasties already in the Middle Ages. The political and dynastic tensions that led to the ascendance of Kraków as the royal seat are sophisticated, but for most of the Middle Ages and the Renaissance Wawel was the seat of the national government and the Diet (assembly). As the Polish–Lithuanian Commonwealth formed and grew, Wawel became the seat of one of Europe's largest and most important states. This status was only lost when the capital was moved to Warsaw in 1596 (designated officially in 1793).

The Wawel, medieval plan with the rebuilding work of 1502 to 1544 outlined in red. Key: 1: Residential tower; 2(0): well; 3: kitchen; 4: kitchen; 5: ambulatory; 6: rotunda of Saints Feliksa and Audakta; 7: Chapel of St Mary of Egypt; 8: Lower gate; 9: Upper gate; 10: Wawel Cathedral; 11: Keep 12: Danish tower; 13: Hen's foot tower.

From the late 18th century, when Poland lost its independence during the period of foreign partitions, Wawel became a symbol of endurance and was the setting for demonstrations and gatherings of Krakowians protesting against the continuing foreign occupation by the Austrian, Prussian, and the Russian Empires. Thus, the significance of the Wawel Hill comes in part from its combination of political and religious significance. The Cathedral holds the relics of St. Stanislaus and stands directly adjacent to the Royal Castle. The Hill has a long history of religious functions; some of the oldest extant architectural remains are those of the Rotunda of the Virgin Mary.

The hill which takes the form of a horst originated in the Miocene epoch (23–25 million years ago) and consists of Jurassic limestone dating back to the Oxfordian age (155–161 million years ago). This limestone is strongly karsted and abounds in caves (e.g. the Dragon's Den—Smocza Jama). This possibly explains why the hill was originally called "wąwel", meaning ravine in Polish. This ravine once divided the hill. An alternative theory is that the word means 'protrusion from the marshes' which surrounded the hill. However, the most recent theory is that "Wawel" is a regular continuation of the name Babel in the Greek language (the consonant [B] followed by [V]/[W]).

The Wawel Hill has archaeological remains indicating settlement from the 4th century. Archaeological studies suggest that the earliest settlement dates back to the Middle Paleolithic era, c. 100,000 years BC and owed its rapid development to its location being the crossing of a number of key trading routes. Wawel is believed to be one of the strongholds of the Vistulan tribe which formed a nation at the turn of the 8th and 9th century AD. Its legendary rulers Krakus and Princess Wanda, who are said to have lived in the 7th and 8th centuries, are mentioned by the 13th-century chronicler Wincenty Kadłubek. In the 10th century, the Vistulans' lands and Kraków became part of the emerging state of Poland.

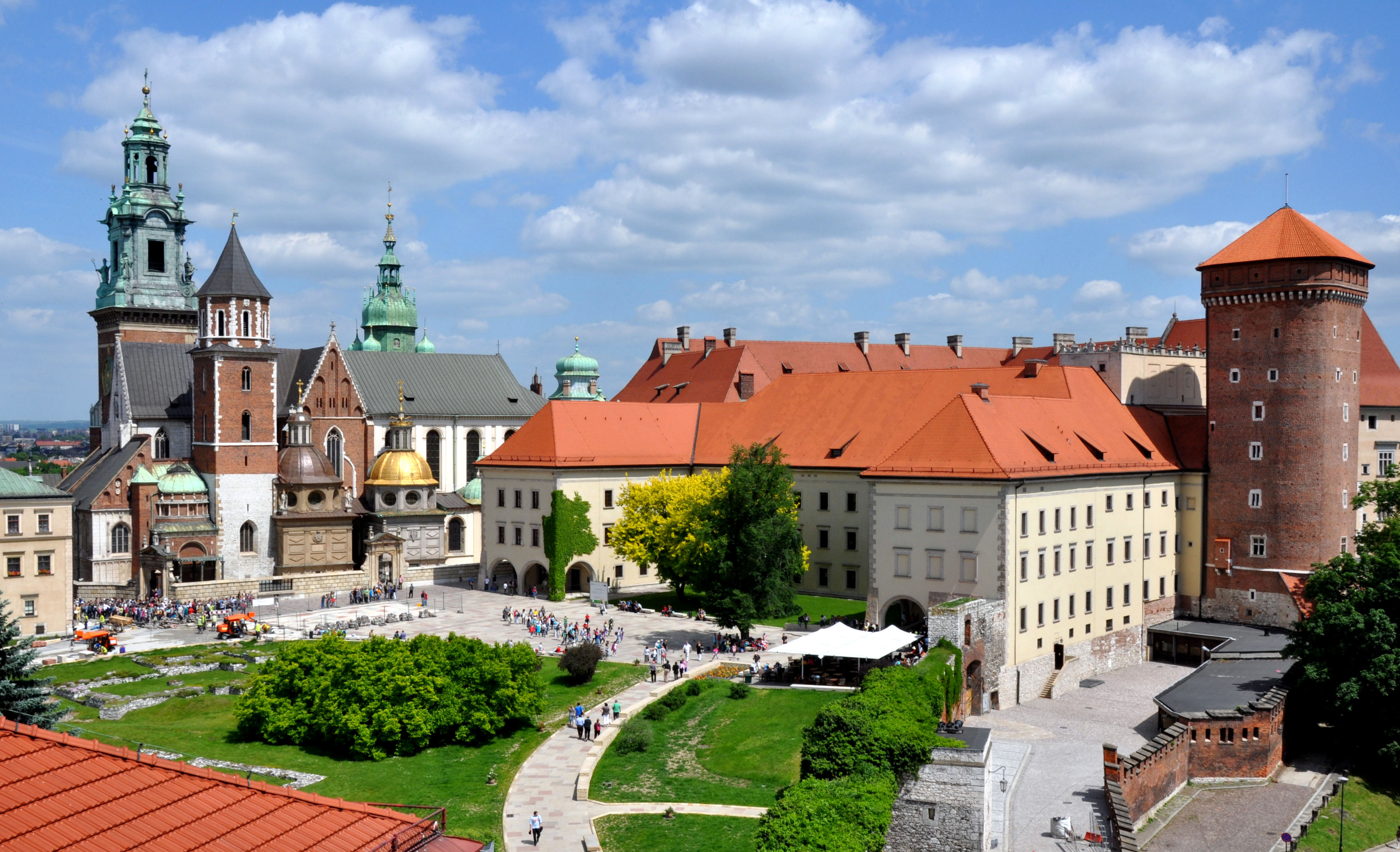
The Wawel complex, with the Cathedral on the left and Castle to the right. Over centuries, various styles of architecture have evolved side by side.

In the year 1000, the Kraków diocese was established followed by the construction of a Cathedral – the seat of the bishop. However, as a result of an ongoing conflict with the Holy Roman Empire, construction did not begin until the signing of the Peace of Bautzen, in 1018. Only minor fragments remain of the original cathedral (which is sometimes called 'Chrobrowska' after Bolesław I the Brave) and despite extensive archaeological research, it has proved impossible to reconstruct its exterior. Until the 1980s, relicts of St Gereon's Church were identified with the first cathedral but this theory, advanced by Adolf Szyszko-Bohusz, has been disproved by more recent research. There are also inconsistencies in the dating of the destruction of the original cathedral. Some sources place this at the time of the invasion of Bretislaus I of Bohemia in the 1040s, while others date the destruction to a fire in the 1080s.

In addition to the cathedral, the hill was also the site of other building work. The earliest evidence is of wooden structures dating from the 9th century, with the earliest stone buildings dating to the 10th and 11th centuries; the remains of the following buildings date from this era: the Rotunda of the Blessed Virgin Mary – probably from the turn of the 10th and 11th century; Church B (the earliest parts originate from the 10th century); Church of St Gereon (probably the palace chapel); the Church of St. George; the Church of St Michael; the Twenty-Four Pillar Room (possibly part of the Ducal Mansion); the Keep and the Residential Tower.

=== Wawel dragon ===
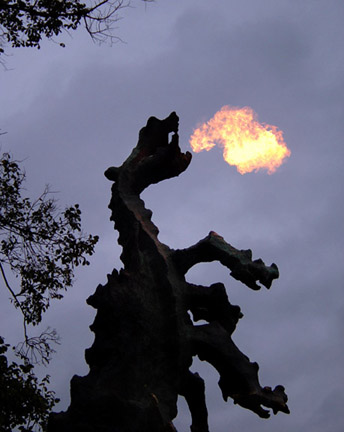
Smok Wawelski, Wawel's legendary dragon

From this early period of the Wawel's history originates the popular and enduring Polish myth of the Wawel Dragon. Today, it is commemorated on the lower slopes of the Wawel Hill where by the river, is a modern fire-breathing metal statue of the dragon. The statue is sited in front of Smocza Jama (Dragon's Den), one of the limestone caves scattered over the hill. The dragon, Smok Wawelski, was a mystical beast which supposedly terrorised the local community, eating their sheep and local virgins, before (according to one version) being heroically slain by Krakus, a legendary Polish prince, who supposedly founded the city of Kraków and built his palace above the slain dragon's lair. The oldest known literary reference to the Wawel dragon comes from the 12th century, in the work by Wincenty Kadłubek.

== Medieval period ==
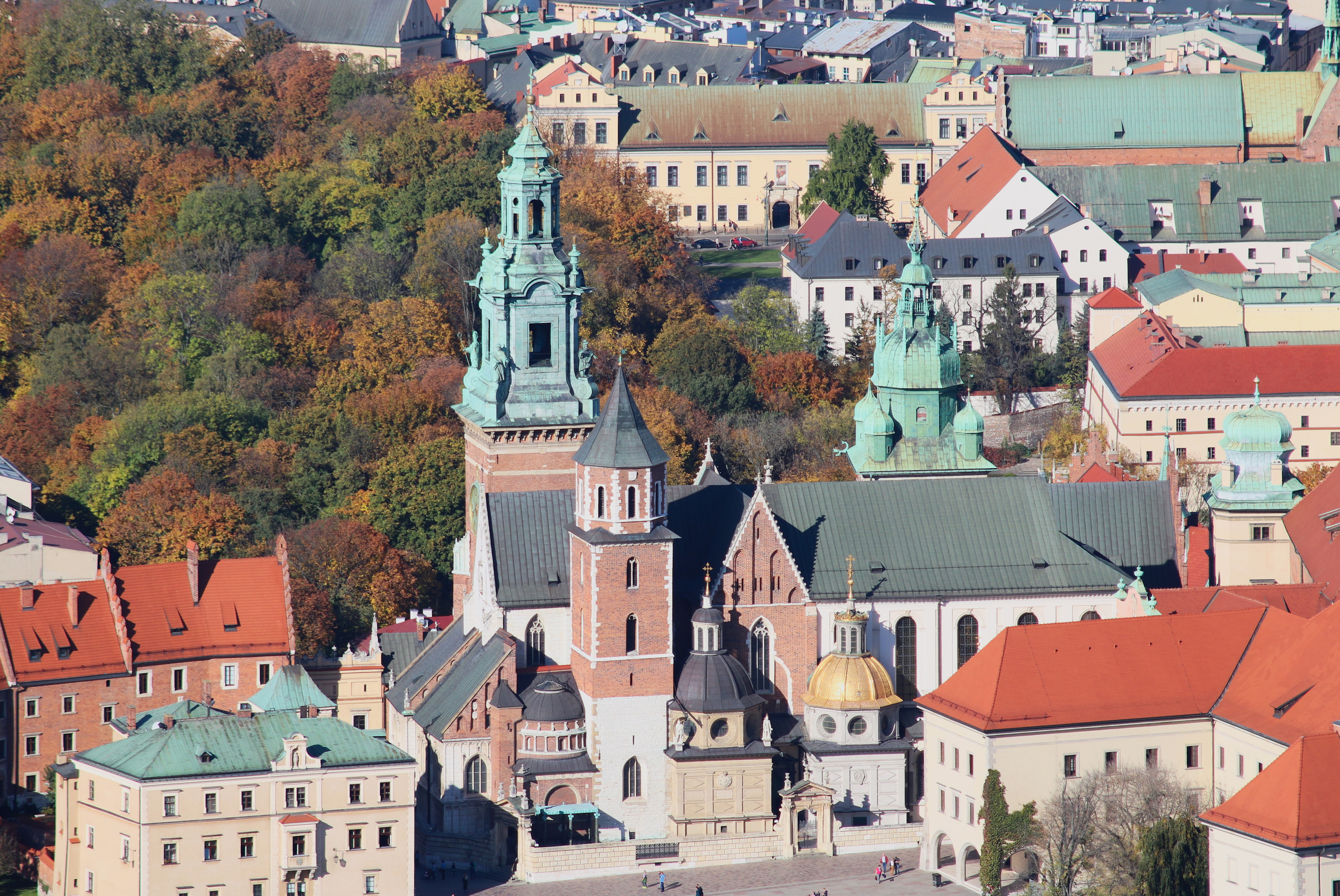
Wawel Cathedral—the Silver Bell Tower with a coned roof and Sigismund Chapel with a small golden dome.

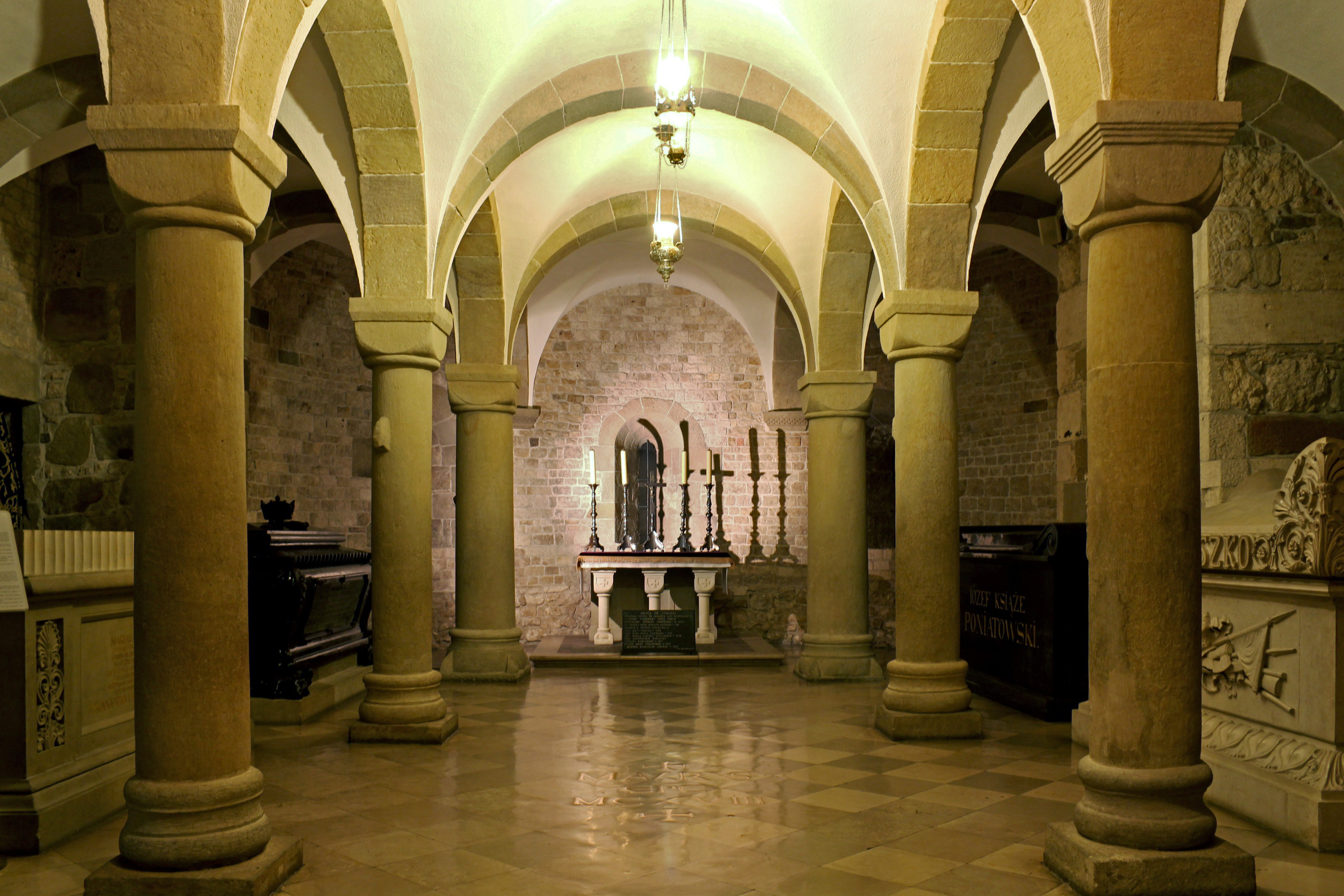
St. Leonard's Crypt below the cathedral survives from an older church built in the 11th century.

=== Romanesque (11th–12th centuries) ===
Between 1038 and 1039 Duke Casimir I the Restorer returned to Poland and it's believed that Kraków first became a royal residence and the capital of Poland at this time.

At the end of the 11th century, construction work began on a replacement cathedral, today called "Hermanowska" as it's likely that Władysław I Herman was its patron. The new cathedral was consecrated in 1142. Quite a lot is known about the building because an image of it is engraved on a 13th-century chapterhouse seal, and some of its remains and foundations are well preserved; besides the lower 12 metres (39 feet) of the Silver Bell Tower, the trinavel St. Leonard's Crypt, the rotunda by the Bastion of Ladislaus IV of Hungary (once a baptistery and the rotunda by the Sandomierska Tower all date from this era, as does a church near the Dragon's Cave.

In 1118 Bishop Maurus was buried in the crypt. The paten and the chalice, buried with the bishop, were later exhumed from his tomb during its accidental discovery in 1938.

==== Silver Bell Tower ====
The Silver Bell Tower (originally known as the Wikaryjska or Priest Tower) dates from the early 12th century and is the oldest of the Wawel's many towers. However, the tower has many later additions and only the 12-metre-high rectangular base can be dated as belonging to the 11th-century Hermanowska Cathedral. The belfry was constructed in the final quarter of the 14th century and the spire in 1769. The tower contains three bells; the largest was made in 1423, the next largest around 1271 and the smallest in 1669. In the foundations of the tower is a burial vault containing the remains of notable Poles from all periods of history. Other notables are also buried at the nearby Skałka Church.

=== Gothic (13th–15th centuries) ===
==== Wawel Cathedral ====
Around 1305 to 1306, the Hermanowska Cathedral was partially destroyed by a fire; however, the coronation of King Władysław I the Elbow-high, in 1320, was still able to take place within its precincts. In the same year construction of a third cathedral, consecrated in 1364, began at the King's behest, the key elements of this cathedral are preserved today.

Wawel Cathedral and its subsidiary chapels: 1: Sigismund Tower; 2: Treasury 3: Czartoryski Chapel & Clock Tower; 4: Vestibule; 5: Maciejowski Chapel; 6: Lipskis' Chapel; 7: Skotnicki Chapel; 8: Zebrzydowski Chapel; 9: Sacristy; 10: Gamrat Chapel; 11: St Mary's Chapel; 12: Tomicki Chapel; 13: Załuski Chapel; 14: Chapel of King John I Albert; 15: Zadzik Chapel; 16: Konarski Chapel; 17: Sigismund Chapel; 18: Vasa Chapel; 19: Szafraniecs' Chapel & Silver Bells Tower; 20: Potocki Chapel; 21: Chapel of the Holy Cross; 22: Chapel of Queen Sophia; 23: Shrine of St Stanislaus; 24: The High Altar

The cathedral is trinavel in construction and surrounded by side-chapels, added in later centuries. The earliest of these chapels were built off the chancel; St Margarita's chapel was consecrated (today it acts as a sacristy) in 1322 and few years the chapel, later to be known as the Báthory Chapel, was completed. The cathedral's west entrance is flanked by two chapels; one dedicated to Queen Sophia (last wife of Władysław II Jagiełło) and the second to the Holy Cross; these were built during the reign of Casimir IV Jagiellon (1440–1492); the former is notable for its polychrome vaulted ceiling. From the close of the 15th century, a further nineteen side-chapels were built or rebuilt.

Władysław I the Elbow-high was the first king to be buried in the cathedral in 1333. His sandstone sarcophagus was set up by his son and successor, Casimir III the Great, the last King of Poland from the Piast dynasty. The cathedral also contains the tombs of Casimir III the Great and Jogaila but the most precious is that of Casimir IV Jagiellon, carved by Veit Stoss in 1492. The late Gothic tombstone of John I Albert was carved at the beginning of the 16th century and is attributed to Jorg Huber. The cathedral also contains memorials to Stephen Báthory and bishop Fillip Padniewski – both designed by Santi Gucci and also the tombstone of bishop Andrzej Zebrzydowski designed by Jan Michalowicz from Urzedow. During the 20th century, the cathedral became the site of Karol Wojtyla's priesthood ordination in 1946 and bishop ordination in 1958 as Kraków's auxiliary bishop.

==== Secular buildings ====
Little is known of the first royal residences at the Wawel until Casimir III the Great, who reigned from 1333 until 1370, had a Gothic castle erected next to the cathedral; this consisted of multiple structures situated around a central courtyard. In the 14th century, it was rebuilt by King Władysław II Jagiełło (also known as Jogaila) and Queen Jadwiga of Poland. The Hen's Foot Tower, built upon three projecting buttresses resembling a chicken foot, and the Danish Tower date from their reigns, as do the Jadwiga and Jogaila Chamber, in which the Polish coronation sword (Szczerbiec) is exhibited.

During this period, the Wawel began to take its present appearance and size as further buildings were developed on the hill to serve as quarters for the numerous clergy, royal clerks, troops, servants and craftsmen; this work included defensive walls, ramparts and the 'Jordanka,' 'Lubranka,' 'Sandomierska,' 'Tęczyńska,' 'Szlachecka,' 'Złodziejska' and 'Panieńska' towers.

== Renaissance and Baroque period (16th and 17th centuries) ==
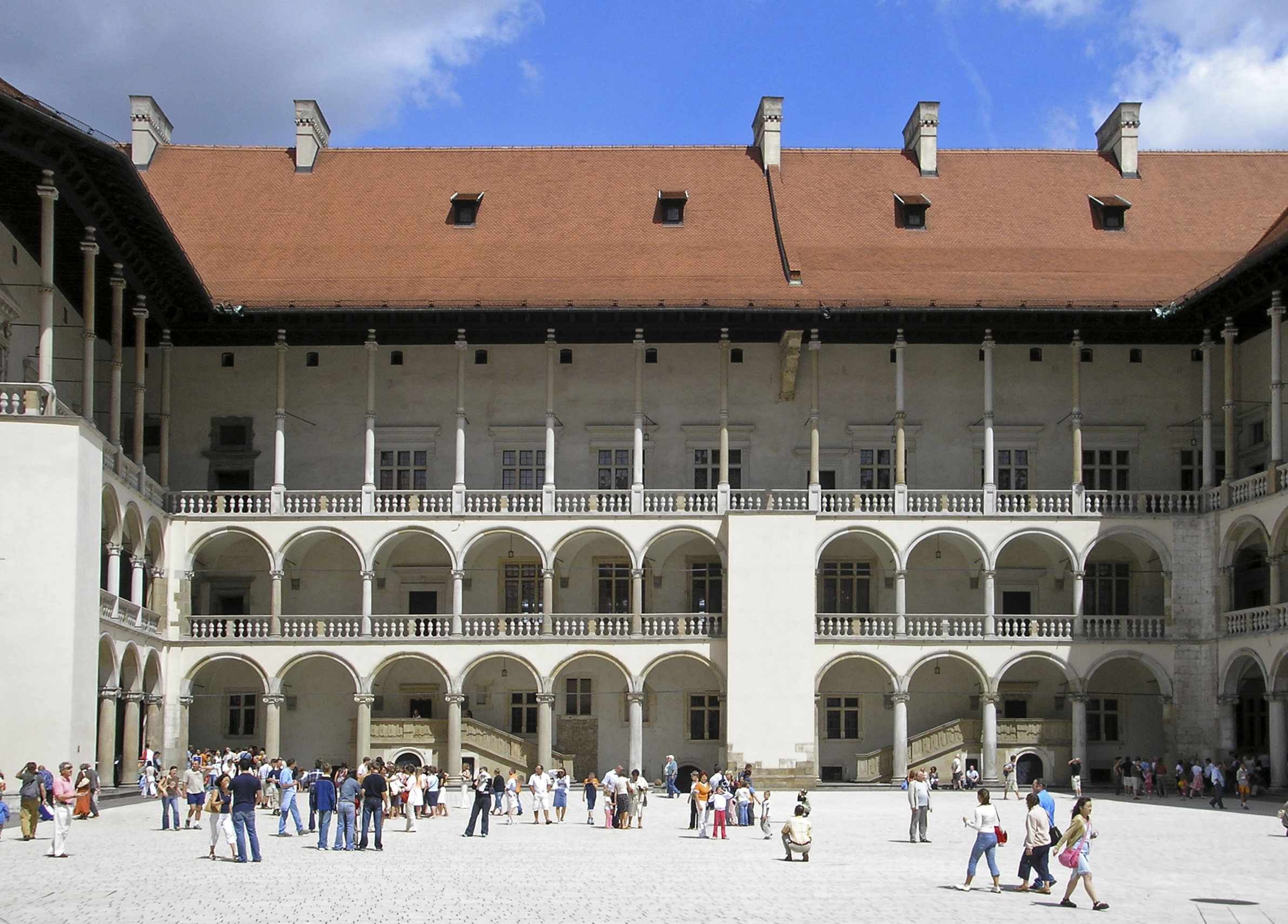
The tiered arcades of Sigismund I the Old in the Polish Renaissance courtyard within Wawel Castle

The reign of the penultimate member of the Jagiellonian dynasty, Sigismund I the Old, was a high point in Wawel fortunes. Following another fire in 1499, from 1507 to 1536, Sigismund rebuilt the royal residence. King Sigismund had spent part of his youth at the court of his brother, King Vladislaus of Hungary and Bohemia in Buda; this court has a small band of Italian artisans pioneering the Renaissance movement, at that time little known outside of Florence. Thus inspired Sigismund took the decision to rebuild in the Renaissance style within the walls of the old castle. A great influence on the king was his second wife, Italian-born Bona Sforza. She brought in the best native and foreign artists including Italian architects, sculptors, and Polish and German decorators, to refurbish the castle into a splendid Renaissance palace.

Work on the new avant-garde palace was initially supervised by two artisans from Italy: Francisco from Florence and Bartolommeo Berrecci, and after their deaths by Benedykt from Sandomierz. A feature of the rebuilding were the large, light rooms which open from tiered arcades lining a courtyard. The new rooms and halls included the ornate Deputy Hall with its coffered ceiling, exemplifying the skills of both Italian and Polish craftsmen. To decorate the palace's rooms, Sigismund (and later his son) purchased over 350 tapestries, collectively known as the Jagiellonian tapestries; they were woven in the Netherlands and Flanders; many based on designs by Michiel Coxie.

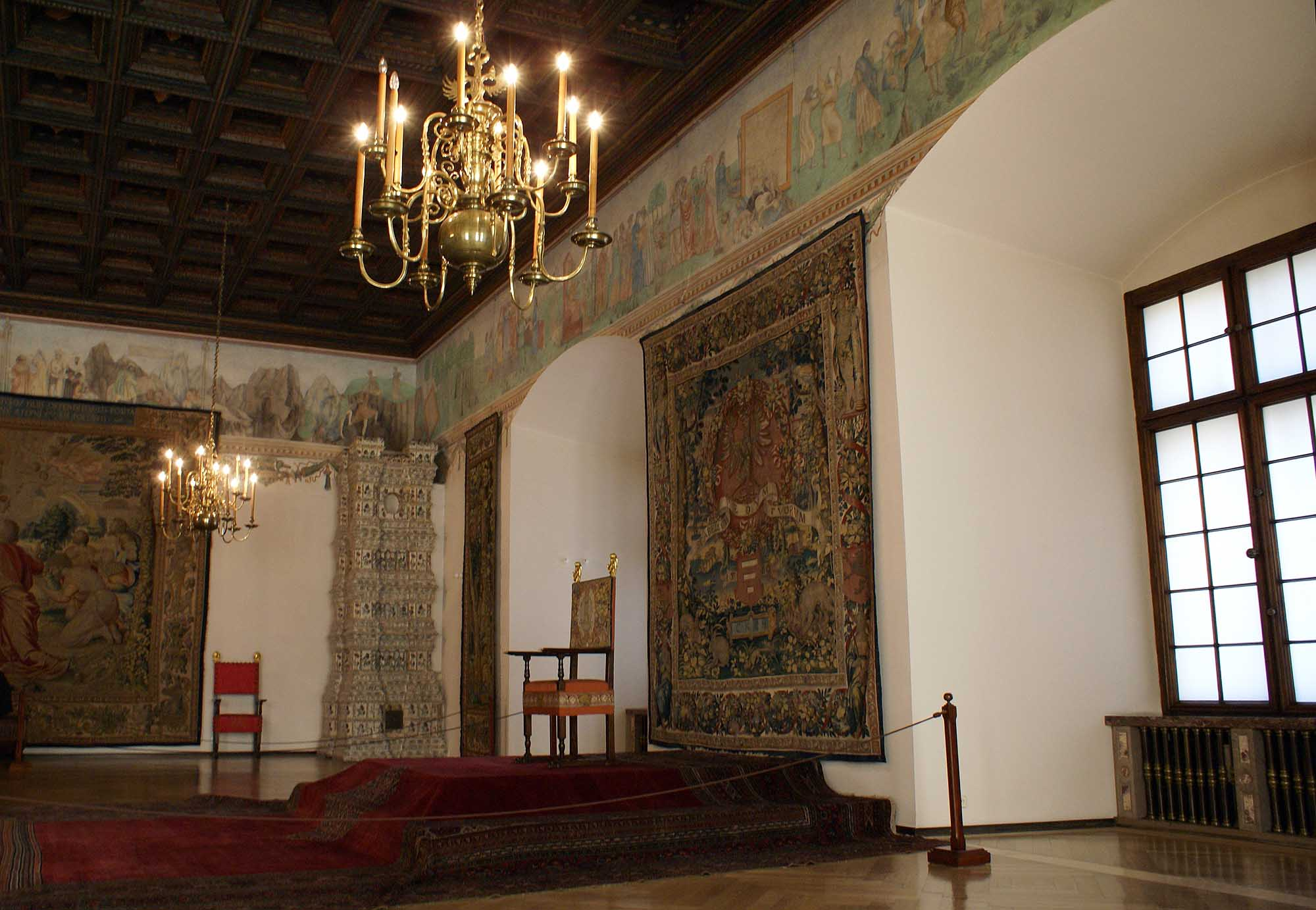
One of the State Rooms with Jagiellonian tapestries.

While the arcaded courtyard is considered a fine example of Renaissance art, it has subtle eccentricities—hints of Polish Gothic within its form, a steeply hipped and projecting roof (necessary in a northern climate) counterbalancing the soaring effect created by the uppermost arcade being higher than those below (a feature unknown in Italy) to give the courtyard a uniquely Polish renaissance look. The extra height of the uppermost arcade is truly unusual as it indicates and places the piano nobile on the third floor, whereas the rules of Italian Renaissance architecture place it on the second floor; again this indicates that while the design was inspired by Italians, the Polish artistic and cultural tradition was not extinguished in the execution.

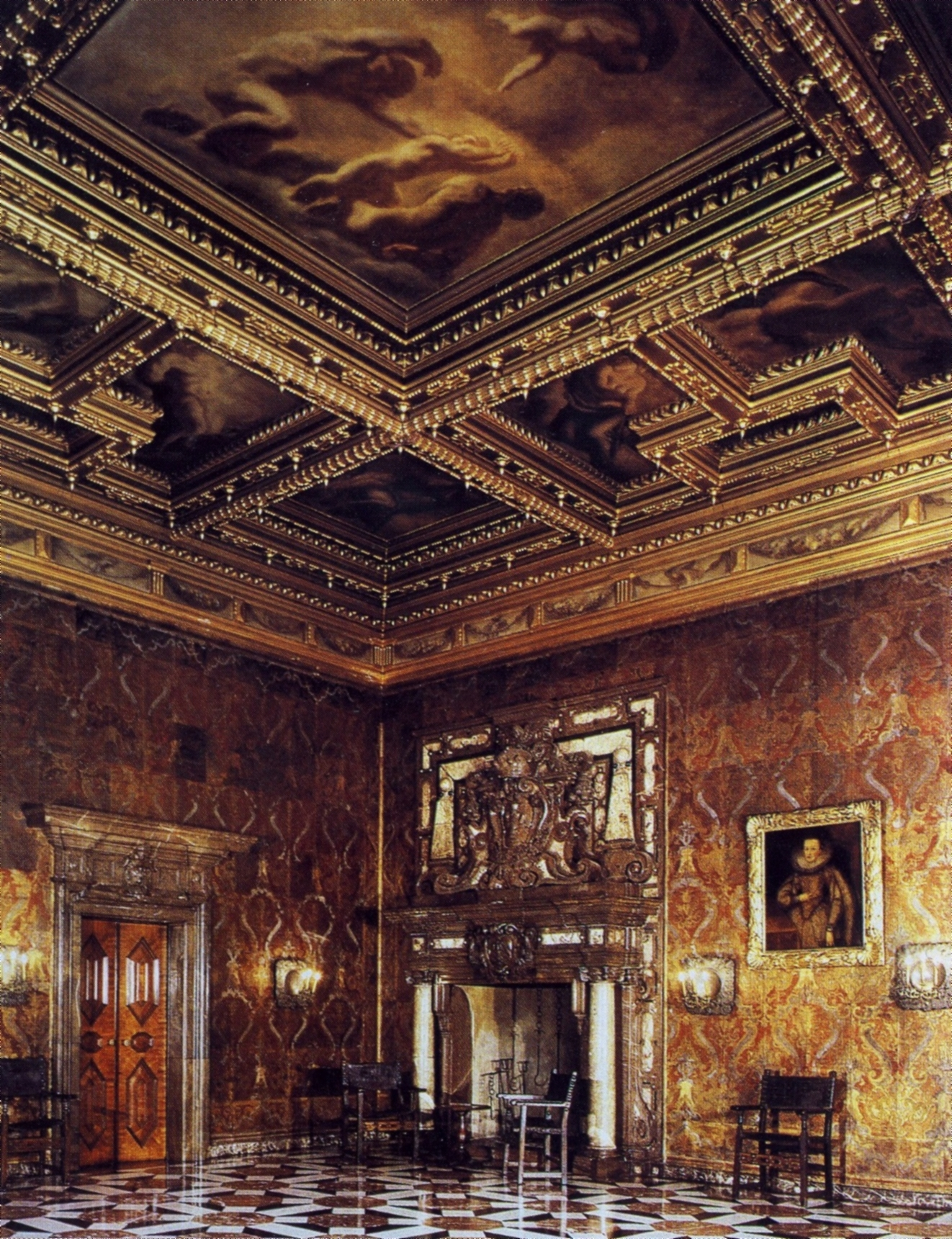
A monumental coffered plafond in the Bird Room and fireplace of Sigismund III designed by Giovanni Trevano.

After a fire in 1595 when the north-east part of the castle burned down, King Sigismund III Vasa decided to have it rebuilt with the work carried out under the direction of the Italian architect Giovanni Trevano. The Senator Stairs and the fireplace in the Bird Room date from this period. However, the castle still retains many of the earlier interiors designed by Berrecci. While many have been altered through neglect, war damage and, after World War II, through overenthusiastic restoration, the spirit of Berrecci's Renaissance ideals mingled with the Gothic motifs of local craftsmen still remains. The Ambassadors' Hall still retains much of its timber carving, most notable its coffered ceiling with thirty Gothic style carved heads by Sebastian Tauerbach.

In the 17th century, Wawel became an important defensive point and was modernised and heavily fortified. Later, the transfer of power to Warsaw did not change the symbolic role and importance of the Wawel Cathedral, which was still the place of royal coronations.

During this period, many changes were introduced in the cathedral – the high altar was remodelled, the cloister was elevated and the Shrine of St Stanislaus (a marble altar and a silver coffin) and the Vasa Chapel were constructed. Baroque memorials were also erected, among others were tombs to bishops Marcin Szyszkowski, Piotr Gembicki, Jan Małachowski, Kazimierz Lubieński and kings Michael I and John III Sobieski.

=== Sigismund's Chapel ===
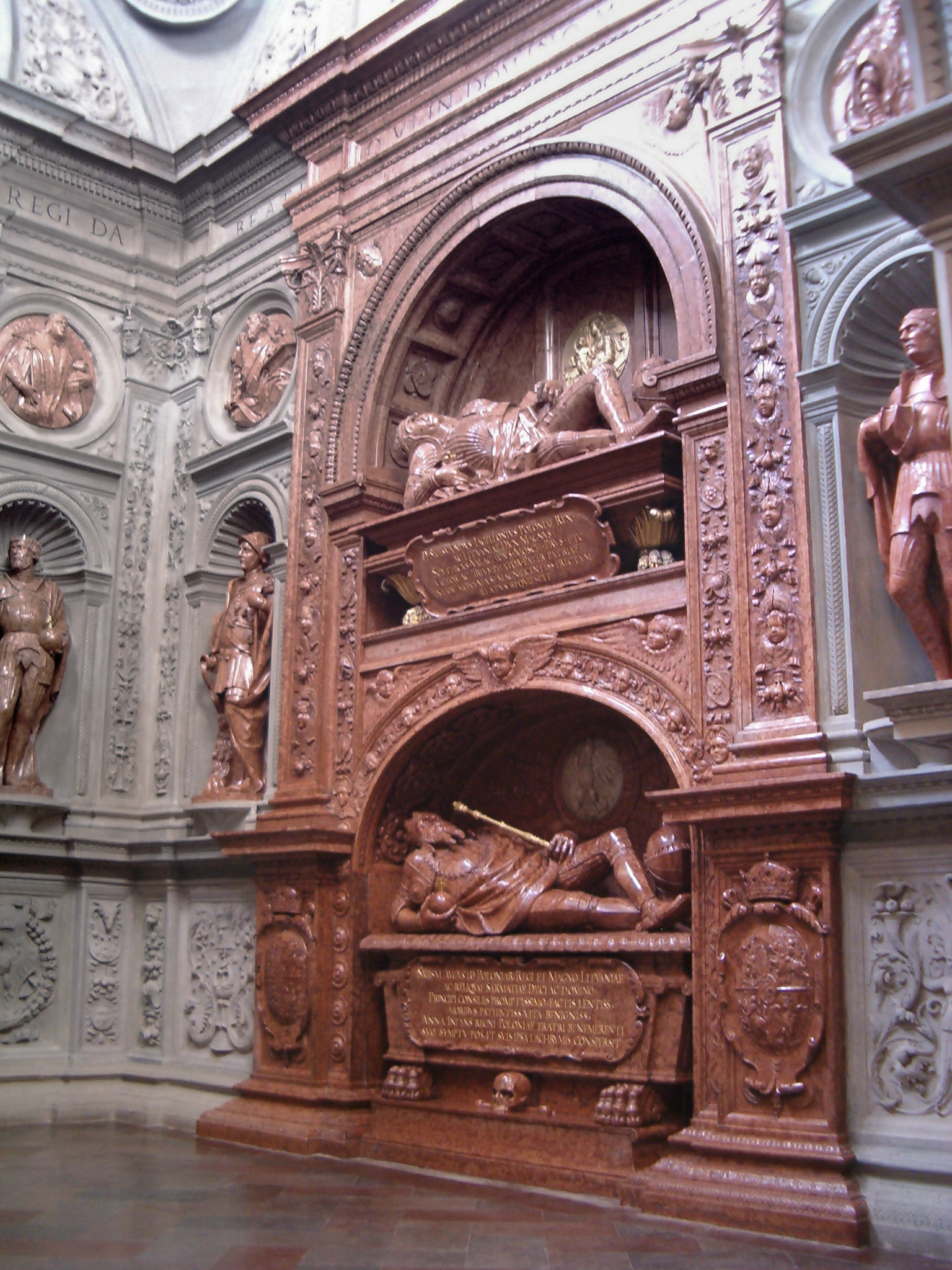
Sigismund's Chapel: Tomb of the chapel's founder, Sigismund I the Old, and his son, Sigismund II Augustus.

In 1517, the 16-year-long construction of another chapel adjoining the cathedral began. Sigismund's Chapel (Kaplica Zygmuntowska) was to serve as the mausoleum of the last members of the Jagiellonian dynasty. Later, at the turn of the 16th century, a memorial tablet to John I Albert was placed in a niche sculptured by Francesco Fiorentino; this is considered to be the first Renaissance work of art in Poland. Other memorials from this period include those of Cardinal Frederic Jagiellon and of bishops Piotr Gamrat, Piotr Tomicki, Jan Konarski, Jan Chojeński and Samuel Maciejowski.

The chapel is considered one of the most notable examples of architecture in Kraków, it has been hailed by many art historians as "the most beautiful example of Tuscan renaissance north of the Alps". Financed by King Sigismund, the chapel was designed by Bartolomeo Berrecci. It is square-based with a golden dome and houses the tombs of its founder as well as King Sigismund II Augustus of Poland and Queen Anna. The design of the internal sculptures, stuccoes and paintings was carried out by some of the most renowned artists of the era, including Santi Gucci, Hermann Vischer, and the architect himself, Georg Pencz.

=== Sigismund Bell ===
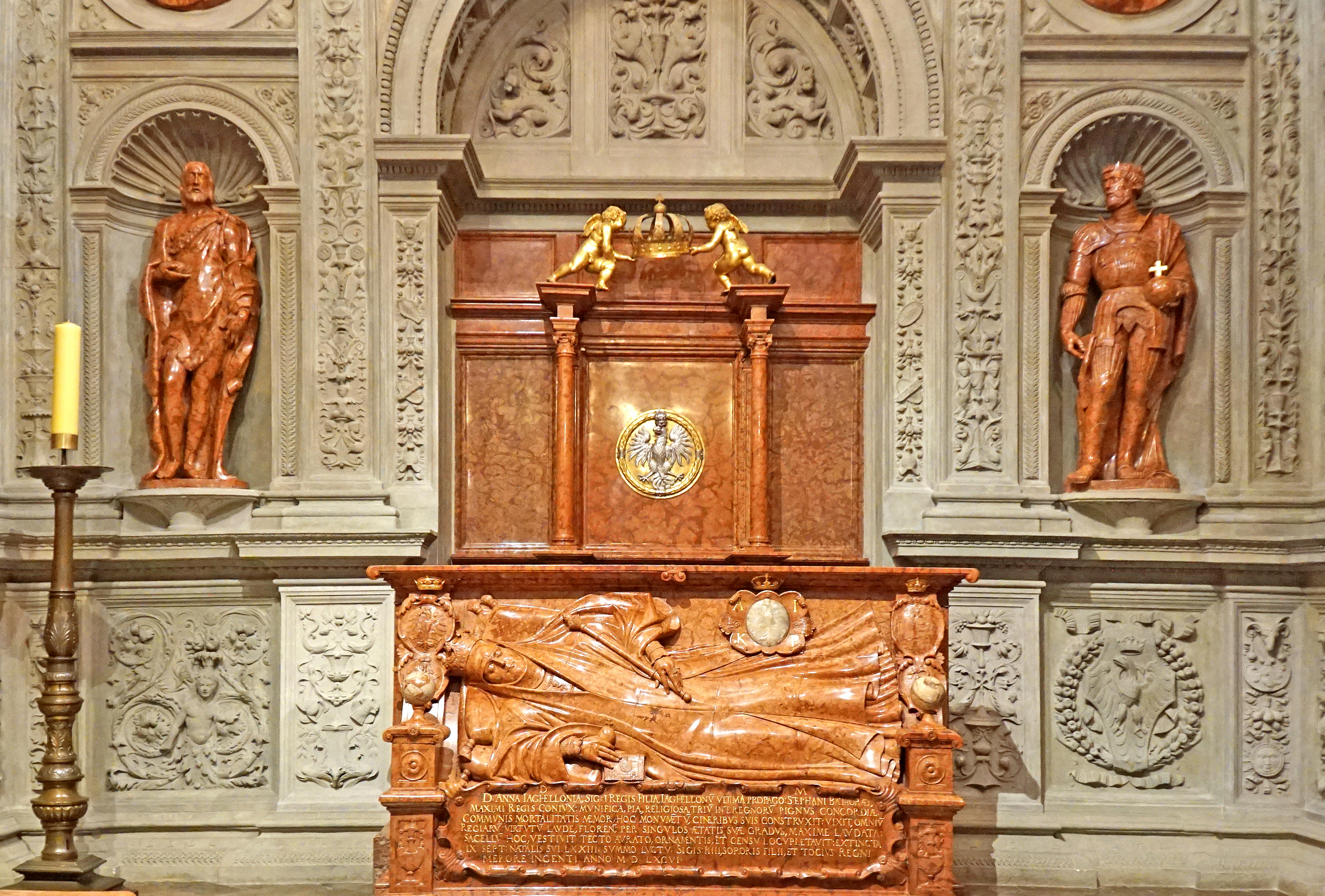
Anna Jagiellon's sarcophagus and tomb in the chapel.

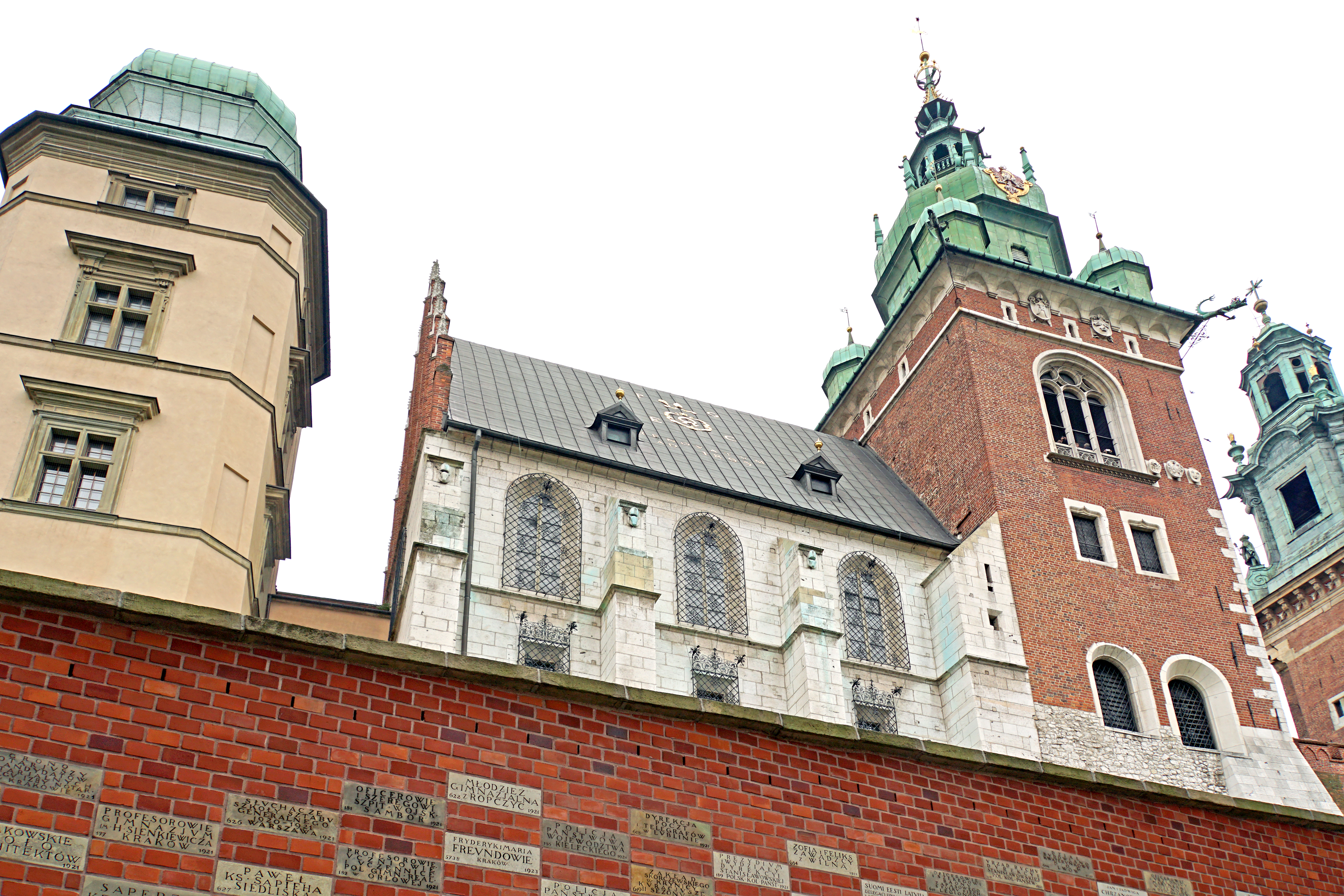
Crown Treasury (center) and Sigismund Tower (right) where the Sigismund Bell hangs since 1521.

In 1520 the Royal Sigismund Bell was cast, by Hans Behem, in bronze; it is the largest of the five bells hanging in the Sigismund Tower and was named to honour King Sigismund I the Old. It weighs almost 13 tonnes (28 thousand pounds) and requires 12 bell-ringers to toll it. It's rung only on special occasions (in modern times these were such events as the death of Józef Pilsudski, the death of Bolesław Bierut, the election of Karol Wojtyla as Pope, Poland's accession to the EU), mostly religious and national holidays, and is regarded as one of the country's national symbols. Today, the bishops of Kraków use it quite often, which reduces the importance of the Sigismund bell. The hanging of the bell is the subject of a painting by Jan Matejko.

== 18th and 19th centuries ==
The 18th and 19th centuries were to be a period of decline and misfortune for Wawel. The decline had begun as early as 1609, when King Sigismund III moved permanently to Warsaw. Despite the concerns of successive governors, both the castle and its precincts began to fall into ruin, which was in part due to occupying Swedes between 1655 and 1657 and again in 1702.

The decline worsened drastically when the hill was occupied by the Prussian army in 1794; at this time, the royal insignia were looted (apart from the Polish coronation sword) and taken to Berlin, where they were melted down for their gold, precious gemstones and pearls, which were handed to the Directorate of Maritime Trade in Berlin.

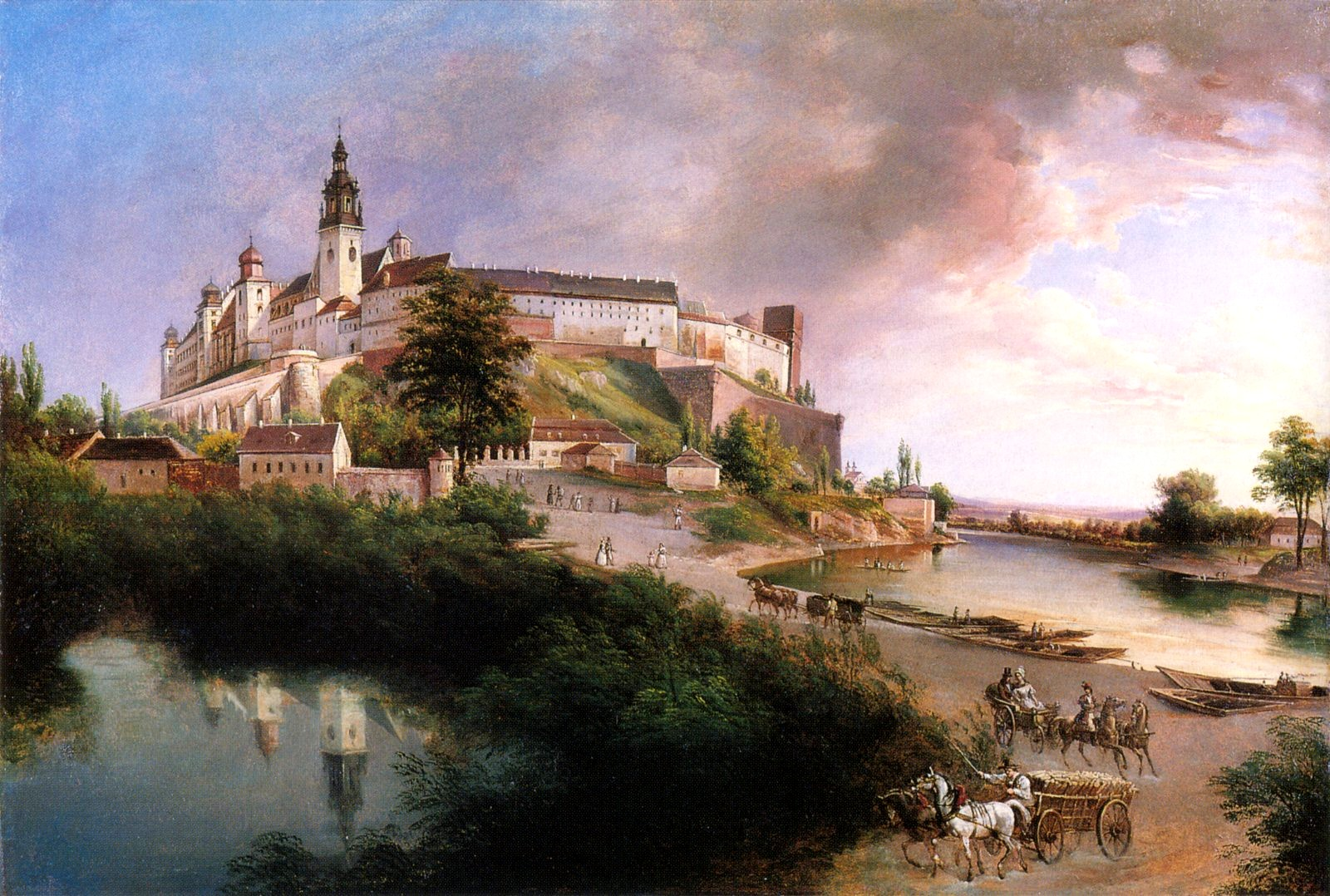
Wawel Hill, an 1847 oil painting by Jan Nepomucen Głowacki, the most outstanding landscape painter of Polish Romanticism under the foreign partitions.

The castle was besieged and then taken by the Russians on 26 April 1772, during the war of the Bar Confederation. After the Third Partition of Poland (1795), Wawel fell under Austrian rule. Austrian soldiers converted the hill into barracks and as a consequence, much destruction and alteration took place: the Renaissance arcades of the courtyard were walled up, the interior of the castle was changed and parts of the buildings were demolished; amongst the buildings destroyed were the churches of St. Michael and St. George.

Following the unsuccessful Kraków Uprising and the fall of the Republic of Kraków, three large buildings housing a military hospital were built on the hill. During the latter half of the 19th century, the Austrians rebuilt the defence walls, making them a part of the expanded Kraków fortification system (two new caponiers were made). At the same time, the Poles tried to retake the hill.

In 1815, the funeral of Prince Józef Poniatowski took place at Wawel Cathedral. Since that event, national heroes have been entombed within the cathedral; prior to this date, only bodies of monarchs were interred there. In 1818, the body of national hero Tadeusz Kościuszko was buried in St. Leonard's Crypt. During the reconstruction of Potocki Chapel in a classical style, the statue of Prince Arthur Potocki by the Danish sculptor Bertel Thorvaldsen was placed within the chapel. A second work by Thorvaldsen was placed in Queen Sophia's Chapel.

In 1869, due to the accidental opening of the coffin of King Casimir III, a second funeral was performed. Consequently, an initiative was taken to renovate other monarchs' tombs in the cathedral. The underground crypts were connected with tunnels, sarcophagi were cleaned and refurbished and new ones were funded. Emperor Franz Joseph I of Austria paid for a sarcophagus for King Michael, whose wife was from the House of Habsburg.

== 20th and 21st centuries ==
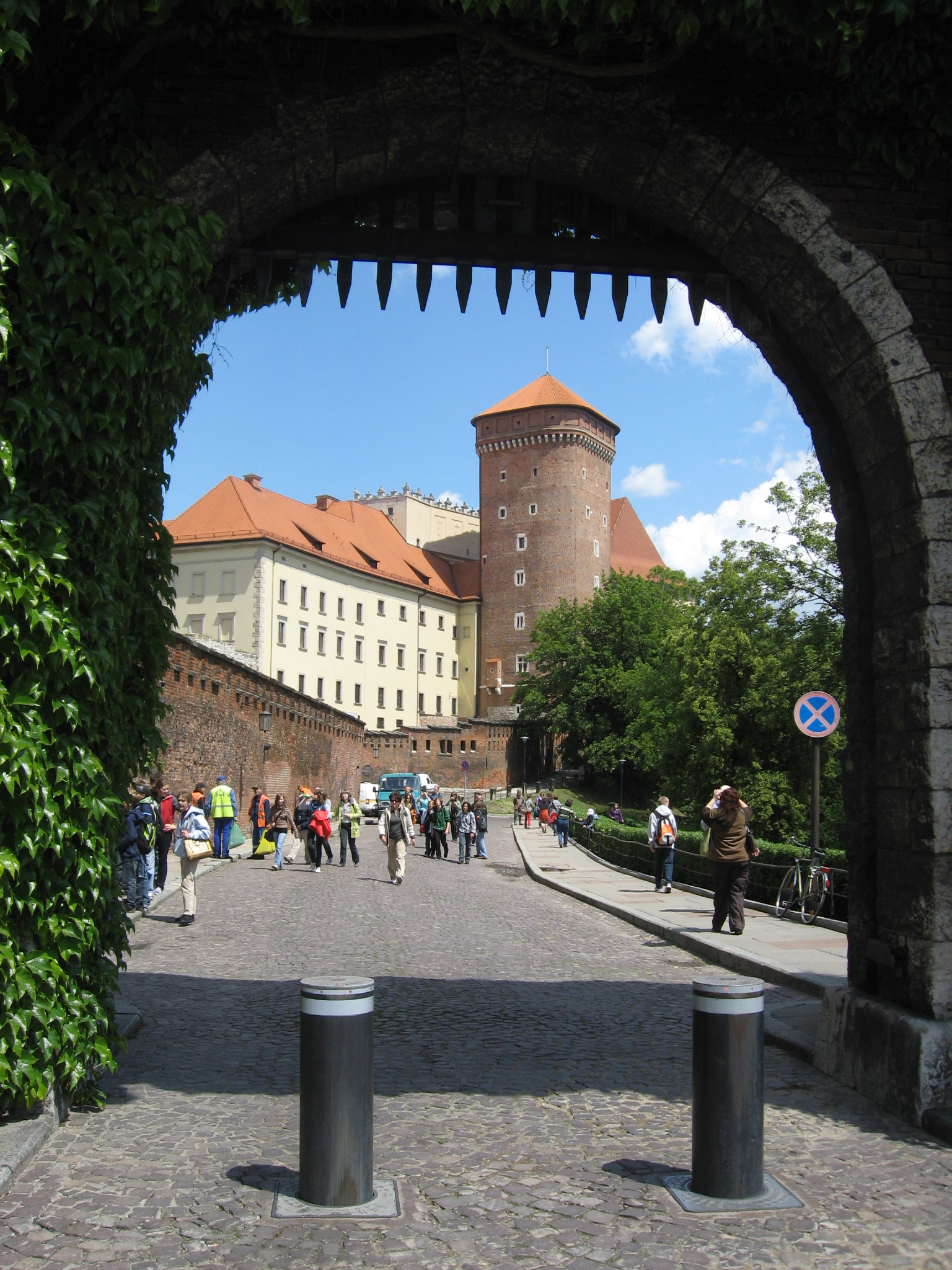
Today, the Wawel is both a place of national pilgrimage and a popular tourist destination.

In 1905, Emperor Franz Joseph I of Austria, in his capacity as King of Galicia and Lodomeria, ordered his troops to leave Wawel. The Austrian withdrawal permitted the commencement of restoration work managed by Zygmunt Hendel and Adolf Szyszko-Bohusz. During the renovation, the Rotunda of Virgin Mary was discovered as well as other notable relics of the past. The renovation of the Wawel Hill was funded by public subscription. The names of the donors were inscribed on the bricks used to build the wall near the castle's northern gateway. The Coat of Arms Gate was built at this time and the statue of Tadeusz Kościuszko was placed nearby.

Between 1902 and 1904, Włodzimierz Tetmajer decorated the walls of Queen Sophia's Chapel with paintings depicting Polish saints and national heroes.

Józef Mehoffer painted murals in the vault of the cathedral and created stained-glass windows in the St. Cross Chapel as well as paintings in the Szafrańcy Chapel. Mehoffer is also responsible for the stained-glass windows in the transept which depict the Sufferings of Christ and the Virgin Mary.

During Poland's twenty years of independence after World War I, Polish authorities decided that the Wawel Castle was to be a representative building of the Polish Republic and would be used an official residence by the State Governor; this position was further reinforced when, in 1921, the Polish Parliament passed a resolution which gave Wawel official status as the residence of the President of Poland. No legal acts have been issued by the independent Polish authorities redacting this resolution (apart from the decision of the Stalinist State National Council (KRN) to change the Wawel Castle into a museum).

In 1921 a statue of Tadeusz Kościuszko sculpted by Leandro Marconi and Antoni Popiel was placed on the ramparts of king Władysław IV Vasa on the northside.

In 1925, a column fragment of Wawel Castle was incorporated into Chicago's landmark Tribune Tower. Located in its own niche over the upper-left corner of the main entrance; it is a visual tribute to Chicago's large Polish populace, the largest such presence outside of the Republic of Poland.

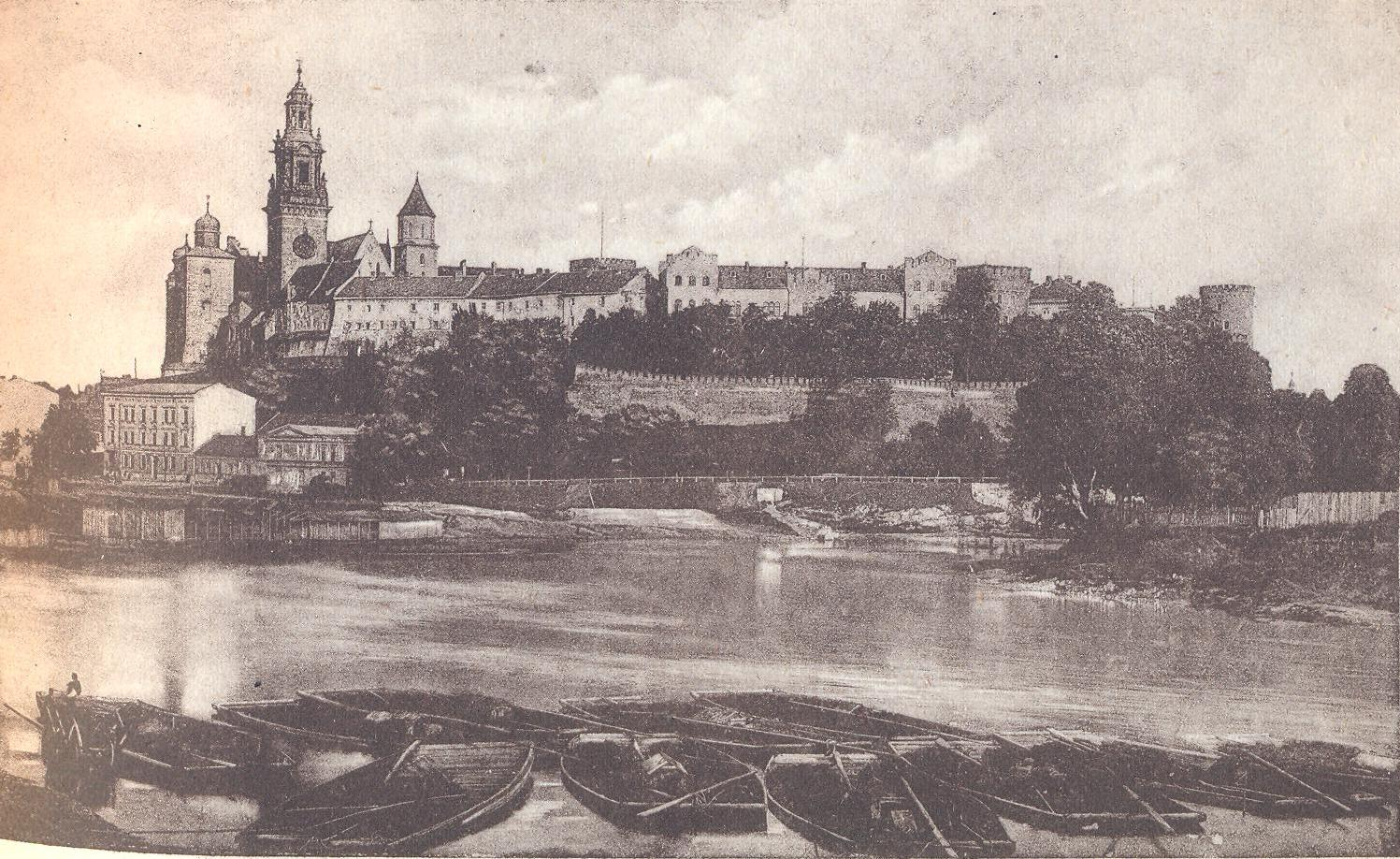
A view of the cathedral from the Vistula river in the 1930s

The tradition of burying notable Polish national in the cathedral has continued into the 21st century: in 1927, the ashes of the romantic poet Juliusz Słowacki were brought to the cathedral, ten years later the statesman and former Leader of Second Polish Republic, Marshal Józef Piłsudski, was interred in a vault beneath the Silver Tower and in 1993 the remains of the World War II military leader Władysław Sikorski were finally returned to Poland for burial in the crypt. More recently, the bodies of President Lech Kaczyński and his wife were entombed in a sarcophagus in 2010, in the antechamber of the vault beneath the Silver Bell Tower.

During World War II, when Poland was occupied by Nazi Germany, the Wawel Castle was the residence of governor general Hans Frank, later to be executed as a war criminal. During his despotic regime, Raphael's Portrait of a Young Man (1513–14), part of the Czartoryski collection, was removed from Wawel and to this day has yet to be returned to Poland. Many of the tapestries have also disappeared, their whereabouts unknown; however 150 tapestries, which along with many of the Wawel's other treasures had spent the war years in Canada for safekeeping, have been returned to the castle and are part of the Wawel Royal Castle National Art Collection on public display along with countless art treasures and items of historical Polish significance.

In 1945, the National Council abolished the building's function as the residence of the head of state and turned it over entirely to exhibition purposes. Part of the ground floor rooms in the north wing were also designated as the State Archives of the City of Kraków. In the last decade of the 20th century, the castle underwent a thorough renovation, and the institution's name was changed to Wawel Royal Castle National Art Collection.

=== John Paul II Wawel Cathedral Museum ===
The 14th-century former Cathedral house, in the shadow of the Silver Bell Tower, between the Vasa Gate and the former Clerical Seminary, now houses the John Paul II Wawel Cathedral Museum. It was opened in 1978 by Cardinal Karol Wojtyła, Archbishop of Kraków (later Pope John Paul II), and displays many historic Polish artefacts both spiritual and temporal which were formerly kept in the cathedral's treasury.

== Treasury and armoury ==
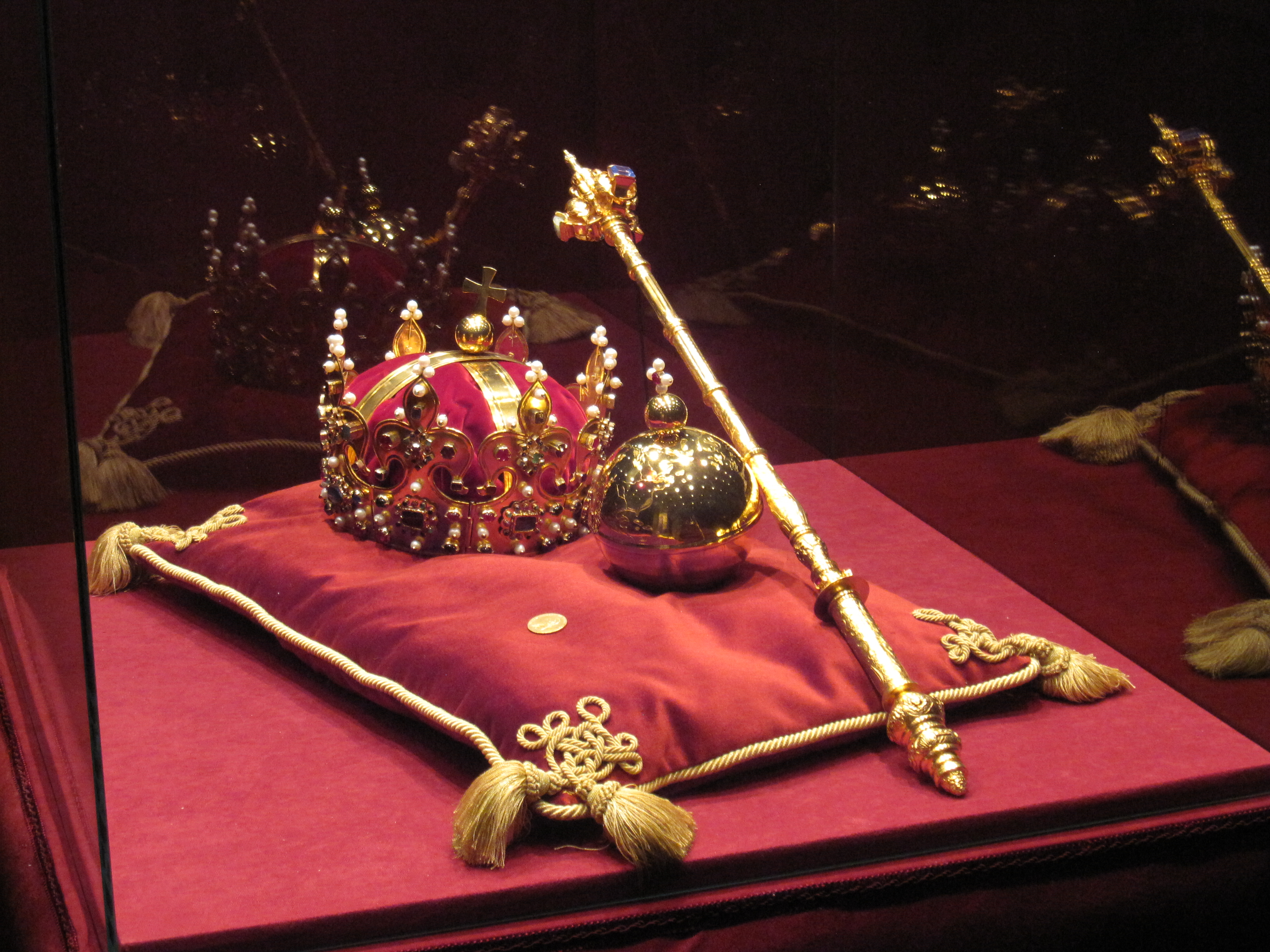
Replicas of the Polish Crown Jewels

The Crown Treasury situated in the historic Gothic rooms which were used from the 15th century on for storing the Polish coronation insignia and Crown Jewels, feature on display priceless objects from the former Treasury that survived plunder, among them the memorabilia of Polish monarchs including members of their families and eminent personages, like the hat and sword given to John III Sobieski by the pope after the Battle of Vienna, as well as the coronation sword Szczerbiec.

In February 2021, a unique set of 16th-century child armour belonging to Polish king Sigismund Augustus was officially returned to Poland by Hungary and is now kept in the collections of the Wawel Castle. Since World War I it had been held in the Museum of Fine Arts in Budapest where it was transported by mistake.

== Chambers ==
- State Rooms
- Royal Private Apartments
- Exhibition "The Lost Wawel"
- Exhibition "Oriental Art"
- The Royal Gardens
- Dragon's Den

== Gallery ==
Wawel Castle Complex

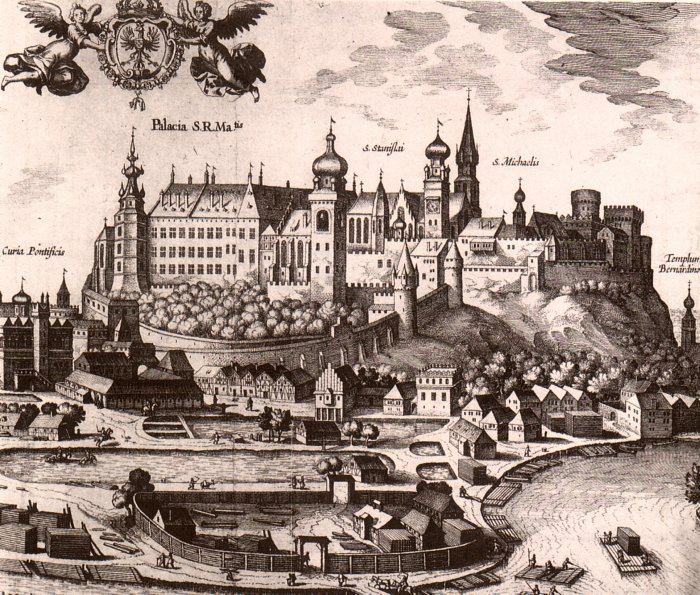
A woodcut of Wawel Castle in 1617

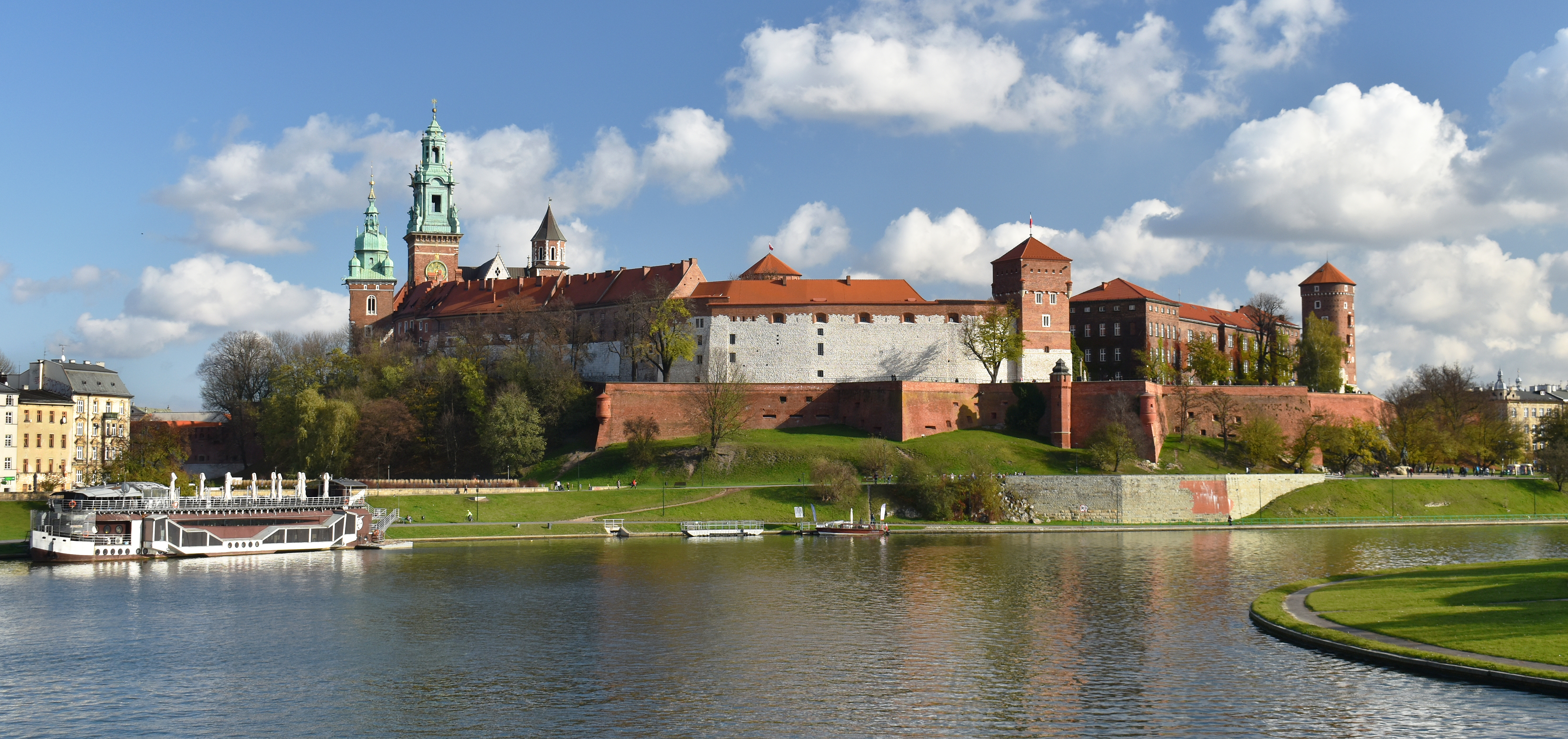
The castle seen from the Dębnicki Bridge

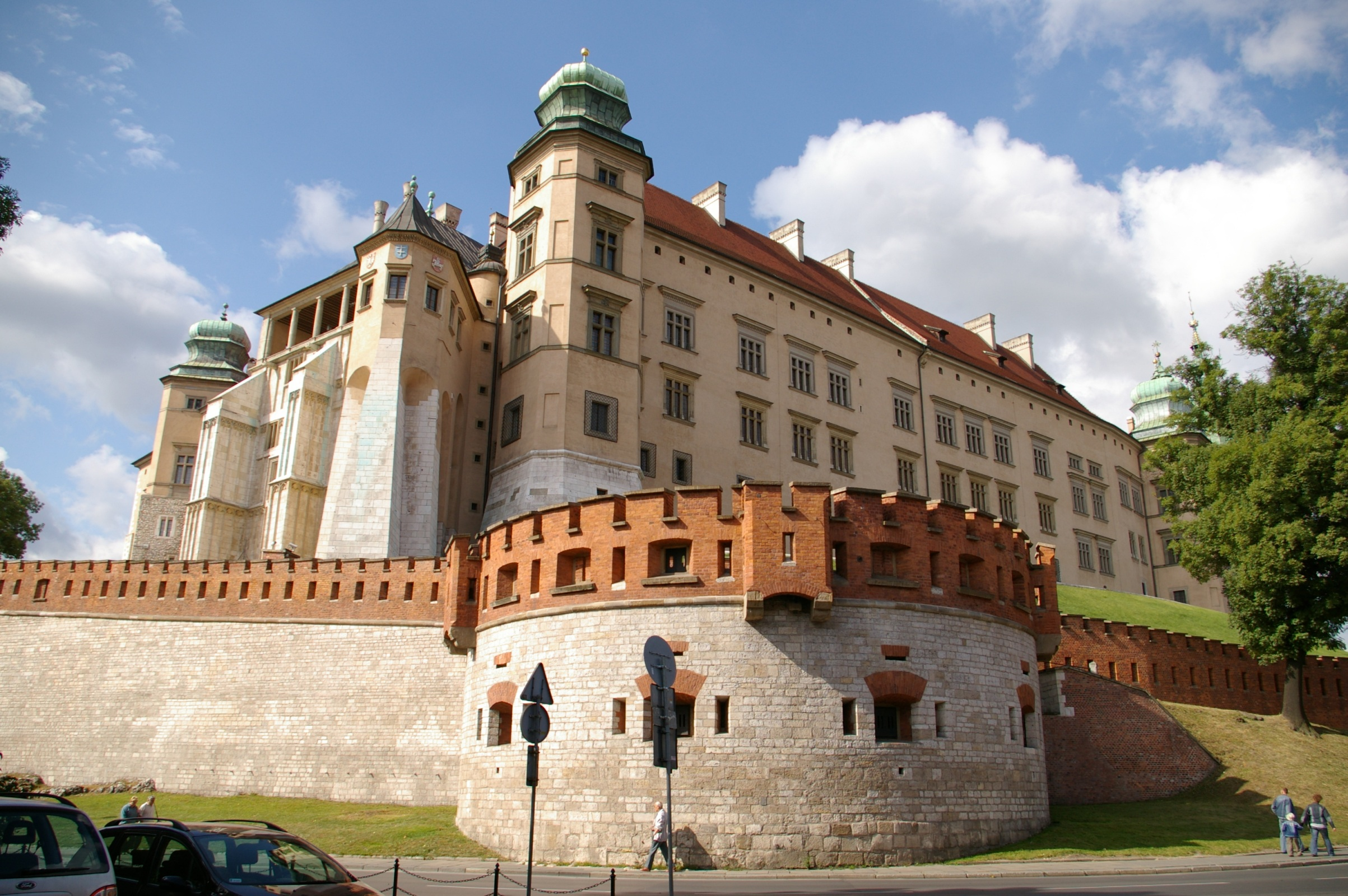
Sigismund III Vasa Tower (1595) and defensive walls

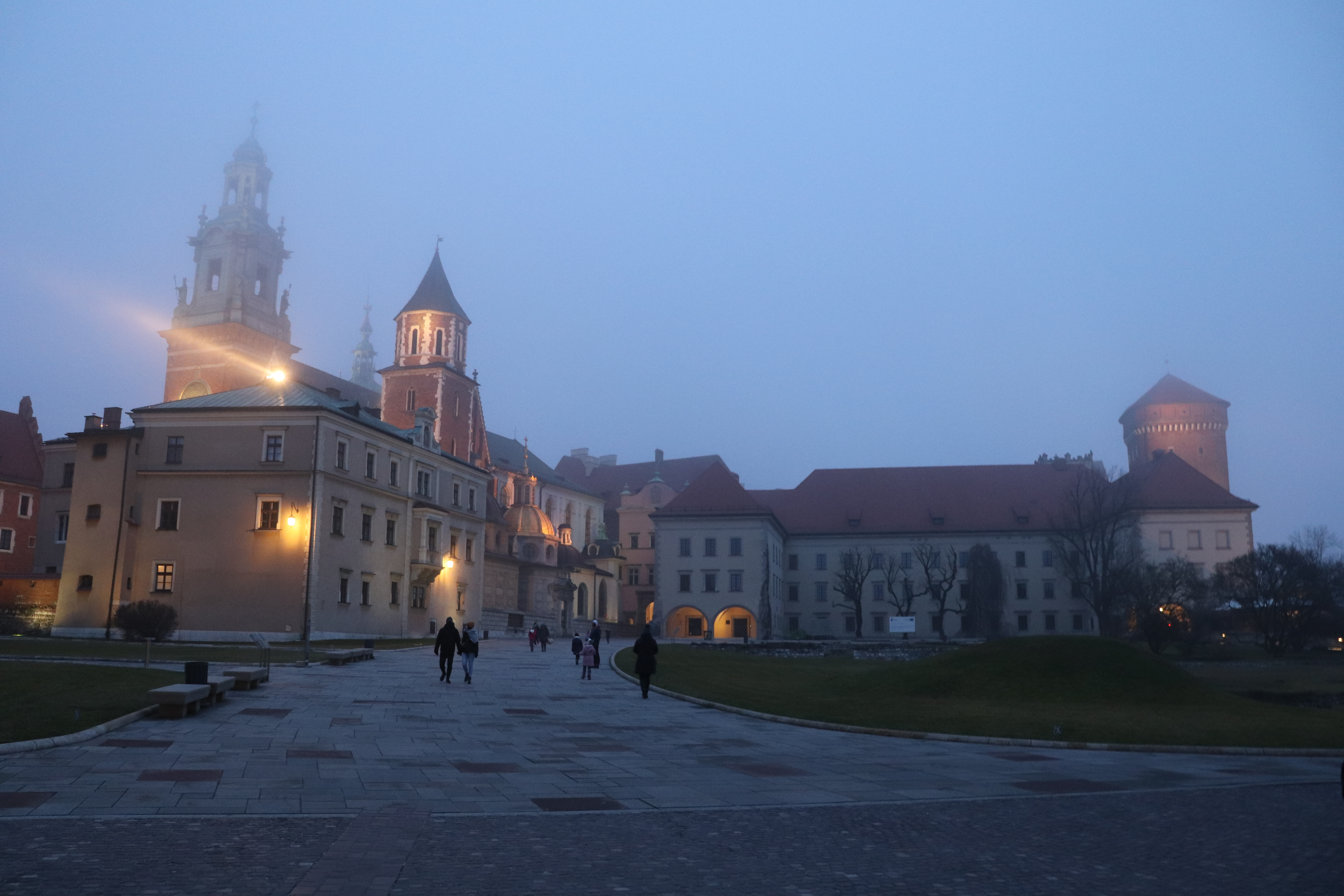
View of Wawel at night

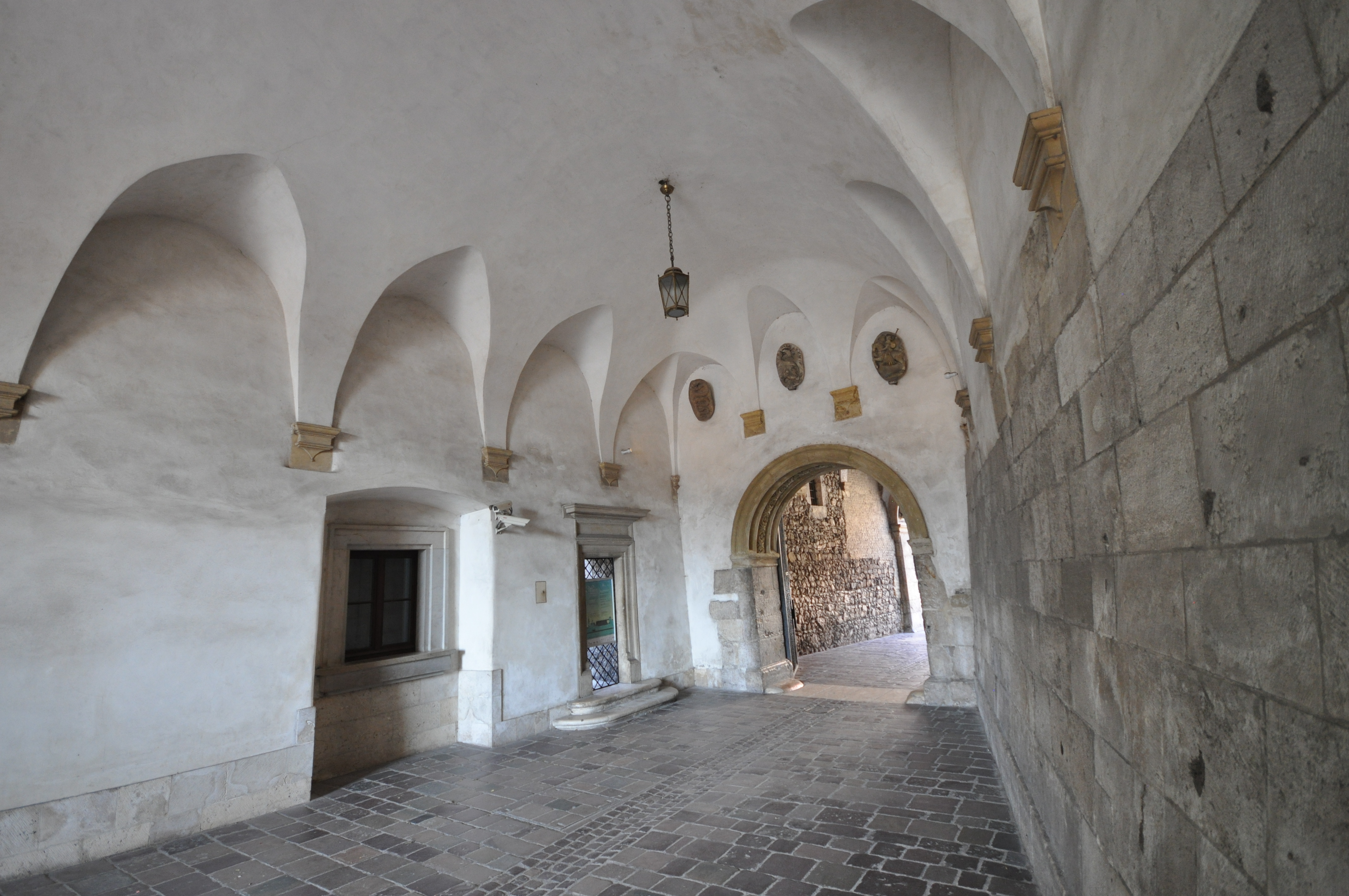
Entrance to the courtyard

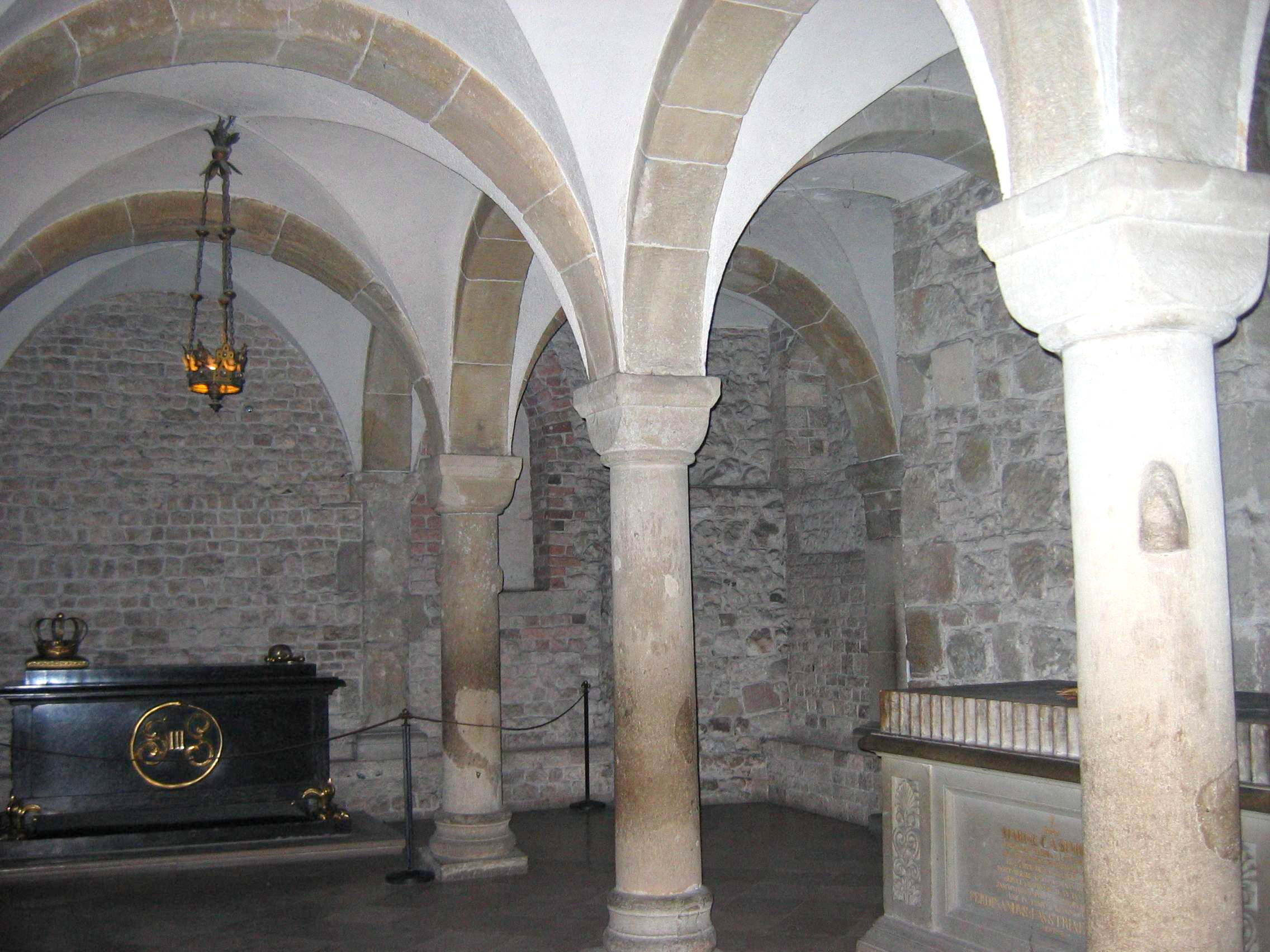
St. Leonard's Crypt under the Wawel Castle

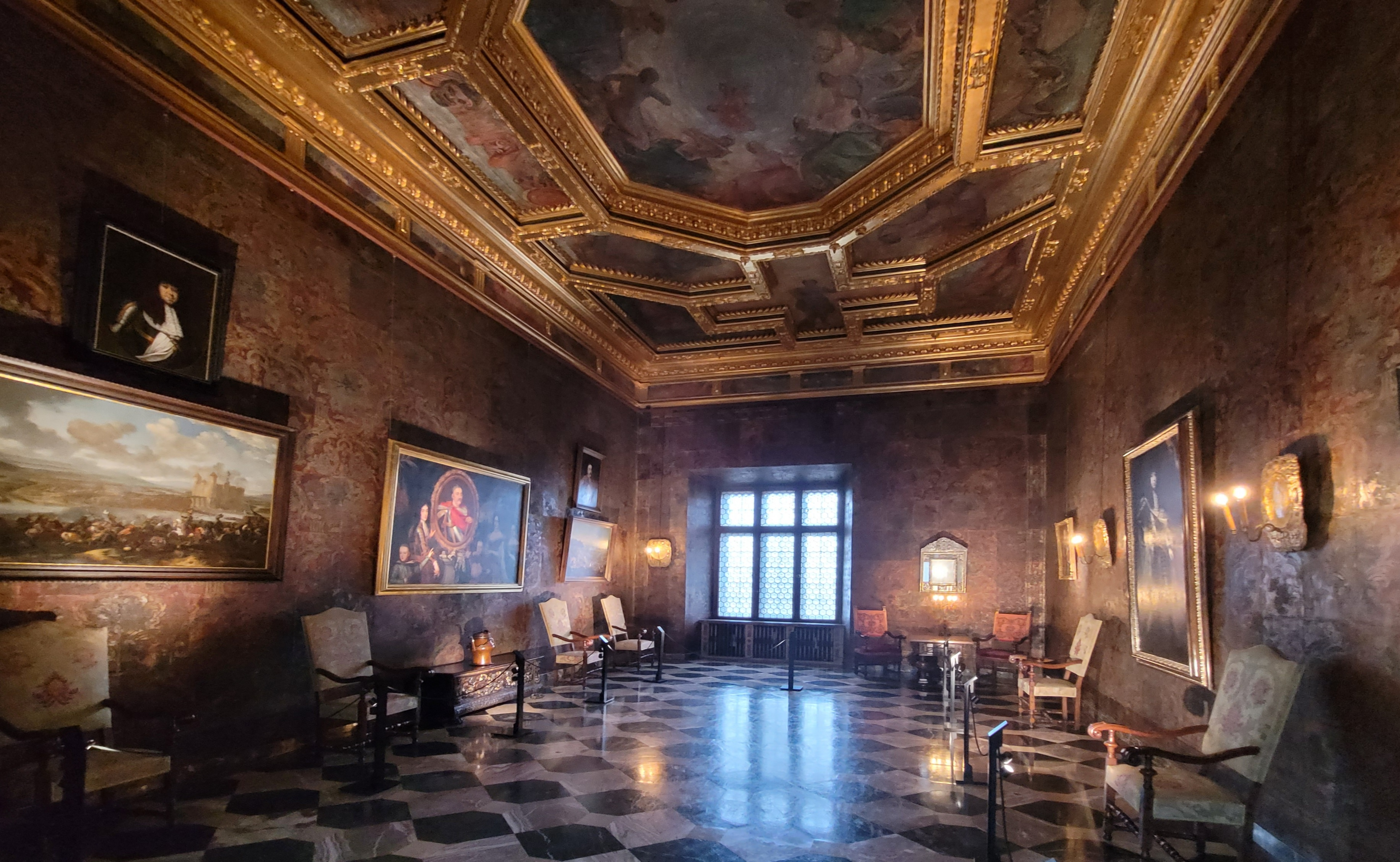
Chamber leading to the Senators' Hall

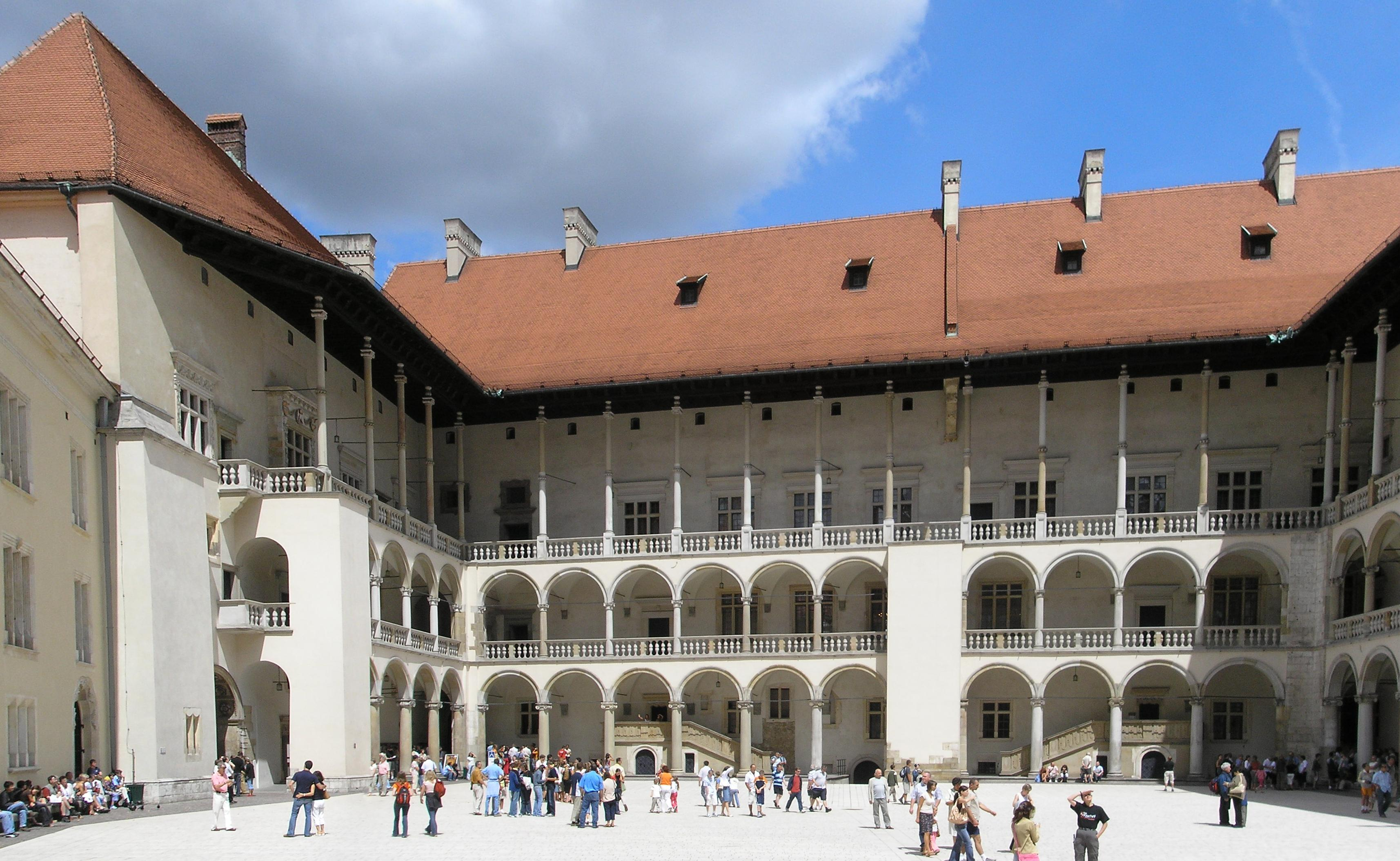
The 16th century Renaissance inner courtyard

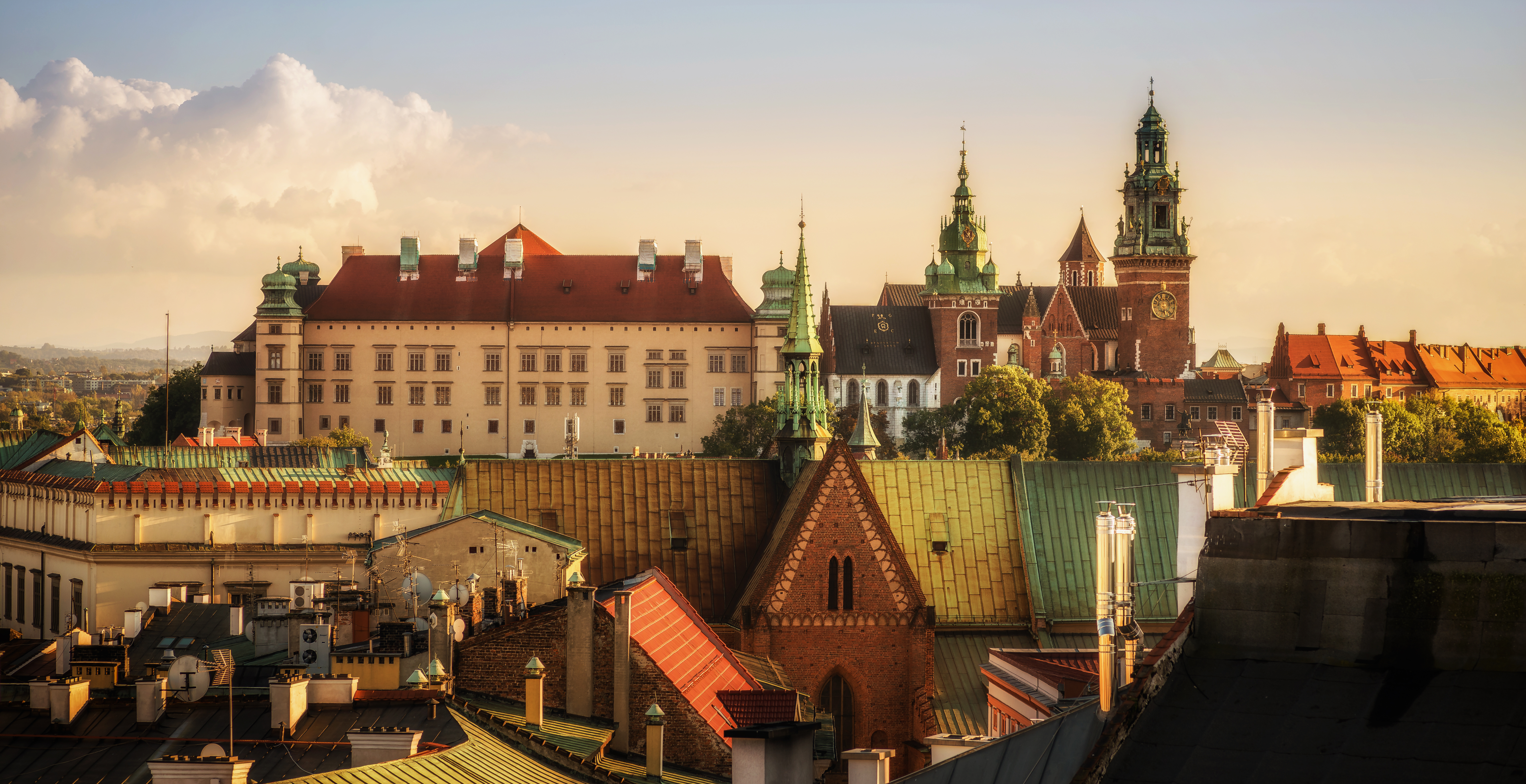
Wawel Royal Castle Complex

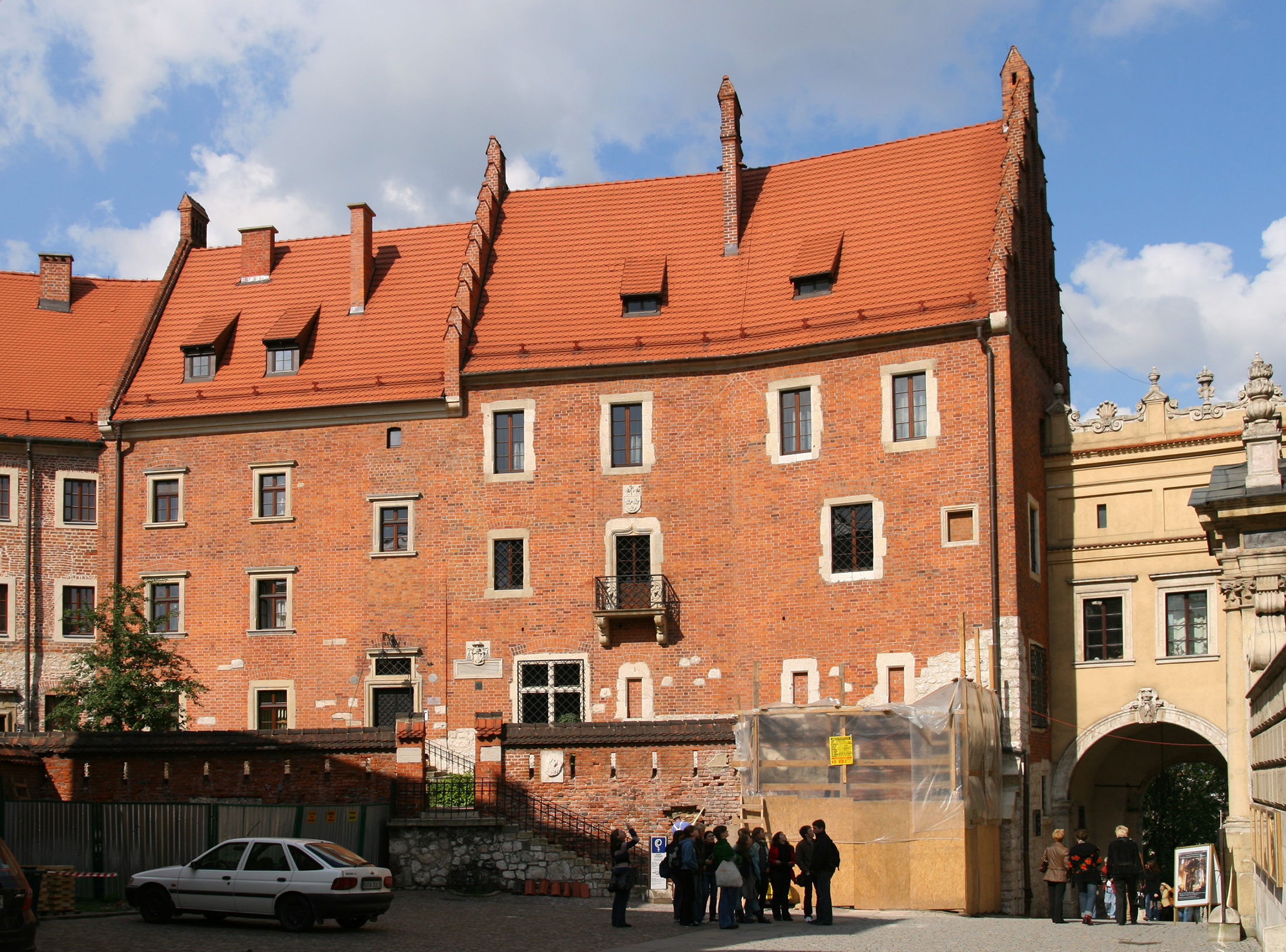
Cathedral Museum

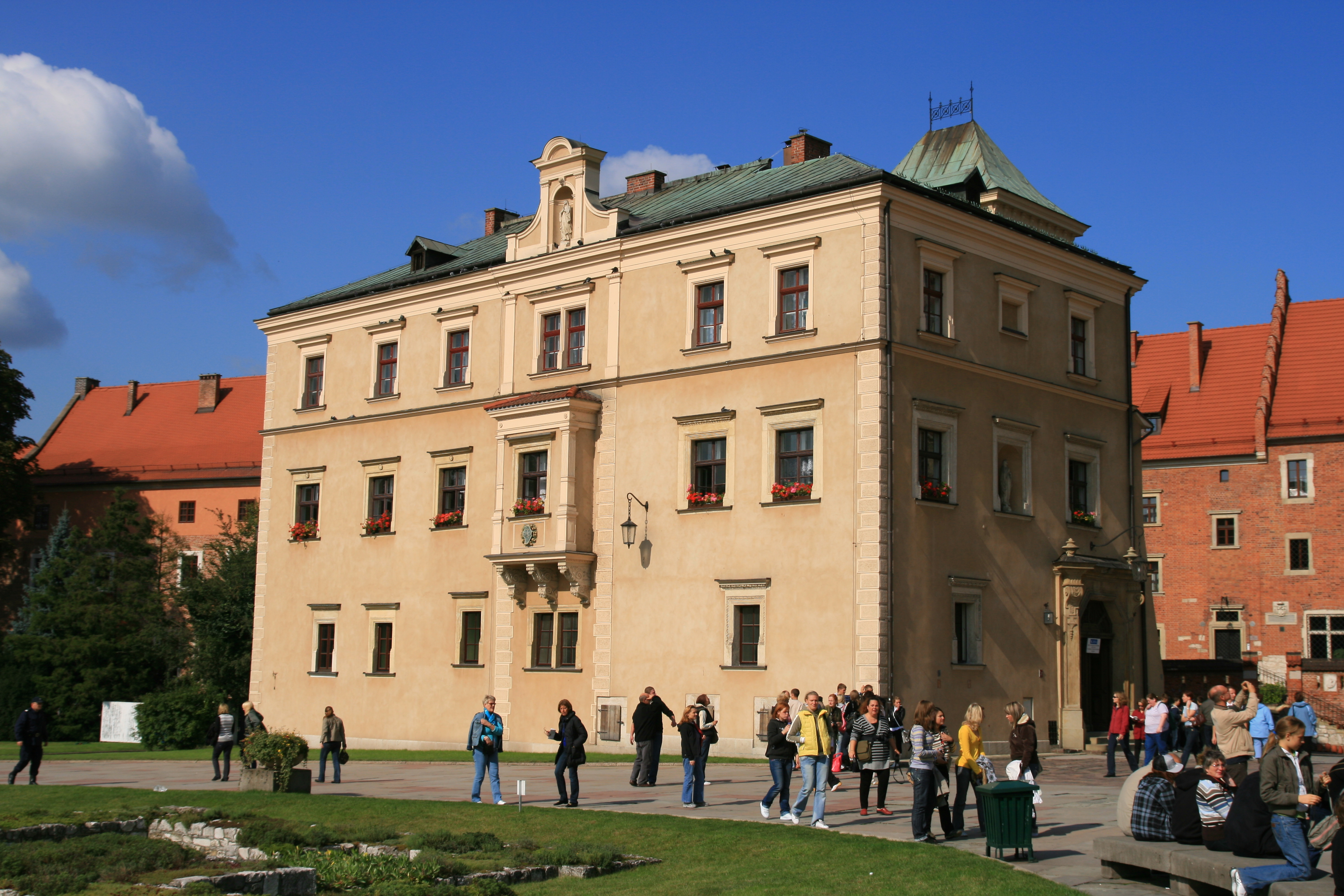
Parish house

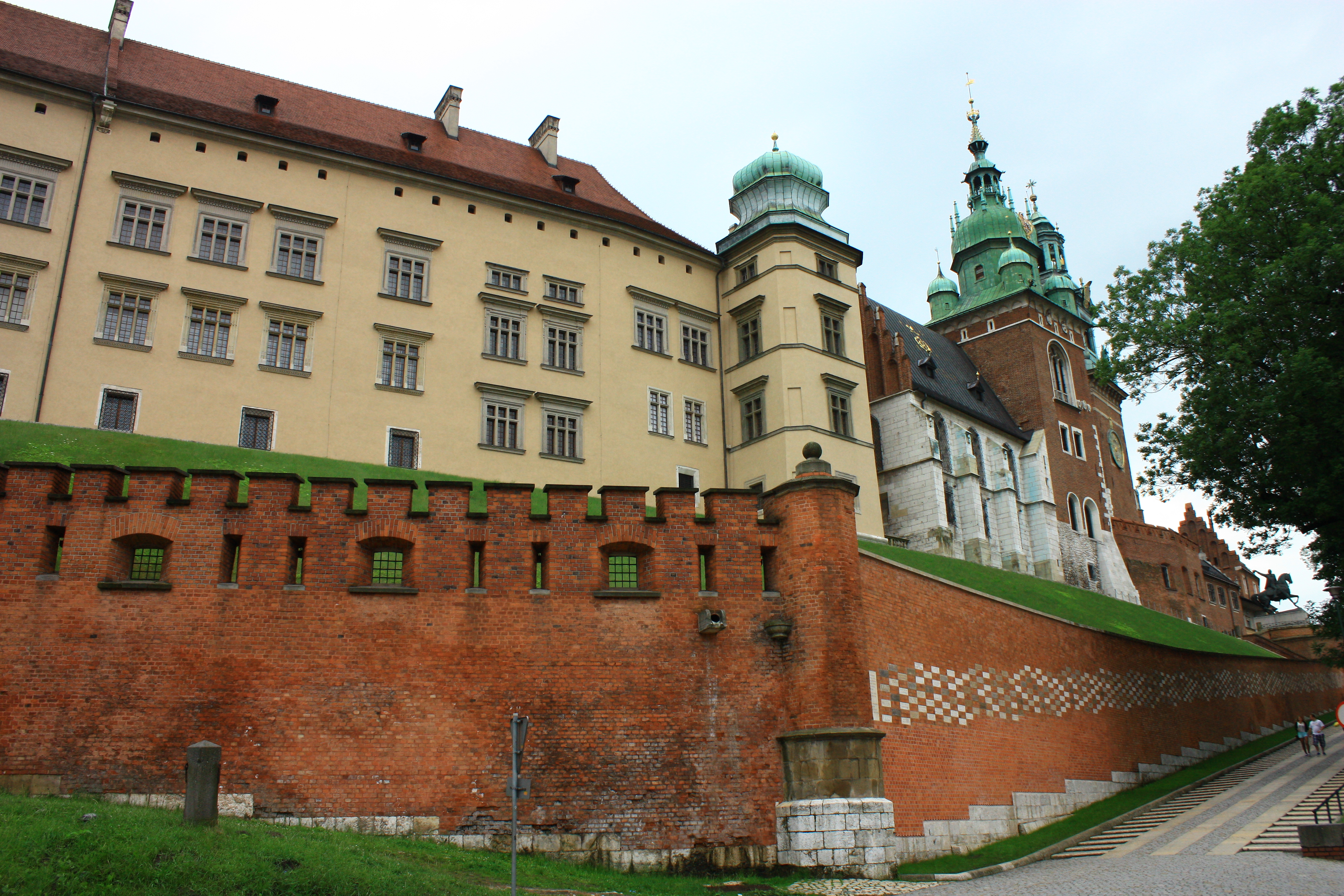
Wawel Royal Castle, view from Grodzka

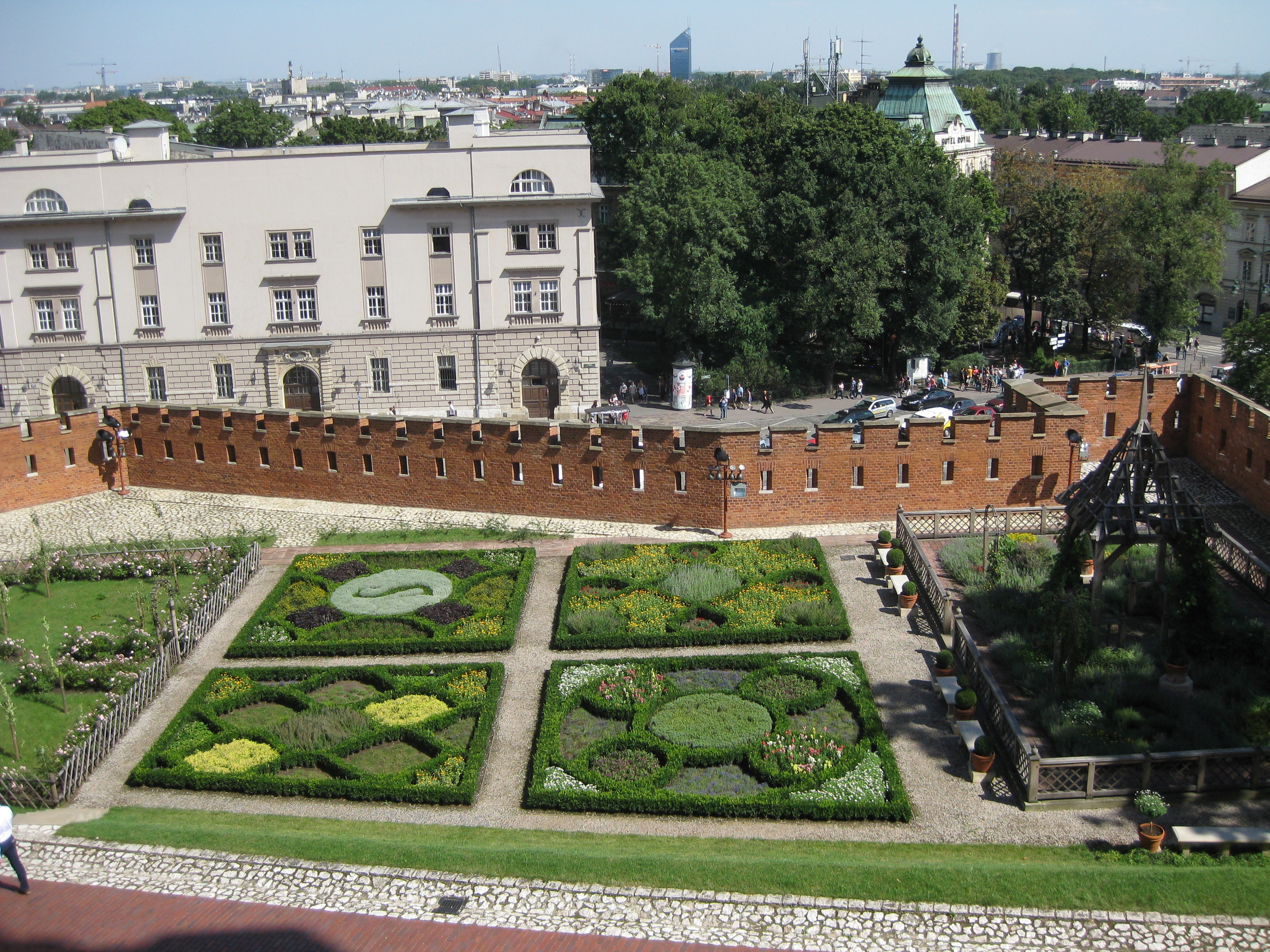
Royal Gardens

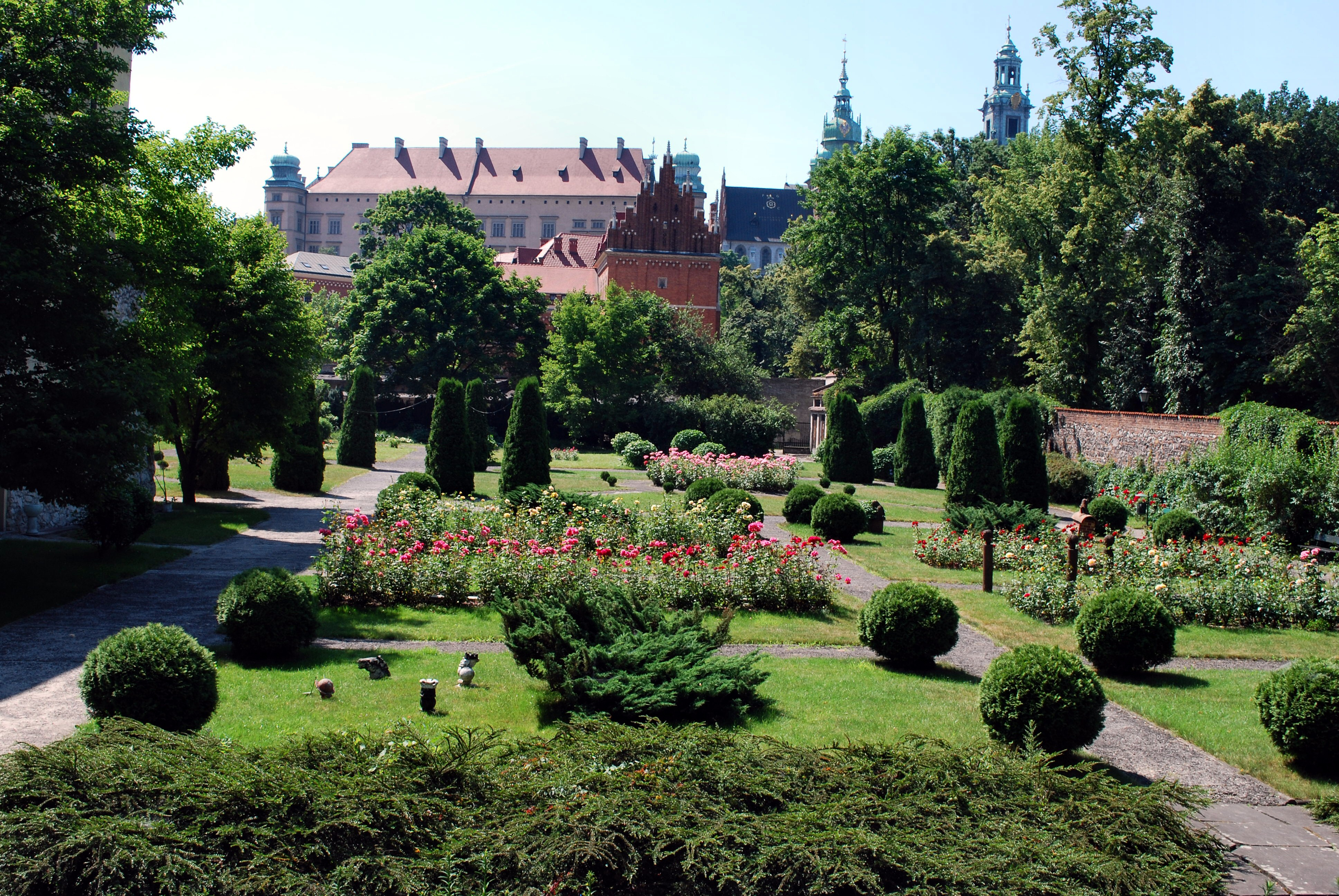
View from the Archaeological Museum Gardens

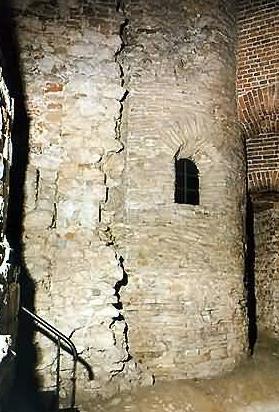
Saint Felix and Adaukt Rotunda, 10/11th century
Artwork

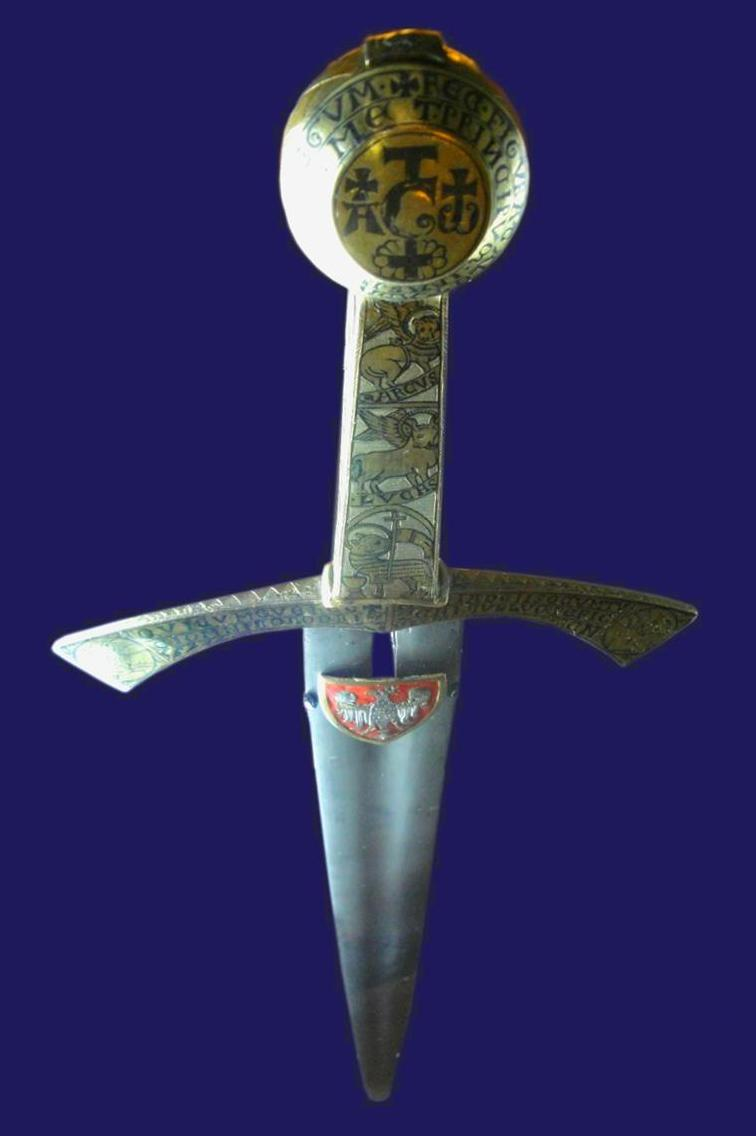
Szczerbiec, the coronation sword of Polish monarchs

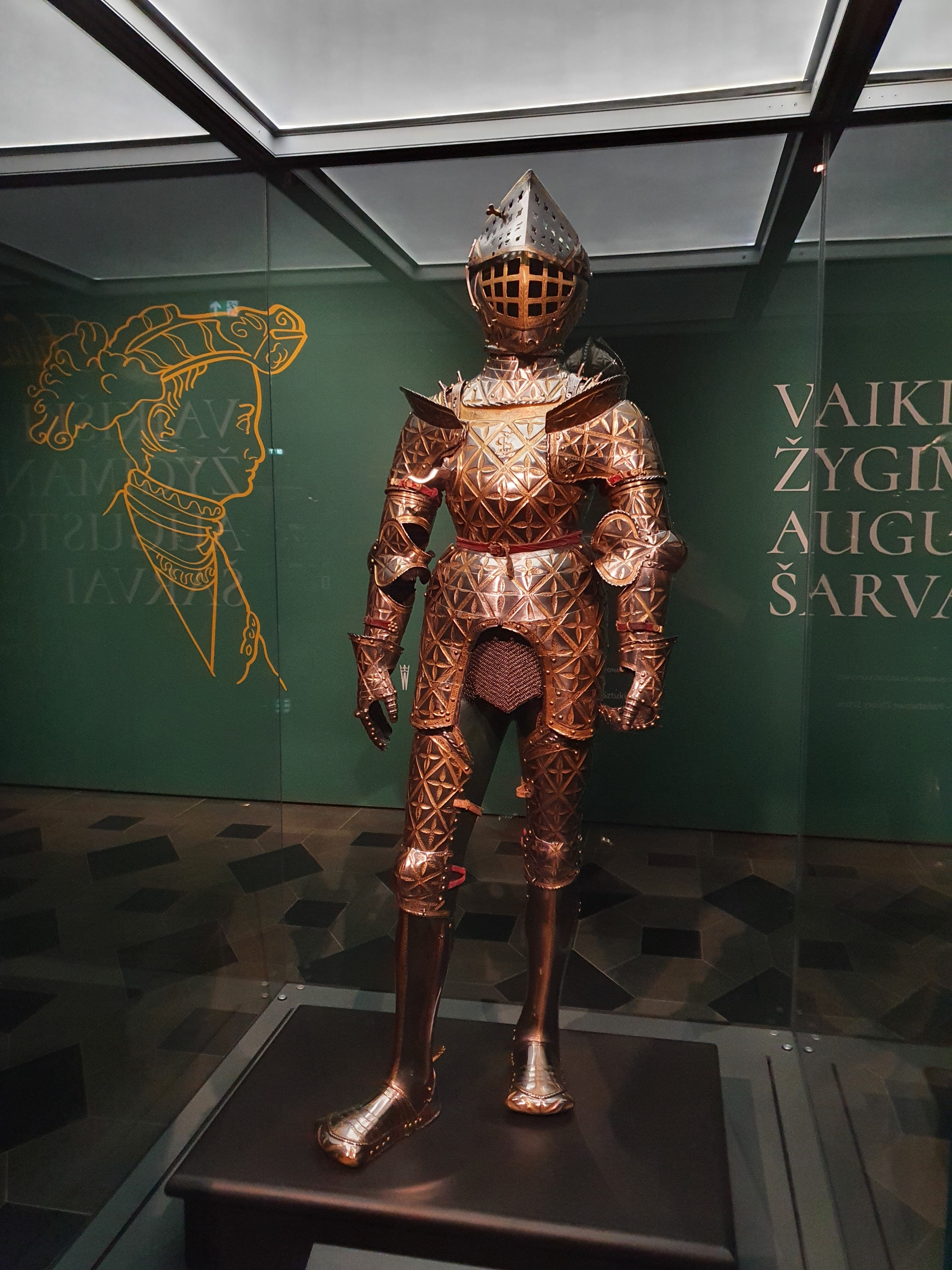
Child armour of Sigismund Augustus, 1533

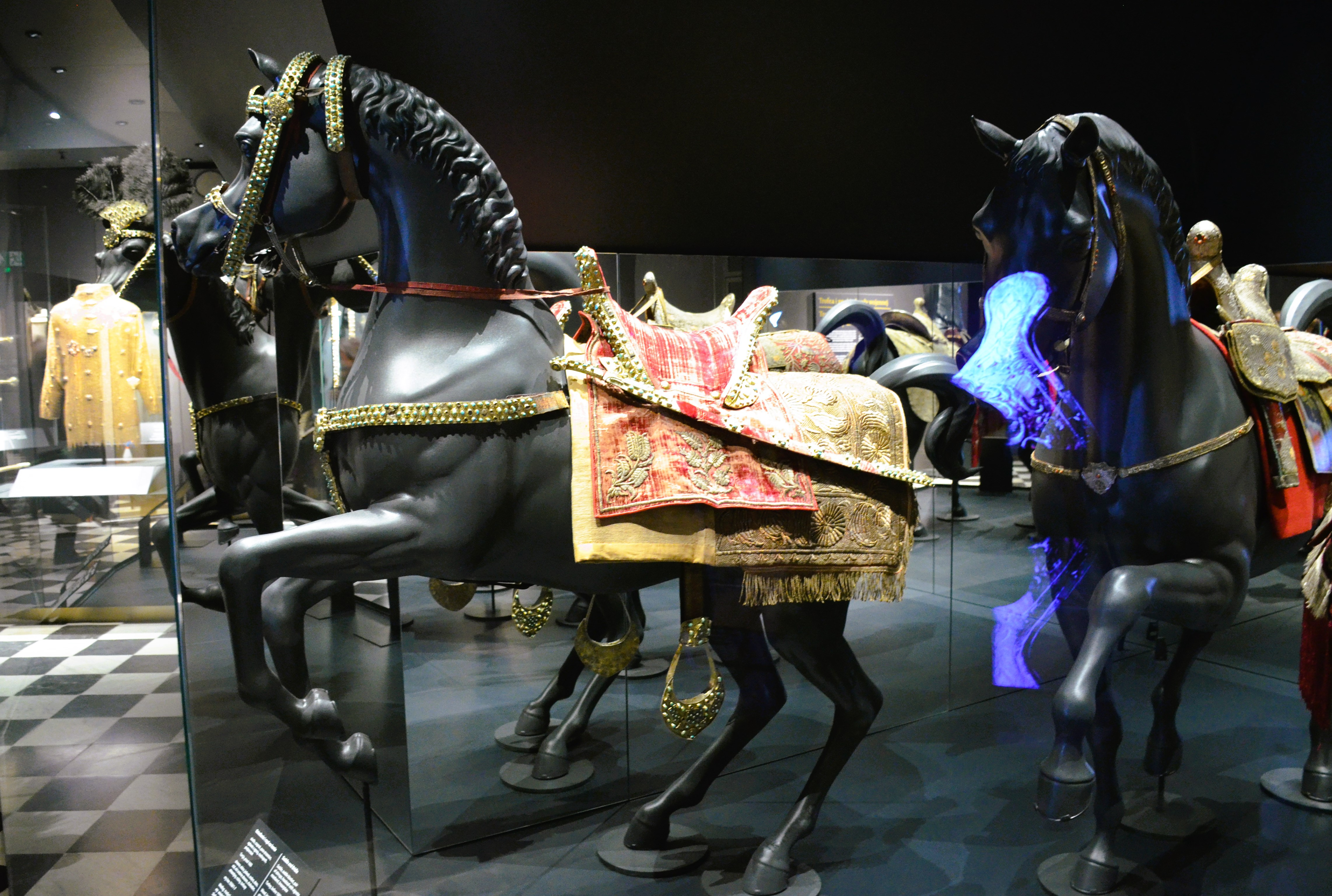
Interior of the Crown Treasury

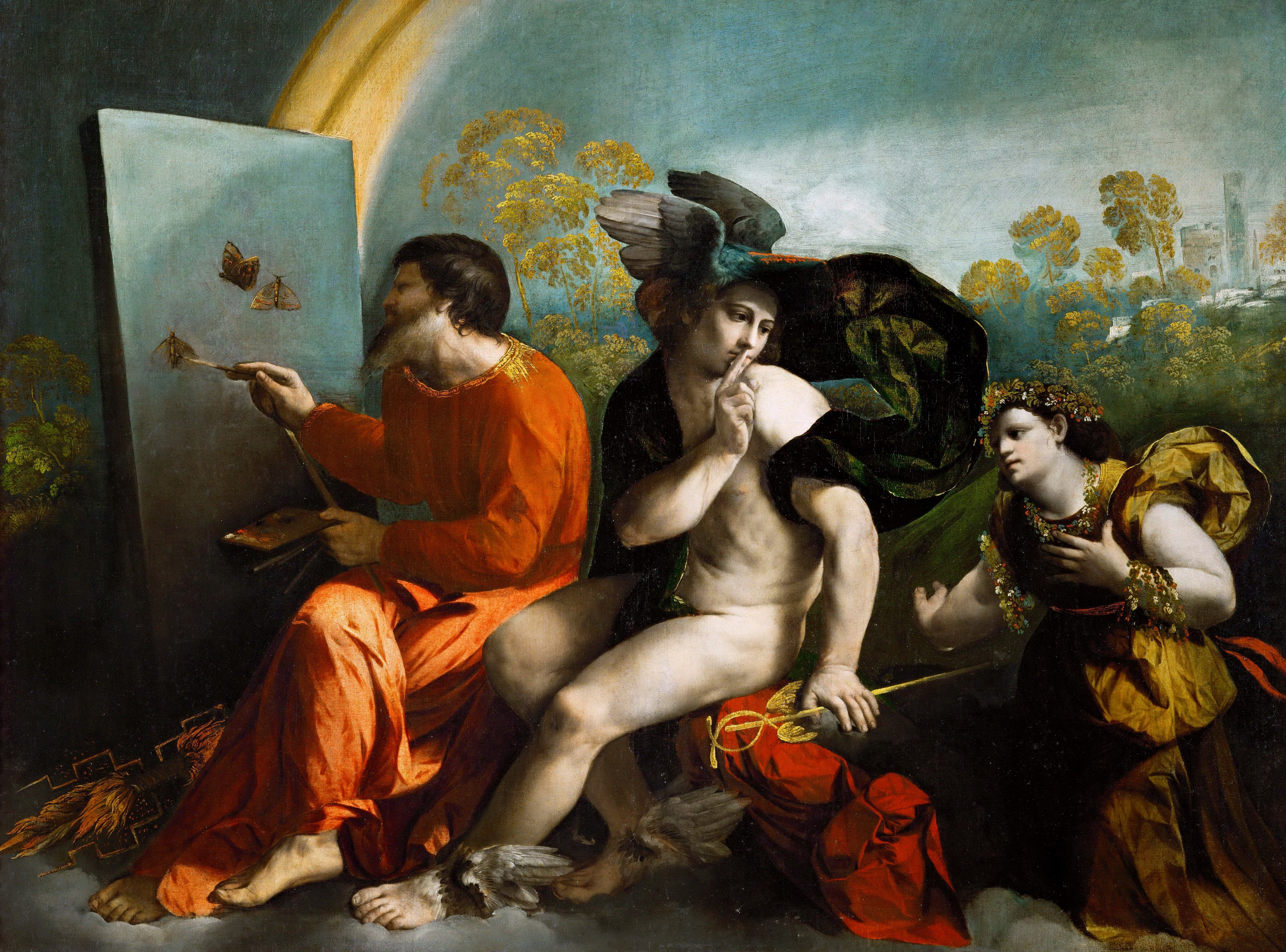
Jupiter, Mercury and Virtue by Dosso Dossi, 1524, is one of the most valuable paintings in the collection.

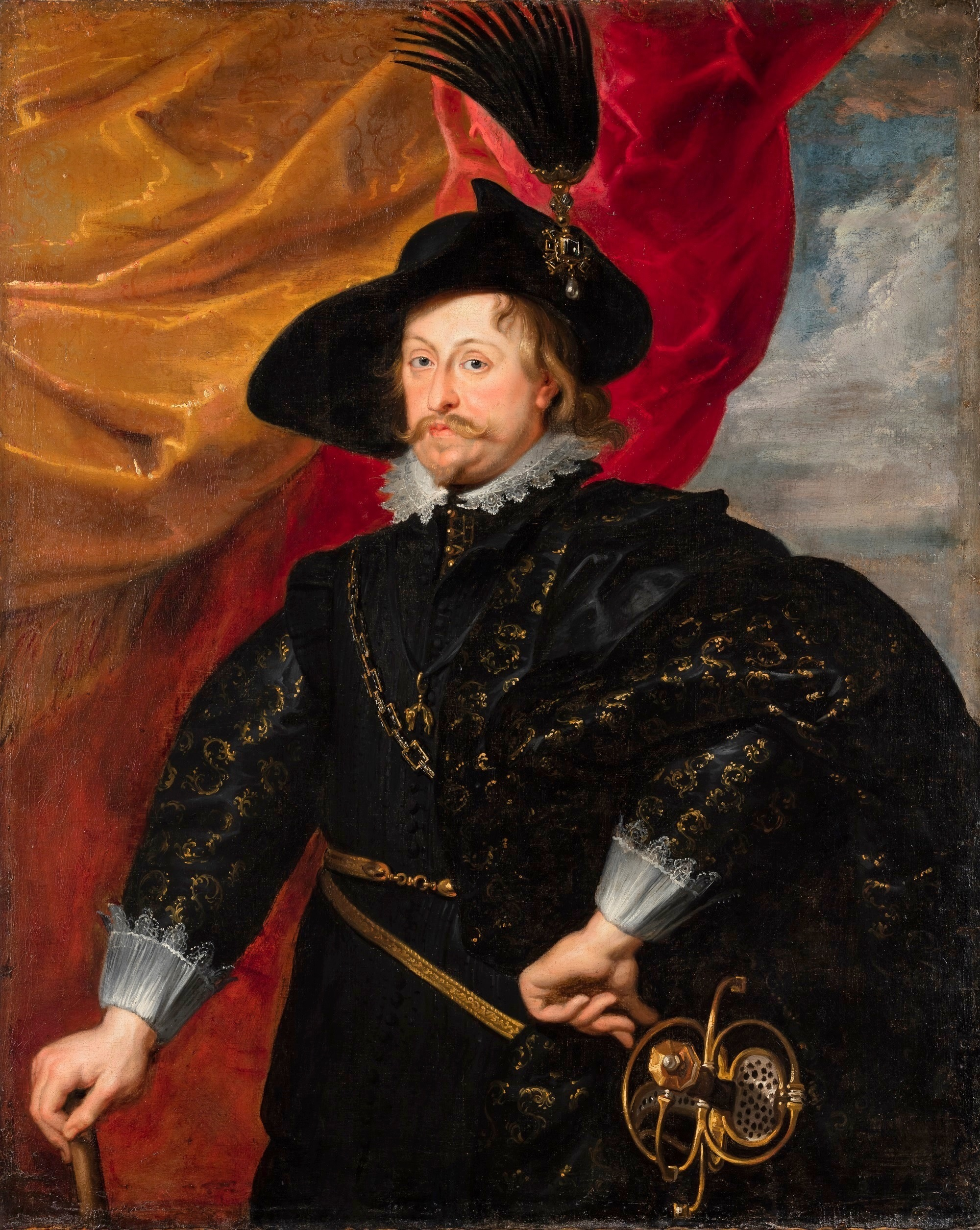
Portrait of Władysław IV Vasa, 1624, Peter Paul Rubens

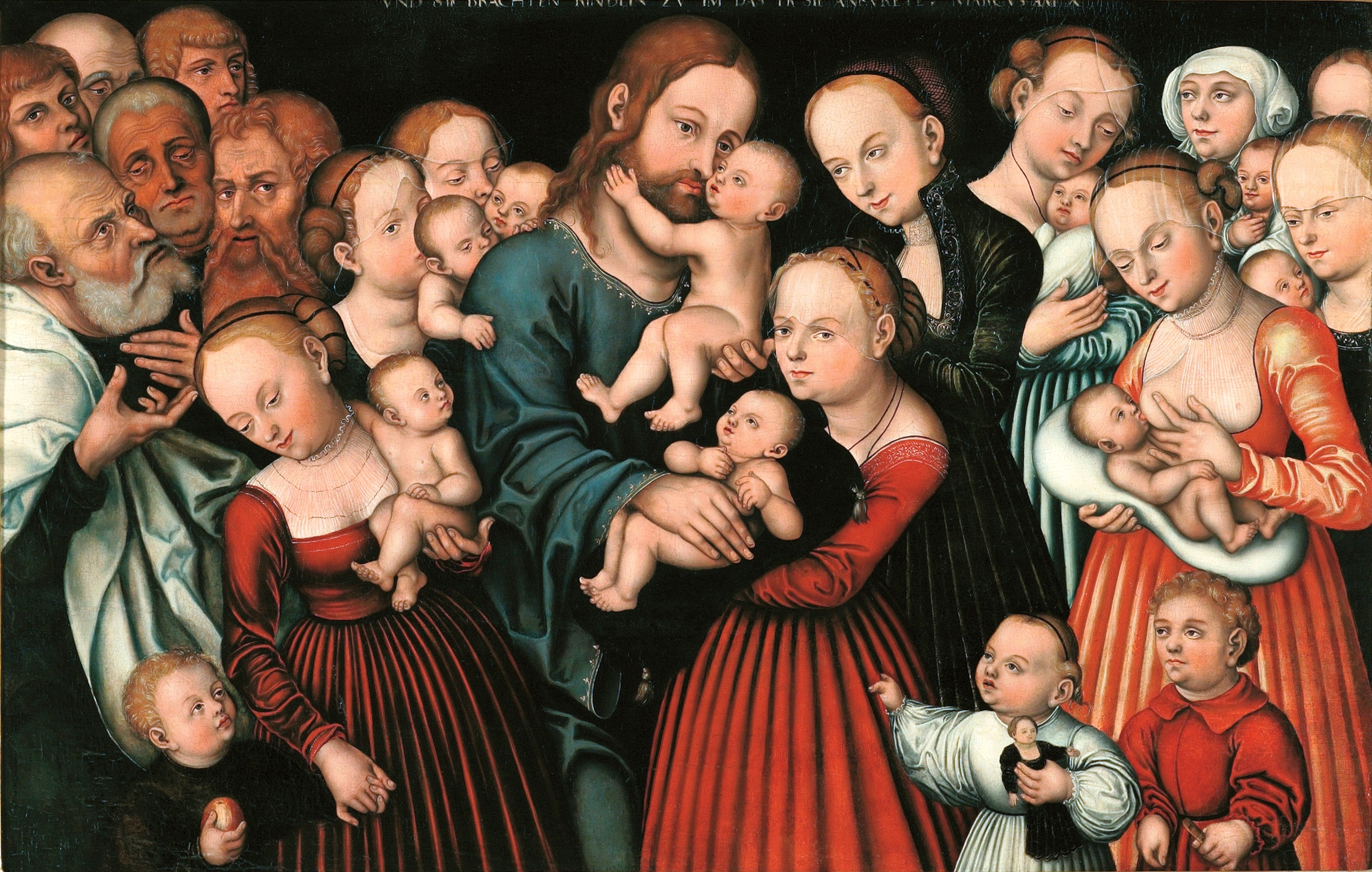
Christ Blessing the Children, 1537, Lucas Cranach the Elder

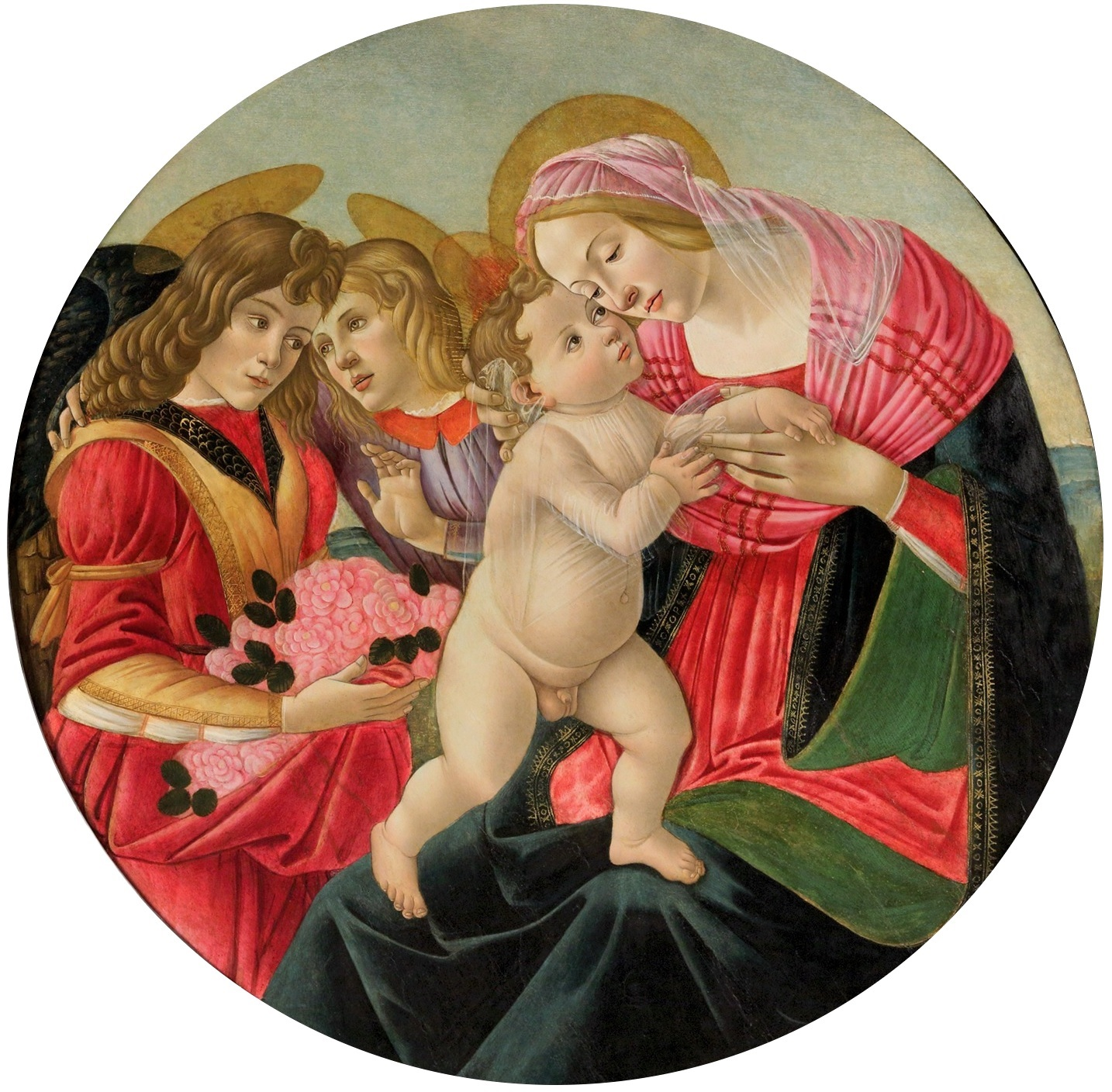
Madonna and Child with Angels, 1475, Sandro Botticelli

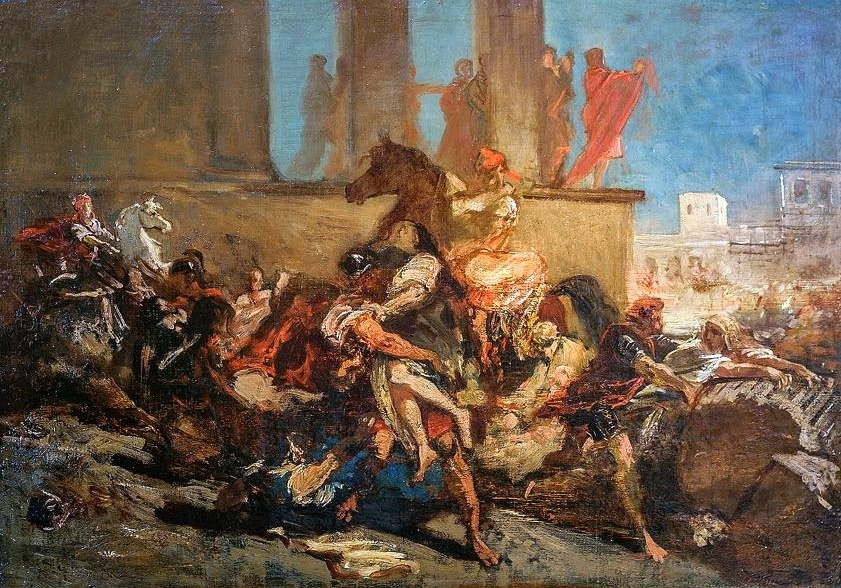
The Rape of the Sabine Women, 19th century, Eugène Delacroix

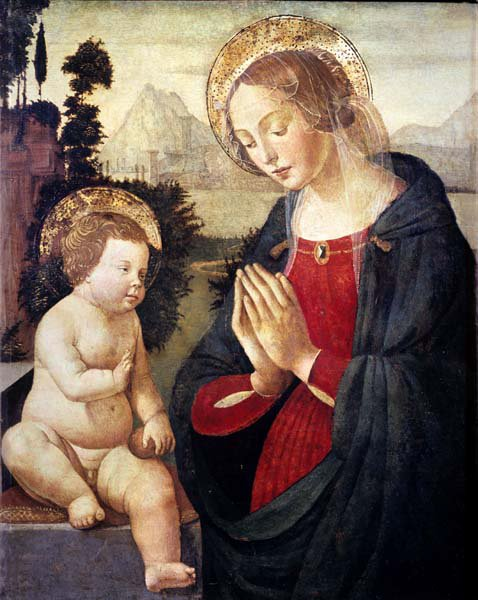
Adoration of the Child, ca. 1490, Domenico Ghirlandaio

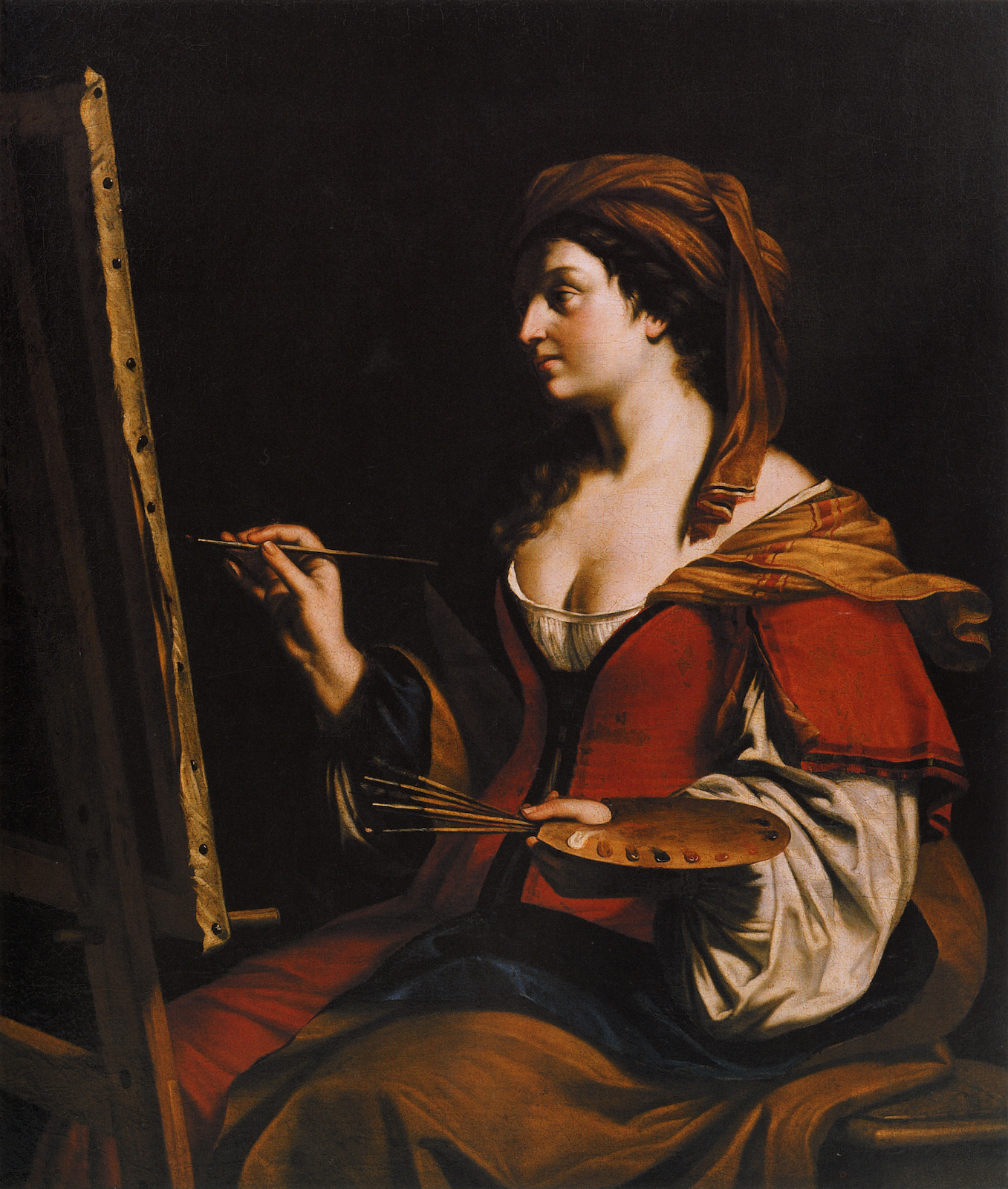
Allegory of Painting, 17th century, Guercino

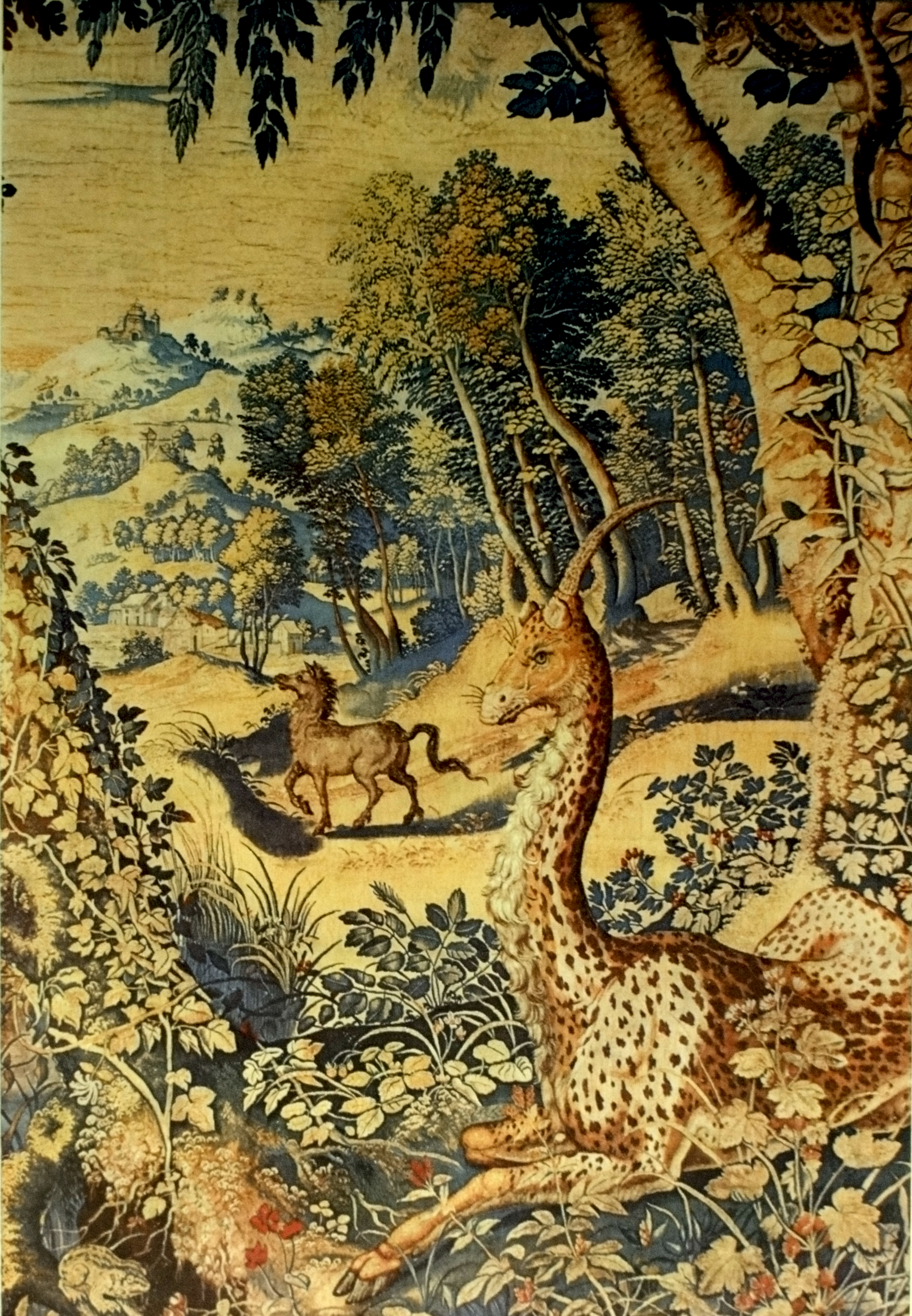
Detail of Lynx and Unicorn, tapestry woven in Brussels to Michiel Coxie's design, ca. 1550

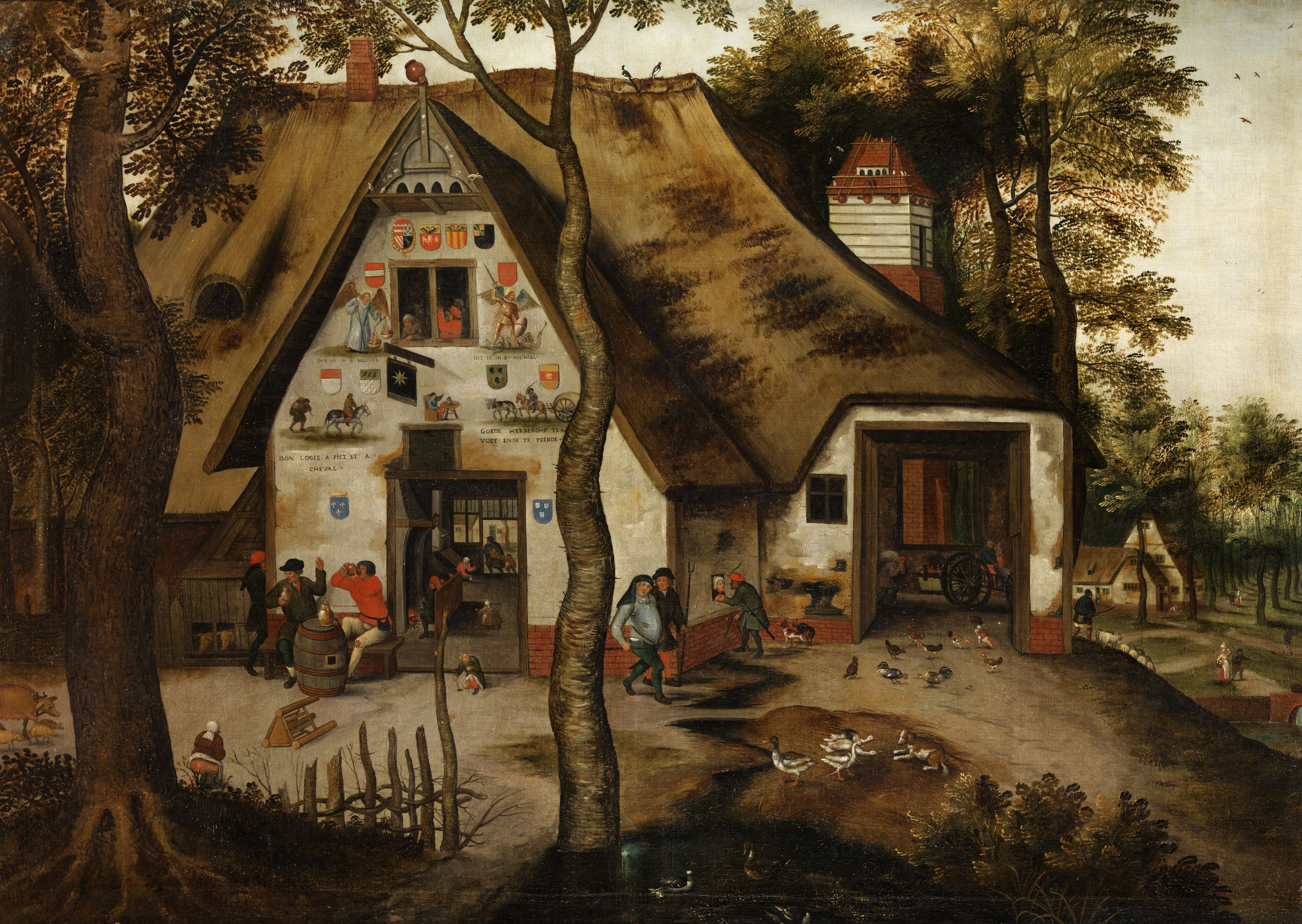
Village Scene with the Inn St. Michael, after 1616, Pieter Brueghel the Younger

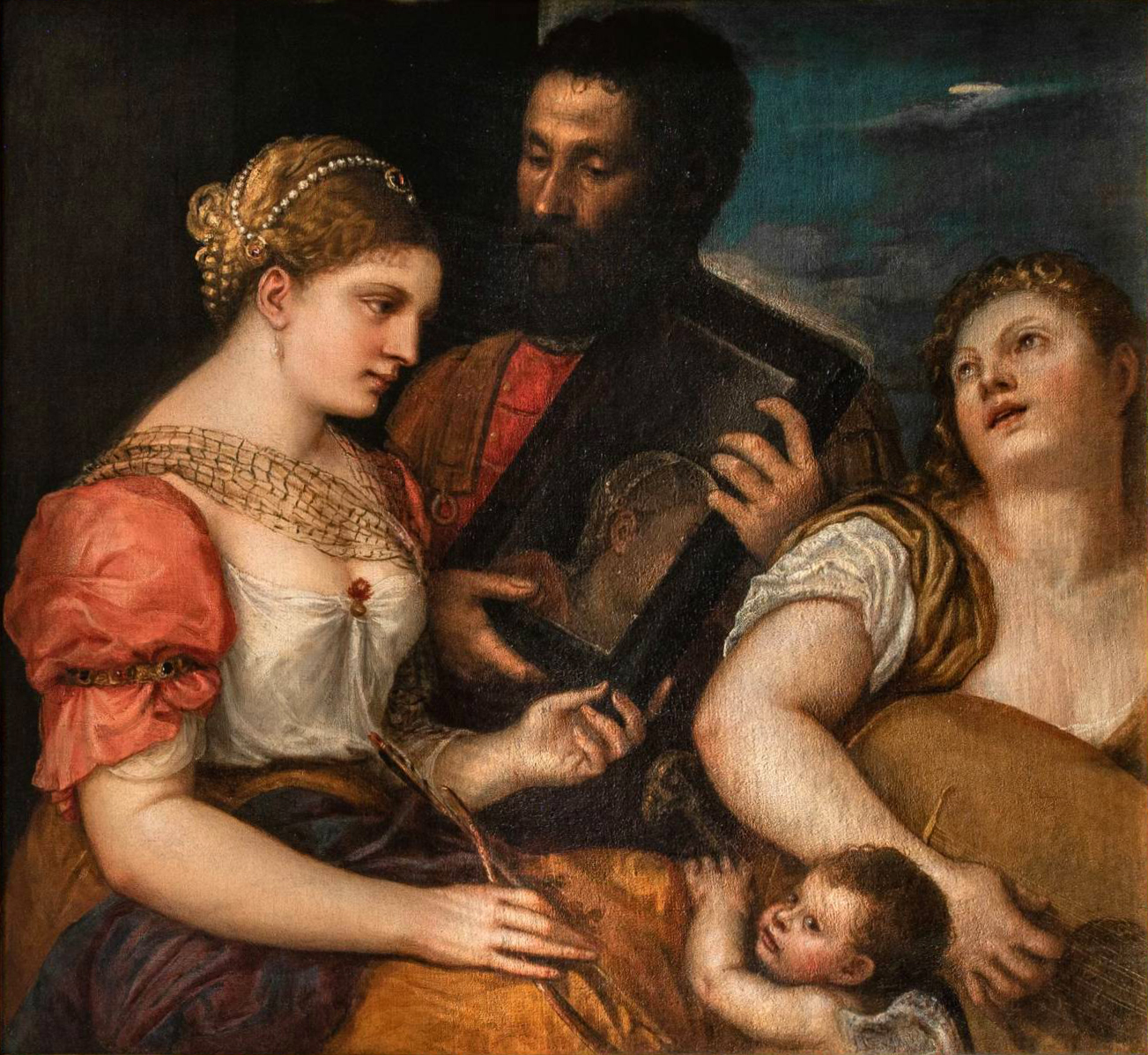
Allegory of Love, 1530s, Titian (and workshop)

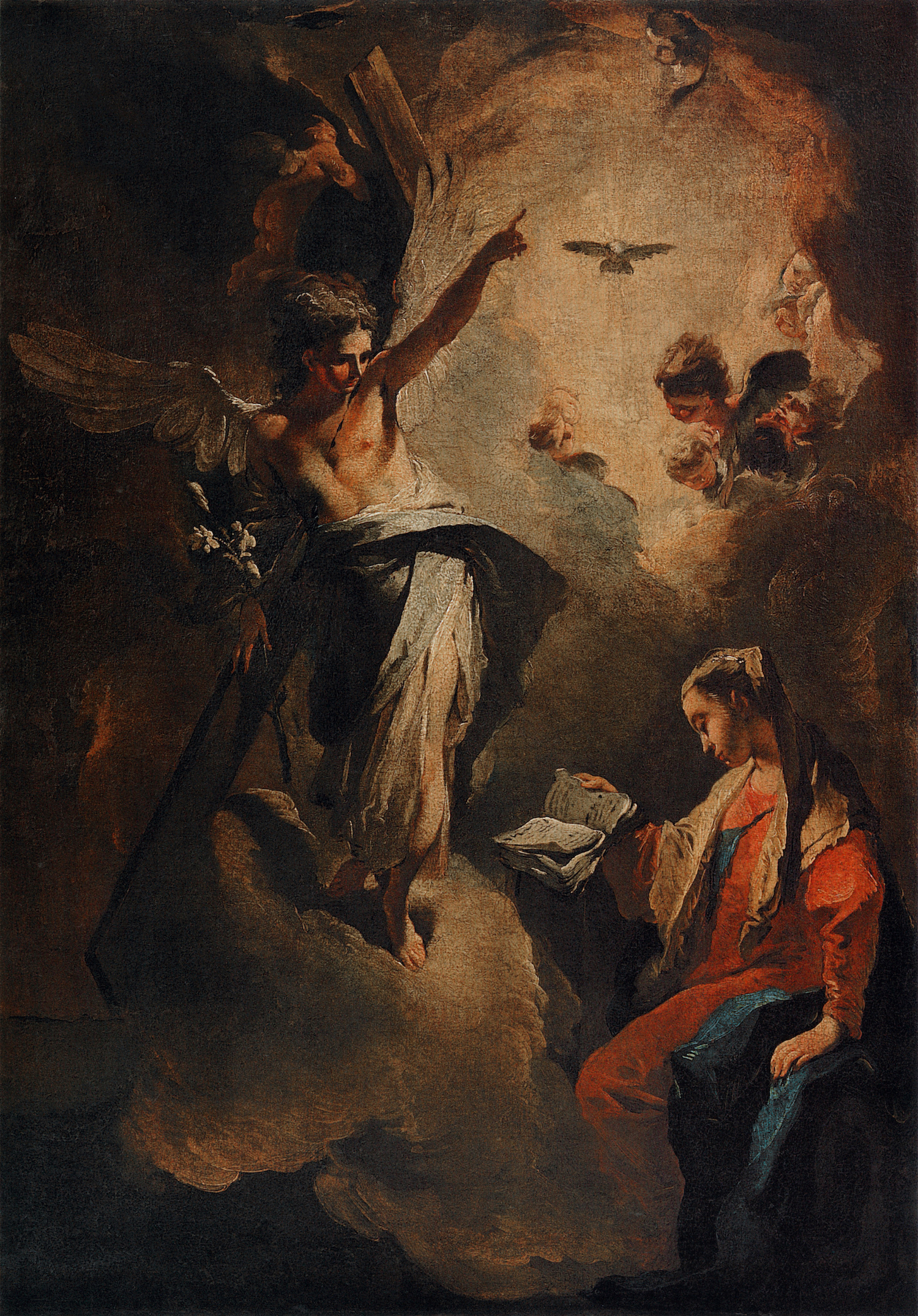
The Annunciation, ca.1725, Giovanni Battista Tiepolo

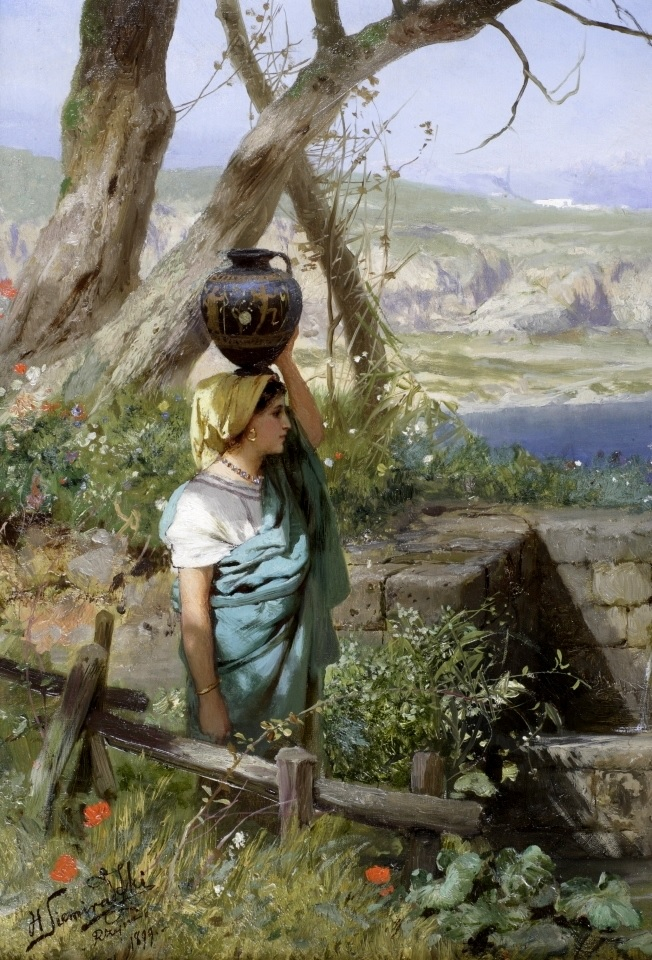
By the Spring, 1899, Henryk Siemiradzki

== See also ==
- Culture of Kraków
- Wawel Royal Castle National Art Collection
- Royal Castle in Warsaw
- Mikołaj Zyblikiewicz
- Wawel Treasures
- Castles in Poland
- Ignaz Sowinski
