= Siege of Kraków Castle =

War of the Bar Confederation siege

Siege of the Kraków Castle
- Part of the war of the Bar Confederation
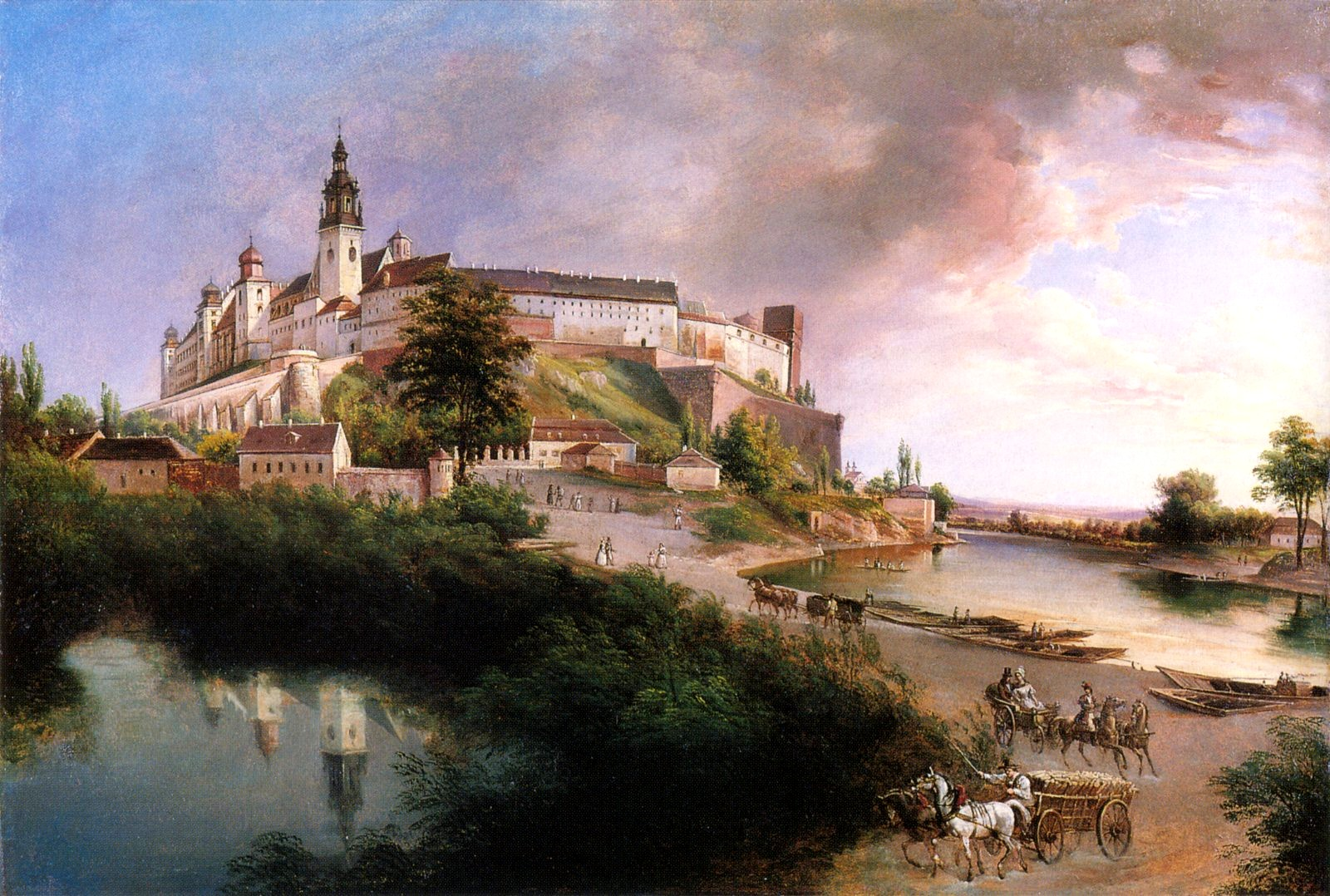
- The Castle of Kraków (1847) by Jan Nepomucen Głowacki
Date	February 4 – April 26, 1772 (Note: Julian calendar/O.S.: Jan. 24 – Apr. 15, 1772) Full dates: 1 March – Storming of the Kraków Castle
Location	Kraków Castle (Wawel Castle), Kraków Voivodeship
Result	Russian victory Full results: Confederate victory – Storming of the Kraków Castle

Belligerents
Russian Empire	Bar Confederation; France

Commanders and leaders
(Russian Empire) Alexander Suvorov (Russian Empire) Col. Stackelberg	(Kingdom of France) Antoine de Vioménil (surrendered) (Kingdom of France) Marquis de Choisy (surrendered)

Strength
About 1,623 (Note: See the Siege section)	Less than 1,000

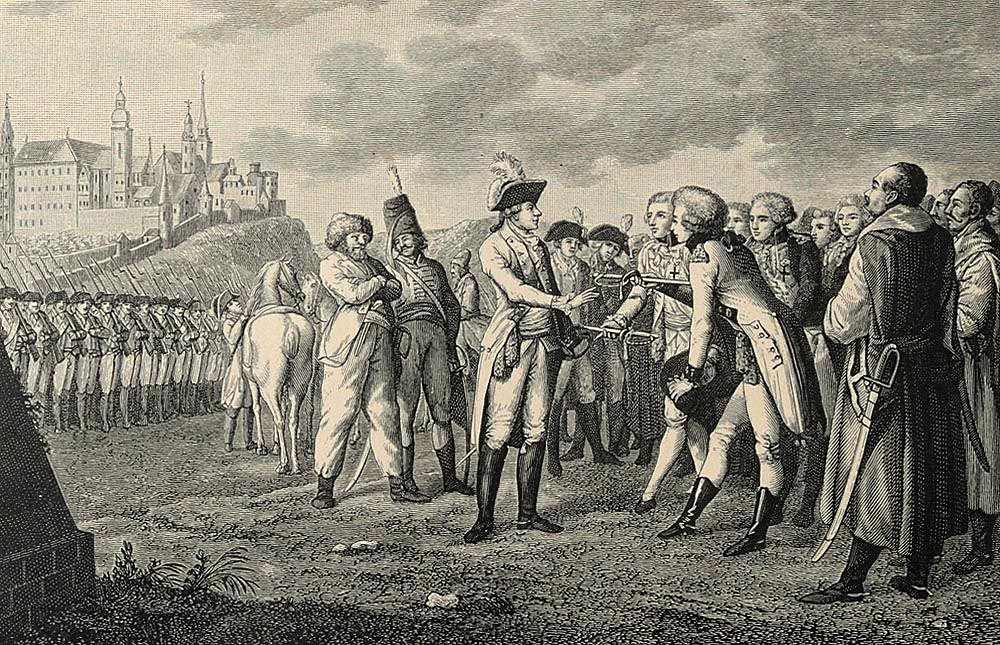
Surrender of the Wawel Royal Castle. French officers pass their swords to Alexander V. Suvorov. author I. D. Schubert

The siege of (the) Kraków Castle was a siege during the War of the Bar Confederation in which the Russian army, led by Alexander Suvorov, captured the Polish castle of Kraków. It took place in 1772, lasted from 4 February to 26 April^{N.S.}.

During the siege, the Confederates organized several sorties, interfering with siege work, and Suvorov carried out an unsuccessful storming of the Kraków Castle on 1 March^{N.S.}, in which the Russians lost up to 150 men.

== Background ==
As early as September 1771, Major-General Baron de Vioménil arrived from France via Vienna to replace Charles Dumouriez, with a number of officers. The centre of Confederate agitation was moved from Eperies to Belitz, on the very border, and Biała, which lay against Belitz itself, was chosen as the main stronghold. From here Vioménil hoped to prevent the conquest of the Confederate strongholds until spring and then, with newly organised and increased forces, to launch an offensive, debuting with the capture of the Kraków Castle (Wawel Castle).

In Kraków was Colonel Stackelberg, Suvorov's successor in command of the Suzdal Regiment. In the Kraków Castle was stored regimental transport, 4 cannon; there were also kept Confederate prisoners of war, contrary to the order of Suvorov, who demanded that they be sent to Lublin. It is said that Stackelberg ordered the removal of a sentry from an important post to please a noble beauty, who, acting in favour of the conspirators, complained that the nightly call of the sentry kept her awake. With this environment, then Vioménil immediately executed his plan.

A few kilometres from Kraków, in Tyniec, Lieutenant-Colonel Choisy of the French service was in command. On the night of 1–2 February 1772, he put most of the Tyniec garrison on ships and crossed the Vistula to Kraków. He approached the castle walls with the greatest caution. He walked with his troop around the town, looking for his own and watching for any sign of their presence in the castle. All was silent. But the Russians, having spotted the enemy, could cut off his retreat to the Tyniec Abbey and take that little fortress, as there were only 200 men garrisoned there. Choisy headed towards Tyniec, leaving Captains Vioménil and Salian with part of the detachment, who had remained under the castle walls, to their fate. After moving away two or three kilometres, he suddenly heard a strong rifle fire in Kraków, stopped and sent a Polish officer to reconnoitre. The officer soon returned and reported that the castle was occupied by Vioménil and Salian. Choisy turned back and marched quickly towards Kraków. At the end of 3 a.m. Vioménil and Salian approached the castle gates. It had snowed heavily the night before, and the men of the detachment wore white priest's clothes over their dress, so as not to excite the attention of the sentries. Not far from the gate there was a hole at the bottom of the castle wall for the drainage of sewage, sealed with an iron grating; the grating was broken out, and there was no sentry at the hole. The Frenchmen got inside the castle without difficulty, rushed upon the guard at the gate, stabbed the sentry, seized the cannons on the platform, and bandaged all the men without firing a shot, and then marched to the main guard and did the same, after the indiscriminate firing of the soldiers who had been taken by surprise.

== Siege ==
The castle was in the Confederate power. Choisy and his detachment then arrived; immediately the gates were blocked from the inside and only the low gate (wicket) was left free. A costume ball was organised in the town that night, at which Stackelberg was also present. The news of the castle capture came to him at the ball, and he resolved to take the castle at once. An incoherent attack was made, but it was repulsed; after it half an hour later another, but also without success; 42 killed and wounded were casualties. At 3 o'clock in the afternoon came reinforcements from Tyniec, additionally strengthened from Belitz. This detachment repulsed the Russians, and the infantry sneaked into the castle, while the cavalry was driven back with the loss of 15 men. On the night of the 4th of February the reinforcements came again and also broke into the castle, losing many men.

In this form the capture of the Kraków Castle is presented according to printed sources and partly according to Stackelberg's report and Suvorov's first investigation. Suvorov was partly to blame for this incident, not giving credence to the denunciations made against Stackelberg and not paying attention to the secret message of a Pole, a supplier of Russian troops, who warned him that there would be an attempt on the Kraków Castle and in proof of the justice of his words showed a letter from his Confederate brother. Suvorov at this time was going to Lithuania; the contractor assured that in Lithuania was conceived only a demonstration to divert the attention of the Russians from Kraków. But Suvorov did not believe it.

The French captured the Kraków Castle with decent but incomplete supplies; some items were plentiful, others scarce. These disadvantages soon took their toll, for the garrison consisted of just under 1,000 men. As for Suvorov's forces at Kraków, they could not be great. A total of 3,246 men were under his command at the beginning of the year, distributed in five main points. Under Kraków could hardly be collected more than half; including about 800 infantrymen.

The besieged, seeing their critical situation and expecting worse to come, made several violent sorties, which, however, did them much more harm than the Russians, as wounded men were added. At one of these sorties, the commander of the Suzdal company, located near the castle, Captain Likharyov, became frightened and abandoned his post, and the company, left without a commander, ran in disorder, hotly pursued. It was about noon; Suvorov was resting. Awakened by the shooting and shouting, he jumped up and galloped towards the shots. Meeting the fleeing men, he halted them, arranged and commanded them to attack by bayonets. The sortie retreated, but the Suzdal company lost up to 30 men. Suvorov arrested Likharyov and kept him under arrest for about 4 months. In the order he said that for such a misdemeanour he should have put the captain on trial, "but as he had no other malice, and as he has been under arrest for a long time, he is young, and has rarely been in action, release".

For the lack of Russian siege artillery, the breach was not moving well. Suvorov also made an unsuccessful storming during the siege (1 March [O.S. 18 February] 1772): on reaching the main gate and cutting through it with axes, the stormers engaged in a skirmish with the besieged through the hole, as the leader of the column lacked the resolve to strike. Another column that reached the wicket was without a leader. The men of the third column, having ladders against the wall, climbed with intrepidity into the embrasures where the cannons stood, but met the same courage in their opponents. For four hours the fruitless effort continued; at 6 a.m. the Russians retreated, having lost upwards to 150 men.

At the beginning of April, guns of large calibre arrived at Suvorov's place and a breach-battery was erected hidden from the Confederate forces. It collapsed part of the wall at the gate, broke through the breach and caused several fires in the castle; the Polish engineer had meanwhile finished the mine galleries. The castle was severely starved, the number of the sick was constantly increasing, and desertion developed to enormous proportions.

== Capitulation ==
April 19, at night one of the officers, Galibert, appeared from the castle and was brought blindfolded to Suvorov. Suvorov received him affectionately, sat near him and dictated the main articles of capitulation. The terms offered were very favourable, because Suvorov wished a speedy surrender, but this favourable condition gave Choisy hope of still greater leniency on the Russian side. The next day morning, Galibert appeared again, was treated to a good breakfast, but when the speech on capitulation came on, he began to raise objections. Suvorov decided to end further puffs at once. He announced to Galibert new conditions, stricter than the previous ones, adding that if Galibert will appear again without the authority to accept the proposed items, he will receive conditions even more severe. The deadline for a reply Suvorov appointed the next day.

Choisy realised his mistake, and Galibert arrived at the Russian blockade detachment before the deadline with full consent. The substance of the capitulation concluded on 23 April was as follows. The surrender took place three days later; the men of the garrison retain their private possessions; all other property in the castle is surrendered. The French are not surrendered as prisoners of war, but simply as prisoners, as there is no war between Russia and France, and exchange is impossible (this point was insisted by Suvorov). Upon capturing the castle, the Russians took 700 prisoners. Vioménil's Frenchmen would be transported to Lwów; Dumouriez's Frenchmen to Biała and in Lithuania; Polish Confederates to Smolensk. Non-military persons would go wherever they wish; the sick and prisoners who are unable to endure the long journey would be properly assisted.

Choisy presented his sword to Suvorov, followed by all the other French officers. Suvorov did not accept the swords, embraced Choisy and kissed him. The officers were then treated to breakfast, and Franciszek Ksawery Branicki invited them to dinner. To the head of the escort, Colonel Shevelyov, Suvorov gave on 28 April the instruction: "to keep them very affectionately".

Empress Catherine rewarded Suvorov for the capture of Kraków 1,000 chervonets, and on his subordinates, participants in this affair, granted 10,000 rubles. At last, to Suvorov's pleasure, who was tired of his diplomatic role, a treaty was signed between Austria, Prussia, and Russia for the Partition between them of a portion of Poland. Two Russian corps entered it; one of them, Ivan Karpovich Elmpt's, halted in Lithuania.

== Sources ==
- Anthing, Johann Friedrich (1813). History of the Campaigns of Count Alexander Suworow-Rymnikski. London: W. Green and T. Chaplin. pp. 30–35.
- Longworth, Philip (1966). The Art of Victory: The Life and Achievements of Field-Marshal Suvorov, 1729–1800. Holt, Rinehart and Winston. pp. 65–71.
- Osipov, K. (1939). Alexander Suvorov. Translated by Bone, Edith. London, New York, and Melbourne: Hutchinson & Co. (Publishers) Ltd. pp. 42–43.
- Russell, William (1837). The History of Modern Europe. London: Longman, Rees, & Co. p. 539.
- de Saint-Amand, Imbert (1915). The Youth of the Duchess of Angoulême. New York City: Charles Scribner's Sons. p. 237.
- Hassall, Arthur (1896). The Balance of Power, 1715–1789. London: Macmillan & Co. pp. 312–314.
- Petrushevsky, Alexander (1884). Генералиссимус князь Суворов [Generalissimo Prince Suvorov] (in Russian). Vol. 1 (1st ed.). Saint Petersburg: Типография М. М. Стасюлевича. pp. 127–136.
