= Przasnysz =

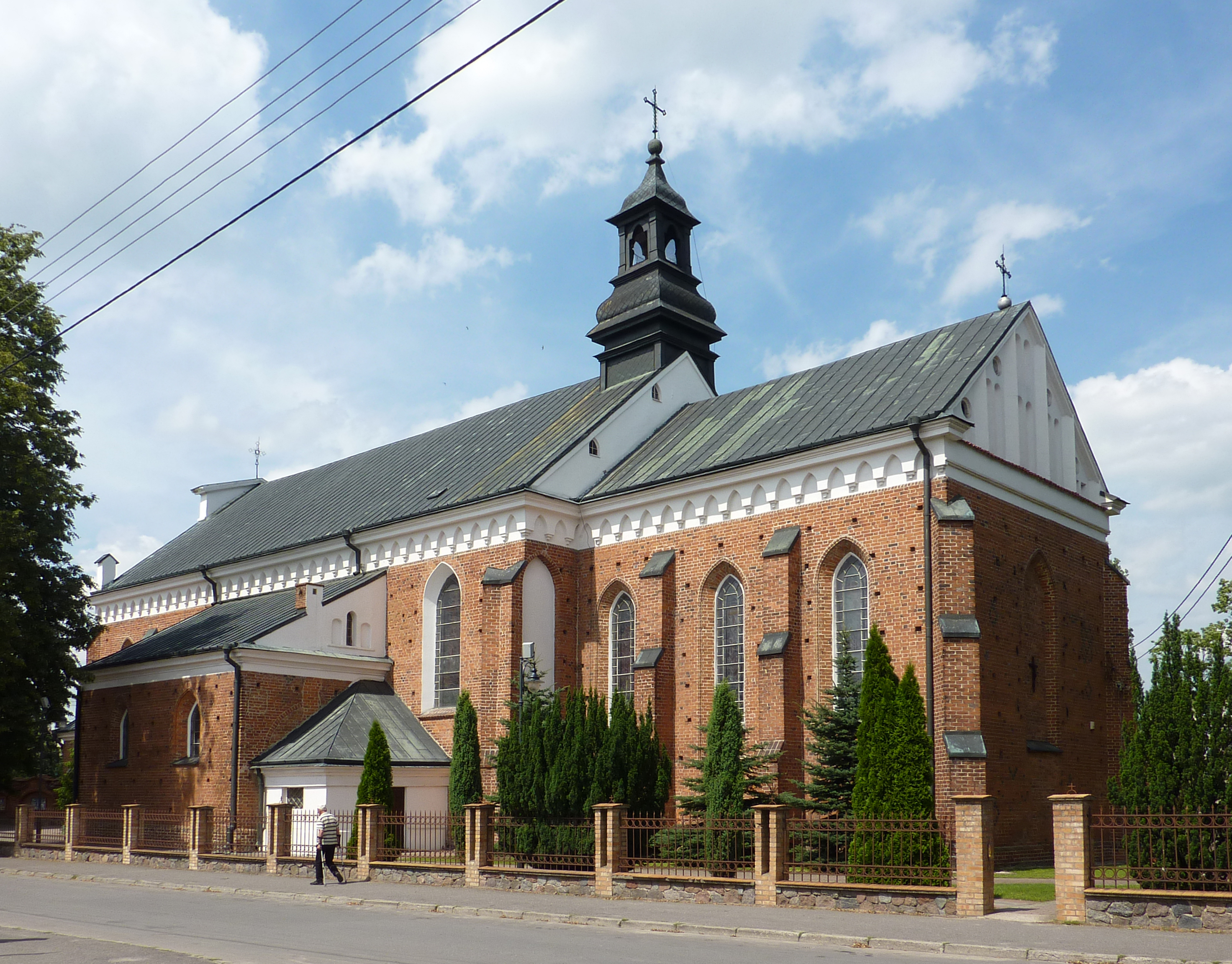
- Church of the Assumption

- Flag Coat of arms

- Location within Poland
- Coordinates: 53°1′N 20°53′E
- Country: Poland
- Voivodeship: Masovian
- County: Przasnysz
- Gmina: Przasnysz (urban gmina)
- Established: 13th century
- Town rights: 1427

Government
  - Mayor: Łukasz Chrostowski

Area
  - Total: 25.16 km^{2} (9.71 sq mi)

Population (2013)
  - Total: 17,326
  - Density: 688.6/km^{2} (1,784/sq mi)
- Time zone: UTC+1 (CET)
  - Summer (DST): UTC+2 (CEST)
- Postal code: 06-300
- Area code: +48 29
- Vehicle registration: WPZ
- Website: http://www.przasnysz.um.gov.pl

Przasnysz ([ˈpʂasnɨʂ]) is a town in north-central Poland, located in the Masovian Voivodship, about 110 km (68 mi) north of Warsaw and about 115 km (71 mi) south of Olsztyn. It is the capital of Przasnysz County. It has 18,093 inhabitants (2004). It was one of the most important towns in Mazovia during the Middle Ages. Przasnysz was granted town privileges in 1427.

== History ==
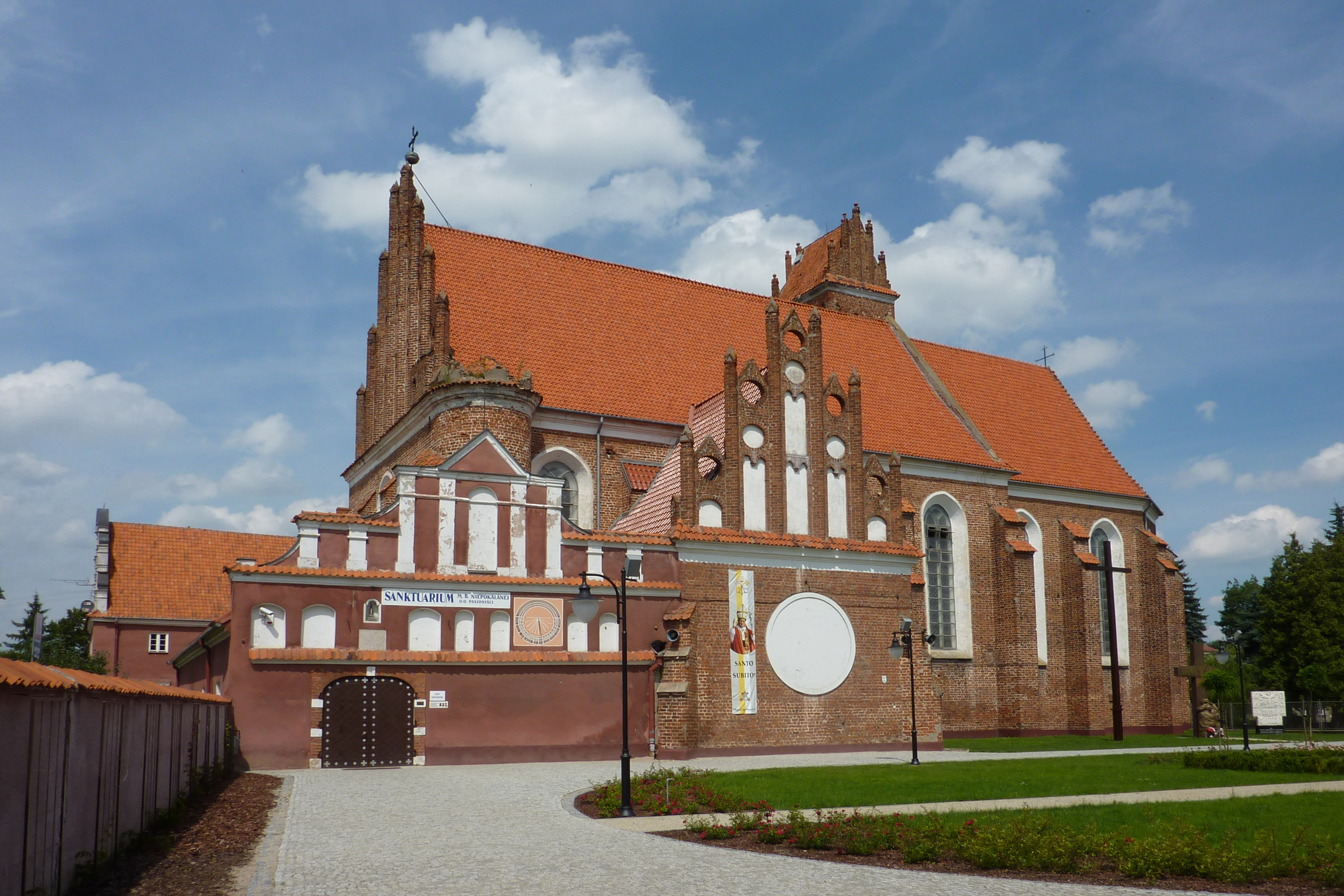
Gothic Church of St. Jacob and St. Anne and Passionist Monastery

The oldest traces of settlement in the area of Przasnysz come from the turn of the Bronze and Iron Age (around 700 BC). In the 13th century in Przasnysz, on the Węgierka River, there was a market settlement. There was also a hunting court of the Mazovian princes, described by Henryk Sienkiewicz in The Knights of the Cross. The name of the city according to folk sources comes from the miller Przaśnik, who hosted the stray hunting Duke Konrad I of Masovia and was then knighted with the surrounding lands.

Przasnysz's rapid development was due to its favorable location on the border between two economically important areas – the Kurpiowska Plain and the agricultural Ciechanowska Upland. On 10 October 1427 Przasnysz obtained town privileges under the Chełmno law from the Masovian Duke Janusz I of Warsaw. The town flourished in the 16th century, especially after the incorporation of Mazovia into the Crown in 1526. Przasnysz was a royal town and a county seat in the Ciechanów Land in the Masovian Voivodeship in the Greater Poland Province of the Kingdom of Poland.

In 1576, Przasnysz became the seat of the non-castle starostwo (eldership). In 1648, the Przasnysz eldership was awarded to the defender of Zbaraż, Prince Jeremi Wiśniowiecki.

=== Partitions of Poland ===
After the defeat of the Kościuszko Uprising and the Third Partition of Poland (1795), Przasnysz became part of the Kingdom of Prussia as the seat of a large county including Ciechanów.

On 30 January 1807 Napoleon Bonaparte made a visit to Przasnysz.

In the years 1807–1815 Przasnysz was part of the Duchy of Warsaw, and then, after the Congress of Vienna, became part of so-called Congress Poland, which was part of the Russian Empire. In November 1863, Przasnysz was the site of a Russian execution of Stefan Cielecki, commander of a Polish insurgent unit, which fought in northern Masovia during the January Uprising.

During World War I, in November and December 1914, heavy fighting took place near Przasnysz between the Russian and German armies. The city changed hands many times. On 24 February 1915 it was taken by the Germans, but on 27 February they were forced out by Russian troops from the First and Second Siberian Corps.

=== Interbellum ===
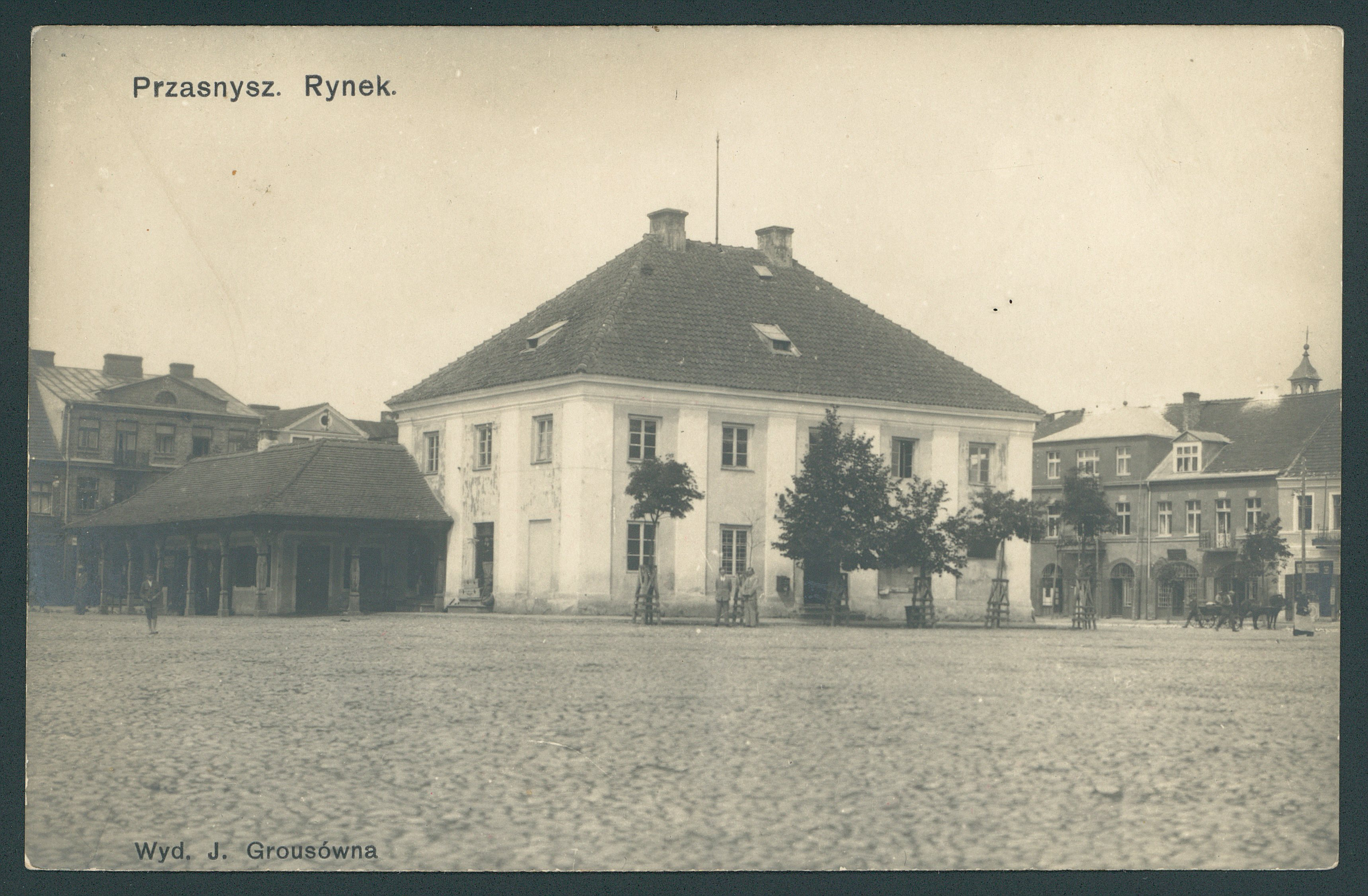
Market Square in 1930

Poland regained independence after World War I in 1918, and Przasnysz was reintegrated with the reborn state. In August 1920, extremely fierce battles with the Bolshevik 15 Army took place near Przasnysz. For two weeks the city was occupied by the Soviet army. On 21 August Przasnysz was liberated by the 202 Infantry Regiment of the Volunteer Division of Colonel Adam Koc.

In the interwar period, Przasnysz was the capital of the poviat in the Warsaw Voivodeship. In the first years of independence, reconstruction from war damage continued. Many public buildings were built: power plant, junior high school and elementary school, agricultural school, city theater, stadium and sports house. The main occupation of the inhabitants of Przasnysz was still agriculture, craft and small trade. In 1938, Przasnysz had 8,000 residents, including approx. 3,000 Jews.

=== World War II ===
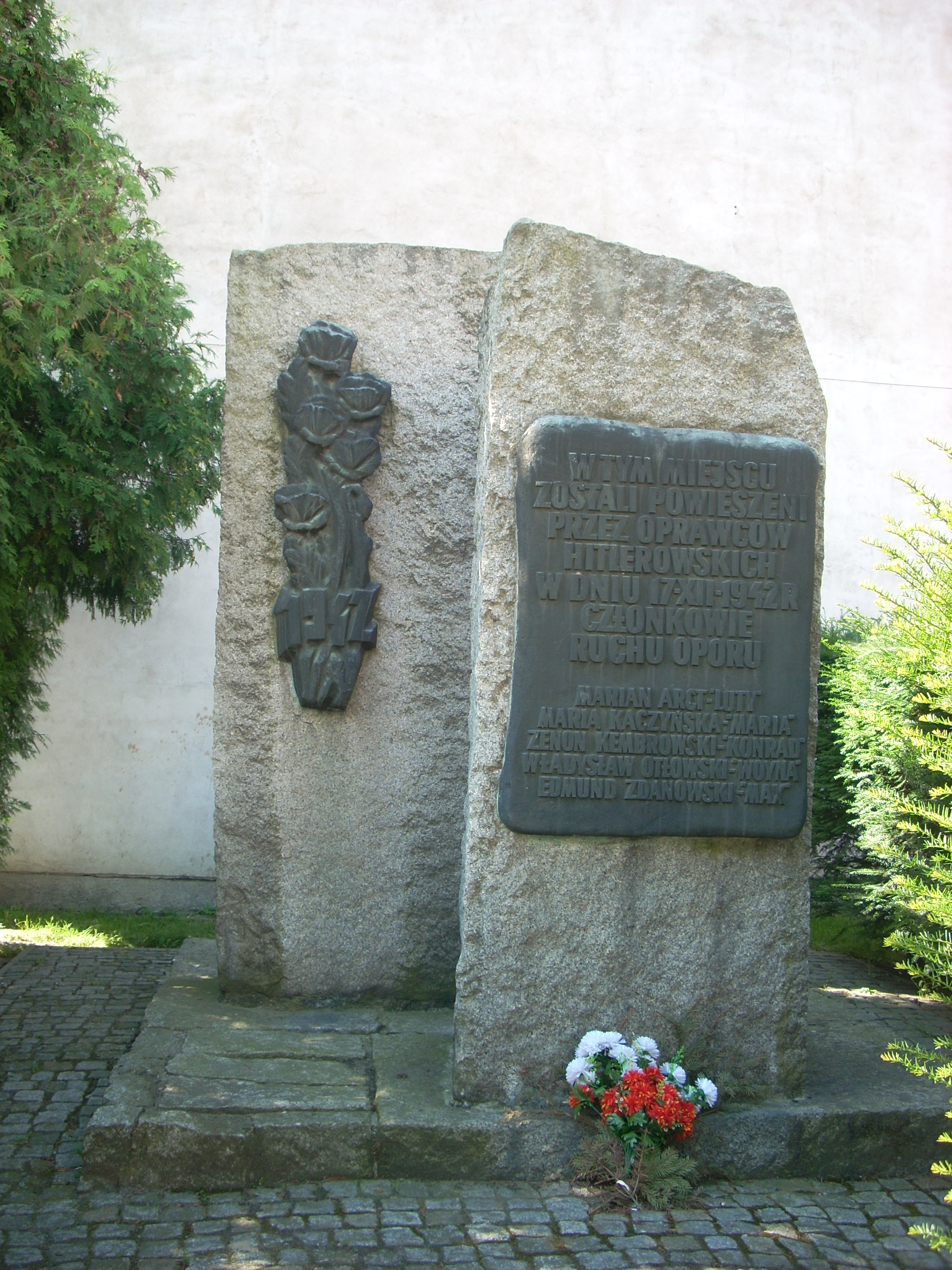
Monument in the place where the Germans hanged five members of the Polish resistance on 17 December 1942

In the first days of the German invasion of Poland, which started World War II in September 1939, heavy fighting occurred nearby, between the Mazowiecka Cavalry Brigade under the command of Colonel Jan Karcz and the Germans. Afterwards the town was occupied by Germany and annexed directly into the Third Reich. It was renamed Praschnitz.

On 10 September 1939 the Einsatzgruppe V entered the town to commit various crimes against the populace. It immediately carried out mass searches of Polish offices, courts and organizations, arrested dozens of Poles, and expelled 70 Jews. The German police established a prison for Poles in the town, and a special court. In October and November 1939, the Germans executed 11 Poles at the local cemetery. Families of the victims were expelled to the so-called General Government. Local teachers and school principals were among Polish teachers and principals murdered in the Mauthausen concentration camp. 18 Poles from the town and county were murdered by the Russians in the Katyn massacre in 1940, including pre-war starosta Zygmunt Młot-Przepałkowski and the chief of the local police Zygmunt Pampuch. On 3–4 December 1940 the German gendarmerie expelled around 500 Poles, including old, ill and disabled people, who were then held for several days in a camp in Działdowo and afterwards deported in freight trains to the Kraków District of the General Government. A penal "education" forced labour camp was operated in the town from 1941 to 1943. There was a high death rate in the camp due to hunger, diseases, tortures and executions.

Despite such circumstances, Poles still managed to organize an underground resistance movement. On 17 December 1942 the Germans hanged five local leaders of Home Army at the main square.

On 17 January 1945, the retreating Germans deported 31 malnourished Polish prisoners from Przasnysz to Mława, then to Działdowo, Rypin, Sierpc and eventually Płock, where they were massacred on 19 January along with other Poles from Płock by the Gestapo. Shortly after the Soviet Army seized the city on 18 January 1945, the NKVD began mass arrests and deportations of Polish patriots. The town then was restored to Poland, although with a Soviet-installed communist regime, which remained in power until the Fall of Communism in the 1980s.

=== Recent times ===
In the years 1945–1951, numerous armed units of the anti-communist underground operated near Przasnysz.

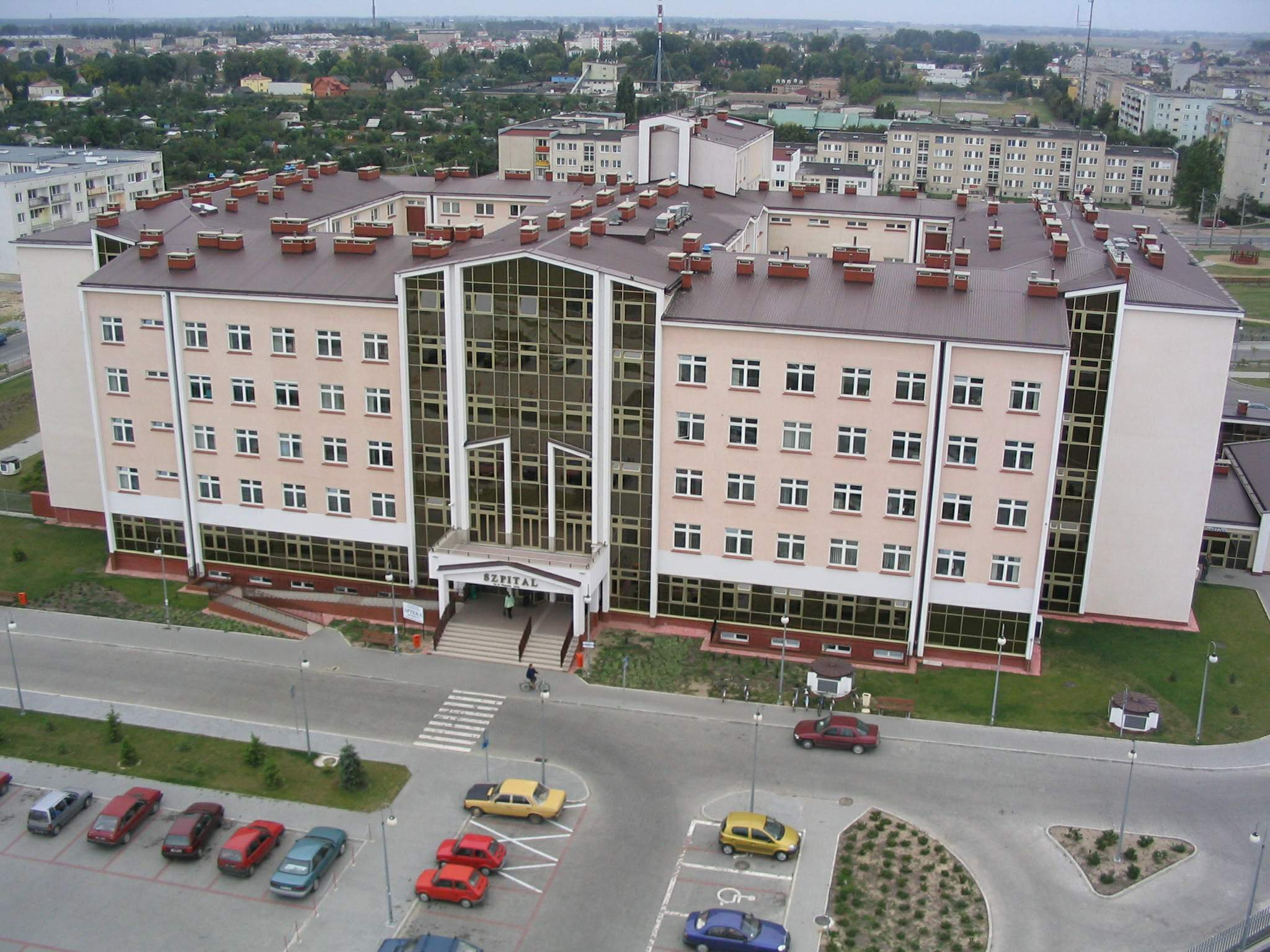
Wojciech Oczko Hospital in Przasnysz

In the 1960s, the rapid development of the city began, slowed as a result of the administrative reform of 1975. In 1966, a branch of Zakład Aparatury Gospodarcza im. Georgi Dimitrov, where lightning arrestors were produced. For the needs of this plant, a school complex was established to house a vocational school and technical college.

Since 1 January 1999 Przasnysz is the seat of the county in the Masovian Voivodeship.

== Sports ==
The local football club is MKS Przasnysz. It competes in the lower leagues.

== Notable people ==
- Helga Adler (born 1943), German academic and politician (SED/PDS)
- Stanisław Chełchowski (1866–1907), Polish naturalist and ethnographist
- Moisei Freidenberg (1858–1920), Russian inventor and journalist
- Aleksander Kakowski (1862–1938), Archbishop of Warsaw
- Stanisław Kostka (1550–1568), patron of children in the Catholic Church
- Bernard Kryszkiewicz (1915–1945), Passionist priest
- Abraham Lichtstein, Av Beis Din (head of the rabbinical court) of Przasnysz
- Józef Stanisław Ostoja-Kotkowski (1922–1994), artist
- Józef Sawa-Caliński (died 1771), one of the leaders of the Bar Confederation

== Coat of arms ==
The coat of arms of Przasnysz depicts a defensive wall made of red brick on a silver (white) shield, with three such towers of equal height. Each tower is covered with a conical red roof. Each tower has an entrance gate and one soaring hole above it, both black. Heraldic shield border black.

The heraldic image dates from the 16th century.

=== Jewish cemetery ===
There is an old Jewish cemetery used by the previous substantial Jewish population (36% of the population. It is located about 750 meters southeast of the market square on Lesno St. It was mostly destroyed during WWII and further impacted by land-use policy since. There is an active restoration project. It was approximately 1.5 hectares before the war, it is currently about 1.2 hectares. There is a memorial in a shape of two tombstones, built in 1986, with Hebrew and Polish inscriptions: "In remembrance of those who lived among us". The lower part of the memorial is a lapidarium constructed of displaced gravestones.
