= Kenafe Nesharim =

Kanfe Nesharim (Hebrew: כַּנְפֵי נְשָׁרִים, romanized: Wings of Gyps fulvus, the Eurasian griffon vulture) may refer to:

- Operation Magic Carpet (Yemen), the 1949–1950 operation to airlift Yemenite Jews to Israel
- Kanfei Nesharim Street, in West Jerusalem
- Kanfe Nesharim, a commentary on the Torah by Abraham Lichtstein

== See also ==
- Kanaf
- Nesher
- Nasr (name)
