= Adam Stanisław Krasiński =

Polish noble (szlachta)

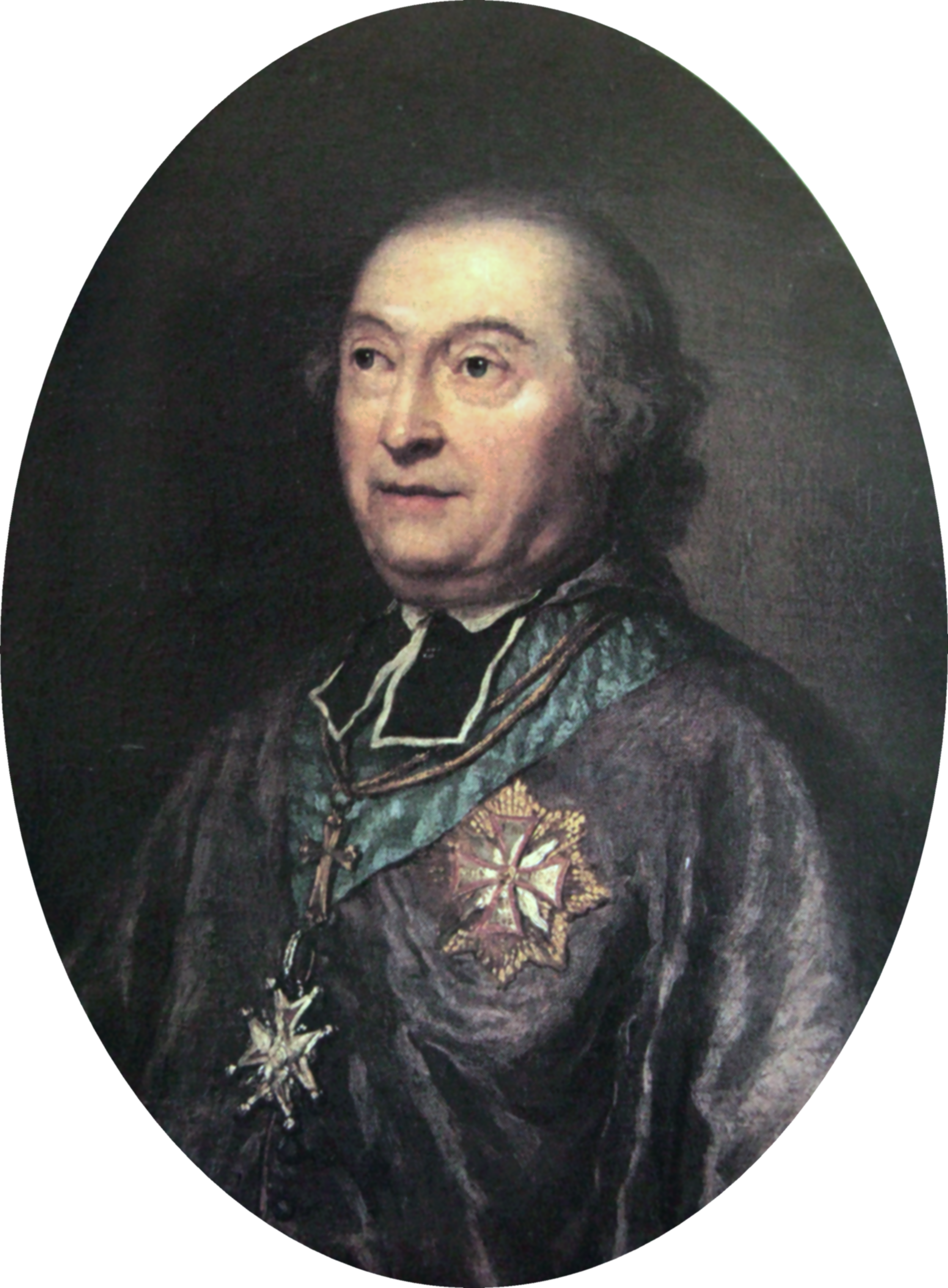
- Known for: One of the leaders of the Bar Confederation
- Born: 1714
- Died: 1800 (aged 85–86)
- Noble family: Michał Hieronim Krasiński (brother)
- Parents: Jan Krasiński

Adam Stanisław Krasiński (1714–1800) was a Polish noble (szlachcic) affiliated with the Ślepowron coat of arms. The son of Polish nobleman Jan Krasiński, he served as bishop of Kamieniec from 1757 to 1798 and as Great Crown Secretary beginning in 1752. In 1759,

He was president of the Crown Tribunal in 1759 and was one of the leaders of the Bar Confederation (1768–1772).

== Early life and education ==
He was born on 4 April 1714, as son of Jan Krasiński and Elżbieta Teresa Sołtyk, brother of Michał Hieronim Krasiński. In his early years he was a supporter of king Stanisław Leszczyński during the War of the Polish Succession which begun in 1733.

A year later he joined the Dzików Confederation and acted as its diplomatic emissary to Paris. He attended universities in Paris, and later, in 1737, in Rome.

== Early career ==
In 1747 he matriculated from the Jagiellonian University. With support of Andrzej Stanisław Załuski he became canon of Płock and joined the chancellery of king Augustus III of Poland. In 1751 he was Płock's delegate to the Crown Tribunal.

Next year, in 1752, with support of Jerzy August Mniszechhe became the Great Crown Secretary. In 1753 he became the canon of Gniezno. In 1757 he became the prelate scholasticus of Gniezno and received the Order of the White Eagle. In 1758 he was the president of the Crown Tribunal and became the bishop of Kamieniec (now Kamianets-Podilskyi).

Opponent of Familia's reforms in 1763; supporter of the hetman's faction and House of Wettin. In 1764 his actions interrupted the sejmik in Grudziądz. Political opponent of Familia's King Stanisław August Poniatowski. Joined the Radom Confederation in 1767 and for a short time supported Gabriel Podoski and Nicholas Repnin's plans against Poniatowski.

== Bar Confederation and reformism ==
From 1768 to 1772 one of the leaders of the Bar Confederation, considered by some to be the first Polish uprising. It was formed by Polish nobility who opposed Russian intervention into Polish internal politics; Krasiński also criticized the Holy See for its silence on the matter of arrest of several Polish nobles during that time, including two bishops (Kajetan Ignaty Sołtyk and Józef Andrzej Załuski, by the Russians. In the Bar Confederation he became their most important diplomat, responsible for many negotiations and their relations with foreign powers. In October 1768 he went to Paris where he was received by King Louis XV who promised support for the confederates.

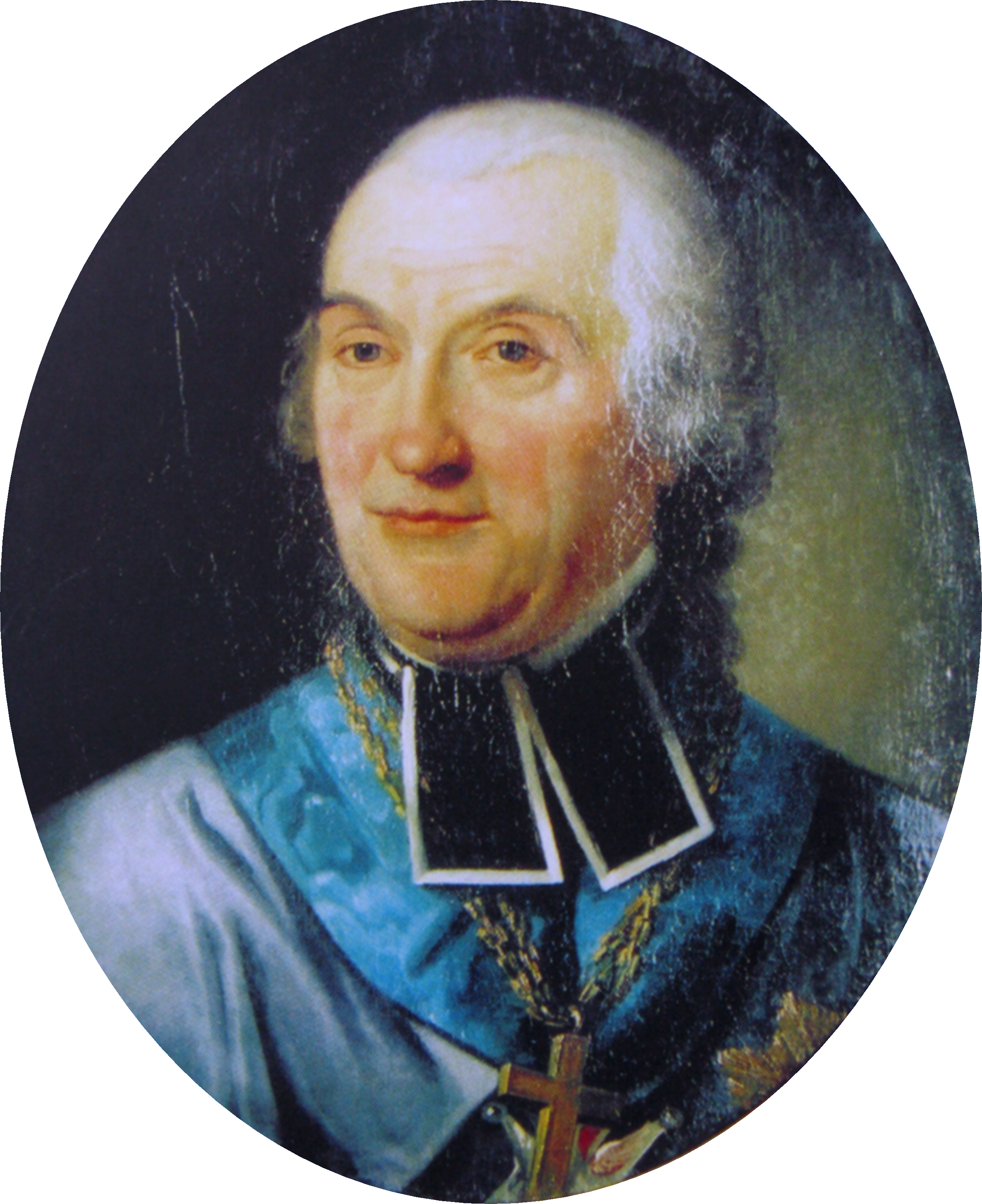
Another depiction of Krasiński

In 1769 he advocated the assassination of King Poniatowski, later that year he became the head of the confederate's government in Biała. In 1770 he went to Dresden to gain support from the Holy Roman Empire; later that year he met Joseph II, Holy Roman Emperor and received an offer of help from him. Also he did not support the declaration that King Poniatowski is not the legitimate king of Poland, he nonetheless supported Frederick Augustus I of Saxony as a counter-candidate.

He was likely one of the supporters or even the ring-leader of the plan to kidnap Poniatowski, eventually carried by Casimir Pulaski in 1771. That plan nonetheless backfired, as Poniatowski not only escaped but this action caused much controversy in Europe and resulted in loss of much international support for the confederates. Eventually in 1772 he began negotiations with the King about surrender of the confederates; later that year he himself was kidnapped by the Cossacks and temporarily imprisoned in Warsaw. He was nonetheless set free after he pledged loyalty to the king and regained his posts in the Polish–Lithuanian Commonwealth.

After 1772, he distanced himself from political life until the reforms of the late 1780s. In 1780, 1782, 1784 and 1786 he was the president of the Sejm court. In 1787 ordered the reconstruction of fortress in Kamieniec. During the Great Sejm, he was one of the most active supporter of the Constitution of 3 May 1791, publishing projects and papers supporting it, and eventually taking part in the semi-coup that resulted in its declaration. Notably, he commented on behaviour of one of the constitution opponents, Jan Sucharzewski (who threatened to kill himself and his young son to 'spare them the fate of living under this restrictive law') saying 'shave his head and send him to the asylum'. Vocal opponent of Targowica Confederation, which after its victory punished him by abolishing his diocese. Supporter of Kościuszko Uprising; he collected funds for the uprising. After its defeat, he left political life again, eventually moving to the Prussian partition. He died in October 1800 in Krasne.

== Legacy ==
He was also known for his support of religious tolerance.

He has been a controversial figure for historians: unyielding supporter of Golden Liberty in the age where it was impossible to uphold this principle; supporter of the conservative and treacherous hetman's faction in the early 1760s, two decades later, leader of the Bar Confederation - seen the first of Poland's national uprisings - and finally one of the supporters of the May's Constitution.
