= Svitene Manor =

Manor house in Latvia

- Svitenes muiža
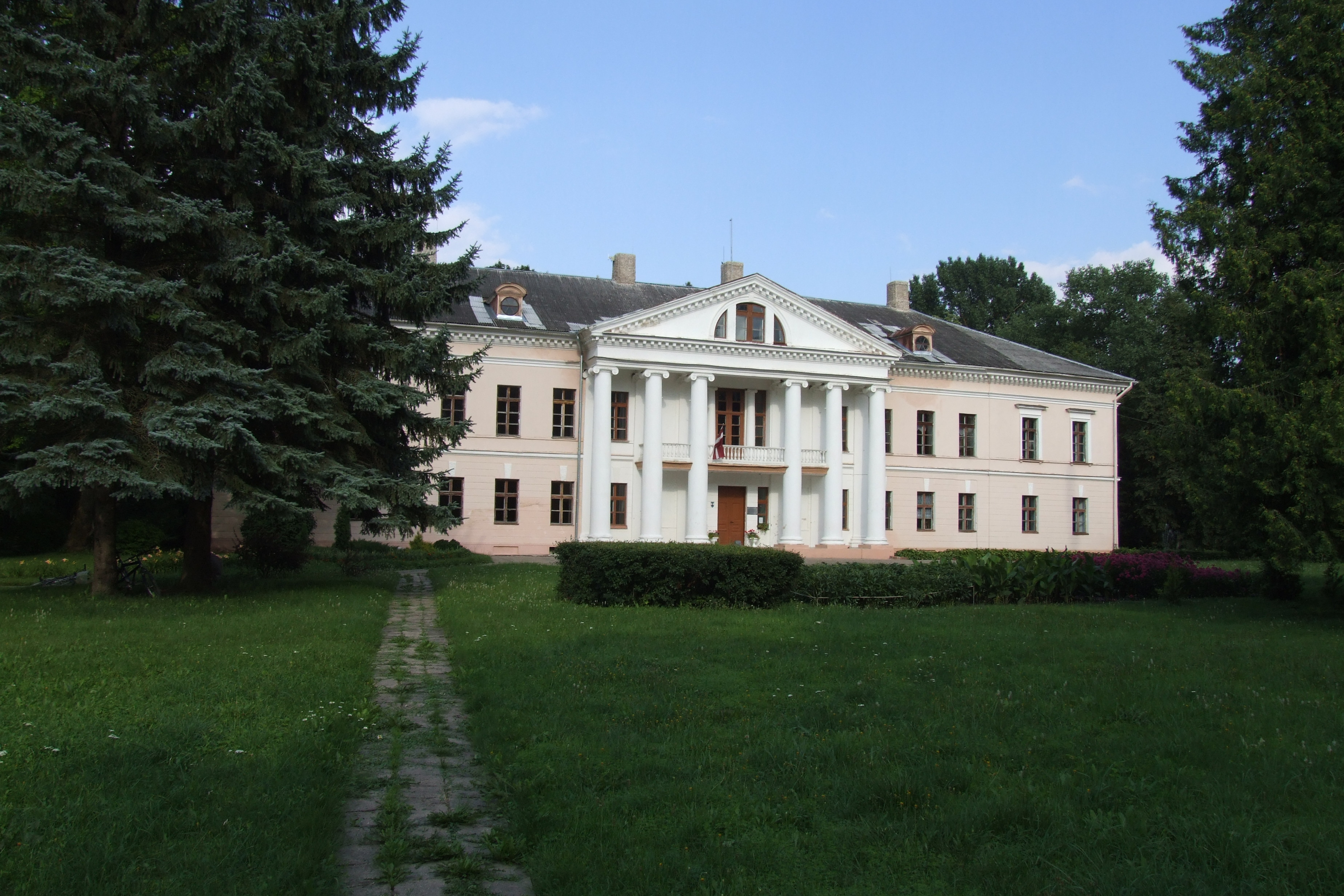

- Location within Latvia

General information
- Architectural style: Classicism
- Location: Svitene, Svitene Parish, Bauska Municipality, Latvia
- Coordinates: 56.3781°N 23.9311°E
- Completed: Around 1800
- Client: Johann Martin von Elmpt

Svitene Manor (Latvian: Svitenes muižas pils; German: Schloß Schwitten) is a manor house in the Svitene Parish of Bauska Municipality in the Semigallia region of Latvia. The building currently houses the Svitene music and art school.

== History ==
Svitene manor was originally a monastery, built in the 15th century in 1451–1454. Svitene manor was established in 15th century when it was owned by von Grotthuß family. In 1736 estate was bought by Ernst Johann Biron. In 1788 manor became property of fieldmarshall Count Johann Martin von Elmpt. Construction of the current building began around 1800 however Johan Martin von Elmpt died in the 1802 and construction works was finished by his son Philip von Elmpt. Elmpt family were great art lovers. During their time there were many valuable paintings in the castle. In 1893 manor was bought by Anatoly Lieven.

During Latvian War of Independence in autumn 1919 manor building was partly burned by retreating troops of West Russian Volunteer Army. After Latvian agrarian reforms of the 1920s Svitene manor was nationalized and lands partitioned for 86 new farms. Since 1921 primary school and library was located in the manor building. Building was reconstructed in 1938 and 1970. In 2013 primary school was moved to another building but part of the manor house is still occupied by local Art and Music school.

== See also ==
- List of palaces and manor houses in Latvia
