= Helga Adler =

German politician and historian

Helga Adler (born Helga Obuchoff: 21 December 1943) spent the earlier part of her career as an East German historian and, latterly, politician. She was politically engaged during the build up to German reunification, but in November 1991 resigned, sidelined and disillusioned, from what had by then become the Party of Democratic Socialism, Since then she been formally unaffiliated politically, but very far from uninterested.

She has been a committed feminist through most of her career, and was the director of the Paula Panke Women's Centre ("Frauenzentrum Paula Panke e.V.") in Berlin-Pankow between 1998 and 2009.

== Life ==
Helga Obuchoff was born in Praschnitz a mid-sized town in the Zichenau region of what had become East Prussia following the frontier changes agreed and implemented by the governments of Germany and the Soviet Union four years earlier, in 1939. Her father had volunteered for army service in 1939, and was promoted by the end of the war to the rank of a junior officer. After the ethnic cleansing of 1944/45 the Obuchoffs and their three children ended up living with relatives in the Harz region, before moving on and settling in Genthin, a small industrial town near Magdeburg, where Helga Obuchoff grew up. The entire central portion of what had been Germany was administered as the Soviet occupation zone after 1945, and her father engaged in the politics of the time and place, becoming by 1956 the first secretary in the Genthin district of the Socialist Unity Party ("Sozialistische Einheitspartei Deutschlands" / SED), created in 1946 and, after October 1949, the ruling party in a new kind of German one-party dictatorship. As a young mother in a war-ravaged country with a desperate shortage of working age males, Obuchoff's mother was able to benefit from education and other practical career support that would not have been available to German women of earlier generations, and later became the Operations Manager at Genthin's large sugar refinery.

By the time she was old enough to attend secondary school, the education system had been reconfigured. Between 1950 and 1958 Obuchoff attended the Polytechnic Secondary School (Polytechnische Oberschule / POS) in Wernigerode and then, when the family relocated, moved on to the POS in Genthin. Between 1958 and 1962 she attended Genthin's well respected Extended Secondary School ("Erweiterte allgemeinbildende polytechnische Oberschule" / EOS) which was where, in 1962, she passed her School Final Exams (Abitur), opening the way to university level education. However, her immediate next step, in 1962/63, was a training in Magdeburg as a draftswoman for the construction sector.

It was only to be expected that, as the daughter of a dedicated party official, Helga Obuchoff had been a member of the party's youth wing, the Free German Youth ("Freie Deutsche Jugend" / FDJ) since 1958: in 1963 she became one of the by now one and a half million members of the country's ruling SED (party). In 1963 she enrolled at Berlin's Humboldt University where she studied History and Art history, concluding her undergraduate studies in 1968 with a history degree. After this she worked between 1968 and 1974 as a researcher at the Party Central Committee's Academy for Social Sciences in Berlin, holding a teaching chair in history. From 1974 to 1975, and again between 1978 and 1990, she held a post as a researcher at the International Politics and Economics Institute ("Institut für Internationale Politik und Wirtschaft" / IPW) in East Berlin. Between 1975 and 1978 she combined her roles in Berlin with her work as a researcher at the International Peace Institute ("Internationales Institut für Frieden") in Vienna, where the focus of her work was on the peace movement. However, in 1979 it was from the IPW in Berlin that she received her doctorate for work on socialist and democratic movements and the peace movement in Western Europe and the USA ("...soziale und demokratische Bewegungen sowie über die Friedensbewegung in Westeuropa und den USA "), subjects on which as an established researcher at the Institute she was also able to act as an advisor to the political establishment. She was also able to apply herself to contemporary social movements in her study of the German Federal Republic (West Germany), such as the "new political platforms in the struggle against nuclear power" among which she identified students, women, gays and lesbians.

1989 was a year of increasing street protests in East Germany, mirrored by a loss of self-confidence within the party leadership which reflected uncertainty over the extent to which any traditional hard-line government response to the protestors would be supported by Mikhail Gorbachev, whose advocacy of greater openness had actually encouraged political discussion in East Germany. Underlying the political tensions was the financial bankruptcy of the state which was forcing the government to solicit additional funding from West Germany. In June 1989 Adler was a member of an East German delegation headed up by Egon Krenz for an exploratory meeting with Oskar Lafontaine.

The meeting was important because Krenz and LaFontaine were seen as potential future leaders of their countries at a time when Erich Honecker was well past retirement age and Helmut Kohl had already been in power for eight years. LaFontaine occupied a position on the political left within (for most of the time) the West German political establishment, while there were hopes that Krenz might be more open to new ideas than the existing East German gerontocracy. At a time when few dared (or, from the position of the East Germany political establishment, wished) to contemplate reunification, good personal relations between LaFontaine and Krenz nevertheless offered the prospect of closer future relations between East and West Germany. Adler later recalled their meeting, at which LaFontaine had politely but firmly criticised the recent so-called Tiananmen Square Massacre and condemned the falsification of election results in East Germany. Krenz initially responded expansively and positively, but then appeared to withdraw his earlier comments after receiving fresh instructions from the leadership in Berlin.

The breach of the Berlin Wall in November 1989 and the subsequent realisation that Soviet troops in East Germany had no orders to intervene in order to suppress popular dissent, appeared to rule out a rerun in Berlin of the 1968 Prague Spring or of East Germany's own sad experiences back in 1953. This triggered a series of events which presaged political change and which, as matters turned out, culminated in German reunification, formally in October 1990. There were those who thought the survival of East Germany's ruling SED (party) in doubt. At the end of 1989 Helga Adler was one of those who took a lead in insisting that the old party could and must be reformed in order to preserve socialist values through an uncertain future, as part of which she took a lead in establishing what one source defines as the "Initiative Movement" ("Initiativbewegung") which was part of the process leading to the emergence of the Party of Democratic Socialism (PDS), which as the discredited authoritarianism of the German Democratic Republic crumbled, could evolve into something better able to operate under democratic structures.

Between March 1990 and November 1991 Helga Adler served as a member of the PDS party executive ("Parteivorstand"). Within the leadership team, reflecting her years of academic research, she headed up the Commission on Foreign Policy, Pressure Groups and Labour Associations. In February and March 1991 Helga Adler also served as spokesperson for the party executive. Nevertheless, in November 1991 she resigned from all her party offices, also resigning her party membership. She complained of a monolithic approach by the new party leadership under Gregor Gysi, that left insufficient room for discussion, even though he was keen, for external consumption, to present the party as something colourful, diverse, feminine, punky and youthful ("... als etwas Buntes, Vielfältiges, Weibliches, Punkiges, Junges"). Several of the party's "more progressive" comrades resigned at the same time, apparently for broadly the same reasons.

From December 1991 till the start of 1993 Adler worked as a researcher in "Netzwerk Wissenschaft" in Berlin. Between 1992 and 1999 she was a member of the executive board with the Marburg based Association of Democratic Scientists and Scholars ("Bund demokratischer Wissenschaftlerinnen und Wissenschaftler"), a left-leaning think tank / pressure group. In 1997 she accepted the directorship of the Paula Panke Women's Centre ("Frauenzentrum Paula Panke e.V.") in Berlin-Pankow, running the centre with energy and commitment till 2008 or 2009. She also, in 1999, became spokeswoman for the "Berlin Women's Network" ("Berliner FrauenNetzwerk").

Since 2011 Adler has represented The Left (party) in the Berlin-Pankow local council, although formally she remains unaffiliated politically.
