= Battle of Przasnysz =

- Part of Polish–Soviet War
Date	21st August 1920
Location	Przasnysz
Result	Polish victory

Belligerents
Second Polish Republic	Russian SFSR

Commanders and leaders
Władysław Sikorski; Aleksander Osiński; Franciszek Krajowski	Mikhail Tukhachevsky

The Battle of Przasnysz took place on 21 August 1920 near the towns of Przasnysz and Ciechanow, during the Polish-Soviet War. Polish forces of Lida Rifle Regiment and 202. Infantry Regiment clashed with elements of Red Army's 16th and 23rd Infantry Divisions.

After the victorious battle of the Wkra river, units of Polish 5th Army (General Wladyslaw Sikorski), began their assault towards Przasnysz and Mlawa (18 August). Soviet 4th Army, which at that time occupied positions along the lower Vistula river, found itself in a difficult situation. As a result, on 20 August General Mikhail Tukhachevsky ordered his troops to concentrate in the area Ciechanow - Przasnysz - Makow Mazowiecki. The town of Przasnysz was of strategic importance to the Soviets, as the control of it enabled them to withdraw their forces eastwards, to Myszyniec and Kolno.

On 19 August General Sikorski ordered General Aleksander Osinski, who commanded 17th Infantry Division, to capture Przasnysz and Mlawa and cut off Soviet evacuation routes between Przasnysz and nearby border with East Prussia. Polish forces attacked Soviet 33rd Rifle Division, and captured Grudusk. At the same time, Volunteer Division under Adam Koc seized Przasnysz, but was soon afterwards forced to abandon the town by superior Red Army elements.

In the evening of 20 August Lida Infantry Regiment (later known as 76th Infantry Regiment), which stayed in reserve, was ordered to capture Przasnysz. In the morning of 21 August the regiment attacked, together with 202nd Infantry Regiment. Despite stiff Soviet resistance, by the evening of the same day the town was in Polish hands. Its capture complicated the position of Soviet 4th Army.

The Battle of Przasnysz is commemorated on the Tomb of the Unknown Soldier, Warsaw, with the inscription "PRZASNYSZ 21 - 22 VIII 1920".

== Sources ==
- J. Odziemkowski, Leksykon wojny polsko-rosyjskiej 1919 - 1920, wyd. RYTM Warszawa 2004.
