= Michał Hieronim Krasiński =

Polish noble (1712–1784)

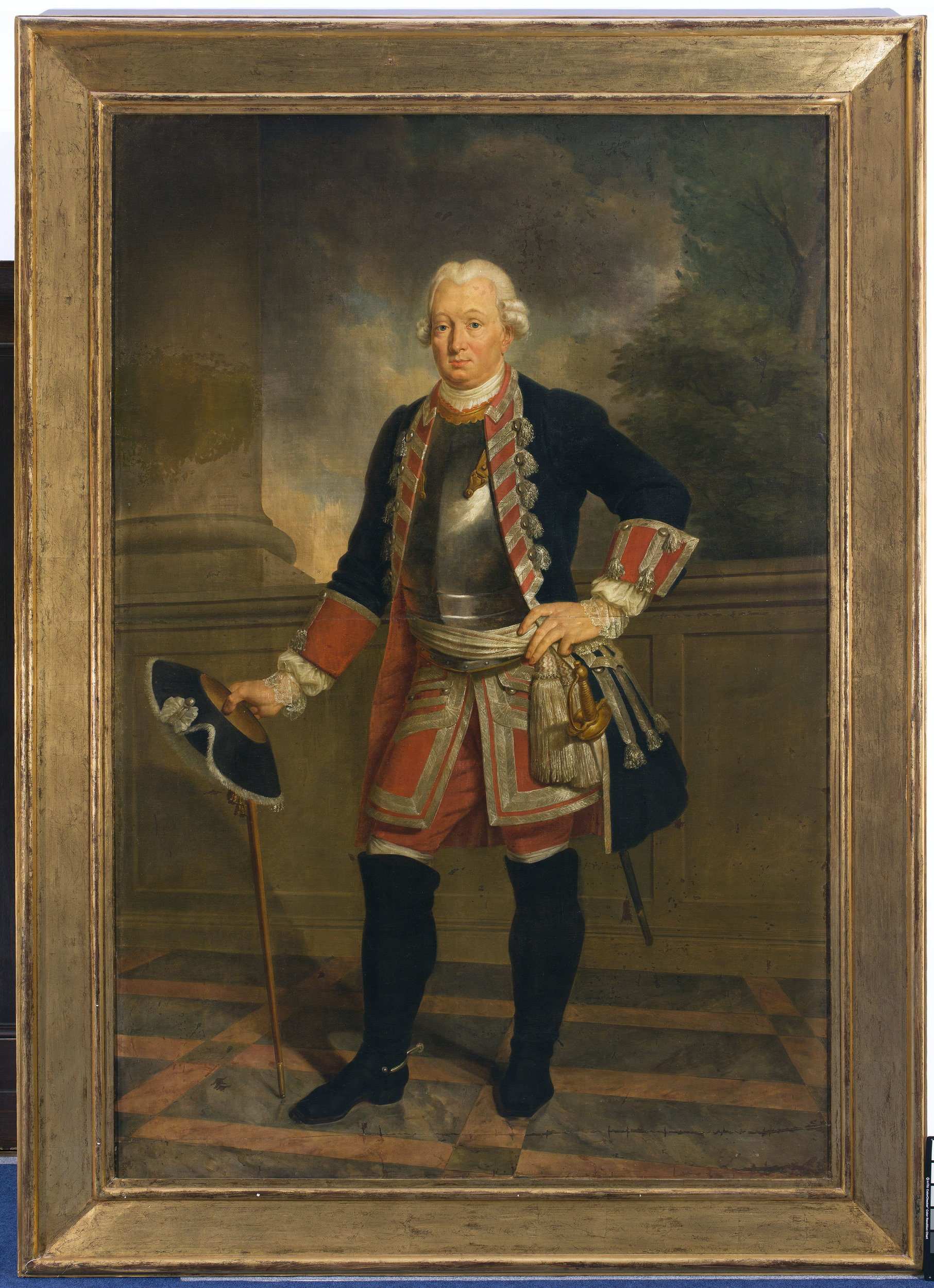
Portrait of Michał Krasiński (1712–1784), marshal general of Bar Confederation

Michał Hieronim Krasiński (1712 – May 25, 1784) was a Polish noble known for being one of the leaders of Bar Confederation (1768–1772). He was cupbearer of Stężyca, podkomorzy of Różan, starosta of Opiniogóra, and envoy to many Sejms.

He was a captain in August III army. He was a member of parliament in 1748 and 1750 as a deputate from Sandomierz voivodeship and in 1756, 1758 and 1760.

He was the brother of Adam Stanisław Krasiński, the father of Jan Krasiński and Adam Krasiński, and the grandfather of Wincenty Krasiński. He was buried in Krasne.
