= Bar Confederation =

Association of Polish–Lithuanian nobles (1768–1772)

War of the Bar Confederation
- Part of the wars involving Poland–Lithuania
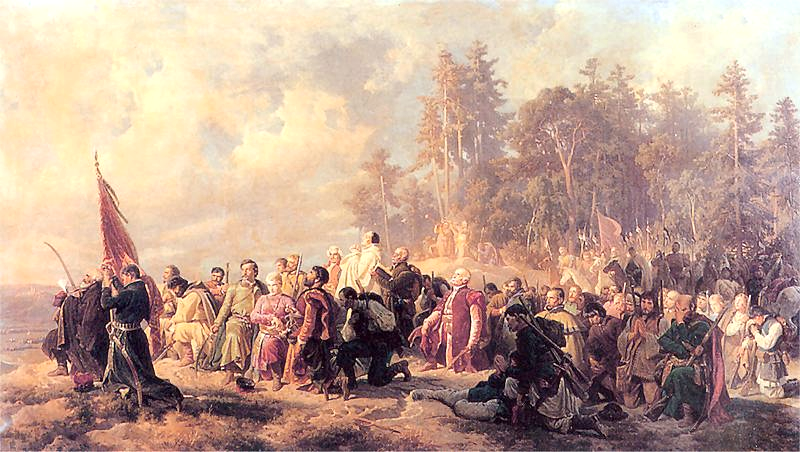
- Bar Confederates pray before the battle of Lanckorona, painting by Artur Grottger (1863)
Date	1768–1772
Location	Polish–Lithuanian Commonwealth
Result	Russian and Stanislaus' victory
Territorial changes	First Partition of Poland

Belligerents
Polish–Lithuanian Commonwealth (royal crown regiments); Russian Empire	(Polish–Lithuanian Commonwealth) Bar Confederation; Allies: Ottoman Empire; Kingdom of France (from 1770)

Commanders and leaders
(Polish–Lithuanian Commonwealth) Stanislaus II Augustus (Polish–Lithuanian Commonwealth) Franciszek Ksawery Branicki (Russian Empire) Ivan Weymarn (Russian Empire) Aleksandr Bibikov (Russian Empire) Alexander Suvorov (Russian Empire) Ivan Karpovich Elmpt	(Polish–Lithuanian Commonwealth) Karol Radziwiłł (Polish–Lithuanian Commonwealth) Casimir Pulaski (Polish–Lithuanian Commonwealth) Michał Jan Pac (Polish–Lithuanian Commonwealth) Count Benyovszky (Kingdom of France) Charles François Dumouriez

Strength
Lanckorona: 3,500 troops	Lanckorona: ~3,500 troops; 2 cannons Total: ~100,000 – 150,000

Casualties and losses
Unknown	Heavy

The Bar Confederation (Polish: Konfederacja barska; 1768–1772) was an association of Polish nobles (szlachta) formed at the fortress of Bar in Podolia (now Ukraine), in 1768 to defend the internal and external independence of the Polish–Lithuanian Commonwealth against Russian political influence and against King Stanislaus II Augustus with Polish reformers, who were attempting to limit the power of the Commonwealth's wealthy magnates.

The founders of the Bar Confederation included the magnates Adam Stanisław Krasiński, the bishop of Kamieniec, Karol Stanisław Radziwiłł, Kazimierz Pułaski, his father and brothers and Michał Hieronim Krasiński. Its creation led to a civil war and contributed to the First Partition of Poland. Maurycy Beniowski was the best known European Bar Confederation volunteer, supported by Roman Catholic France and Austria. Some historians consider the Bar Confederation the first Polish uprising.

== Background ==
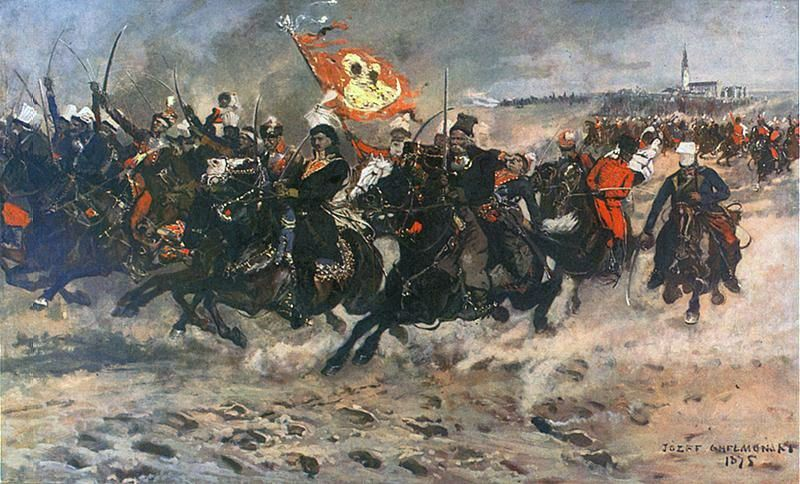
Kazimierz Pułaski at Częstochowa, Painting by Józef Chełmoński, 1875. Oil on canvas. National Museum Warsaw, Poland.

=== Abroad ===
At the end of the Seven Years' War (1756–1763), Russia, first allied with Austria and France, had decided to support Prussia, allowing a victory of the Prussians (allied with Great Britain) over the Austrians (allied with France).

On 11 April 1764, a new treaty was signed between Frederick II of Prussia and Catherine II of Russia, choosing Stanislaus Poniatowski (ex-lover of Catherine II) as the future king of Poland after Augustus III's death (October 1763).

Neither France nor Austria were able to challenge this candidate and Stanislaus was elected in October 1764.

=== In the Commonwealth ===
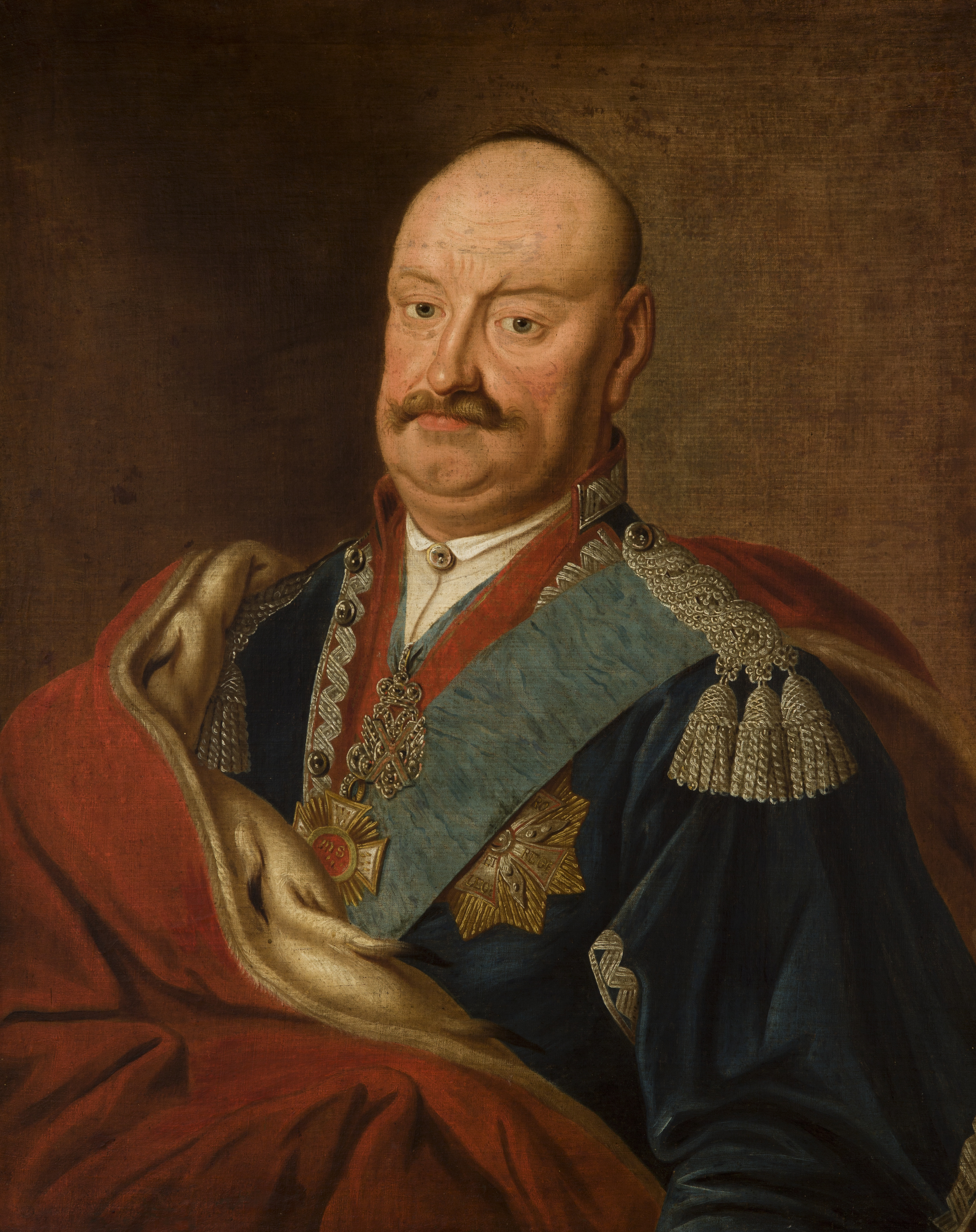
Karol Stanisław Radziwiłł

Following the deposition of the Swedish client king Stanislaus I, early 18th-century Polish–Lithuanian Commonwealth had declined from the status of a major European power to that of a Russian satellite state, with the Russian tsar effectively choosing Polish–Lithuanian monarchs during the "free" elections and deciding the direction of much of Poland–Lithuania's internal politics, for example during the Repnin Sejm (1767–1768), named after the Russian ambassador who unofficially presided over the proceedings.

During this session, the Polish–Lithuanian parliament was forced to pass resolutions demanded by the Russians. Many of the conservative nobility felt anger at that foreign interference, at the perceived weakness of the government under king Stanislaus Augustus, and at the provisions, particularly the ones that empowered non-Catholics, and at other reforms which they saw as threatening the szlachta's Golden Liberty.

The protectorate of Russia over Poland–Lithuania became official with the Traktat wieczystej przyjaźni pomiędzy Rosją a Rzecząpospolitą (lit. 'Treaty of perpetual friendship between Russia and the Commonwealth') which the Repnin Sejm accepted without debate on 27 February 1768.

== Creation of the Bar Confederation (29 February 1768) ==
In response to that, and particularly after Russian troops arrested and exiled several vocal opponents (namely bishop of Kiev Józef Andrzej Załuski, bishop of Cracow Kajetan Sołtyk, and Field Crown Hetman Wacław Rzewuski with his son Seweryn), a group of Polish magnates decided to form a confederatio – a military association opposing the government in accordance with Polish constitutional traditions. The articles of the confederation were signed on 29 February 1768 at the fortress of Bar in Podolia.

The instigators of the confederation included Adam Krasiński, Bishop of Kamieniec, his brother Michał Hieronim Krasiński, Casimir Pulaski, Kajetan Sołtyk, Wacław Rzewuski, Michał Jan Pac, Jozef Miaczinsky, Jerzy August Mniszech, Joachim Potocki and Teodor Wessel. Father Jandołowicz was a notable religious leader, and Michał Wielhorski the Confederation's political ideologue.

== Civil war and foreign interventions ==
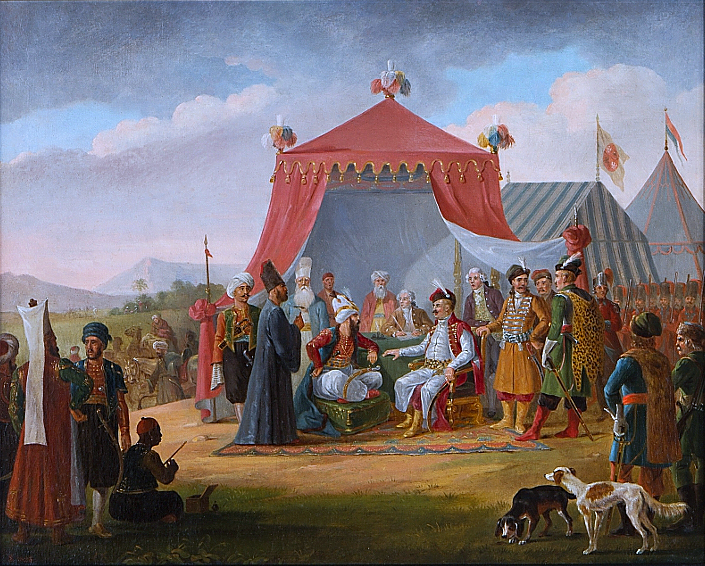
Marshal of the Bar Confederation Michał Krasiński receives an Ottoman dignitary.

=== 1768 ===
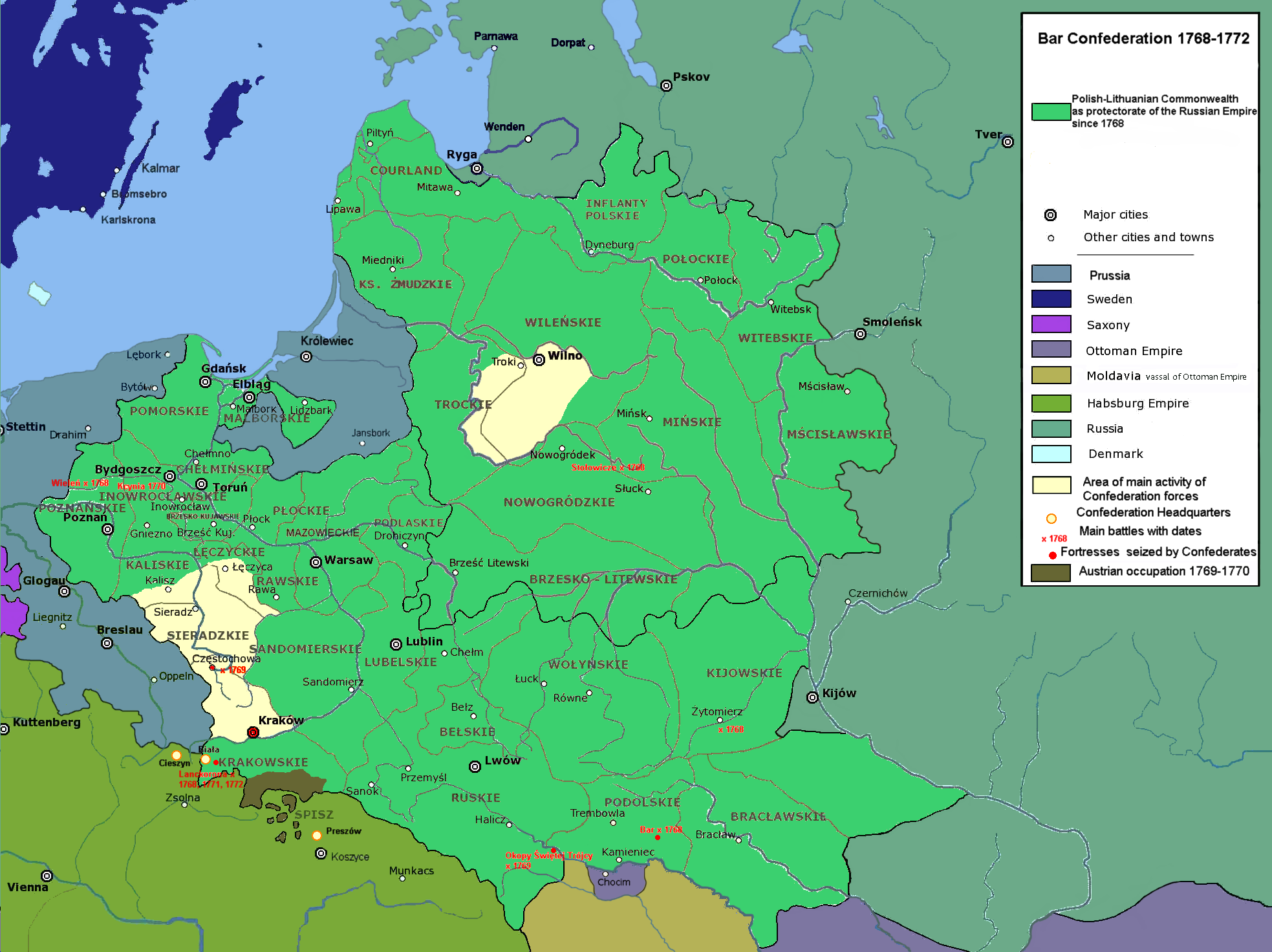
A map of the Bar Confederation 1768–72

The confederation, encouraged and aided by Roman Catholic France and Austria, declared war on Russia. Its irregular forces, formed from volunteers, magnate militias and deserters from the royal army, soon clashed with the Russian troops and units loyal to the Polish crown. Confederation forces under Michał Jan Pac and Prince Karol Stanisław Radziwiłł roamed the land in every direction, won several engagements with the Russians, and at last, utterly ignoring the King, sent envoys on their own account to the principal European powers, i.e. Ottoman Empire, the major ally of Bar confederation, France and Austria.

King Stanislaus Augustus was at first inclined to mediate between the Confederates and Russia, the latter represented by the Russian envoy to Warsaw, Prince Nikolai Repnin; but finding this impossible, he sent a force against them under Grand Hetman Franciszek Ksawery Branicki and two generals against the confederates. This marked the Ukrainian campaign, which lasted from April till June 1768, and was ended with the capture of Bar on 20 June. Confederation forces retreated to Moldavia. There was also a pro-Confederation force in Lesser Poland, that operated from June till August, that ended with the royal forces securing Kraków on 22 August, followed by a period of conflict in Belarus (August–October), that ended with the surrender of Nesvizh on 26 October.

The simultaneous outbreak of the Koliivshchyna in Ukraine (May 1768 – June 1769) made major confederation forces retreat to Ottoman Empire beforehand and kept the Confederation alive.

The Confederates appealed for help from abroad and contributed to bringing about war between Russia and the Ottoman Empire (the Russo-Turkish War (1768–1774) that began in September).

=== 1769–1770 ===
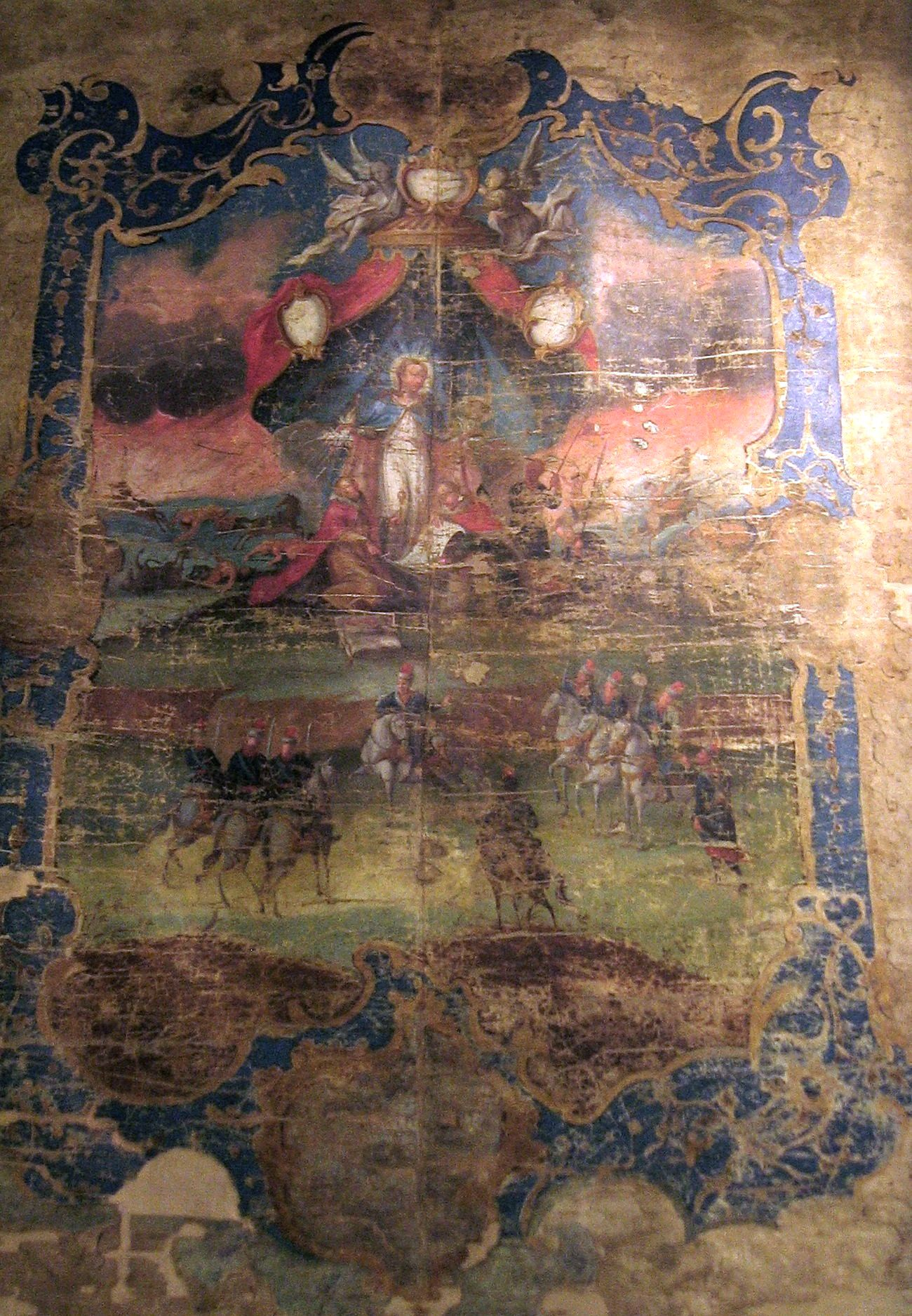
The standard of the Bar confederates on wall paper

The retreat of some Russian forces needed on the Ottoman front bolstered the confederates, who reappeared in force in Lesser and Greater Polands by 1769. In 1770 the Council of Bar Confederation transferred from its original seat in Austrian part of Silesia to Hungary, whence it conducted diplomatic negotiations with France, Austria and Turkey with a view to forming a stable league against Russia. The council proclaimed the king dethroned on 22 October 1770. The court of Versailles sent Charles François Dumouriez to act as an aid to the Confederates, and he helped them organise their forces. He fortified several fortresses around Kraków (Tyniec, Lanckorona, Częstochowa) and formed a Confederate infantry detachment to protect the warehouses in Podolia.

The Confederates began operating in Lithuania, although after early successes that direction too met with failures, with defeats at Białystok on 16 July and Orzechowo on 13 September 1769. Early 1770 saw the defeats of confederates in Greater Poland, after the battle of Dobra (20 January) and Błonie (12 February), which forced them into a mostly defensive, passive stance.

Remnants of the Bar Fortress (now in Ukraine), designed by Guillaume Levasseur de Beauplan
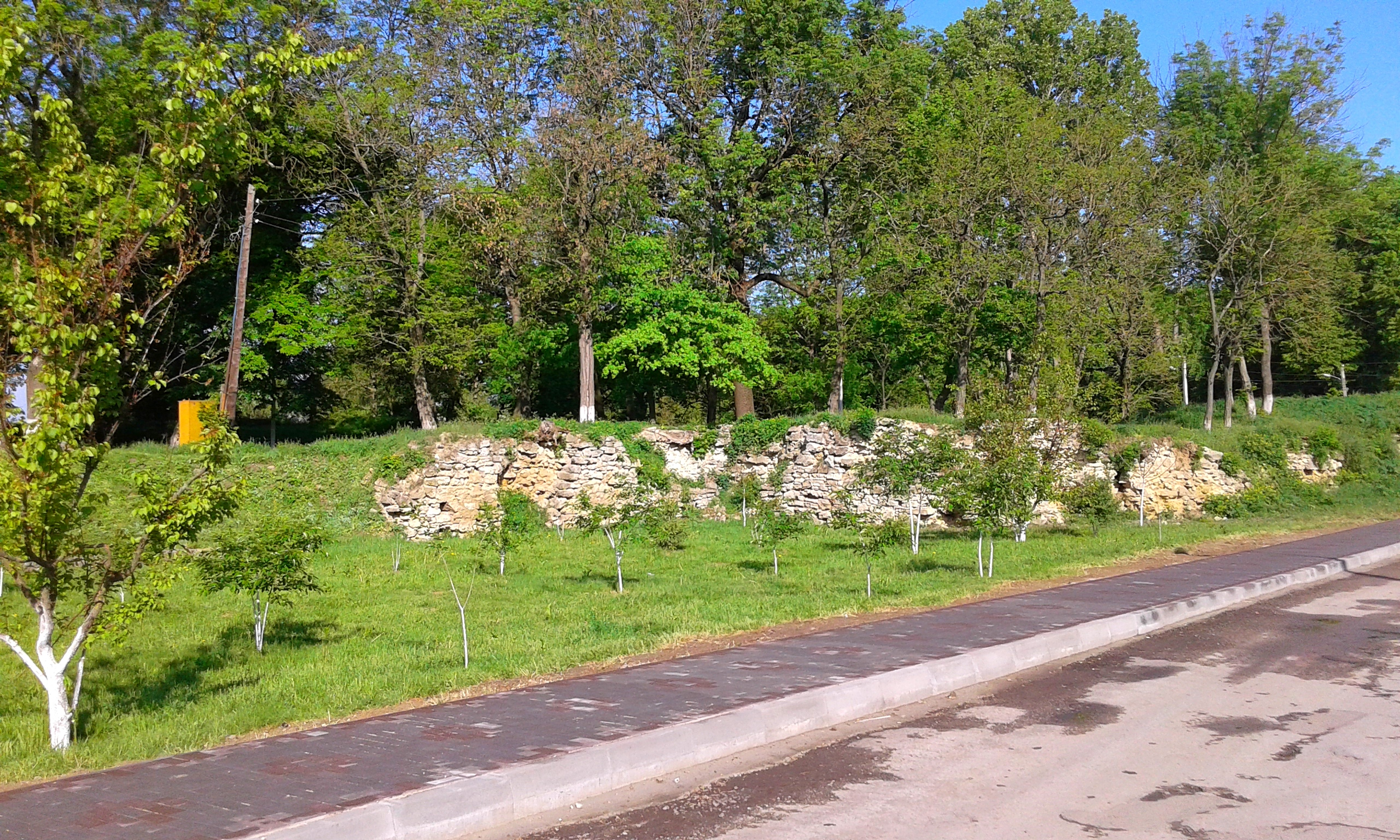
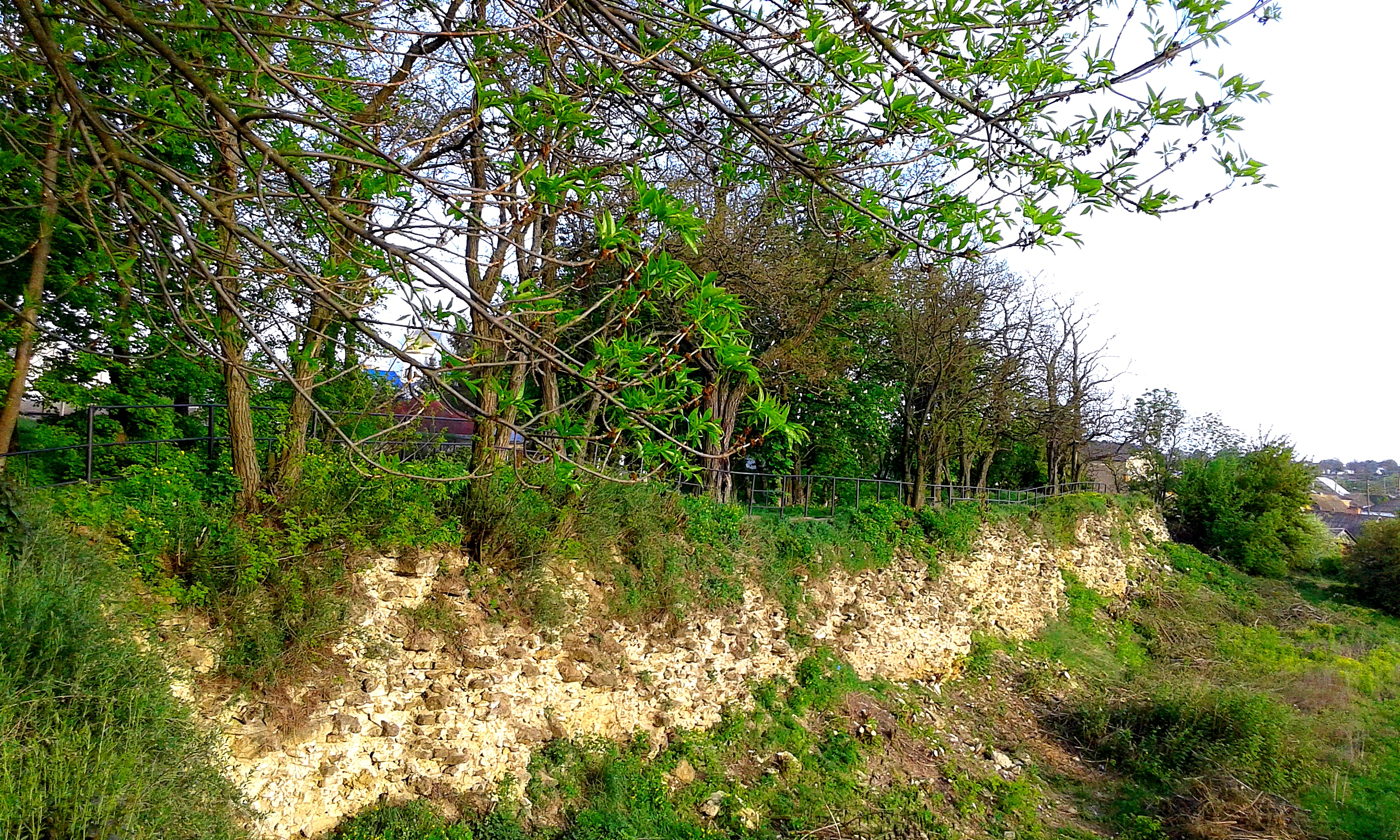

An attempt of Bar Confederates (including Casimir Pulaski) to kidnap king Stanislaus II Augustus on 3 November 1771 led the Habsburgs to withdraw their support from the confederates, expelling them from their territories. It also gave the three courts another pretext to showcase the "Polish anarchy" and the need for its neighbours to step in and "save" the country and its citizens. The king thereupon reverted to the Russian faction, and for the attempt of kidnapping their king, the Confederation lost much of the support it had in Europe.

=== 1771–1772 ===
Its army, thoroughly reorganized by Dumouriez, maintained the fight. The year 1771 brought further defeats, including the one at Lanckorona on 21 May and at Stałowicze at 23 October. The final battle of the war was the siege of Jasna Góra, which fell on 13 August 1772. The regiments of the Bar Confederation, whose executive board had been forced to leave Austria, which previously supported them, after Austria joined the Prusso-Russian alliance, did not lay down their arms.

Many fortresses in their command held out as long as possible; Wawel Castle (defended by Marquis de Choisy) in Kraków fell only on 28 April; Tyniec fortress held until 13 July 1772; Częstochowa, commanded by Kazimierz Pułaski, held until 18 August. Overall, around 100,000 nobles participated in 500 military clashes in 1768–1772. Perhaps the last stronghold of the confederates was in the monastery in Zagórz, which fell only on 28 November 1772. In the end, the Bar Confederation was defeated, with its members either fleeing abroad or being deported to Siberia, Volga region, Urals by the Russians.

In the meantime, taking advantage of the confusion in the Commonwealth, already by 1769–71, both Austria and Prussia had taken over some of its border territories, with Austria taking Szepes County in 1769–1770 and Prussia incorporating Lauenburg and Bütow. On 19 February 1772, the agreement of partition was signed in Vienna. A previous secret agreement between Prussia and Russia had been made in Saint Petersburg on 6 February 1772.

Early in August, Russian, Prussian, and Austrian troops fighting the Bar confederation in the Commonwealth occupied the provinces agreed upon among themselves. On 5 August, the three parties issued a manifesto about their respective territorial gains on the Commonwealth's expense.

Bar Confederates taken as prisoners by the Russians, together with their families, formed the first major group of Poles and Lithuanians exiled to Siberia (sybirak). It is estimated that about 5,000 former confederates were sent there. Russia organized 3 concentration camps in Polish–Lithuanian Commonwealth for Polish captives, where these concentrated persons have been waiting for their deportation there.

=== International situation after the defeat of Bar confederation and its Ottoman allies ===
Around mid-18th century the European balance of power shifted, with Russian victories against the Ottomans in the Russo-Turkish War (1768–1774) strengthening Russia and endangering Habsburg interests in that region (particularly in Moldavia and Wallachia). At that point Habsburg Austria started to consider waging a war against Russia. France, friendly towards both Prussia and Austria, suggested a series of territorial adjustments, in which Austria would be compensated by parts of Prussian Silesia, and Prussia in turn would receive Polish Ermland (Warmia) and parts of the Polish fief, Duchy of Courland and Semigallia – already under Baltic German hegemony.

King Frederick II of Prussia had no intention of giving up Silesia gained recently in the Silesian Wars. He was interested in finding a peaceful solution – his alliance with Russia would draw him into a potential war with Austria, and the Seven Years' War had left Austria's treasury and army weakened. He was also interested in protecting the weakening Ottoman Empire, which could be advantageously utilized in the event of a Prussian war either with Russia or Austria. Frederick's brother, Prince Henry, spent the winter of 1770–71 as a representative of the Prussian court at Saint Petersburg.

As Austria had annexed 13 towns in the Hungarian Szepes county in 1769, violating the Treaty of Lubowla, Catherine II of Russia and her advisor General Ivan Chernyshyov suggested to Henry that Prussia claim some Polish land, such as Ermland. After Henry informed him of the proposal, Frederick suggested a partition of the Polish borderlands by Austria, Prussia, and Russia, with the largest share going to Austria. Thus Frederick attempted to encourage Russia to direct its expansion towards weak and non-functional Polish–Lithuanian Commonwealth instead of the Ottomans.

Russia considered the weak Poland–Lithuania as its protectorate for a few decades already since the Silent Sejm. Poland–Lithuania was devastated by a civil war in which the Bar Confederation's forces attempted to disrupt Russian control. The recent Koliivshchyna peasant and Cossack uprising in Ukraine also weakened Polish–Lithuanian position. Further, the Russian-supported king of Poland, Stanislaus Augustus, was seen as both weak and too independent-minded. Eventually the Russian court decided that Poland–Lithuania's usefulness as a protectorate had lessened. The three powers officially justified their actions as compensation for dealing with troublesome neighbor and restoring order to Polish anarchy, for which the Bar Confederation provided a convenient excuse. All three were interested in territorial gains.

After Russia occupied the Danubian Principalities, Henry convinced Frederick and Archduchess Maria Theresa of Austria that the balance of power would be maintained by a tripartite division of the Polish–Lithuanian Commonwealth instead of Russia taking land from the Ottomans. Under pressure from Prussia, which for a long time wanted to annex the northern Polish province of Royal Prussia, the three powers agreed on the First Partition of Poland–Lithuania. This was in light of the possible Austrian-Ottoman-Bar confederation alliance with only token objections from Austria, which would have instead preferred to receive more Ottoman territories in the Balkans, a region which for a long time had been coveted by the Habsburgs, including Bukovina. The Russians also withdrew from Moldavia and Wallachia away from the Austrian border.

== Legacy ==
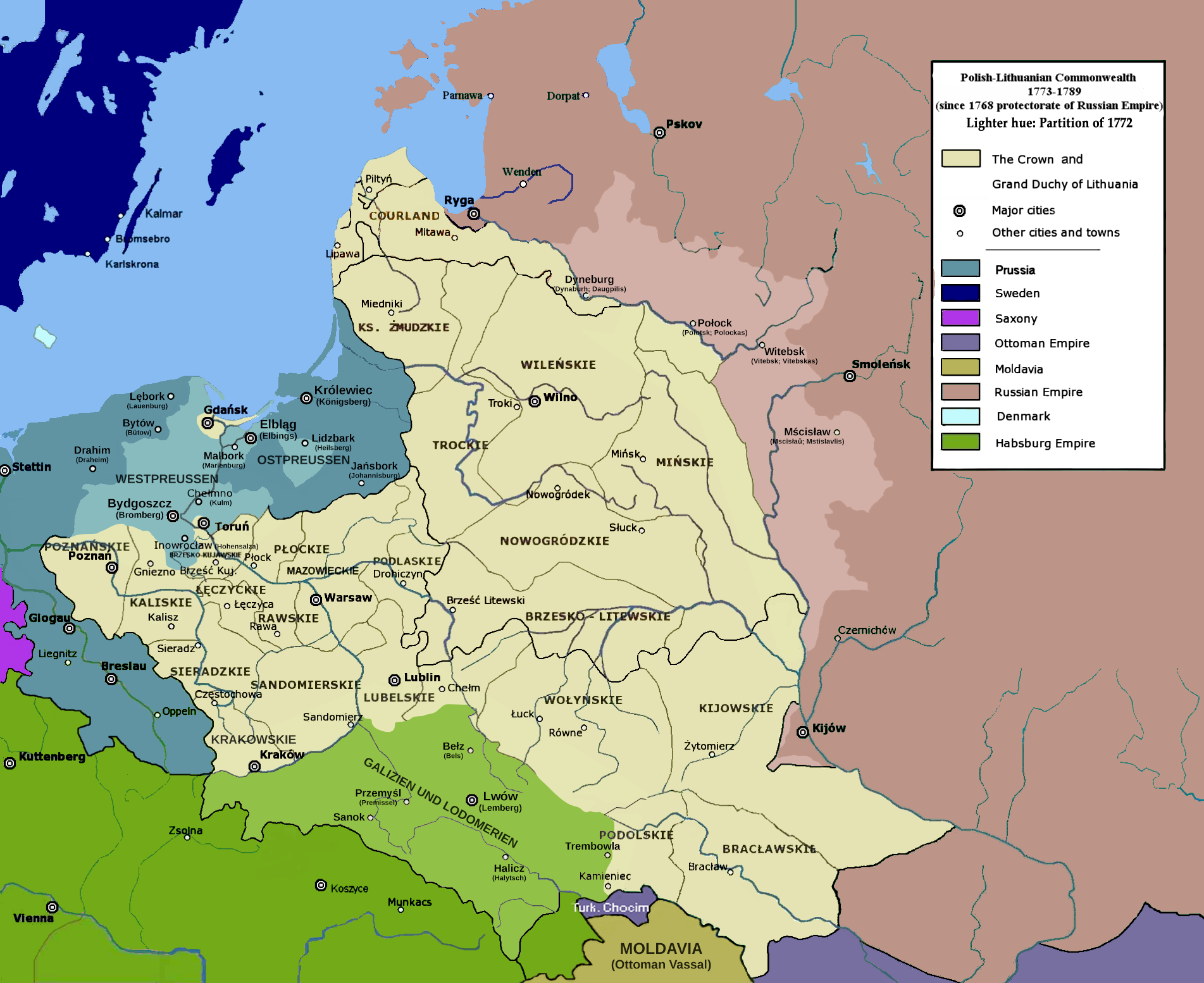
The Polish–Lithuanian Commonwealth after the First Partition of Poland (1773–1789)

Until the times of the Bar Confederation, confederates – especially operating with the aid of outside forces – were seen as unpatriotic antagonists. But in 1770s, during the times that the Imperial Russian Army marched through the theoretically independent Commonwealth, and foreign powers forced the Sejm to agree to the First Partition of Poland–Lithuania, the confederates started to create an image of Polish exiled soldiers, the last of those who remained true to their Motherland, an image that would in the next two centuries lead to the creation of Polish Legions and other forces in exile.

In 1777, Casimir Pulaski was recruited by Claude-Carloman de Rulhière, Marquis de Lafayette, and Benjamin Franklin for service in the American Revolutionary War.

The Confederation has generated varying assessments from the historians. All admit its patriotic desire to free the Commonwealth from outside (primarily-Russian) influence. Some, such as Jacek Jędruch, criticise its regressive stance on civil rights issues, primarily with regards to religious tolerance (Jędruch writes of "religious bigotry" and a "narrowly Catholic" stance), and assert that to have contributed to the First Partition. Others, such as Bohdan Urbankowski, applaud it as the first serious national military effort to restore Polish independence.

The Bar Confederation has been described as the first Polish uprising and the last mass movement of szlachta. It is also commemorated on the Tomb of the Unknown Soldier, Warsaw, with the inscription "Konfederacja barska 29 II 1768 – 18 VII 1772".

== List of battles ==
- Battle of Orzechowo
- Battle of Dęborzyn
- Action of Tyniec Abbey
- Battles of Lanckorona
- Siege of Giurgiu
- Battle of Stołowicze
- Siege of Kraków Castle

== See also ==
- Aleksandr Bibikov
- Anna Jabłonowska
- Józef Sawa-Caliński
- Jozef Miaczinsky
- Koliyivshchyna
