= Marquis de Choisy =

French general (1723–1800)

- Born: 27 January 1723; Moulins, Kingdom of France
- Died: 1800 (aged 76–77) Montfermeil
- Allegiance: Kingdom of France
- Branch: French Army
- Service years: 1741–1793
- Rank: Lieutenant General
- Commands: Lauzun's Legion; Virginia militia; Armee du Nord
- Conflicts: War of the Bar Confederation; Siege of Kraków Castle; American Revolutionary War; Siege of Yorktown

Claude Gabriel, Marquis de Choissey (French: Claude Gabriel de Choisy; 1723–1800) was a French general who served in Poland in the 1770s, and then in North America during the American Revolutionary War.

De Choissey was at the siege of Yorktown in command of Lauzun's Legion and General George Weedon's Virginia militia, and at Gloucester, Virginia, under the command of Rochambeau, opposite Banastre Tarleton. Awarded the Libertas Americana medal for his service, he returned to France in 1783 and retired from active duty in 1793.

== Capture of Cracow ==
France was allied with Poland against Russia, in the Bar Confederation. On 2 February 1772, he led 270 men, in the capture of Kraków Poland, from 1,500 Russians. A small party entered through a sewer, surprised the guard, and opened the postern gate. Not being reinforced in time, they retreated to the citadel, Wawel Castle. They held it through a siege of several weeks against 3,246 Russians (under Suvorov's command; and 18,000 in all), until it fell to Suvorov on 28 April 1772.

On 24 March 1772, he was appointed Brigadier General of Infantry, and in 1779 appointed to be Mestre of the Camp for the Fourth Regiment Chasseurs a Cheval.

== Joining the Expédition Particulière ==
Competition was fierce among French officers to join the expedition to America, to gain fame and promotion. Marquis de Choisy arrived at Brest with five others officers to join the Army, but was turned away. Then he sailed, with ten officers, on the Sybille for Santo Domingo, changing ships to La Gentille, arriving at Newport on 29 September 1780.

Tensions ran high among officers in camp; he sought to reconcile officers who had fought a duel.

On 29 October, Rochambeau sent Brigadier General Choisy with Lauzun's Legion, as they marched from Rhode Island to Head of Elk, Maryland, traveled by water to Alexandria, Virginia, and marched to Gloucester Courthouse.

== Battle of Gloucester, Virginia ==
Gloucester point was an obvious escape route from Yorktown. Marquis de Choisy was assigned the Virginia militia, Lauzun's Legion, and 800 French Marines. Opposite them was Tarleton's Legion, Simcoe's Rangers, the 80th Foot regiment, and the Erb Prinz (Prince Hereditaire) regiment.

On 4 October 1781, Marquis de Choisy was marching towards Gloucester by the Severn road (Route 17), while John Mercer, with the Virginia militia, "veterans", took the York River road. Tarleton, who had crossed the river the night before, led a covering force for a "grand forage", for supplies.

Lauzun and Tarleton charged and countercharged over the open ground. Tarleton was unhorsed, and Lauzun's Legion skirmished allowing the infantry to fire upon the British. Tarleton withdrew within his lines, and the French pursued, before being ordered to withdraw by the Marquis de Choisy. This clash between Tarleton and Lauzun marks the largest Cavalry engagement in the American Revolution. The British lost killed or wounded one officer and eleven men; the French lost two officers and fourteen hussars.

Marquis de Choisy wrote Washington:

Sir, I have the hounor to inform you that by our arrival at Saoul's Tavern we have met with the ennemi who was in number about 500 men Cavalry and Infantry, that the Cavalry of the Duc of Lauzun has attaqued them, pierced through and that we have had a great advantage on them We can esteem they have 30 men killed or wounded The 200 men grenadier Americans who were the only Infantry advanced enough to have part in the affair and who have behaved excedingly well have killed one officer who was at the head of the Infantry of the ennemi. T'is a general report that Tarleton has been wounded. The ennemi have retired to Gloucester and we are quickly in our Camp where I expect you will join to morrow as we have already agreed.

I have the hounor to be your Most humble servant,

Choisy

== After the battle ==
Washington corresponded with him about captured horses after the battle.

There was some controversy, about horses and lodging, and returning runaway slaves.

He returned to France with the Comte de Rochambeau, from Annapolis, sailing on January 11, 1783.

He was presented the medal, Libertas Americana, by Benjamin Franklin. He was promoted to Maréchal de Camp (major general) on 5 December 1781, and commander of the Armee du Nord in 1791. He was awarded the Knight Grand Cross of the Order of Saint Louis. He was promoted to be Lieutenant General, 20 May 1791, and honorably retired on 4 February 1793.

=== General of the French Revolution ===
The revolutionary government, which had just published, on 26 October 1791 the decree cementing Avignon and Comtat Venaissin with France, dispatched "civil police chiefs" who were escorted by troops placed under the command of the general Choisy (with the 9th regiment of dragoons). Arriving on the spot, they ordered, after the Massacres of La Glacière, arrests, but on 19 March 1792, a general amnesty was voted by the National Assembly putting a rest to the inquiry.

== See also ==
- Yorktown order of battle
