= Marek Jandołowicz =

Polish Discalced Carmelite and priest

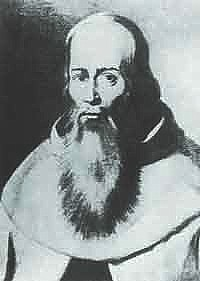
Friar Marek Jandołowicz, OCD

Marek Jandołowicz, OCD (1713–1799), was a Polish Discalced Carmelite friar and priest, who was a patriot in the history of his nation.

One of the founders of the Bar Confederation, Jandołowicz became its spiritual and religious leader. Taken prisoner by the Russian authorities and imprisoned for six years, he took part in the Kościuszko Uprising. He has become an inspiration to poets and writers of the romanticism period, appearing in works of poets such as Seweryn Goszczyński and Juliusz Słowacki.
