= Maciej Rogalski =

Polish footballer

Personal information
- Full name: Maciej Rogalski
- Date of birth: 21 May 1980 (age 46)
- Place of birth: Olsztyn, Poland
- Height: 1.80 m (5 ft 11 in)
- Position: Midfielder

Team information
- Current team: Start Nidzica
- Number: 4

Senior career*
Years	Team	Apps	(Gls)
1998–2005	MKS Mława		
2005–2006	KSZO Ostrowiec	48	(9)
2007–2010	Lechia Gdańsk	86	(18)
2010–2012	Podbeskidzie Bielsko-Biała	48	(3)
2012–2015	Olimpia Grudziądz	80	(15)
2015–2016	Chojniczanka Chojnice	19	(3)
2016–2017	MKS Ciechanów	31	(7)
2017–2023	Mławianka Mława	146	(57)
2024–2026	Olimpia Olsztynek	54	(6)
2026–	Start Nidzica	1	(0)

Managerial career
- 2024–2026: Olimpia Olsztynek (player-manager)
- 2026: MKS Przasnysz
- * Club domestic league appearances and goals as of 17:23, 15 September 2026 (UTC)

Maciej Rogalski (born 21 May 1980) is a Polish professional manager and player who plays as a midfielder for IV liga Warmia-Masuria club Start Nidzica.

== Managerial statistics ==
As of match played 30 August 2026

Managerial record by team and tenure
Team	From	To	Record							
Team	From	To	G	W	D	L	GF	GA	GD	Win %
Olimpia Olsztynek (player-manager)	26 July 2024	17 June 2026	64	22	12	30	114	138	−24	34.38
MKS Przasnysz	17 June 2026	1 September 2026	5	0	0	5	5	10	−5	0.00
Total			69	22	12	35	119	148	−29	31.88

== Honours ==
Lechia Gdańsk

- II liga: 2007–08

Mławianka Mława

- IV liga Masovia: 2020–21, 2021–22 (group I)
