= MKS Przasnysz =

- Full name: Miejski Klub Sportowy w Przasnyszu
- Founded: 1923; 103 years ago (as KS Węgierka)
- Ground: MOSiR Stadium
- Capacity: 5,000
- Chairman: Paweł Woliński
- Manager: Maciej Rogalski
- League: IV liga Masovia
- 2025–26: IV liga Masovia, 14th of 18
- Website: https://mksprzasnysz.pl

MKS Przasnysz is a Polish football club, based in Przasnysz, Masovian Voivodeship. The club's colors are white and blue.

The club currently competes in the IV liga Masovia, after winning the first group of V liga Masovia in 2024.

== History ==
The club was founded in 1923. Its initial name, in place until 1939, was Węgierka, after the local river. In 1945, following World War II, the club was reactivated as Zryw and renamed Związkowiec shortly afterwards. For the 1951-1955 period, the club returned to its original name. In 1955, the name Start was adopted which was changed to LZS Grom in 1964. At that time, a military unit was established in Przasnysz what led to soldiers performing military service in the town playing for the local club. In 1972, the club was renamed to ZWAR (after the factory based in the town called Zakłady Wytwórcze Aparatury Rozdzielczej - the Switchgear Production Facilities). From 1982 to 2000, its name was MZKS. Afterwards, the current name was adopted.

=== League history ===
Following good results in non-league matches in 1948, the club joined the klasa C competitions in 1949. After a series of promotions in the 1960s made possible due to the participation of soldiers in the club's squad, the club reached the liga okręgowa (three levels up from the klasa C at the time).

As ZWAR Przasnysz, the club reaches the III liga in 1979. However, the team finishes last (15th) and was relegated after just one season at the third tier. As MZKS Przasnysz, the club returned to the third level in 1982. The club managed to finish 9th out of 14 in 1982–83, avoiding relegation. The following season, 1983–84, MZKS was ranked 11th out of 14 which wasn't enough to maintain a place at the third tier. Afterwards, the club did not manage to return to the III liga.

In 1999, MKS advanced to the IV liga but the 1999–2000 season ended in defeat, the club finished last being the only team to be relegated that year. Following relegation in 2000, MKS joined the Ciechanów group of the Liga okręgowa (Note: At first, it was the fifth tier of Polish association football. From the 2002–03 season, it was the sixth tier.) where it played until 2007/08. That season, the club won promotion to the Mazovian group of the newly-reformed IV liga, the fifth tier. MKS has been playing there ever since.

=== In the Polish Cup ===
Under the name ZWAR Przasnysz, the club reached the central level of the Polish Cup twice but did not achieve any major success. In the 1978–79 edition, the club was eliminated by Wisła Płock (third division at the time) in the first round. In 1980–81, the Przasnysz team managed to win against the second team of Ursus Warszawa 1–0 in the first round but lost to Bałtyk Gdynia, a top-tier team, in a penalty shootout in the second round.

== Honours ==
- 3 seasons at the third tier of Polish association football - including a 9th place in 1982–83
- Reaching the central level of the Polish Cup - 1978–79 and 1980–81.
