= Bernard Kryszkiewicz =

Polish priest

Venerable Bernard Kryszkiewicz CP
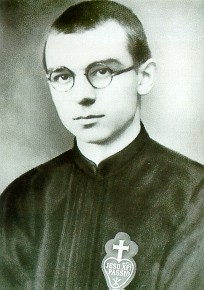
- Born: Zygmunt Kryszkiewicz; 2 May 1915; Mława, Poland
- Died: 7 July 1945 (aged 30); Przasnysz, Poland

Bernard Kryszkiewicz, born Zygmunt Kryszkiewicz, (2 May 1915 – 7 July 1945) was a Polish priest of the Passionist Congregation. During the cause of his beatification process, whose cause for beatification is in progress.

== Life ==
Zygmunt Kryszkiewicz was born into the family of mechanical workshop owner, Tadeusz Kryszkiewicz and his wife, Apolonia Gołębiowska, in Mława, Poland on 2 May 1915. As a child he attended school at the local college. In 1928, at his mother's instigation, he began further studies at the school of the Passionsts in Przasnysz.

He entered the Passionist Congregation as a novice in 1933, taking the name Bernard of the Mother of Fair Love, and one year later made his first vows. He was sent to Rome in 1936 to study theology at the headquarters of the Passionist Congregation and made his perpetual profession of vows one year later. In 1938, he was ordained a priest and returned to Poland.

In the spring of 1939 he was appointed deputy director of seminarians in Przasnysz. After the outbreak of WWII, he went to the Passionist house in Rawa Mazowiecka, which was the only house of the Passionist Congregation to remain open during the German occupation. There he devoted himself to educational and pastoral work and was entitled director of the seminarians. In 1945, the Passionist house was turned into a hospital and Bernard worked as nurse and cook. In March, he returned to Przasnysz to supervise the restoration of the buildings to religious use. Father Bernard tended to the sick, wounded and displaced. Due to his work among the sick he contracted typhus and died in July 1945 at the age of 30. His tomb is located in the Passionist church of Przasnysz.

== Beatification process ==
The beatification process for Kryszkiewicz began on 11 June 1983. The diocesan investigations took place in the diocese of Płock. On 22 May 2021 Pope Francis declared the heroic degree of virtue.
