= Józef Sawa-Caliński =

Polish noble

Józef Sawa-Caliński (about 1736 – May 1771) was a Polish noble and a prominent leader of the Confederation of Bar, a movement aimed against the Polish king and his close relations with Russia.

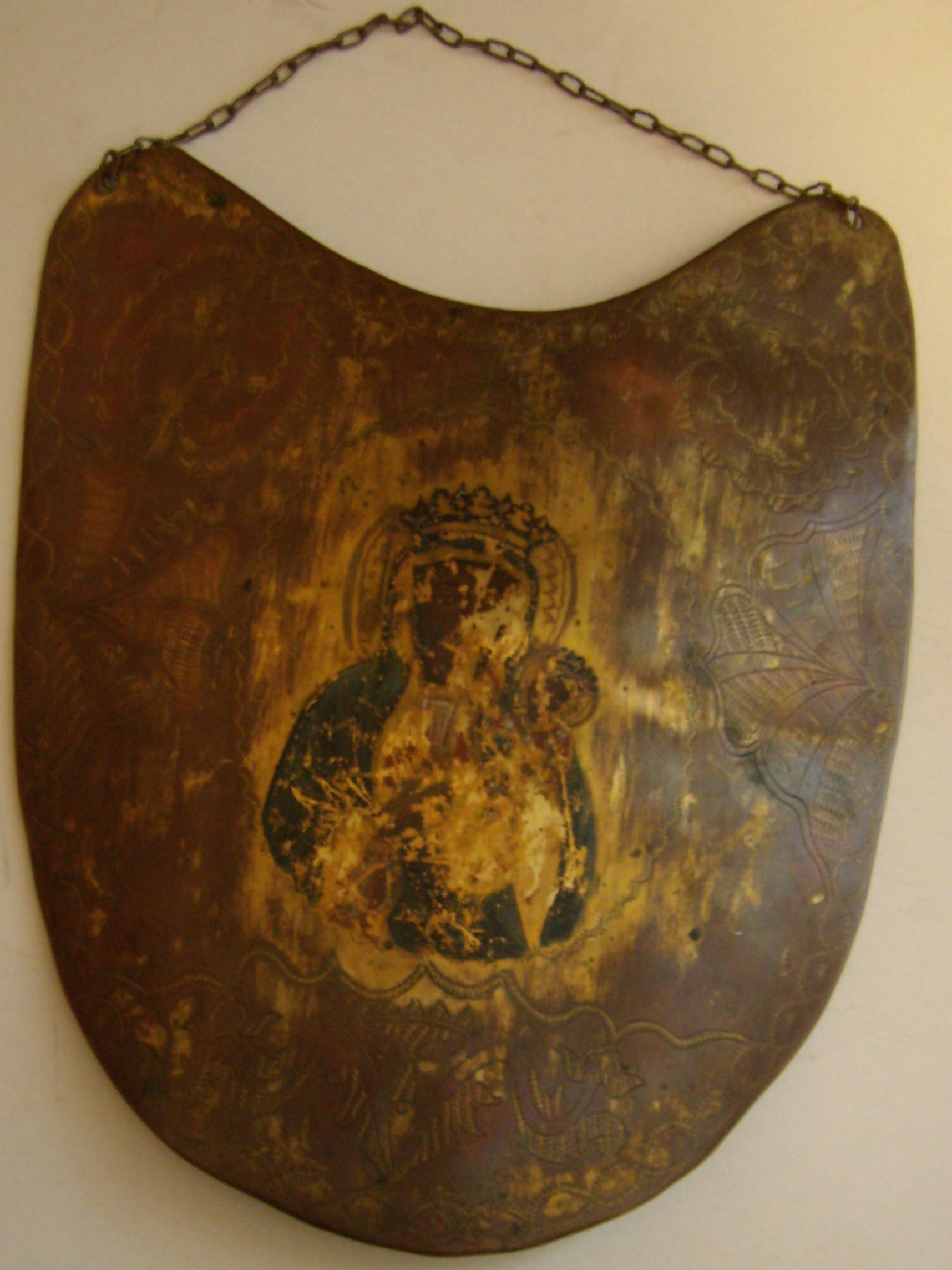
Józef Sawa-Caliński's gorget

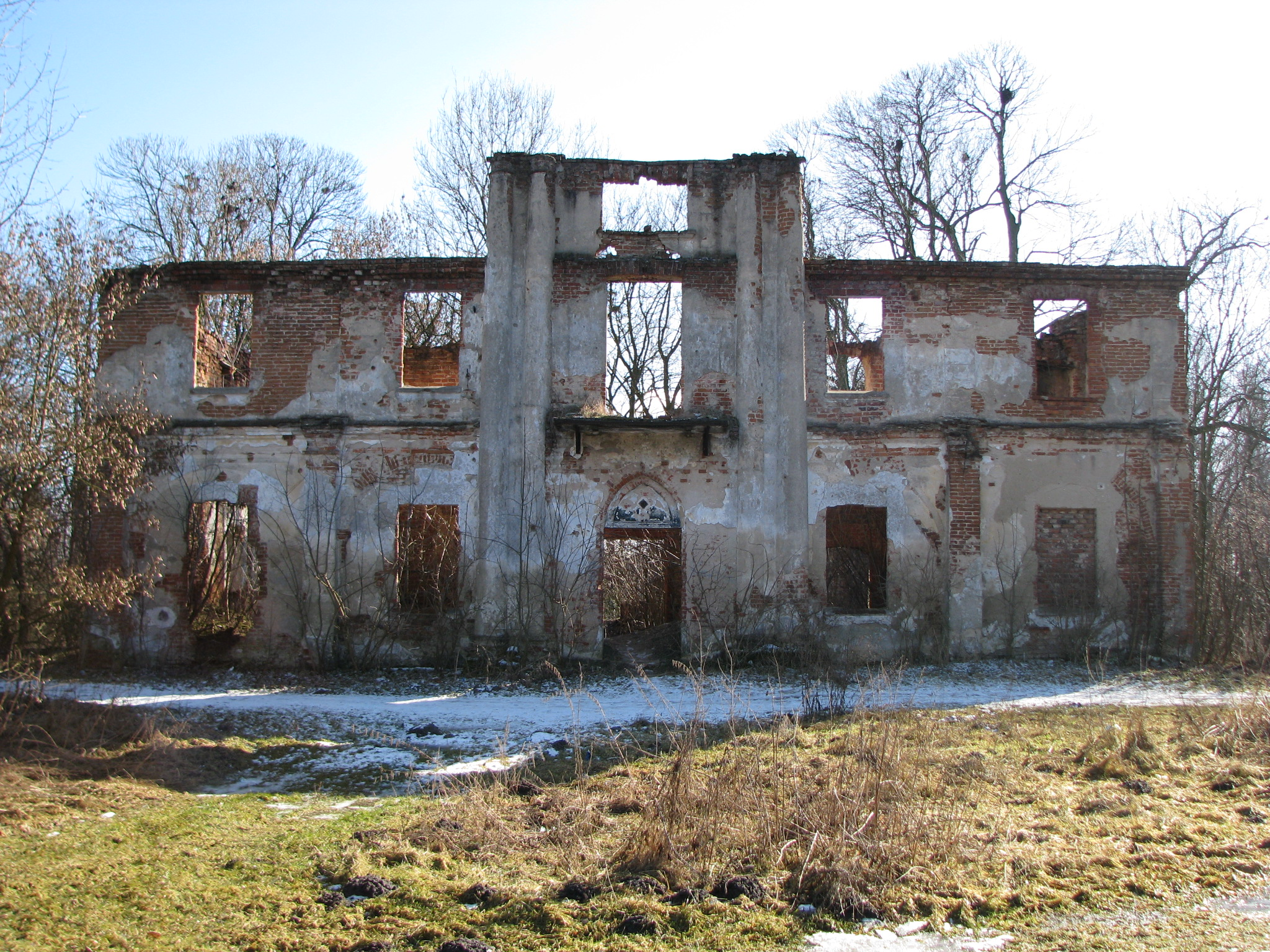
neoclassical palace ruins of Castle Szreńsk the Confederates of Bar stronghold

Born in Stepashky on Southern Bug to colonel Sawa a Cossack and a Polish noble, little is known of his early life. After the outbreak of hostilities following the proclamation of the Confederation of Bar in 1768, Sawa-Caliński organized a partisan unit of roughly 2000 armed men. He then engaged in partisan warfare in various parts of Poland, mostly against Russian garrisons and units. He successfully evaded being captured and styled himself a Cossack, which added to his popularity among the gentry, who even elected him a marshal of the land of Wyszogród. Antoni Madaliński and Józef Kuźma were belong to his partizan unit. However, on 26 April 1771 his troop was finally surrounded near Szreńsk and defeated by the Russians. Józef Sawa-Caliński was heavily wounded in the battle, yet he avoided being captured and hid himself in the forests and villages nearby. Sold to the Russians by one of the peasants, he was imprisoned and perished soon afterwards. Died in Przasnysz after a few days.

His life was immortalized by Juliusz Słowacki in his Beniowski (poem based on Maurice Benyovszky's life), Sen srebrny Salomei (en: The Silver Dream of Salomea"), Henryk Rzewuski, Pamiątki Soplicy.
