= Michał Jan Pac =

Polish–Lithuanian nobleman (1730–1787)

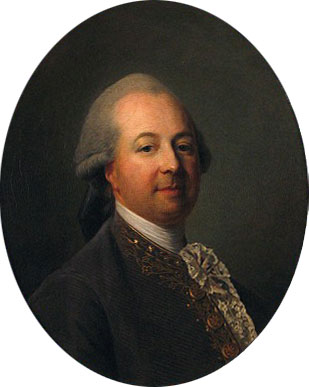
- Coat of arms: Gozdawa
- Born: 1730
- Died: 1787 (aged 56–57)
- Noble family: Pac

Michał Jan Pac (1730–1787) was a Polish–Lithuanian nobleman, Lithuanian Marshal of the Bar Confederation from 1769 until 1772, and Chamberlain of King Augustus III of Poland.

He lived in exile in France after the defeat of the Confederation.
