= Jan Aleksander Krasiński =

Polish nobleman (1756–1790)

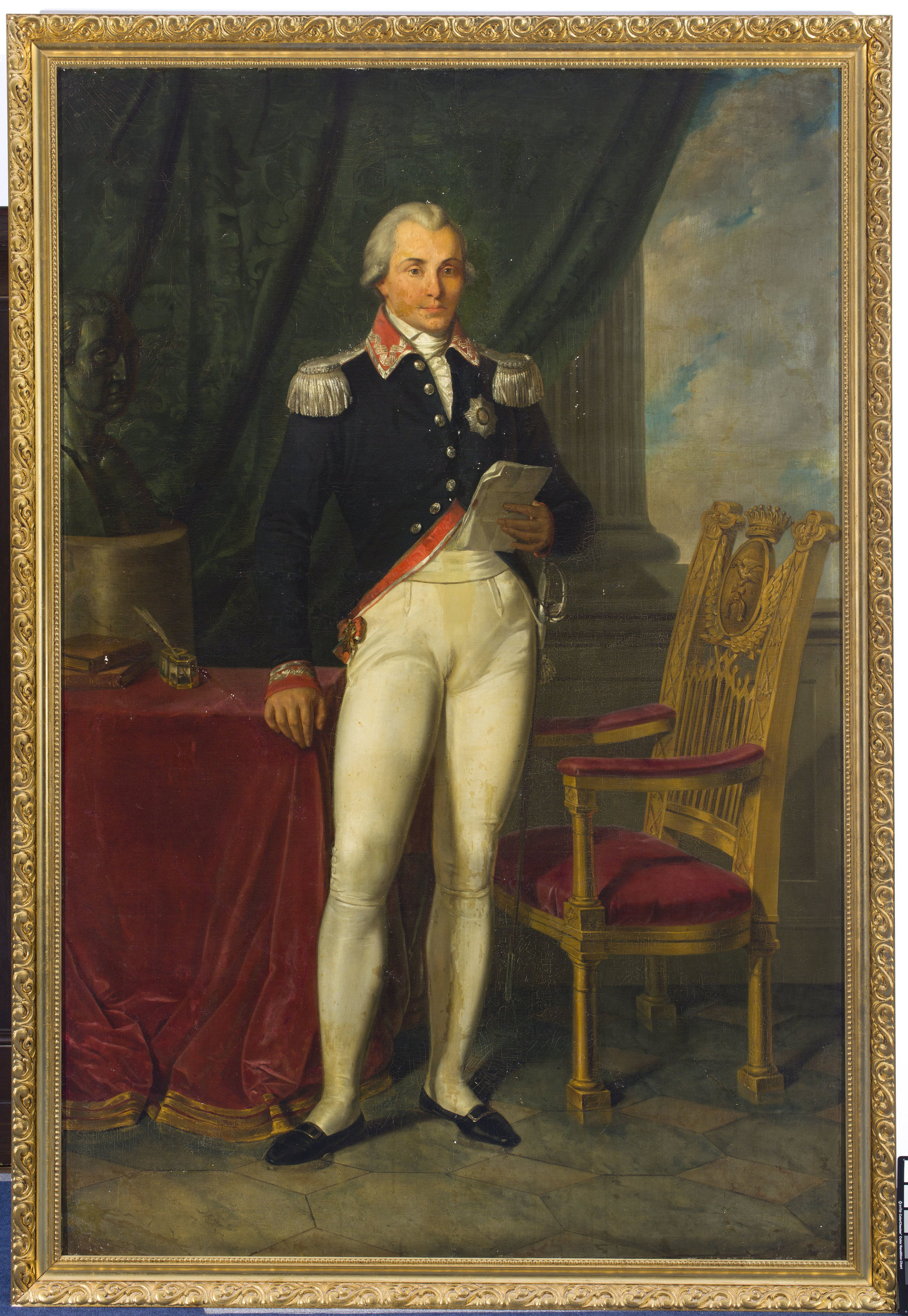
- Coat of arms: Ślepowron
- Born: 5 April 1756
- Died: 24 November 1790 (aged 34)
- Family: Krasiński
- Consort: Antonina Czacka
- Issue: Wincenty Krasiński
- Father: Michał Krasiński
- Mother: Aleksandra Załuska

Jan Aleksander Krasiński (1756–1790) was a Polish nobleman (szlachcic).
