= Abraham Lichtstein =

Israeli author

Rabbi Abraham Lichtstein
- Title: Av Beis Din

Personal life
- Born: Late 18th century Białystok, Poland
- Died: 19th century
- Parent: Rabbi Eliezer Lipman Lichtstein
- Notable work: Kanfei Nesharim
- Known for: Kanfei Nesharim
- Occupation: Rabbi, Talmudist

Religious life
- Religion: Judaism

Senior posting
- Post: Av Beis Din of Przasnysz, Poland

Abraham Lichtstein (Hebrew: אברהם לכטשטיין) was a Polish rabbi and Talmudist. He served as the Av Beis Din of Przasnysz, Poland and authored a commentary on the Pentateuch entitled Kanfei Nesharim (Hebrew: כנפי נשרים, "Wings of Eagles").

== Early life, education and career ==
Lichtstein was born in Białystok at the end of the eighteenth century. He was the son of Rabbi Eliezer Lipman Lichtstein and grandson of Rabbi Kalman of Białystok.

His major work, Kanfei Nesharim, was published in Warsaw in 1881. The sefer is divided into several parts, each with a separate name:

1. Kiryat Sefer, an introduction to each book of the Pentateuch
2. To'aliyyot ha-Ralbag, a treatment of the doctrines deduced by Gersonides from passages of the Torah
3. Abach Soferim, miscellanea
4. Machazeh Abraham, consisting of sermons on each section of the Torah
5. Ner Mitzvah, a treatment of the number of the precepts according to Maimonides
6. Shiyyure Miẓwah, a treatment of the additional precepts according to Nahmanides, Moses ben Jacob of Coucy, and Isaac ben Joseph of Corbeil
7. Milchemet Mitzvah, on the disputes among various authorities concerning the numbering of the precepts by Maimonides
8. Torat ha-Ḳorbanot, on the Levitical laws of offerings and on the order of the High Priest's service in the Sanctuary on Yom Kippur
9. Sha'arei Tziyyon, orations on theological subjects

The whole work was published together with the text of the Pentateuch (Josefow, 1829) and republished without the text (Vilna, 1894).

Lichtstein also authored a commentary on the Sefer ha-Tappuach, which was published together with the text in the Grodno edition of 1799.
