= Johann Martin von Elmpt =

Russian field marshal (1725–1802)

Reichsgraf Johann-Martin von Elmpt
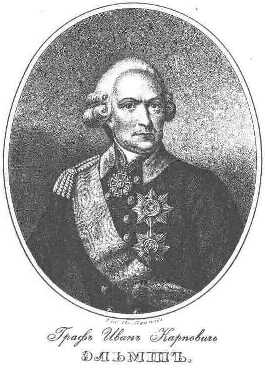
- Born: 1725; Kleve, Kingdom of Prussia
- Died: 1802 (aged 76–77); Svitene Manor, Courland Governorate, Russian Empire
- Other name: Ivan Karpovich Elmpt
- Military career
- Allegiance: France; Russia
- Branch: Imperial Russian Army
- Service years: 1749–1798
- Rank: Field marshal
- Conflicts: Seven Years' War; Russo-Turkish War (1768–1774); Siege of Khotyn; War of the Bar Confederation; Russo-Turkish War (1787–1792)
- Awards: Order of St. Anna; Order of St. Alexander Nevsky; Order of St. Andrew

Johann Martin Reichsgraf von Elmpt (Russian: Ива́н Ка́рпович Эльмпт, romanized: Ivan Karpovich Elmpt; 1725/1726 – 10 May [O.S. 28 April] 1802) was a Russian military officer. A German nobleman, he entered Russian service after first serving in France. He went on to command troops in many of Russia's wars during the reign of Catherine the Great.

== Biography ==
Born in Kleve and descended from a family of old German nobility, Johann was the son of Baron Kaspar von Elmpt (died 1730), and after receiving his initial education in his native town, he entered the service of the French army. In 1749, he transferred to the Russian army with the rank of captain. He quickly advanced through the ranks, being promoted to colonel on 25 December 1755.

Elmpt distinguished himself during the Prussian campaigns of the Seven Years' War. He was appointed a brigadier, and then made a major-general on 2 April 1762. He served as quartermaster general for the field army, and performed a number of vital staff responsibilities, including the drawing up of military maps for Livonia and Courland, including plans for field camps and troop dispositions throughout the region. In 1763 he was awarded the Order of Saint Anna. With the formation of a field army in Glukhov under Pyotr Rumyantsev in 1768 to fight the Turks, Elmpt was made part of its command staff, but he transferred to another field army the following year.

In September 1769, Elmpt and Mikhail Kamensky under orders from Alexander Mikhailovich Golitsyn, crossed a large force of Grenadier regiments over the Dniester river to assault the fortress at Khotyn, leading to a battle that decimated the Turkish forces there. Later Elmpt participated in the seizure of Iași, and commanded a special detachment of the main army stationed on the Dniester and Bug River. He was rewarded for these feats with the Order of Alexander Nevsky and a promotion to the rank of Lieutenant General.

In 1772, Elmpt was a major commander of troops against the Bar Confederation, later commanding a corps guarding the borders with Sweden. Promoted yet again to full General in 1780, he would serve as commander of the Russian 3rd Division in the Russo-Turkish War of 1787–1792. Elmpt's tense relationship with his Austrian counterpart General Gabriel von Splényi created problems in the military operations between the two armies. Rumyantsev intervened and made Elmpt give command of his division over to Major General Ernst Salignac. Elmpt returned to Riga, claiming poor health.

In 1790, Elmpt was rewarded with the dignity of a Reichsgraf (Imperial Count) of the Holy Roman Empire, an honor that was confirmed in the Russian peerage in December of that same year.

With the ascension of Emperor Paul I of Russia, Elmpt found his military career revived. He was given command of all army forces stationed in the Livonian Military Division based out of Riga, his rank was adjusted to that of General of Infantry, and he was given the honorary position of Chief of the prestigious Saint Petersburg Grenadier Regiment, rechristened under his own name. On the day of Paul's formal coronation (5 April 1797), Elmpt was awarded the dual high honors of the Order of St. Andrew and promotion to the rank of field marshal. On 10 January 1798, Elmpt was discharged from military service due to his advanced age, but was permitted the privilege to continue to wear his army uniform in public. He died four years later at Svitene Manor on his estate in what is today southern Latvia.

His son Philipp was bethrothed to Suvorov's only daughter Natalie; but she broke off the engagement. As Philipp had no male issue, the title of Count von Elmpt was inherited by his son-in-law Joseph Carl von Anrep.
