= Bohdan Urbankowski =

Polish writer, poet and philosopher (1943–2023)

Bohdan Urbankowski (19 May 1943 – 15 June 2023) was a Polish writer, poet, and philosopher.

An opposition activist in the People's Republic of Poland, he received several awards for his publications, most of which were published underground (bibuła).

Urbankowski was the author of over 40 books, including many biographies including those of Adam Mickiewicz, Józef Piłsudski and John Paul II.

Urbankowski died on 15 June 2023, at the age of 80.

== Selected works ==
- Dostojewski - dramat humanizmów. 1978
- Czerwona msza, albo usmiech Stalina (The Red Mass, or Stalin's Smile). 1995, 2011
- Józef Piłsudski: marzyciel i strateg (Józef Piłsudski: Dreamer and Strategist). 1997
- Trzema drogami nadziei Opowieść o wędrówkach Karola Wojtyły. 2002
- Poeta, czyli człowiek zwielokrotniony. Szkice o Zbigniewie Herbercie. 2004

== Links ==
- (in Polish) Longer bio
- (in Polish) Short bio and some poems
- (in Polish) Short bio
