= Battles of Lanckorona =

War of the Bar Confederation clashes

Coordinates: 49.845699°N 19.715431°E

Clashes at Lanckorona (1771)
- Part of War of the Bar Confederation
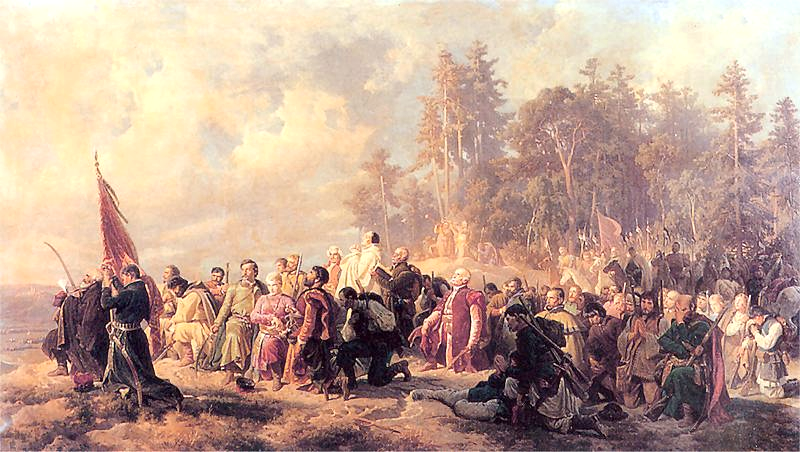
- "Prayer of the Bar Confederation before the battle of Lanckorona"; Painting by Artur Grottger
Date	20 February: 1st (Note: Combat of Lanckorona) & 2nd (Note: Storming of the Lanckorona Castle) clashes 21 May: 3rd (Note: Battle of Lanckorona) clash
Location	Lanckorona and its castle, Kraków Voivodeship, Kingdom of Poland, Poland-Lithuania
Result	• Russian victory – 1st clash; • Confederate victory – 2nd clash; • Russian victory – 3rd clash

Belligerents
Russian Empire	Bar Confederation; (Kingdom of France) France; Holy Roman Empire (Note: Recruited deserters, including Austrians and Prussians)

Commanders and leaders
Alexander Suvorov (WIA); Ivan Drewitz	(Kingdom of France) Charles Dumouriez; Józef Miączyński (POW); Kajetan Sapieha †; Michał Walewski

Strength
approx. 1,000 infantry (Note: Władysław Konopczyński: According to a French officer, Suvorov had 1,800 men, of which 800 cavalry (it was uncommitted).; Władysław Miączyński: A report from the Russian side suggested that Suvorov's forces were much smaller and may have numbered as few as 150 soldiers.; Alexander Petrushevsky: "His corps [Suvorov's] was not numerous; never afterward did it reach 4,000, and at the beginning [1769] it was even less.") (1st & 2nd clashes): 3,000–3,500 men; 8 cannons.; (3rd clash)	700 cavalry and infantry (Note: According to Polish data, 400 cavalrymen & 80 infantrymen during the first engagement (no infantry involved). According to Russian data, 300 infantrymen in the second engagement.) (1st & 2nd clashes): 3,500–4,000 men; 32 cannons, of which 2 deployed. (Note: There were 30 cannons in the town and castle, which Dumouriez did not use.); (3rd clash)

Casualties and losses
Unknown (1st clash) Great (Note: Osipov wrote of Suvorov's "great losses", without specifying the number. Along with the officers and Suvorov himself, who was wounded: 37 casualties according to Petrushevsky. A Polish source claimed that a French officer suggested Russian casualties of 400–500.) (2nd clash) Negligible (Note: Petrushevsky wrote that the loss of the Russians was negligible/insignificant, and was mostly done by gunshots fired from the Lanckorona Castle during the Russian pursuit of the retreating Poles, but no number is specified. The offence that decided the battle was carried out so quickly that the attackers were almost unharmed.) (3rd clash)	Unknown (1st clash) Uncertain (Note: According to a French officer's account, the Poles were to lose 11 men killed.) (2nd clash): 500 killed and 200 prisoners; 2 cannons.; (3rd clash)

The first encounter at the site of the events, – the field combat of Lanckorona, – then the storming of the Lanckorona Castle (Polish: Obrona Lanckorony, lit. 'Defense of Lanckorona') and finally the second field engagement – namely the battle of Lanckorona (Russian: Лянцкоронское сражение; Polish: Bitwa pod Lanckoroną) – were three distinct clashes of the Bar Confederation that took place at Lanckorona Castle, on the plains before Lanckorona, and in the town ifself, a small settlement 27 km (17 mi) southwest of the de jure Polish capital Kraków (de facto capital was Warsaw). The first two engagements took place on 20 February 1771, and the third on 21 May of the same year. The clashes involved a detachment of the Russian army of Ivan Weymarn led by Alexander Vasilyevich Suvorov and Polish force with other European troops under the command of the French envoy Charles François Dumouriez. The field encounters where Dumouriez was attacked ended successfully for Suvorov, but the Russian commander failed to take the castle by assault.

Alexander Suvorov had already fought the Confederates in a substantial battle the year before last — he gave a heavy defeat to Casimir Pulaski at Orzechowo. Here, in the battle of Orzechowo, possessing a detachment not reaching 400 men, Suvorov won against 2,000 Polish Confederates.

== Background ==
Dumouriez arrived at Eperies, in Hungary, where the high council of the Confederates was assembled. Instead of mature statesmen and military men, he found here a society of noble revelers, engaged only in drinking, gambling and red tape. His disappointment increased when he became acquainted with the state of the Confederate cause. Even on paper the number of troops did not exceed 16 or 17,000, but in practice it was barely 10,000. There were no infantry, no artillery, no forts; the leaders numbered as many as eight, but each was independent of the others; discord and division reigned among them; there was not a shadow of discipline in the troops. It was impossible for Dumouriez to bring the Eperies' agitators to an agreement, and he resorted to the Countess Mniszchowa, a woman of intelligence, learning, dexterity, and cunning, who enjoyed great influence among the Confederates. It was only with her skilful assistance that he succeeded in getting some agreement and carrying out his plans.

During the night of 29 January 1771 (O.S.: 18 January 1771 (Note: The 1884 edition of Petrushevsky's book has an erroneous date of "April 18" (Old Style). The 1900 edition corrected this to "January 18".)), attacked on all points by overwhelming forces, the Russian detachments in Kraków Voivodeship were pushed back across the Vistula with heavy losses, and the whole nearby lands passed into Confederate hands. Dumouriez fortified many advantageous positions. But success turned heads: discipline disappeared; towns were pillaged; Jews were subjected to violence. At this time Suvorov struck out at Dumouriez.

== First clash (Combat of Lanckorona) ==
The combat was a small skirmish. Alexander Suvorov moved quickly from Lublin, the district of which he was chief. He defeated several units on his way, approached Lanckorona and on 20 February 1771 (O.S.: 9 February 1771) the Russian infantry came up, dragging the Polish spikes away, and pushed Miączyński's cavalry out of Lanckorona, capturing the village. In this affair Suvorov's hat and coat were pierced by bullets. Soon afterwards, the Russian commander wanted to seize the castle as well. The infantry climbed up the mountain where the castle was and took possession of two cannons, meanwhile launching a besiegement of the Lanckorona Castle.

== Second clash (Storming of the Lanckorona Castle) ==
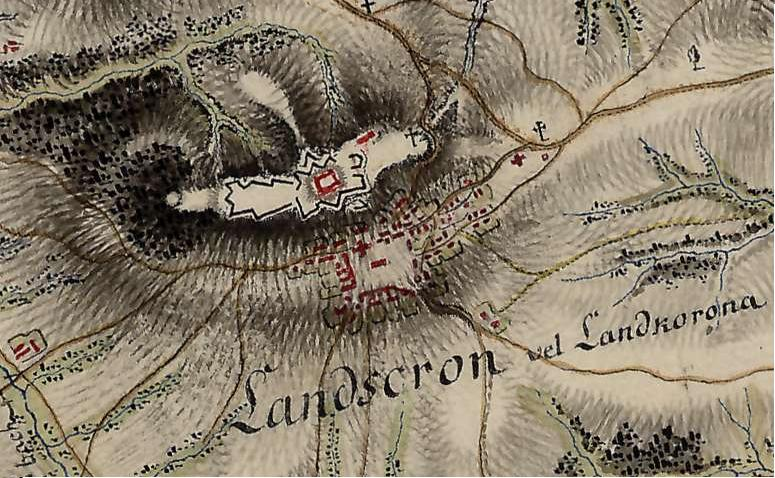
Lanckorona, 1772

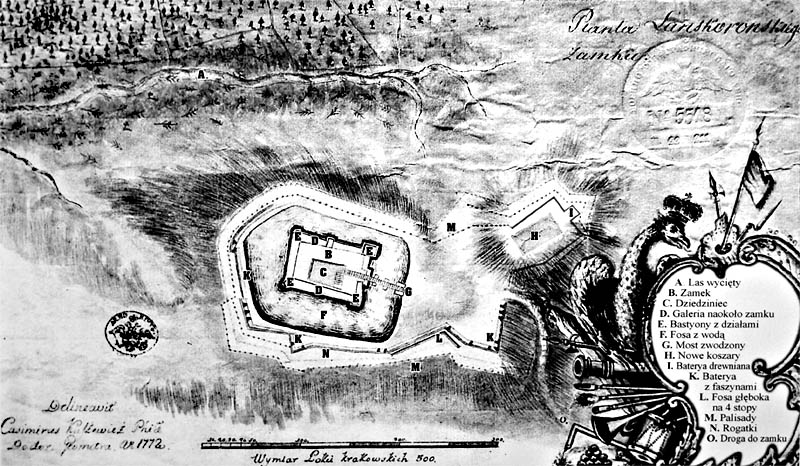
Lanckorona Castle, 1772

Miączyński entrusted the defense of the castle to French officers. Warrant Officer Podladchikov, who was at the head of the column, punctured the gate and attacked the last Polish gun inside the castle, but was badly wounded; at the same time Captain Ditmar and Lieutenant Artsybashev, who commanded the column, were wounded. The column retreated; the second one came, but its commander Lieutenant Sakharov and another Lieutenant Suvorov were seriously wounded. A part of the reserve ran up, and its commander Lieutenant Mordvinov was also wounded. Suvorov himself was scratched, his horse was wounded beneath him; there were hardly any officers left in the ranks. Suvorov brought the men to order and quietly stepped back.

The Bar Confederates successfully defended the Lanckorona Castle. The Russians were forced to retreat after a failed assault with a loss of at least 37 men (Polish source claims 400–500 Russian casualties — according to a contemporary French officer's suggestion), a surprising victory for the significantly outnumbered Polish force of no more than 300 men.

Suvorov reported:

This failure did not depended either on the plan, or the impudence, or even the order of battle that all the officers observed; for the sake of Your Excellency, I humbly ask us to leave this issue to other services; it all depended on the fate of God.

He also said about "incessant unnecessary firing". It is easy to imagine how hard it was for Suvorov to confess this after a few days, writing the following lines to Weymarn:

The Lanckorona incident depended on Suzdal's men, who are not at all like they were when I was with them. These heroes can now be likened to a flock of sheep. As soon as I can, I must go to Sandomierz and train them as I did before… Don't reproach me, merciful sovereign. I thought with Suzdal's men I could win the whole world.

== Third clash (Battle of Lanckorona) ==
=== Preconditions: Action of the Tyniec Abbey ===
The Russian forces executed an unexpected attack in the early hours of the morning. Suvorov's detachment totalled 3,600 men (when Suvorov again marched from Lublin, he had 1,600 men, and then Drewitz's detachment of 2,000 transferred to him), while the Poles possessed 800 men. Charles Dumouriez himself was quietly dining in Zator and then learned that the Russians were already in Kraków; he rode to Skawina—Suvorov was already in Skawina. On Dumouriez's way, in the villages the Confederates slept peacefully, their horses unsaddled, no one suspected the enemy's proximity. Then Suvorov made two assaults on the Tyniec redoubt, containing a palisade, three rows of trous de loup, and fortified with two cannon, but both times was knocked out of it. Almost all the infantry sitting at Tyniec consisted of Austrian deserters. Dumouriez had partly managed to take advantage of the few hours spent by Suvorov at Tyniec by pulling in some troops. As much as it was against Suvorov's rules to start an endeavor and leave it unfinished, he realized that this would be the lesser evil; he held back from further attacks and reached Lanckorona under the fire of the Confederates lined up on the heights. At Tyniec and in the preceding skirmishes with the Confederates the Russians lost 90 men killed and wounded; the Confederates lost 75 prisoners and about 100 killed; besides, the Russians took 2 cannons from the Tyniec redoubt. The action of Tyniec was still an undoubted success for the Confederates.

=== Lanckorona battle progress ===
The third combat before the mount of Lanckorona, and one of the largest clashes of Polish and Russian forces during the Bar Confederation, took place on 21 May 1771 (O.S.: 10 May 1771). A Confederate formation of around 3,500 men including French volunteers and recruited Austro-Prussian deserters with 2 cannons was attacked by 3,500 Russians commanded again by general Alexander Suvorov.

Looking over the position, Suvorov ordered Chuguyev Cossacks of the vanguard and a squadron of carabiniers, forming the left flank of the Russian corps, to attack the center of the enemy, without waiting for the other forces to approach. The Cossacks rushed at the Confederates in a scattering, not disturbed by the fire of chasseurs à pied, who were ordered to be silent by Dumouriez, confident in victory and fearing only one thing—that Suvorov would not postpone his allegedly reckless attack. The Poles were to attack the Russians only at the moment when these will enter the crest of the heights, in the inevitable disorder. And if the chasseurs were forbidden to fire, then for the same purpose, of course, the artillery of the castle and the city should also be silenced. Dumouriez's calculation turned out to be false.

The Cossacks, having climbed the heights, immediately rode down and rushed to the center and the right flank, where the troops of Sapieha and Lithuanians of Orzeszko were; carabineers galloped after them. The Confederates retreated. Dumouriez rushed in to encourage them and arrange them; Sapieha turned the fugitives on the enemy with sword blows, but nothing helped: Sapieha was stabbed by his own; Orzeszko and several brave men who accompanied him fell under Cossack pikes. Dumouriez rushed to the hussars of Schütz to correct the case with their help, but they gave a volley of carbines and retreated. Meanwhile, the Russian infantry (Saint Petersburg & Astrakhan regiments) with the rest of the cavalry approached, knocked out the French chasseurs à pied from the central grove and climbed the heights. Miączyński tried to reflect infantry's attack, rushed to meet it and bravely broke into its ranks, but it was no good for the Poles: Miączyński was knocked off his horse, wounded and taken prisoner, his cavalry was repulsed and driven away. Everything then rushed into disarray; only Walewski, who occupied the left flank of the position, and Dumouriez with a small detachment of the French retreated in order. Russian cavalry pursued fleeing for several kilometres and caused them great damage. The battle of Lanckorona lasted only half an hour.

French envoy lieutenant-colonel Dumouriez was caught off guard and was unable to assemble his men. The battle was thus a decisive victory for the Russians.

== Aftermath ==
In the last, third fight, the loss of the Russians was negligible and was produced by shots fired from the castle during the pursuit, while the Confederates lost 500 men killed and 200 prisoners of war. Many historians argue that the defeat at Lanckorona was sabotage on the part of Dumouriez as he was privately outspoken against the Polish nation and its Roman Catholic aspirations. Dumouriez was noted as calling Poland an "Asiatic nation" and relying on his French and European volunteers which lost the battle instead of "Asiats". This interpretation is lent weight by Dumouriez's later betrayal of Tadeusz Kościuszko when he passed on the plans for the Kościuszko Uprising to Prussia in 1793. Antoine-Charles du Houx and Baron de Vioménil replaced Dumouriez in the Bar Confederation army.

Suvorov's next decisive engagement with the Confederates would be the Battle of Stołowicze.
