= Battle of Stołowicze =

War of the Bar Confederation battle

Coordinates: 53°12′53″N 26°02′12″E

- Part of War of the Bar Confederation
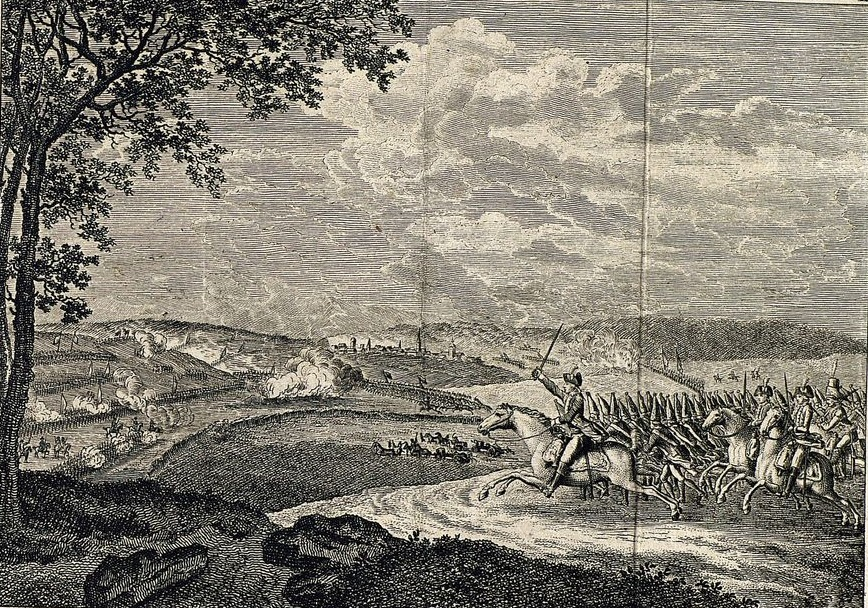
- Battle of Stołowicze by Johann Friedrich Anthing
Date	24 (O.S.: 13) September 1771 (Note: In Petrushevsky's book it is written that Suvorov reports the victory on the 13th (Old Style).)
Location	Stołowicze, Grand Duchy of Lithuania, Polish-Lithuanian Commonwealth
Result	Russian victory

Belligerents
Bar Confederation	Russian Empire

Commanders and leaders
Michał Kazimierz Ogiński; Józef Bielak	Alexander Suvorov; 2nd Maj. Kiselyov

Strength
Ogiński: 4,000 (3,000 participated) Bielak: 1,000 12 guns	900 (822 participated); 2 guns

Casualties and losses
100+ killed (Note: 100+ KIA; "Several hundred bodies covered the battlefield" (not necessarily dead)) "Lots of injured" 900+ prisoners All artillery pieces	~100 killed (Note: ~100; 100+); ~400 injured (Note: ~400; "Most of the unkilled are wounded")

The battle of Stołowicze (the battle of Stolovichi or Stalovichy (Note: Russian: Сталовичская битва)) was a clash of the War of the Bar Confederation. It took place on the 24 September 1771 and ended with the defeat of Bar Confederates by Russian general Alexander Suvorov. Michał Kazimierz Ogiński, the Bar commander, was forced into a brief exile.

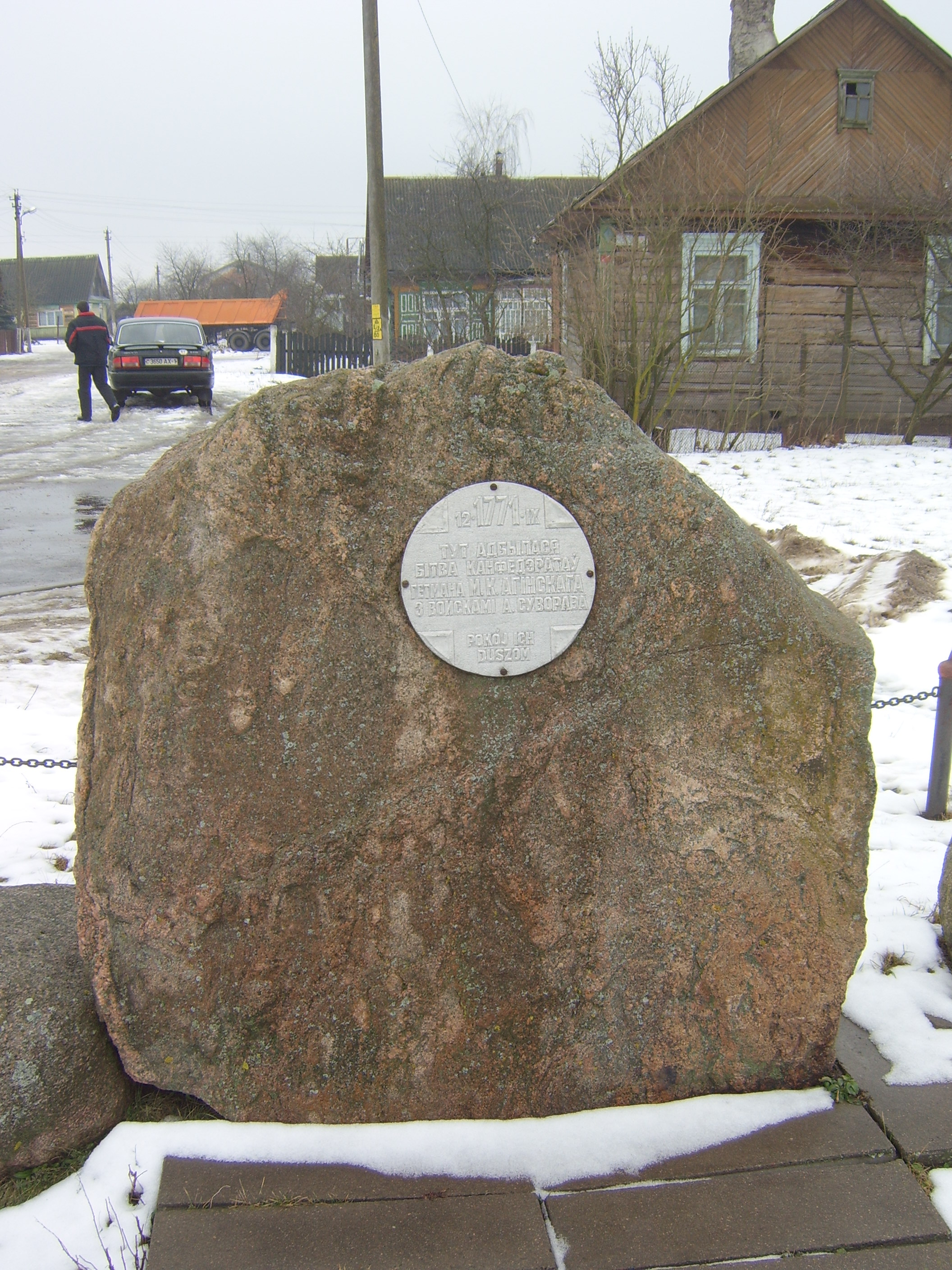
Belarus. Stalovichy or Stołowicze in Polish language. Monument to the battle of Stalovichy 1771-09-12 The combat actually took place on September 13 (24 Gregorian cal.); perhaps the 12th date symbolizes the start of Suvorov's march towards the town in the late evening.

== Preparations ==
Alexander Suvorov smashed a numerically superior Confederate force under the command of Casimir Pulaski at Orzechowo and later under the French envoy Charles Dumouriez at Lanckorona, preparing to fight them again. Suvorov, incidentally, also suffered two of the rare rebuffs, including the action of Tyniec.

To attack the Poles, Suvorov arranged his detachment in the following order: 4 companies of infantry in the line ahead, with 2 licornes in front of middle of the line, and behind, in reserve, the fifth company was placed in the same formation. In the third line were 3 squadrons, and they had another company plus Cossacks at the rear.

== Battle ==
Significant disproportion in numbers forced Suvorov to act more cautiously in contrast to the past, especially since he was dealing with good, regular troops. Therefore, he did not move to attack as usual, but opened cannon fire and only when he noticed some confusion in the ranks of Ogiński's troops, quickly moved to the left, bypassing the most accessible right flank of the Poles. It marked the beginning of Suvorov's offensive. Ascending the high ground, he led his favorite bayonet attack; and there was also a minor combat between the cavalry. The Suzdalian infantrymen under Second Major Kiselyov were pushing their way through. Lithuanian Confederates defended themselves with courage: Ogiński's grenadiers fought desperately in hand-to-hand combat, in which Suvorov of his 900 detachment lost more than 100 men dead (according to another version, approximately 100 men died in the entire battle). Half of the others were injured; the officers were almost all knocked out. Nevertheless, Ogiński was completely defeated and his troops scattered.

Barely the battle was over, as the Polish general Bielak, standing half a mile away, arrived with 1,000 lancers to help Ogiński. He immediately attacked and surrounded 3 Russian squadrons, but the fortitude and fire of Kiselyov's infantry kept the Poles from further action and forced him to retreat. The Cossacks distinguished themselves in this last fight, which was won by the Russians at the cost of great effort.

== Result ==
On the battlefield the Poles and Lithuanians left more than 100 killed, many wounded and taken prisoner. Several colours, 12 field guns, 50,000 red gold, wagons, marshal's baton of Ogiński went to the winners.

Ogiński abandoned his scattered troops and fled to Königsberg.
