= Jozef Miaczinsky =

Polish-Lithuanian general

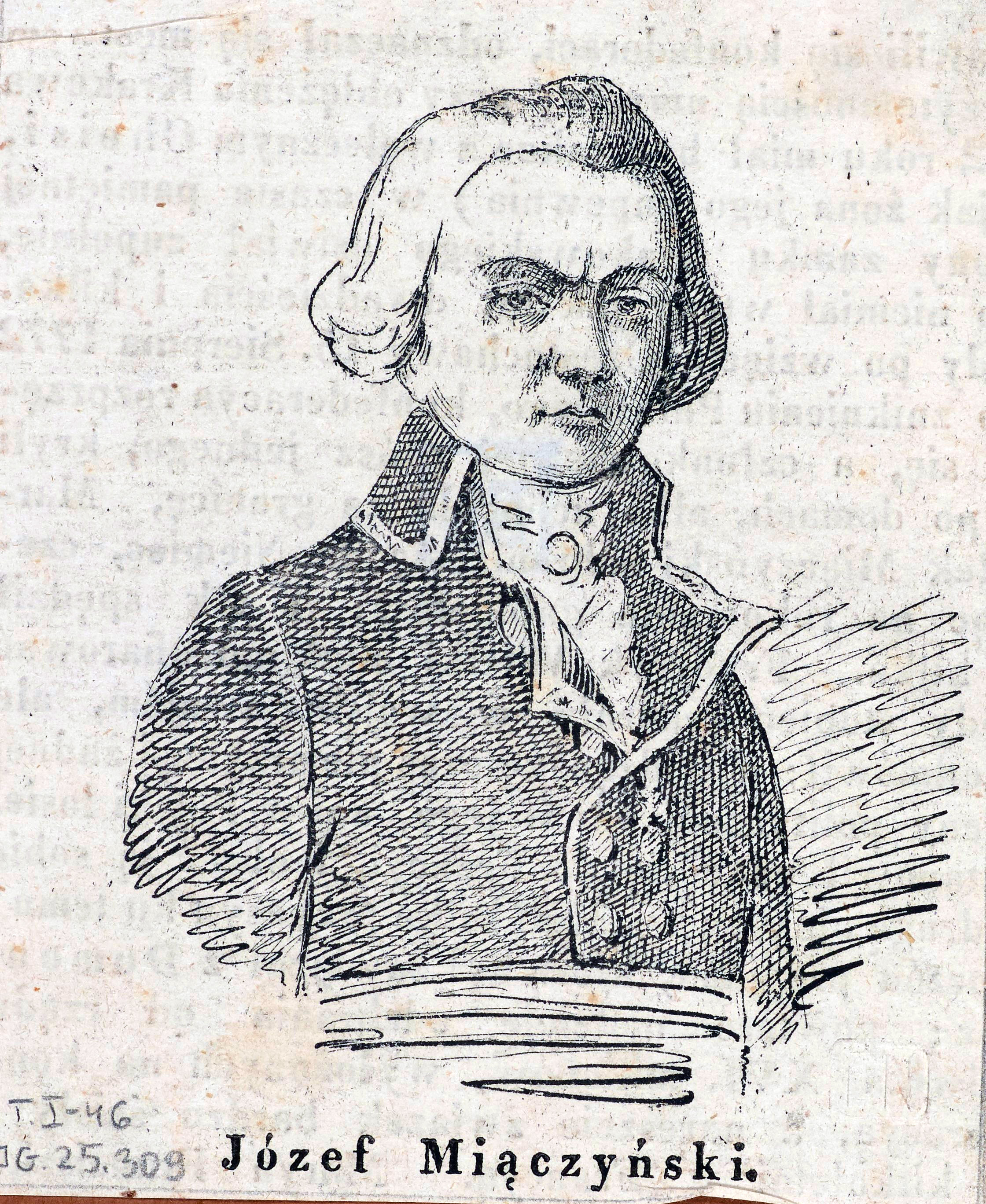
Józef Miączyński (jr)

Joseph Miaczinski or Józef Miączyński (1743/1751–1793) was a Polish-Lithuanian general (chef de brigade) who joined the French Army of the North on 25 July 1792, the day Brunswick Manifesto was published. He supported General Dumouriez, defending France against the Prussian and Austrian armies, occupying the Austrian Netherlands and the duchy of Limburg. Dumouriez, unsatisfied with the chaos in the Defence department caused by the Jacobins, preferred a constitutional monarchy. After Dumouriez's dismissal from the High Command, Miaczinski agreed to participate in the preparation of a military coup against the National Convention. In early April 1793, Miaczinsky was arrested, accused of criminal and counter-revolutionary activities, trialled, and executed.

== Life ==
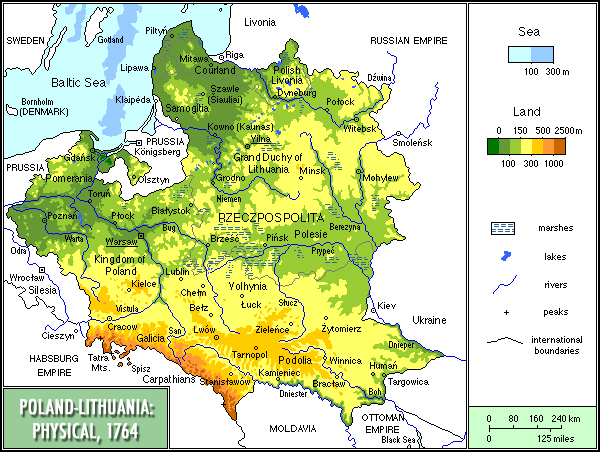
The Polish–Lithuanian Commonwealth as inherited by Stanisław Poniatowski in 1764. The country was partitioned out of existence during Poniatowski's reign (in 1772, 1793, and 1795).

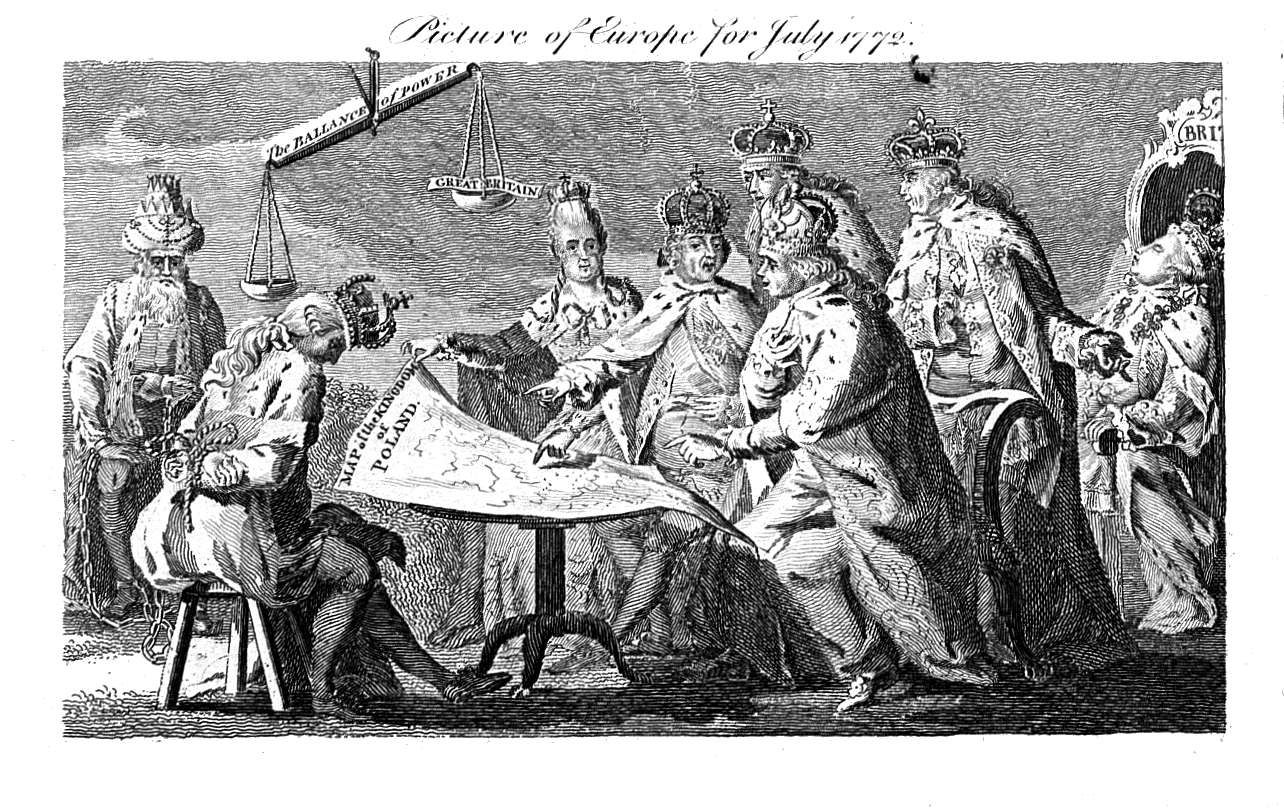
Picture of Europe for July 1772. Allegory of the First partition of Poland, showing Catherine the Great of Russia, Frederick II of Prussia and Joseph II of Austria agreeing to divide Poland with the tacit consent of Sultan Mustafa III; King George III of Britain is pushed to the background.

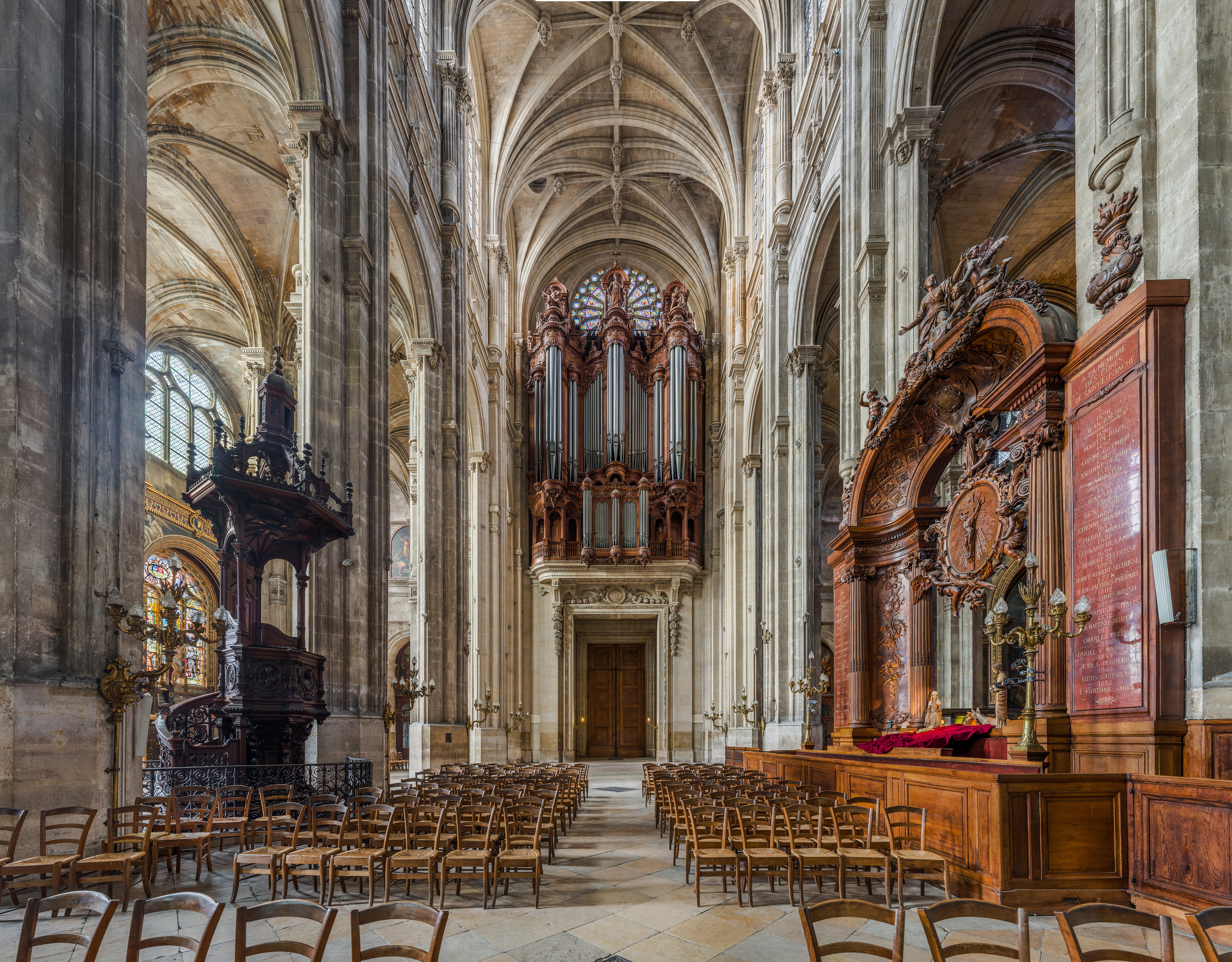
Church of St Eustace

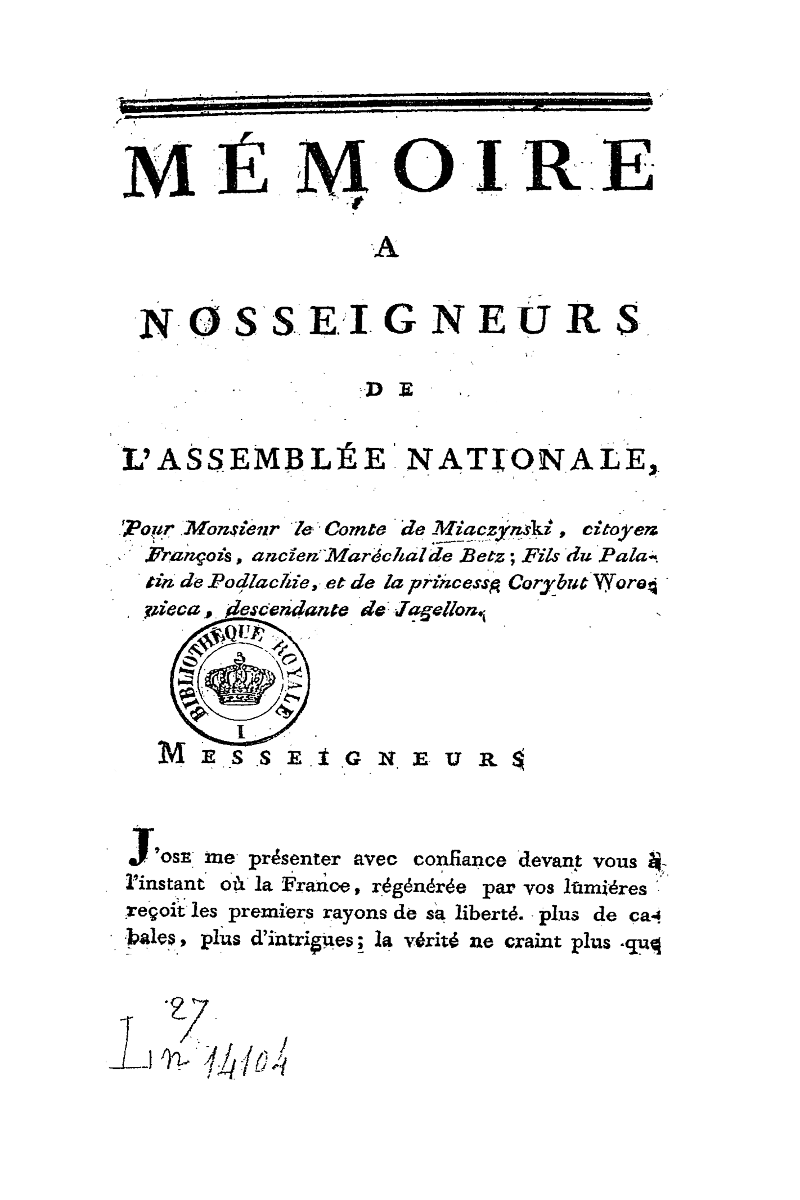
Joseph de Miaczynski – Mémoire à Nosseigneurs de l'Assemblée nationale, pour le comte de Miaczynski, page de titre (1790)

Count Miaczinsky was born in Poryck (now Pavlivka) or Selets in Volhynia (today Ukraine), 130 km north of Lviv; either in the year 1743 or in 1751. (Maybe he was lying when he told the French court his age was 42). His father came from a Szlachta family and was a palatine or a castellan of a city in Podlachia; his mother, a descended from the Jagiellonian dynasty. He studied at the Collegium Nobilium (Warsaw) until 1761.

In 1764, Catherine the Great placed Stanislaus Poniatowski, her former lover, on the Polish throne. In 1768, she formally became the protector of the political rights of dissidents and peasants of the Polish–Lithuanian Commonwealth, which provoked an anti-Russian uprising in Poland, the Bar Confederation (1768–1772), supported by France. After the rebels, their French and European volunteers, and their allied Ottoman Empire had been defeated, she established in the Commonwealth a system of government fully controlled by the Russian Empire through a Permanent Council, under the supervision of her Ambassadors and envoys from Russia to Poland (1763–1794).

In the early 1770s, the Polish–Lithuanian Commonwealth was in a particularly challenging situation, threatened by its neighbors on all sides, particularly Imperial Russia, Kingdom of Prussia and Austria. In an attempt to retain independence against the superior military might of the three great powers, some Poles joined together (in Podolia) to form the Bar Confederation.

In 1768, he became the military leader of the army of the Bar Confederation and was made a marshal of Belz (a small city close to Ukrainian-Polish border). The confederation was actively opposed by the Russian forces stationed in Poland. In 1770, the Council of the Bar Confederation proclaimed the pro-Russian Poniatowsky dethroned. In a controversy, Miaczinsky sided with Prince Radziwill, hetman of Lithuania and showed military talent; he led numerous skirmishes with Cossacks. Dumouriez undertook a diplomatic mission into Poland, where, in addition to his political mission, keeping an eye on Russia, he organized a Polish militia with French money. He fortified several fortresses around Kraków (Tyniec, Lanckorona, Częstochowa) and formed a Confederate infantry detachment to protect the warehouses in Podolia.

Casimir Pulaski en Miaczinsky became friendly with and were supported by the French colonel. In January 1771, the Russian detachments in Kraków Voivodeship were pushed back across the Vistula with heavy losses, and the whole nearby lands passed into Confederate hands. (The Kraków Castle was defended by Marquis de Choisy.) On 21 May, the Polish soldiers were smashed by the Russian forces of General Alexander Suvorov in the third clash. On the same day, Miaczinsky was taken prisoner by the Russians (in Kraków). Released against a ransom he joined the troops of the confederation and commanded 3,500 men.

The First Partition of Poland was decided on August 5, 1772 after the Bar Confederation lost the war with Russia. Russia, Prussia, and Austria had invaded and occupied much of Poland. Dumouriez returned to Paris; Baron de Vioménil succeeded him with whom Miaczinski stayed in contact.

When his father and brother died, he sold his possessions in Poland (to Prince Józef Poniatowski) and in November 1779 he moved to Versailles. In 1780 Miaczinsky married Maria Francesca Chaboteau in the church of Saint-Eustache, Paris. The couple lived in Saint-Maur-des-Fossés and had two sons. In 1783 he had large (old) debts, funding a cavalry, infantry, and artillery in Poland. Miaczinsky was imprisoned and escaped to Bavaria? His uncle in Chernihiv and Vergennes helped him out. In 1784, he received a pension from the King. In 1788 he was still in exile?

In July 1792, he was appointed by Dumouriez as maréchal de camp and attacked Clerfayt. From October till March he was in Sedan, Ardennes, commandant of the garrison, protecting the northeast of France with Arthur Dillon and General Valence. He participated in the Battle of Valmy, Battle of Jemappes, Siege of Maastricht (1793), the loss of Aachen and the Battle of Neerwinden (1793) under Francisco de Miranda, the only general from South America in French service.

== Lille ==
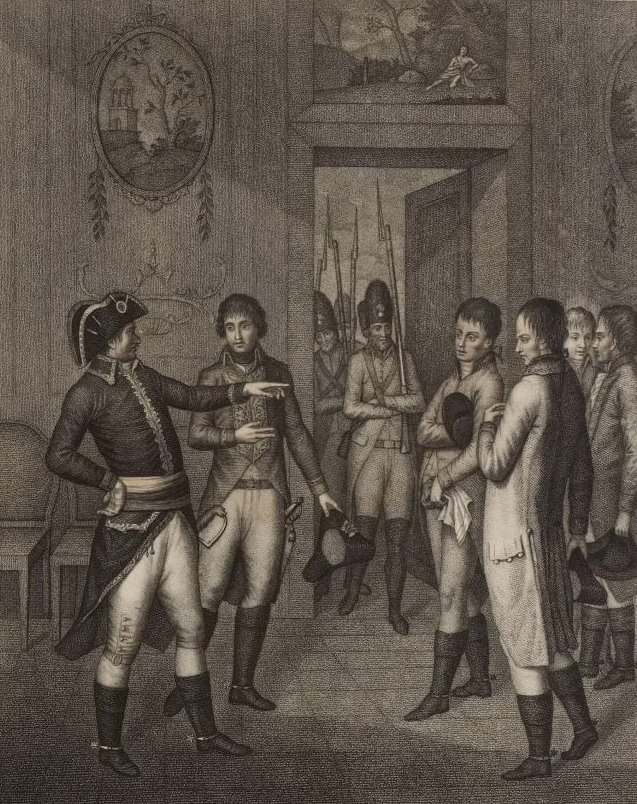
Dumouriez receiving Pierre Riel de Beurnonville and the four commissioners at Saint-Amand-les-Eaux in the afternoon of 2 April.

In March Dumouriez refused to obey a decree to make his way to Paris. A body of four commissioners was sent to Lille to question and arrest him. On 1 April 1793, Dumouriez asked Miaczinsky to arrest the four commissionaires, sent by the National Convention. On 2 April, Dumouriez sent him to Orchies and he had lunch with Saint-Georges and Thomas-Alexandre Dumas, then to Lille with 100 men cavalry to search for General Blaise Duval, to arrest the other commissioners/deputies and save the "treasure" (the bonds). The city of Lille was successfully defended by Saint-Georges against Miaczinsky. Miaczinsky was allowed to enter the city but his troops were forced to camp outside the walls. He was arrested on the evening of 2 April and accompanied to Paris on 11 April. Shortly thereafter, his wife and sons were arrested.

On 6 May, Miaczinsky was heard by the Revolutionary Tribunal headed by Jacques-Bernard-Marie Montané. Fouquier-Tinville the accusateur public asked to send Chevalier de Saint-Georges to witness. On 16 May De Miranda was interrogated (and temporarily released). On 17 May, the trial against General Miaczinsky started; Captain Colin was interrogated. Convicted on the same day, he was guillotined in the morning of 22 May at Place de la Révolution, screaming "Vive la République" on his way to the scaffold.

In 1800, his widow received an annuity from Napoleon, the First Consul.

== See also ==
- History of the Polish–Lithuanian Commonwealth (1764–1795)

== Sources ==
- JOZEF MYACHINSKY 1743-07-21 – 1793-05-22
- The Chevalier de Saint-Georges: Virtuoso of the Sword and the Bow by Gabriel Banat
- Mémoire à Nosseigneurs de l'Assemblée nationale, pour le comte de Miaczynski
