= Pierre August Lajard =

French minister (1757–1837)

Pierre Auguste Lajard (20 April 1757, Montpellier – 12 June 1837, Paris) was a Minister of War during the French Revolution.

Political offices
Preceded by Charles Dumouriez	Secretary of State for War; 16 June 1792 – July 1792	Succeeded by Charles Franqueville d'Abancourt
