= St. John the Baptist's Church, Lanckorona =

Church building in Lanckorona, Poland

Coordinates: 49°50′44″N 19°42′50″E

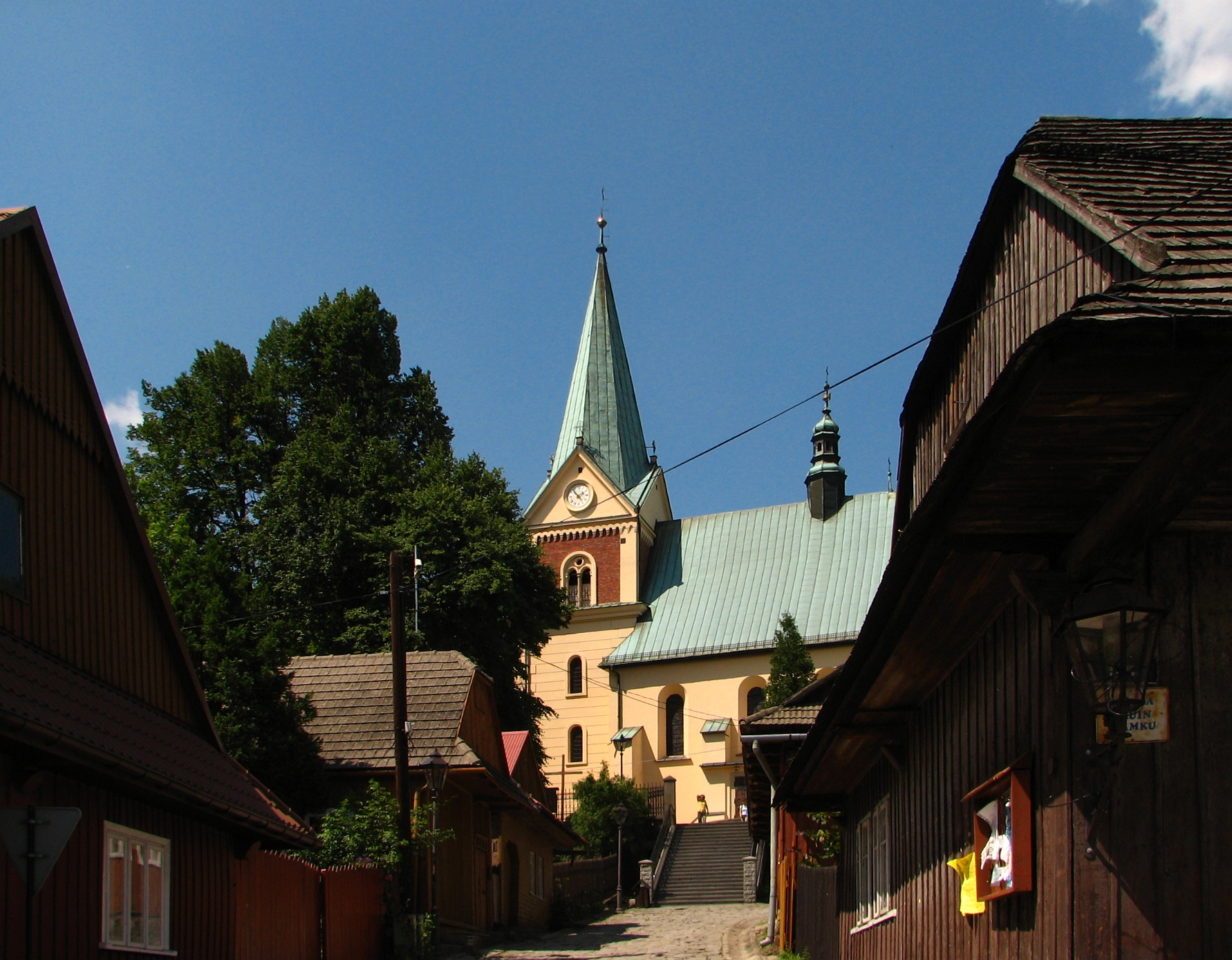
St. John the Baptist Roman Catholic Church in Lanckorona

Saint John the Baptist Church is a Catholic parish church in Lanckorona, Poland, erected in 1336.
