= Action of Tyniec Abbey =

War of the Bar Confederation engagement

Action of the Tyniec Abbey
- Part of the war of the Bar Confederation
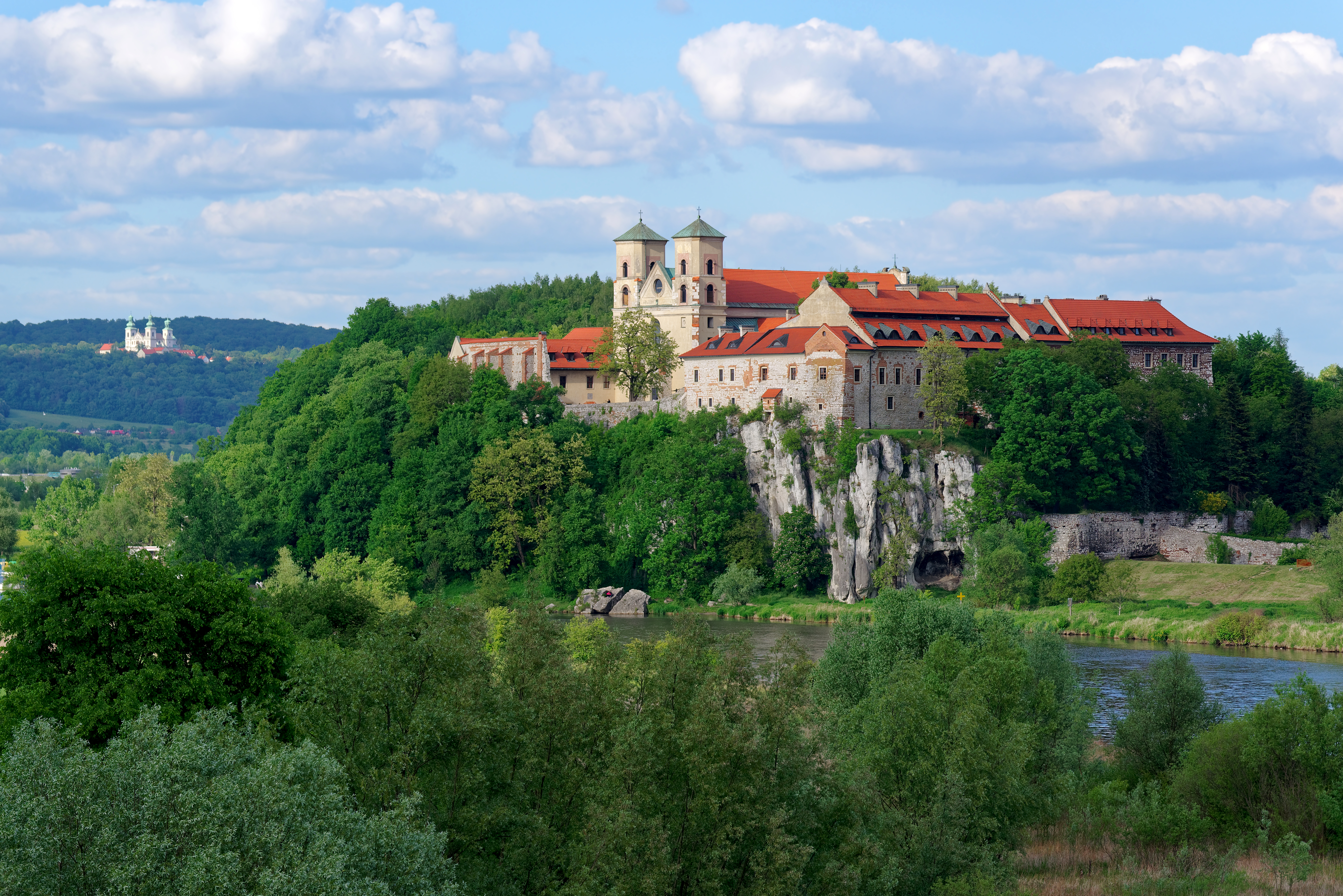
- View of the abbey
Date	May 20, 1771 (Note: Julian calendar/O.S.: May 9)
Location	Tyniec, Kraków Voivodeship 50°1′9.83″N 19°48′7.75″E
Result	Confederate victory
Territorial changes	Russian concentration at Lanckorona

Belligerents
Russia	Bar Confederation; Austrians; France

Commanders and leaders
(Russian Empire) Alexander Suvorov (Russian Empire) Pyotr Shepelev	(Kingdom of France) Charles François Dumouriez

Strength
3,600 (in all): Unknown number engaged	800 (in all): Unknown number engaged

Casualties and losses
90 dead and injured	100 dead, 75 prisoners of war, 2 cannons

The action of (the) Tyniec Abbey (Note: Or more simply, the action of Tyniec; Russian: Бой при монастыре Тынец, also Russian: Дело при монастыре Тынец – the latter is what Russian historian A. Petrov called this battle/combat/engagement, which represents the storming of the Tyniec Redoubt.) was an engagement between the armies of the Russian Empire and the Bar Confederation that took place on 20 May 1771. Russian Major-General Suvorov, in co-operation with Lieutenant-Colonel Shepelev's cavalry, assaulted Lieutenant-Colonel Dumouriez's army on a mountain redoubt fortified with a palisade, trous de loup, and two cannons; near the Tyniec Abbey, the village of Tyniec; but after taking the redoubt twice, they were twice repulsed, however, managed to capture all the cannons; Suvorov refused to retake the redoubt, and withdrew to meet Dumouriez, who had meanwhile brought reinforcements, in the third confrontation at Lanckorona. Almost all the infantry of the Tyniec consisted of recruited Austrian deserters. Thus, although he had numerical superiority, Suvorov was unable to take the high ground at Tyniec, which was moreover fortified and protected by the Vistula from the west. The latter advantage makes it difficult to fully encircle the redoubt.

== Sources ==
- Petrushevsky, Alexander (1884). Генералиссимус князь Суворов [Generalissimo Prince Suvorov] (in Russian). Vol. 1 (1st ed.). Saint Petersburg: Типография М. М. Стасюлевича.
- Petrov, Andrey N. (1874). Война России с Турцией и Польскими конфедератами. с 1769—1774 год [Russia's war with Turkey and the Polish confederates] (in Russian). Vol. III. St. Petersburg: Типография К. В. Трубникова.
