= Charles d'Abancourt =

French statesman, minister to Louis XVI (1758–1792)

Charles Xavier Joseph de Franque Ville d'Abancourt (4 July 1758 – 9 September 1792) was a French statesman, minister to Louis XVI.

== Biography ==
D'Abancourt was born in Douai, and was the nephew of Charles Alexandre de Calonne. He was Louis XVI's last minister of war (July 1792), and organised the defence of the Tuileries Palace during the 10 August attack. Commanded by the Legislative Assembly to send away the Swiss Guards, he refused, and was arrested for treason to the nation and sent to Orléans to be tried.

At the end of August the Assembly ordered Abancourt and the other prisoners at Orléans to be transferred to Paris with an escort commanded by Claude Fournier, nicknamed l'Americain. At Versailles they learned of the massacres at Paris. Abancourt and his fellow-prisoners were murdered in cold blood during the 9 September massacres (9 September 1792) at Versailles. Fournier was unjustly charged with complicity in the crime.

== Notes ==
Political offices
| Preceded by Pierre August Lajard | Secretary of State for War; 23 July 1792 – 10 August 1792 | Succeeded by Joseph Marie Servan de Gerbey |
