= Lanckorona Castle =

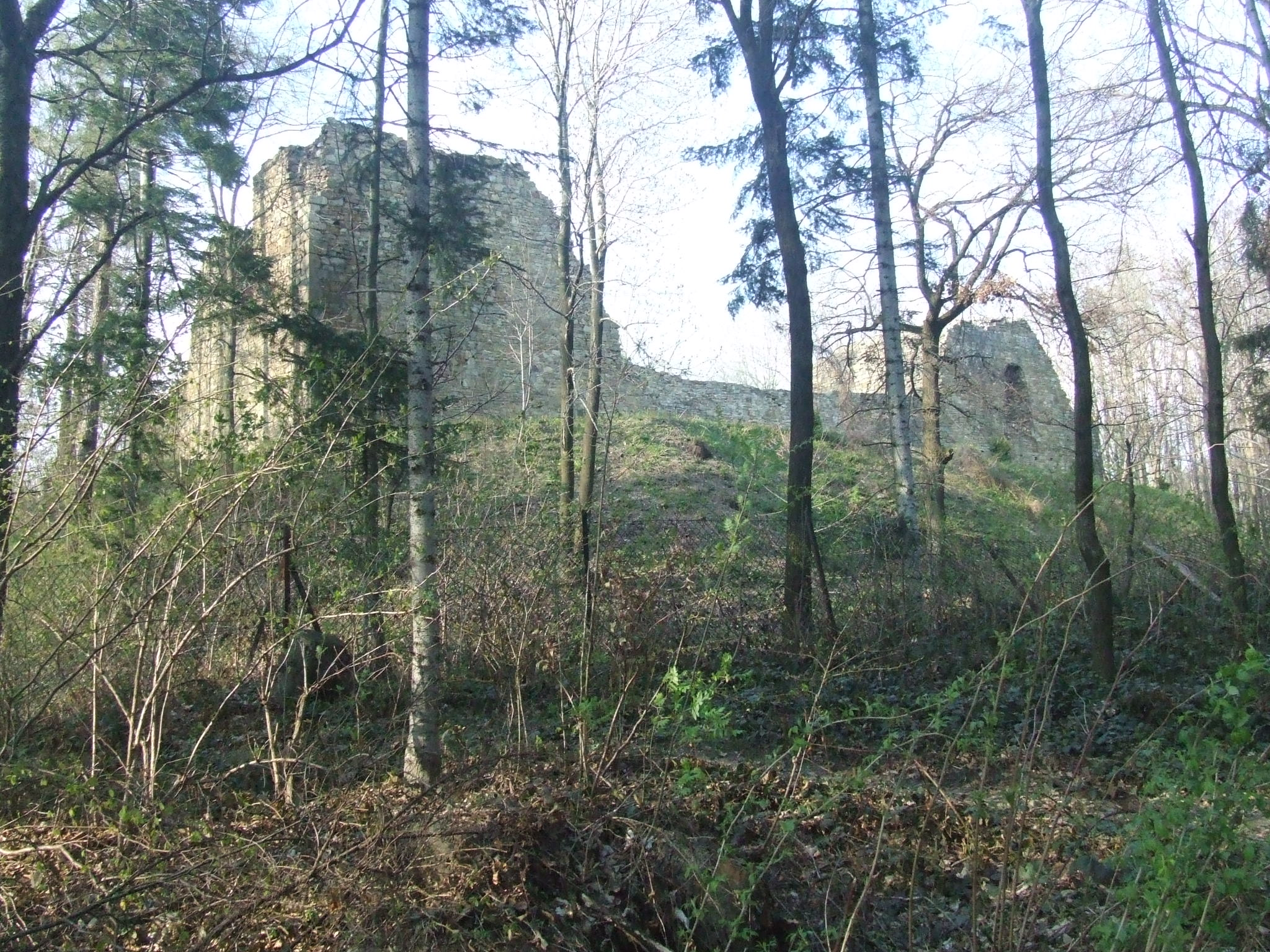
- Interactive map of the Lanckorona Castle area

General information
- Architectural style: Polish Gothic
- Location: Lanckorona, Poland
- Coordinates: 49.8478°N 19.7124°E
- Construction started: 14th century
- Completed: before 1330
- Demolished: 1655, 1771, 1870

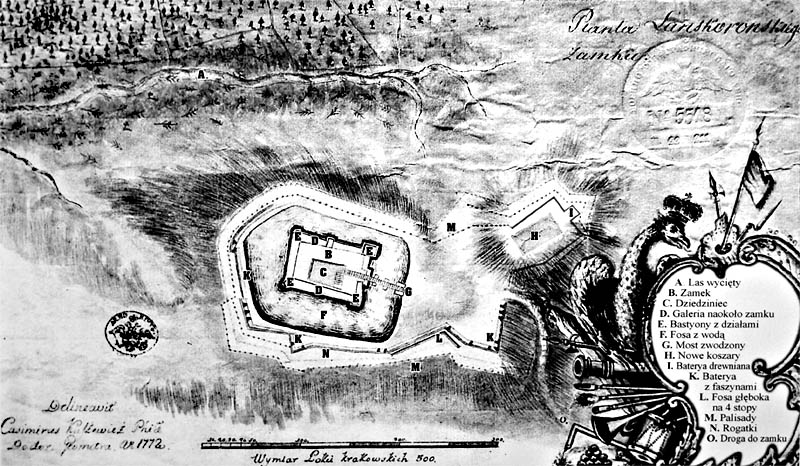
Castle Hill 1772

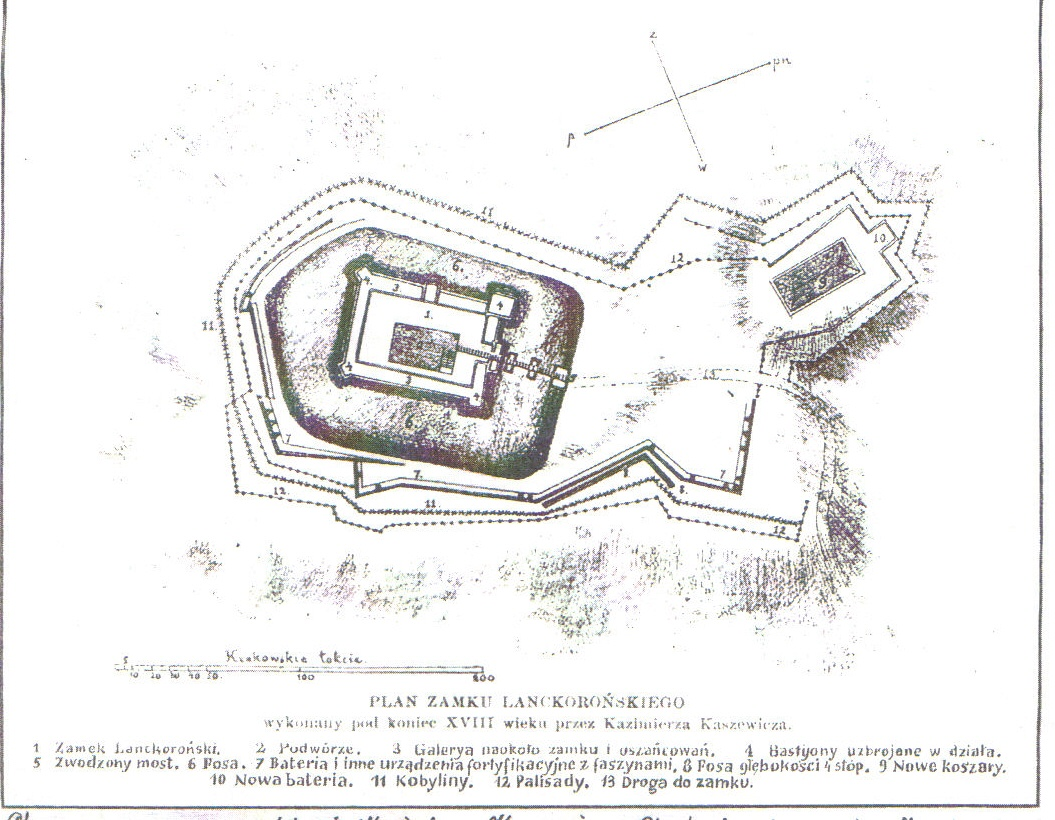
Layout of the Lanckorona Castle 1790

The Lanckorona Castle (Polish: Zamek w Lanckoronie) was built in the early 14th century in Lanckorona, Poland. It was damaged in several fires and during conflicts, especially in 1655 during the Swedish Deluge and Battles of Lanckorona in 1771. Jakub Derc led a peasant revolt and was killed in Lanckorona.

== History ==
As documented in the manuscripts of the chronicler and diplomat Jan Długosz, King Casimir III the Great erected the Lanckorona Castle to protect the road to Kraków and the border with the Duchy of Oświęcim.

The castle changed owners constantly, it served as the primary residence of the starosts of Lanckorona. During the reign of Stephen Báthory the castle passed to Kasper Biekisz and eventually ended up in the hands of Mikołaj Zebrzydowski in the 16th century.

The Zebrzydowski family remained the owners of the castle until the 18th century after which it was owned by the Czartoryski family and eventually the Wielopolski family until 6 June 1772 when Jozef Wielopolski lost it to the Austrian army when they occupied the castle.

== Castle design ==
The original stronghold from the Middle Ages had a rectangular shape and had two four-sided corner towers. The rectangular inner courtyard was closed-off from the northwest side of the castle by a living quarters. In the 18th century, after the castle was rebuilt, cannon bastions were located in the corners of the castle, and a drawbridge led to the main gate. In 1770, the Bar Confederation repaired and fortified the castle. With the help of French engineers, external earth fortifications were built including a tick-shaped fort.

== See also ==
- Bar Confederation

== Bibliography ==
- Władysław Konopczyński Bar Confederation (1936) ISBN 83-85218-07-6
