= Charles François Dumouriez =

French Army officer and politician (1739–1823)

Charles-François Dumouriez
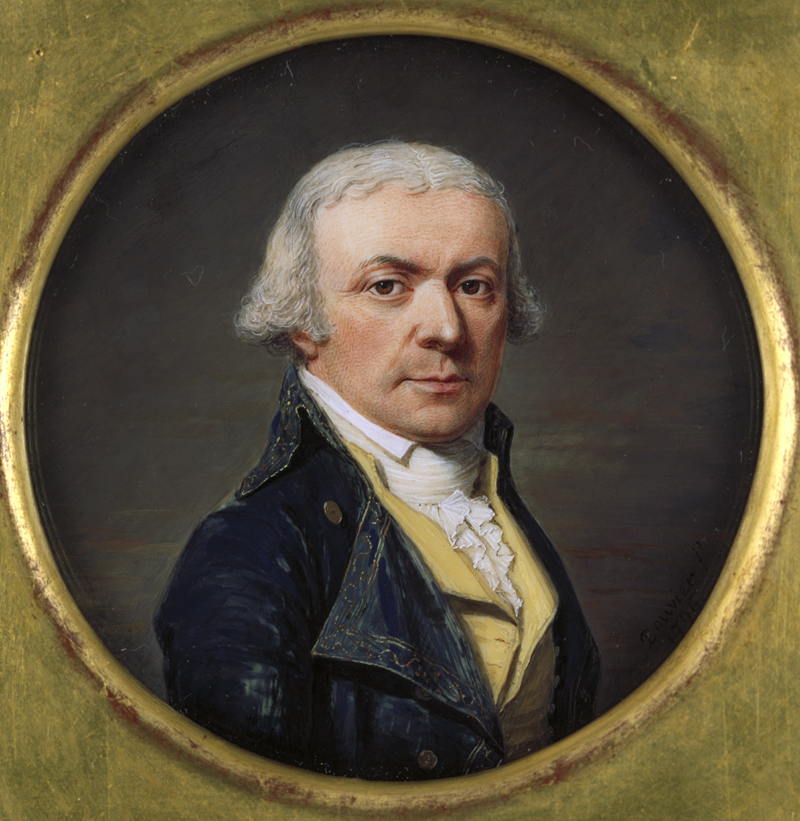
- Portrait by Pierre-Louis Bouvier, 1796–1797

Minister of Foreign Affairs
- In office 15 March 1792 – 13 June 1792
- Monarch: Louis XVI
- Preceded by: Claude Antoine de Valdec de Lessart
- Succeeded by: Pierre-Paul de Méredieu

Minister of War
- In office 13 June 1792 – 18 June 1792
- Preceded by: Joseph Marie Servan de Gerbey
- Succeeded by: Pierre August Lajard

Personal details
- Born: 26 January 1739 Cambrai, France
- Died: 14 March 1823 (aged 84) Turville, Buckinghamshire
- Resting place: Henley-on-Thames, Oxfordshire
- Occupation: Military officer; politician
- Awards: Order of Saint Louis; Names inscribed on the Arc de Triomphe

Military service
- Allegiance: Kingdom of France; French First Republic
- Branch/service: French Royal Army; French Revolutionary Army
- Years of service: 1758–1793
- Rank: Divisional general
- Battles/wars: Seven Years' War; French conquest of Corsica; War of the Bar Confederation; Action of Tyniec Abbey; Battle of Lanckorona; French Revolutionary Wars; Battle of Valmy; Flanders campaign; Battle of Jemappes; Battle of Tienen; Battle of Neerwinden

Divisional-General Charles-François du Périer Dumouriez (French: [ʃaʁl fʁɑ̃swa dy peʁje dymuʁje]; 26 January 1739 – 14 March 1823) was a French Army officer and politician who served as Minister of Foreign Affairs and Minister of War in the Constitutional Cabinet of Louis XVI. Born in Cambrai, Dumouriez joined the French Royal Army in 1757 and served with distinction in the Seven Years' War. Following a spell as a diplomat in Louis XV's Secret du Roi and brief imprisonment due to financial misconduct, he was named commandant of Cherbourg and oversaw the development of the port city.

At the outbreak of the French Revolution, Dumouriez went to Paris and joined the Jacobin Club. With the Girondins' support, he was appointed Minister of Foreign Affairs in 1792. He then briefly served as Minister of War but resigned due to conflict with Louis XVI, after which he assumed command of the Army of the North in its campaign against Austria and Prussia. Alongside François Christophe de Kellermann, he achieved a major victory at Valmy, forcing an invading Prussian army to withdraw.

Dumouriez then launched an invasion of the Austrian Netherlands and scored another victory at Jemappes. In early 1793, he advanced into the Dutch Republic but was driven back to the Austrian Netherlands before suffering a major defeat at Neerwinden. A monarchist at heart, Dumouriez had long disagreed with the direction the revolution had taken and was increasingly coming into conflict with radical deputies such as Maximilien Robespierre and Jean-Paul Marat. After Neerwinden, he attempted to march on Paris, overthrow the National Convention and restore the constitutional monarchy, but the plot was foiled and he subsequently defected to the Austrians. Dumouriez spent the rest of his life in exile, wandering through Europe until settling in England, where he died in 1823. His name is among the ones inscribed on the Arc de Triomphe, on Column 3.

== Early life and education ==
Dumouriez was born in Cambrai, on the Scheldt River in northern France, to parents of noble rank. His father, Antoine-François du Périer, served as a commissary of the royal army, and educated his son most carefully and widely. He continued his studies in Paris at the Lycée Louis-le-Grand, and was then sent to his uncle in Versailles for a year. In 1757 began his military career as a volunteer and served in six campaigns of the Seven Years' War. In the Battle of Rossbach, he served as a cornet in the Régiment d'Escars. He was stationed in Emden, Münster, Wesel and carried a small library with him. He received a commission for good conduct in action, with distinction (receiving 22 wounds during the battle of Corbach). In 1761 he recovered in the baths at Aachen. After the peace of Hubertusburg he retired at Abbeville as a captain, with a small pension (which was never paid), a love affair with his niece and the cross of St Louis.

Dumouriez then visited Italy, Spain and Corsica, and his memoranda to the duc de Choiseul on Corsican affairs at the time of the Corsican Republic led to his re-employment on the staff of the French expeditionary corps sent to the island, for which he gained the rank of lieutenant-colonel. In 1769 Choiseul gave Dumouriez a military command as deputy quartermaster general to the army under the Marquis de Chauvelin. After two campaigns on the island, he became a member of the Secret du Roi, the secret service under Louis XV, which gave full scope to his diplomatic skills. The fall of Choiseul (1770) brought about Dumouriez's recall. In 1770 he undertook a mission into Poland, where, in addition to his political business, he organized a Polish militia for the Bar Confederation. There he met with Jozef Miaczinsky, the commander of a regiment. His Polish soldiers were pushed back by the Russian forces of General Alexander Suvorov in the first clash but Suvorov failed in the second clash. On 21 May 1771, Dumouriez' Polish soldiers were smashed in the third clash.

In 1772, upon returning to Paris, Dumouriez sought a military position from the marquis de Monteynard, Secretary of State for War, who gave him a staff position with the regiment of Lorraine writing diplomatic and military reports. In 1773, he was arrested in Hamburg and then imprisoned in the Bastille for six months, apparently for diverting funds intended for the employment of secret agents into the payment of personal debts. During his captivity Dumouriez occupied himself with literary pursuits. He was sent to Caen, where he remained in detention until the accession of Louis XVI in 1774. Dumouriez was then recalled to Paris and assigned to posts in Lille and Boulogne-sur-Mer by the comte de Saint-Germain, the new king's Minister of War.

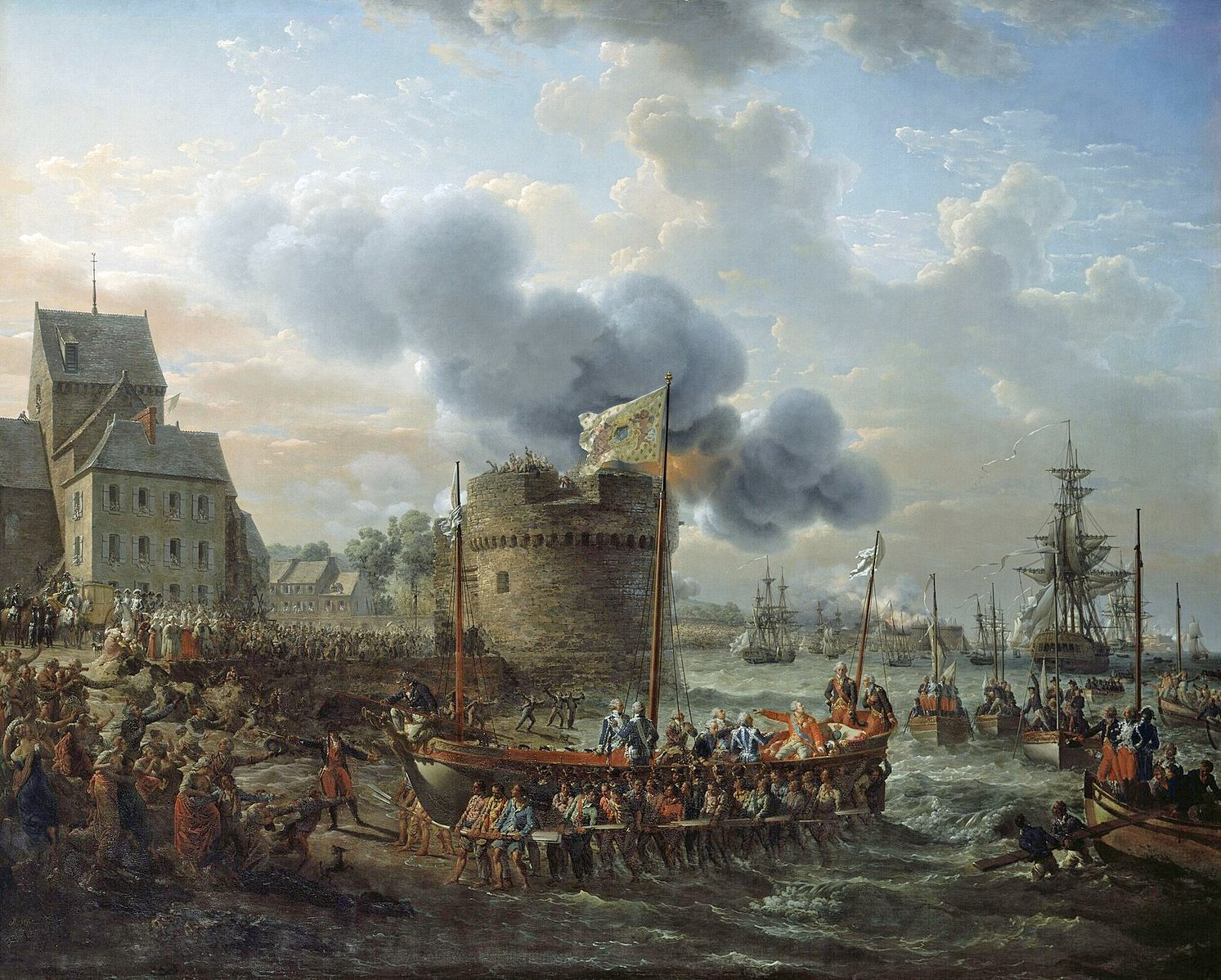
Louis XVI visiting the port of Cherbourg in June 1786

Upon his release, Dumouriez married his cousin, a certain Mademoiselle de Broissy. In the meantime, Dumouriez had turned his attention to the internal state of his own country, and amongst the very numerous memoranda which he sent to the government was a project on the defence of Normandy and Cherbourg navy port, which procured for him in 1778 the post of commandant of Cherbourg. He administered it with much success for more than ten years. The construction of the fortifications and dikes began in 1779/1782 and extended in 1786. He used a plan by Vauban to create an outer port. The city grew and even the King came to La Manche see it. For his ingenuity in fortifying he became a maréchal de camp in 1788. After the Storming of the Bastille he became commander of the National Guard in July 1789, but his ambition was not satisfied. Business and trade dropped in Cherbourg. He proved a neglectful and unfaithful husband, and the couple separated. Madame Dumouriez took refuge in a convent.

== Political career ==
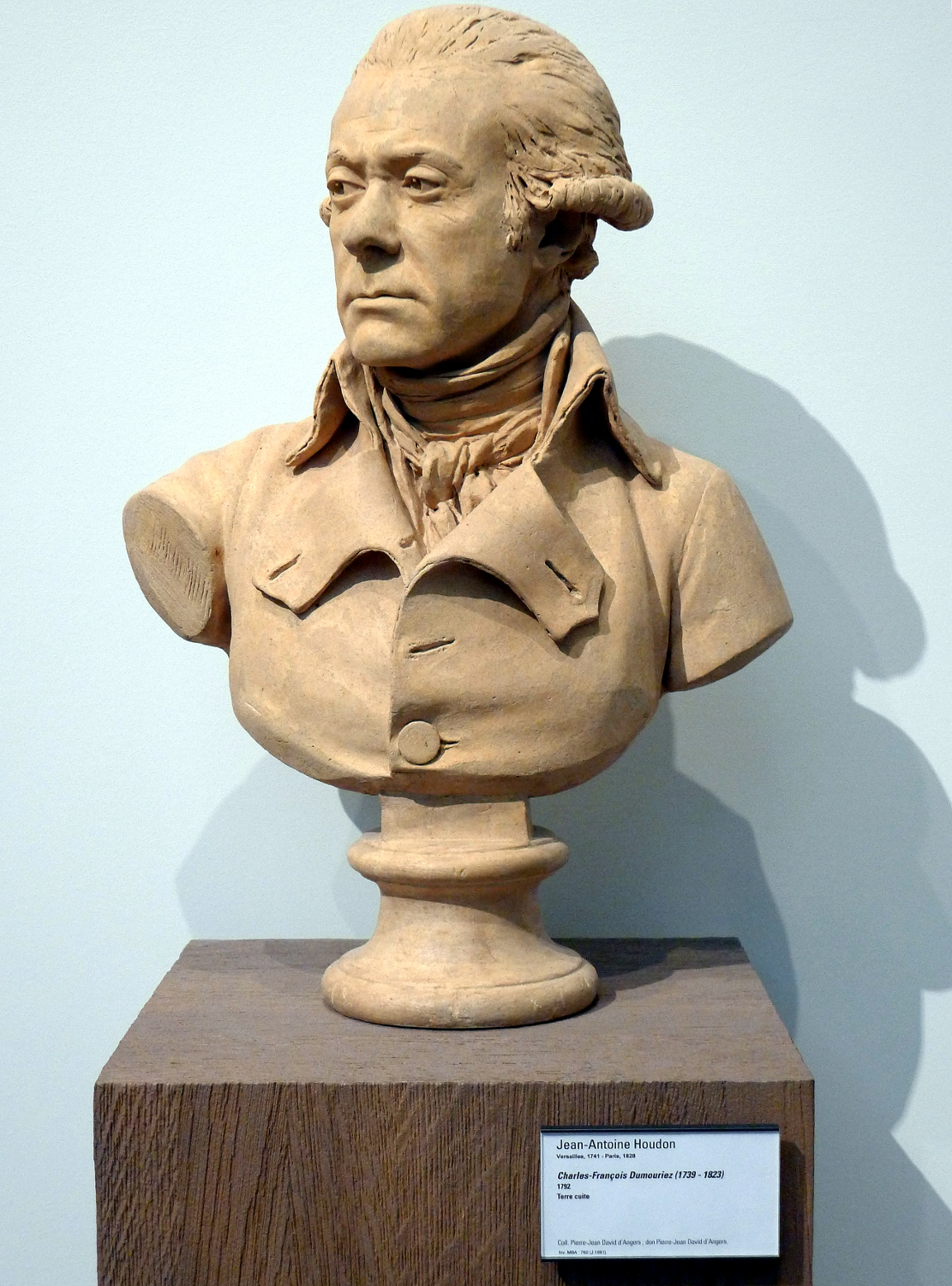
1792 bust of Dumouriez by Houdon

At the outbreak of the Revolution, seeing the opportunity for carving out a new career, he went to Paris, where he joined the Jacobin Club. In 1790, Dumouriez was appointed French military advisor to the newly established United Belgium States and remained dedicated to the cause of an independent Belgian Republic. In 1791 he was sent to the coast. The death of Mirabeau, to whose fortunes he had attached himself, proved a great blow. However, opportunity arose again when, in his capacity as a lieutenant-general and the commandant of Nantes, he offered to march to the assistance of the National Constituent Assembly after the royal family's unsuccessful flight to Varennes. Minister of War, Louis Lebègue Duportail, promoted Dumouriez from president of the War Council to major-general in June 1791 and attached him to the Twelfth Division, which was commanded by General Jacques Alexis de Verteuil.

Dumouriez then attached himself to the Girondist party and on 15 March 1792 was appointed the Minister of Foreign Affairs. In March 1792 he selected Pierre Henri Hélène Marie Lebrun-Tondu as his first officer for Belgian and Liégeois affairs. The relationship between the Girondists and Dumouriez was not based on ideology, but rather based on the practical benefit it gave to both parties. Dumouriez needed people in the Legislative Assembly to support him, and the Girondists needed a general to give them legitimacy in the army. He played a major part in the declaration of war against Austria (20 April), and he ordered General Dillon, commander of Lille, to attack Tournai, and the invasion of the Austrian Netherlands. His foreign policy was greatly influenced by Jean-Louis Favier. Favier had called for France to break its ties with Austria.

On the king's dismissal of Roland, Clavière and Servan (13 June 1792), he took Servan's post of Minister of War, but resigned it a few days later on account of Louis XVI's refusal to come to terms with the National Constituent Assembly, concerning his suspensive veto. Within a week he joined the army of the North under Marshal Luckner. After the émeute of 10 August 1792 and Lafayette’s flight, he gained appointment to the command of the "Army of the Centre". At the same moment, France's enemies assumed the offensive. Dumouriez acted promptly from Sedan, Ardennes.

On 24 August 1792 Dumouriez wrote to his ally General François Kellermann about the void in military power within France. Within this letter, Dumouriez voices his opinions adamantly that Lafayette was a "traitor" to France after being arrested for mobilizing his army from the borders of France to Paris to protect the Royal family from revolutionaries who were dissatisfied with the monarchy of France at the time. Within this letter, Dumouriez's attachment to the Jacobin club is explicitly present as he tells Kellermann that the army was finally "purged of aristocrats". Dumouriez's loyalty to France's military which was evident within this letter was instrumental to him ascending to his future position of Minister of Foreign Affairs from March 1792 to June 1792, restoring the natural borders of France. Dumouriez outmaneuvered the invading forces of the Duke of Brunswick in the forest of Argonne. His subordinate Kellermann repulsed the Prussians at Valmy (20 September 1792). After these military victories, Dumouriez was ready to invade Belgium to spread revolution in the Flanders campaign.

== Military career ==
=== Army of the North ===
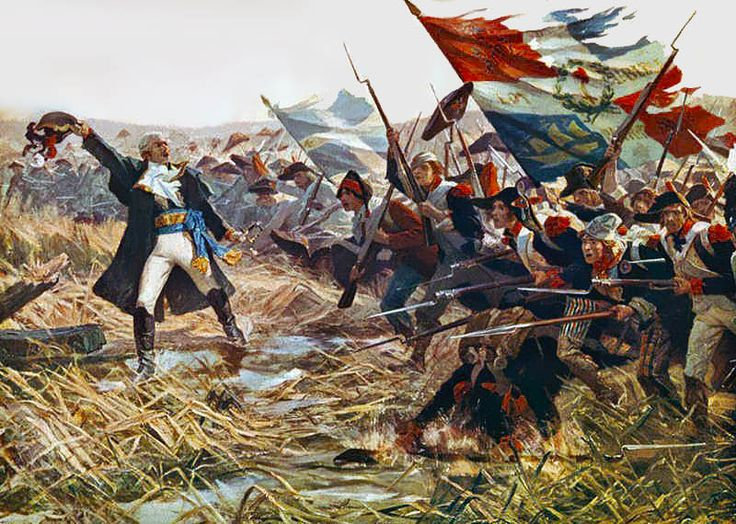
The Battle of Jemmapes

Supported by minister Lebrun-Tondu, he declared in the National Convention on 12 October that he would liberate the Belgians and the Liège people. On 27 October 1792, he invaded the Austrian Netherlands. Dumouriez himself severely defeated the Austrians at Jemappes (6 November 1792). He became a military hero for this decisive victory, for which the newspaper "Révolutions de Paris" proclaimed him the liberator of the Belgians. On 14 November, Dumouriez entered Brussels. He also met representatives of the exiled Dutch Patriots, who hoped that a French invasion of the United Provinces would provoke a revolution against stadtholder William V. Among the Dutch revolutionaries who established themselves in Antwerp were Jean Conrad de Kock, Daendels and his associates.

Dumouriez increasingly opposed the Convention's policies in the occupied Austrian Netherlands. He opposed the Decree of 15 December 1792, which imposed revolutionary reforms on occupied territories and provided for the confiscation of property belonging to the former authorities and privileged corporations and the introduction of assignats. Dumouriez argued that these measures, together with the inadequate provisioning of his army, alienated the Belgian population and undermined his plans for the establishment of an independent Belgian republic.

Dumouriez's plans for the Dutch Republic were already attracting political criticism in Paris. On 27 December 1792, Jean-Paul Marat criticized his insistence on invading the Dutch Republic and linked it, speculatively, to the political ambitions of the House of Orléans.

== Flanders campaign ==
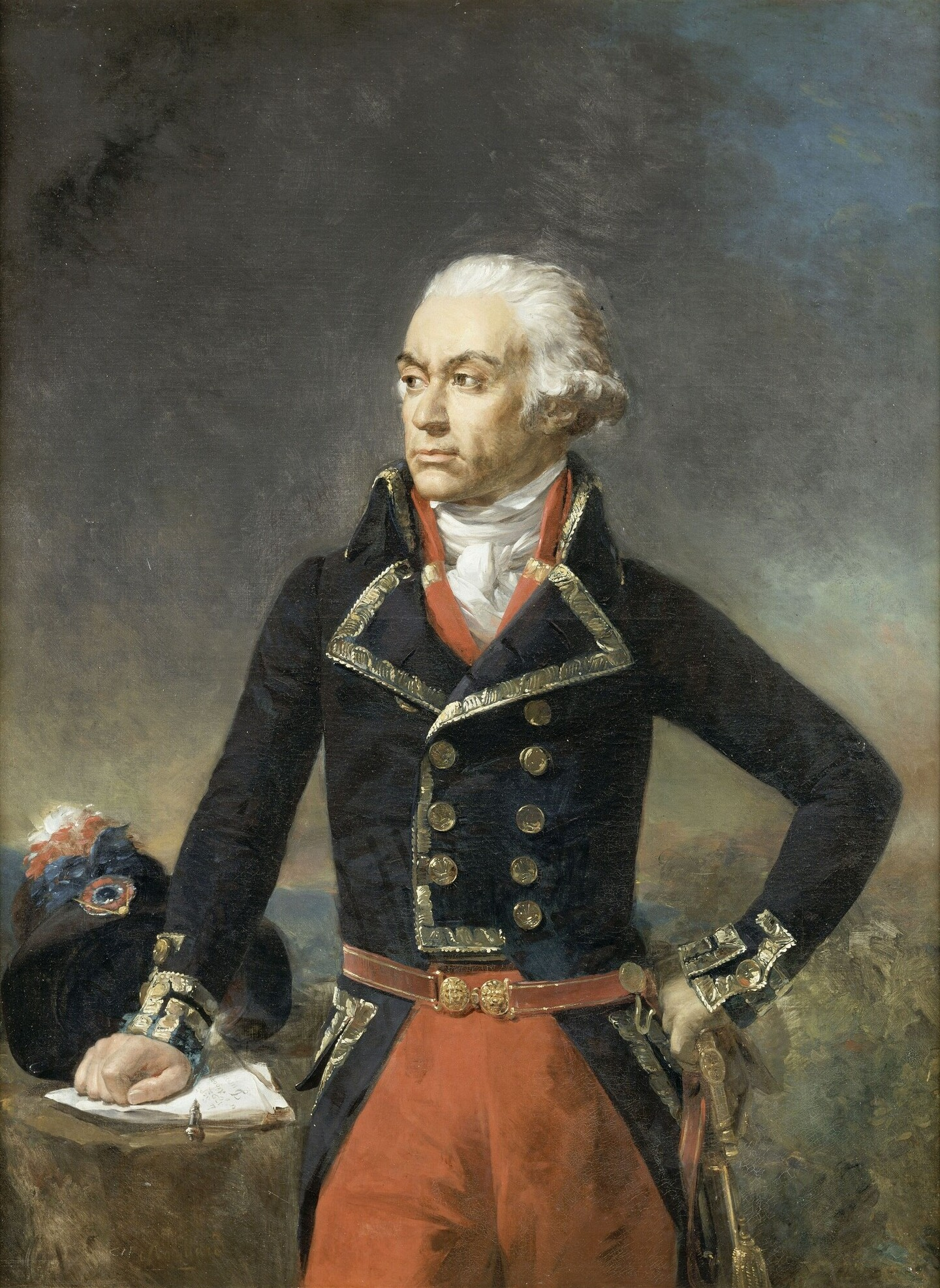
1834 portrait of Dumouriez as commander-in-chief of the Army of the North

Dumouriez returned to Paris on 1 January 1793, where he received a public ovation but encountered growing opposition to his policies within the revolutionary government. On 12 January he met foreign minister Lebrun-Tondu to discuss the projected invasion of the Dutch Republic. The expedition was postponed while negotiations with Dutch representatives continued. Dumouriez also became increasingly involved in disputes over the conduct and provisioning of the army. With support from the Girondins, he pressed for the dismissal of Minister of War Jean-Nicolas Pache, whom he blamed for failures in supplying his troops; Pache resigned in early February 1793.

On 1 February 1793, the National Convention declared war on the King of Great Britain and the stadtholder of the Dutch Republic, rather than on the British and Dutch peoples themselves. Dumouriez, who had long advocated an invasion of the Dutch Republic in cooperation with exiled Dutch Patriots, was given command of the campaign. On 3 February, before the invasion began, Marat criticized Dumouriez's plans in his Journal de la République française. On 17 February French forces and the Batavian Legion crossed the Dutch frontier. While other French forces advanced towards Maastricht, Dumouriez moved north with Daendels and occupied Breda, Klundert and Geertruidenberg.

The campaign was interrupted by an Austrian counter-offensive in the Austrian Netherlands. After French forces lost Aachen and Liège and were forced to abandon the siege of Maastricht in early March, Dumouriez was ordered to leave the Dutch campaign and return to the Austrian Netherlands.

On 11 March, Dumouriez addressed the Brussels assembly and apologized for abuses committed by French commissioners and soldiers. He promised to release Belgians who had been arbitrarily arrested, free the hostages and restore property confiscated from Belgian churches. The following day he wrote to the National Convention defending these measures as necessary to restore order and preserve Belgian support for France. He blamed the poor condition of his army on former war minister Jean-Nicolas Pache and accused the French commissioners in Belgium of abuses that had alienated the population and contributed to the insurrection. The military reverses coincided with growing unrest in Belgium, where French occupation policies had alienated parts of the population.

After returning to the Austrian Netherlands, Dumouriez concentrated his forces near Louvain and prepared to resume the offensive against the Austrian army under Prince Josias of Saxe-Coburg-Saalfeld. On 18 March the French attacked at the Battle of Neerwinden. Dumouriez's right wing and centre fought the Austrians throughout the day, while the left wing under Francisco de Miranda was defeated by Archduke Charles and retreated towards Tirlemont. The French army withdrew to Louvain the following day.

Immediately after the battle, Dumouriez blamed the retreat of Miranda's left wing for the defeat. When Danton and Delacroix, sent by the Convention, arrived at his headquarters on 21 March, Dumouriez refused to retract his letter of 12 March or apologize for his actions in the Austrian Netherlands. With his army retreating and increasingly affected by desertion and indiscipline, Dumouriez opened negotiations with the Austrians. On 22 March he sent his aide-de-camp Montjoye to Coburg's headquarters to negotiate a suspension of hostilities. The resulting tacit ceasefire allowed the French army to continue its retreat through Brussels.

On 25 March, Dumouriez met the Austrian chief of staff Karl Mack von Leiberich and negotiated an agreement under which the Austrians would halt their advance while the French evacuated the Austrian Netherlands. During these negotiations Dumouriez disclosed his intention to march his army on Paris, dissolve the National Convention, restore the French Constitution of 1791 and the constitutional monarchy, and negotiate peace with the coalition. He sought the support of the Duke of Chartres and his other senior officers for this plan.

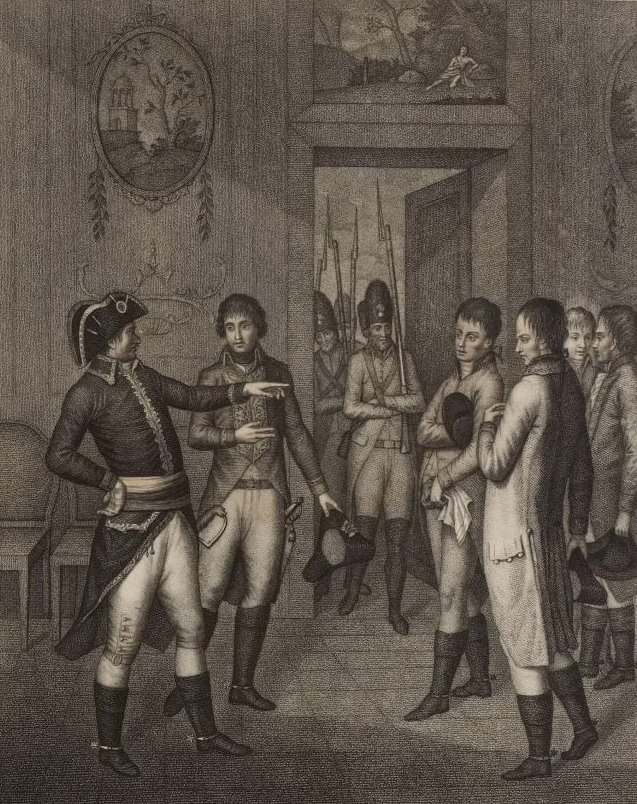
Dumouriez receiving Beurnonville and the four commissioners at Saint-Amand-les-Eaux on 2 April 1793

In Paris, Dumouriez's conduct increasingly aroused suspicion. On 26 March, Robespierre called for his removal from command, accusing him of having acted as a dictator in Belgium. Dumouriez nevertheless continued his negotiations with the Austrians and, in letters to Minister of War Marquis de Beurnonville, made increasingly open threats of political action against the Convention. On 30 March, the Convention ordered Dumouriez and his staff to be arrested and sent Beurnonville and four deputies to his headquarters at Saint-Amand.

When the delegation arrived on 1 April and attempted to arrest him, Dumouriez instead had Beurnonville and the four deputies arrested and handed them over to the Austrians. He then openly called on his army to march against the Convention and restore the Constitution of 1791. His attempt to secure the support of the frontier fortresses and the Army of the North failed, however, as commanders and troops increasingly declared their loyalty to the Republic. Unable to rally the army behind him, Dumouriez's attempt to overthrow the Convention collapsed.

=== Dumouriez' defection ===
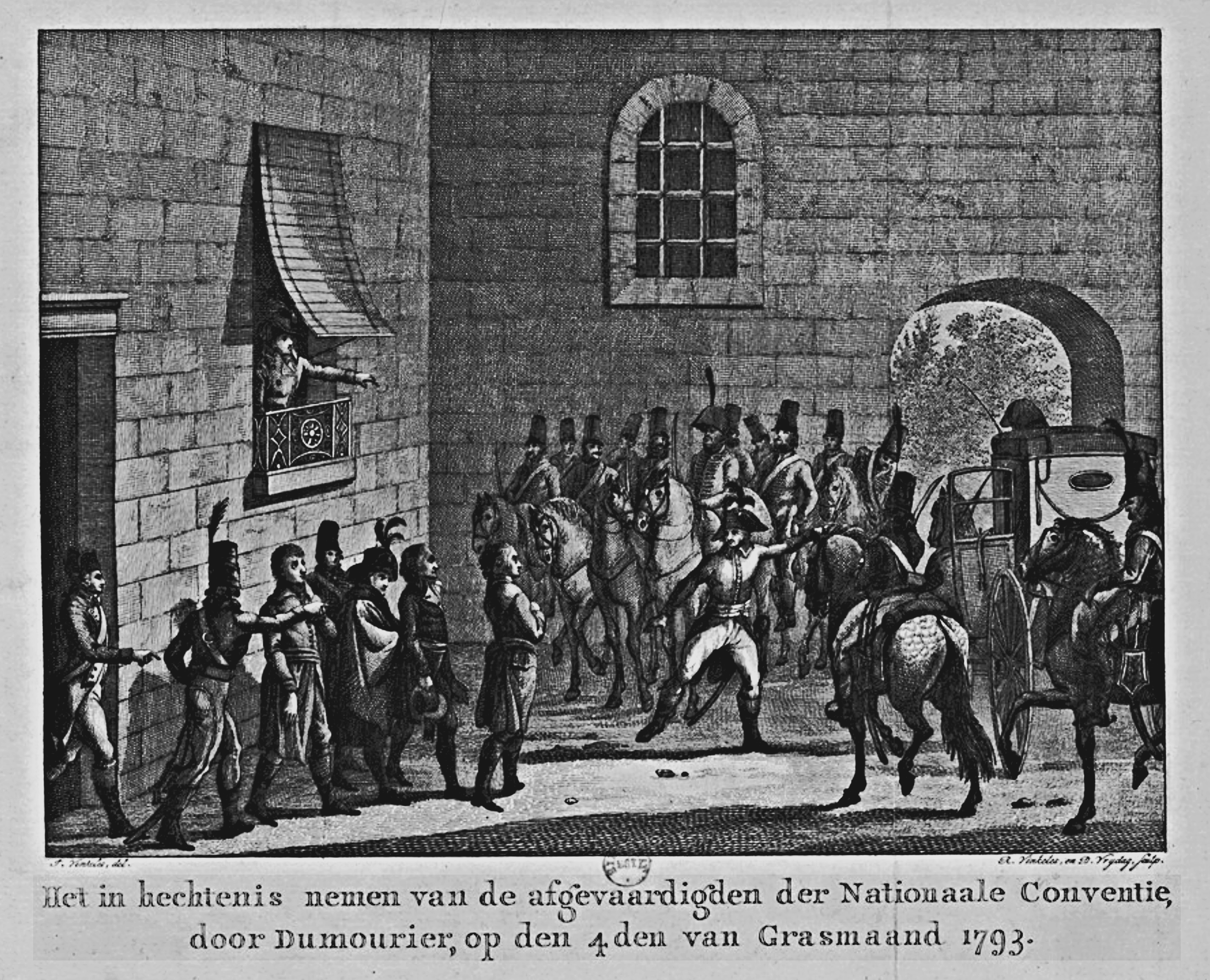
Dumouriez sending the arrested commissioners to Tournai

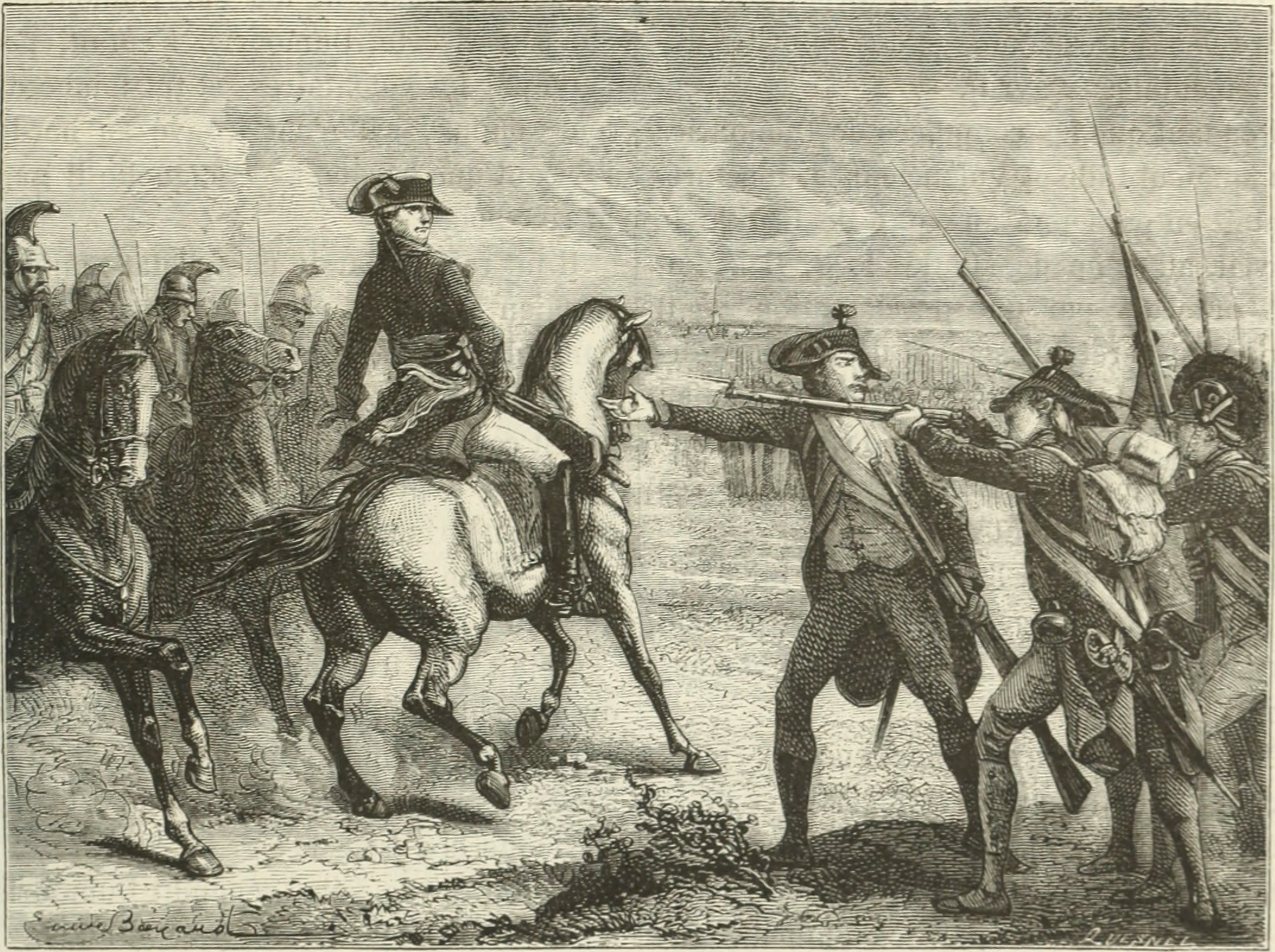
The defection of Dumouriez

Dumouriez still attempted to rally the Army of the North and secure the frontier fortresses for a march on Paris. On 2 April, General Jozef Miaczinsky, whom Dumouriez had sent to secure Lille, was refused entry to the city and arrested. Other commanders and troops also refused to support Dumouriez.

On 3 April, Robespierre accused Dumouriez and Brissot before the Convention of having conspired to overthrow the Republic. The following day the Convention declared Dumouriez a traitor and outlaw and placed a price on his head. Davout's volunteer battalion subsequently attempted to arrest him.

Unable to rally the army behind him, Dumouriez crossed over to the Austrian lines on 5 April 1793. He was accompanied by his chief of staff Pierre Thouvenot, the Duke of Chartres, and the Duke of Montpensier. His defection had immediate political consequences in Paris. His previous association with the Girondins provided the Montagnards with a powerful argument against Brissot and his allies; Robespierre later emphasized Dumouriez's close association with the Girondin Armand Gensonné.

On 5 April the Jacobin Club sent a circular to affiliated clubs throughout France calling for petitions demanding the expulsion from the Convention of deputies who had attempted to save Louis XVI. On 6 April the Committee of Public Safety was established. Suspicion also fell on Philippe Égalité, whose eldest son, the Duke of Chartres, had defected with Dumouriez.

In Brussels Dumouriez met Franz Georg Karl von Metternich, Austrian minister plenipotentiary for the Austrian Netherlands and father of Klemens von Metternich, and received a passport for Germany. On 10 April Robespierre again attacked Dumouriez, accusing him and his supporters of having harmed French finances by preventing the circulation of assignats in Belgium.

== Later life and death ==
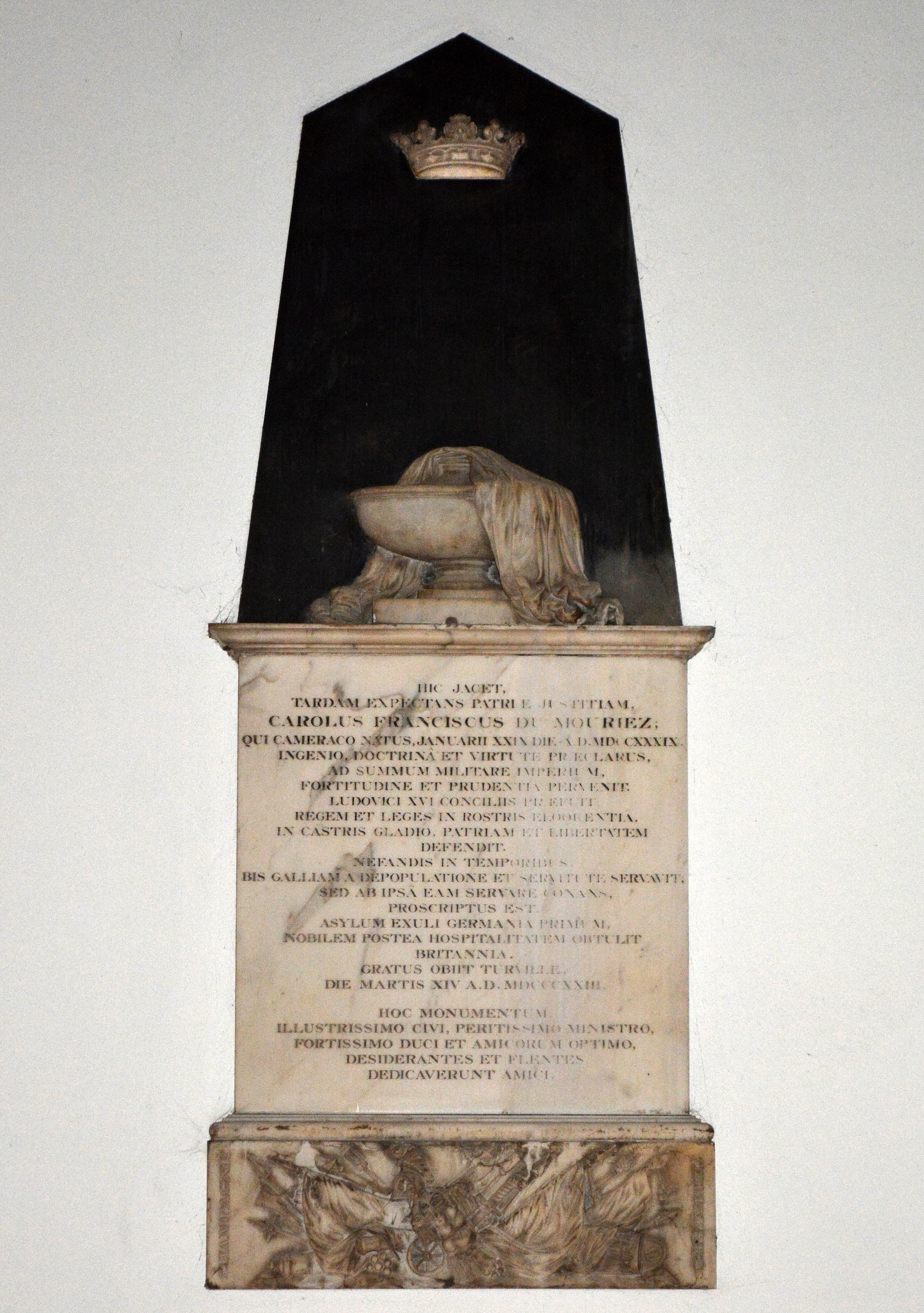
Dumouriez's funerary monument in St Mary the Virgin church in Henley-on-Thames

Following his defection on 5 April 1793, Dumouriez remained in Brussels for a short time, and then travelled to Cologne, seeking a position at the elector's court. He soon learned he had become an object of suspicion among his countrymen, the royal houses, aristocracies, and clergy of Europe. In response, Dumouriez wrote and published in Hamburg (1794) a first volume of memoirs in which he offered his version of the previous year's events. He became a royalist intriguer during the reign of Napoleon as well as an adviser to the British government. Dumouriez wrote political pamphlets and letters analyzing the coastal defence of England and Ireland.

Dumouriez now wandered from country to country, occupied in ceaseless royalist intrigues, until 1804 when he settled in England, where the British government granted him a pension. He became a valuable adviser to the British War Office, and the Duke of York and Albany in his struggle against Napoleon's planned invasion of the United Kingdom, and the British anti-invasion preparations of 1803–05.

In 1808 Dumouriez argued to Lord Castlereagh that "the best policy England could adopt with respect to colonies in Spanish America was to relinquish all ideas of military conquest and instead support the emancipation of the territories". Furthermore, Dumouriez suggested that once South America gained independence from Spanish rule, a constitutional monarchy should be established there with the exiled Duke of Orleans as King.

In 1814 and 1815, he endeavoured to procure from Louis XVIII the baton of a marshal of France, but failed to do so. He died at Turville Park, near Henley-on-Thames, on 14 March 1823. An enlarged edition, La Vie et les mémoires du Général Dumouriez, appeared at Paris in 1823.

== Sources ==
- Patricia Chastain Howe (2008) Foreign Policy and the French Revolution. Charles- François Dumouriez, Pierre LeBrun, and the Belgian Plan, 1789–1793.
- J.M. Thompson (1929) Leaders of the French Revolution: Dumouriez, p. 200-216.
- Banat, Gabriel (2006). The Chevalier de Saint-Georges: Virtuoso of the Sword and the Bow. Hillsdale, New York: Pendragon Press. ISBN 978-1-57647-109-8. OCLC 63703876.

Political offices
Preceded by Claude Antoine de Valdec de Lessart	Minister of Foreign Affairs; 12/15 March 1792 – 12 June 1792	Succeeded by Pierre-Paul de Méredieu
Preceded by Joseph Marie Servan de Gerbey	Secretaries of State for War; 13 June 1792 – 18 June 1792	Succeeded by Pierre August Lajard
