= Lanckorona =

Town in Poland

- Village
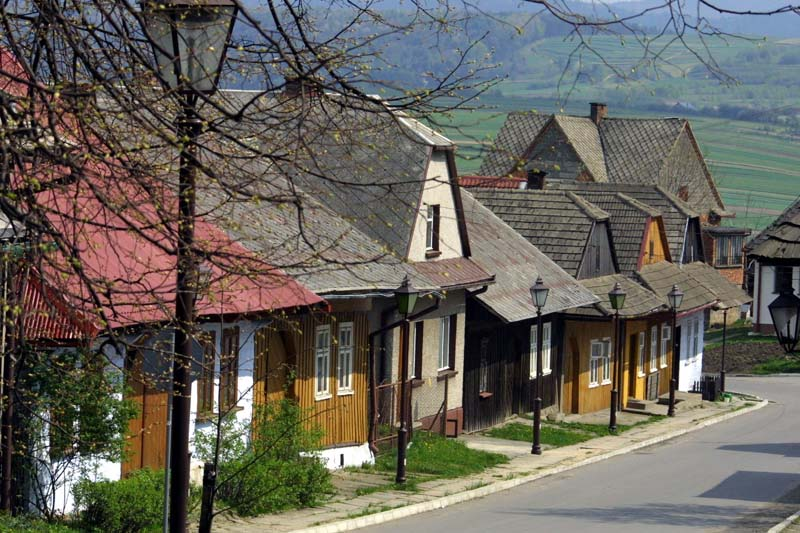

- Location within Poland
- Coordinates: 49°50′47″N 19°42′54″E
- Country: Poland
- Voivodeship: Lesser Poland
- County: Wadowice
- Gmina: Lanckorona
- Website: www.lanckorona.pl

Lanckorona [lant͡skɔˈrɔna] is a village located in Lesser Poland. It lies on the Skawinka river, among the hills of the Beskids, 545 m (1,788 ft) above sea level. It is known for the Lanckorona Castle, today in ruins. Lanckorona is also known for the Battle of the Bar Confederation that took place at the castle and within a 4 km (2 mi) range south of the town borders on 22 February 1771. In recent years, Lanckorona has become a tourist attraction for the well preserved 19th century wooden houses in its centre. The township of Lanckorona was established by Casimir III the Great in 1336, to protect the road to Kraków, following the creation of new regional borders following the homage given by Mieszko I, Duke of Cieszyn to Wenceslaus II of Bohemia in 1291. Lanckorona lost its town rights on 13 July 1933 as its population declined.

== History ==
As documented by Jan Długosz, the chronicler and diplomat, in his manuscripts, Casimir III the Great had erected the Lanckorona Castle to protect the road to Kraków and its borders with the Duchy of Oświęcim. The castle was already standing at the time of the erection of Saint John the Baptist Roman Catholic Parish Church of Lanckorona in 1336. In its Township Act, King Casimir III the Great gave its inhabitants the right to hold a weekly Thursday town marketplace as well as a concession to import beer into the town. At the time, the dwellers of Lanckorona enjoyed the same rights as the inhabitants of its much larger neighbouring Capital City of Kraków.

Two of the main battles of the Bar Confederation, a league of Polish nobles and gentry formed to defend the liberties of the nobility and the independence of Poland from Russian encroachment, took place on the plains before Lanckorona. On 22 February 1771, the Bar Confederates defended Lanckorona and its castle from the Russian army led by Alexander Suvorov.

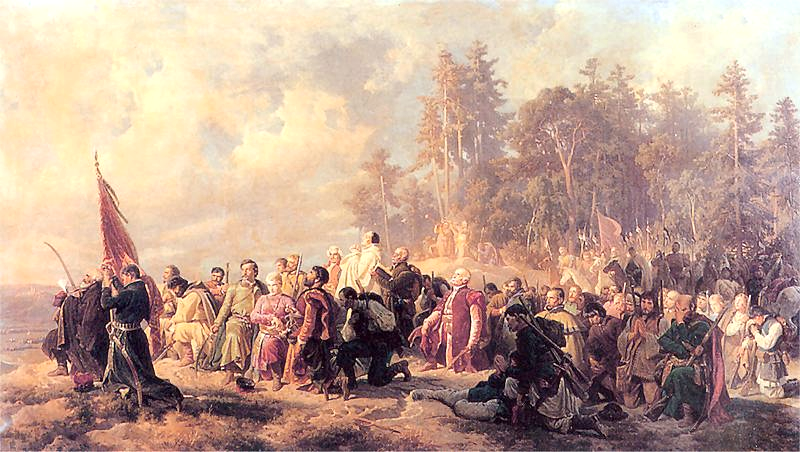
Prayer of the Army before the Battle of the Bar Confederation at Lanckorona

In 1602, Mikołaj Zebrzydowski the Voivode of Kraków and Lanckorona commissioned the construction of the Kalwaria Zebrzydowska monastery and the trails of the Passion of Christ in the neighbouring town of Kalwaria Zebrzydowska modeled on the Calvary outside the city walls of Jerusalem.

Lanckorona points of interest
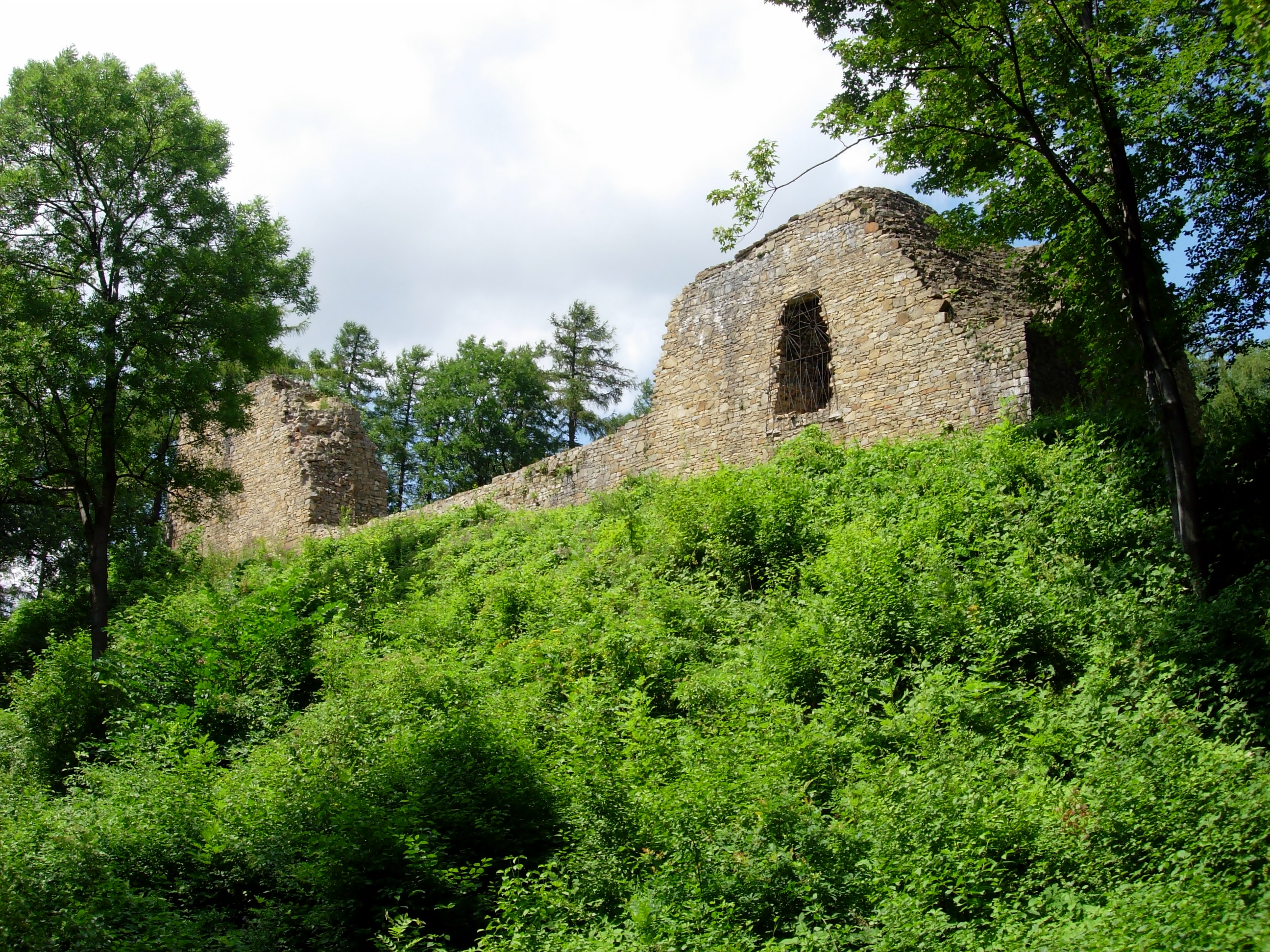
Picturesque ruins of Lanckorona Castle constructed in 1336, defended in 1771

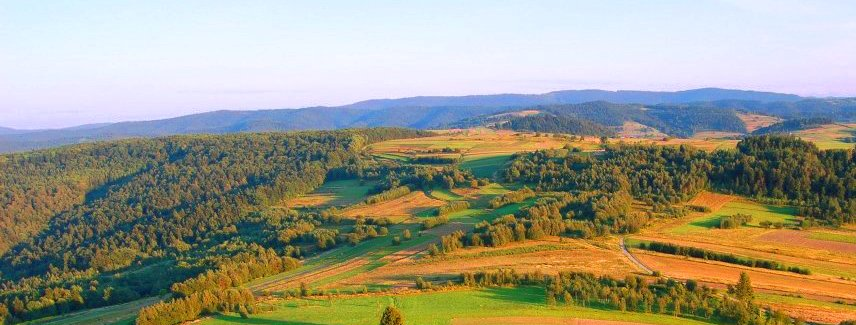
View from Lanckorona toward the battlefield of the Battle of the Bar Confederation

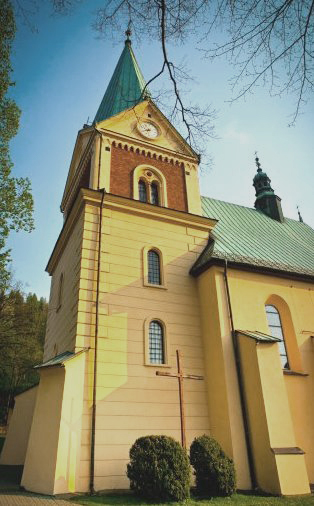
Parish Church in Lanckorona founded by Casimir III the Great in 1336
