= Trou de loup =

Type of booby trap

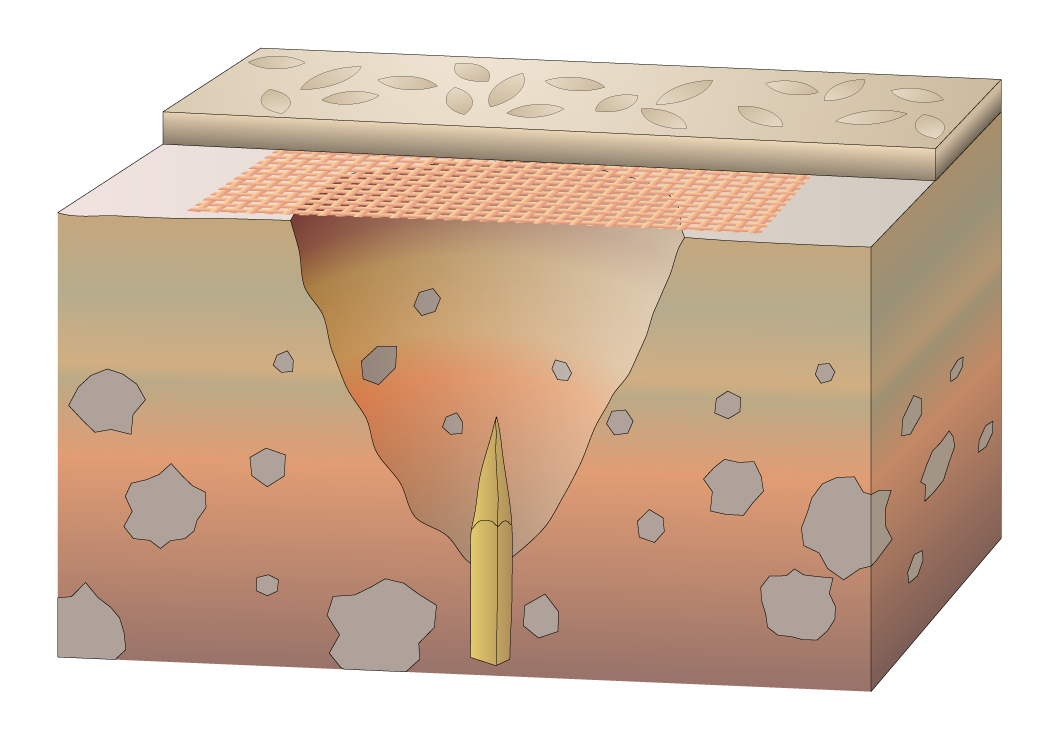
A diagrammatic example of a common trou de loup

In medieval fortification, a trou de loup (French: [tʁu d(ə) lu], lit. 'wolf hole'; plural trous de loup, also commonly referred to as a tiger pit in the East) was a type of booby trap or defensive obstacle. Each trou de loup consisted of a conical pit about 2 m (6 ft 7 in) deep and 1.2 to 2 m (3 ft 11 in to 6 ft 7 in) wide at the top. At the bottom of the pit, a sharpened punji stick (wooden stake) would be hammered in. In some cases, the pit was concealed by light cover of wicker and a layer of soil.

Trous de loup might be found singly as a trap (in which case they were always concealed), or in a dense pattern with no gaps between pits, used as an obstacle in front of a defended position.

A field of trous de loup could be made more effective if subsequently flooded to a shallow depth, which would conceal the pits, make their sides slippery, and add the risk of drowning.

== History ==
Even though the term has a medieval origin, this kind of device was first described by Julius Caesar, in the seventh book of his Commentarii de Bello Gallico (Commentaries on the Gallic Wars), who employed the device during the siege of Alesia. Caesar writes they were called lilies for their resemblance to the flower of the same name. Later Roman examples can be seen at Rough Castle on the Antonine Wall in Great Britain.
