= Tyniec =

Historic village in Poland

Coordinates: 50°00′39″N 19°49′13″E

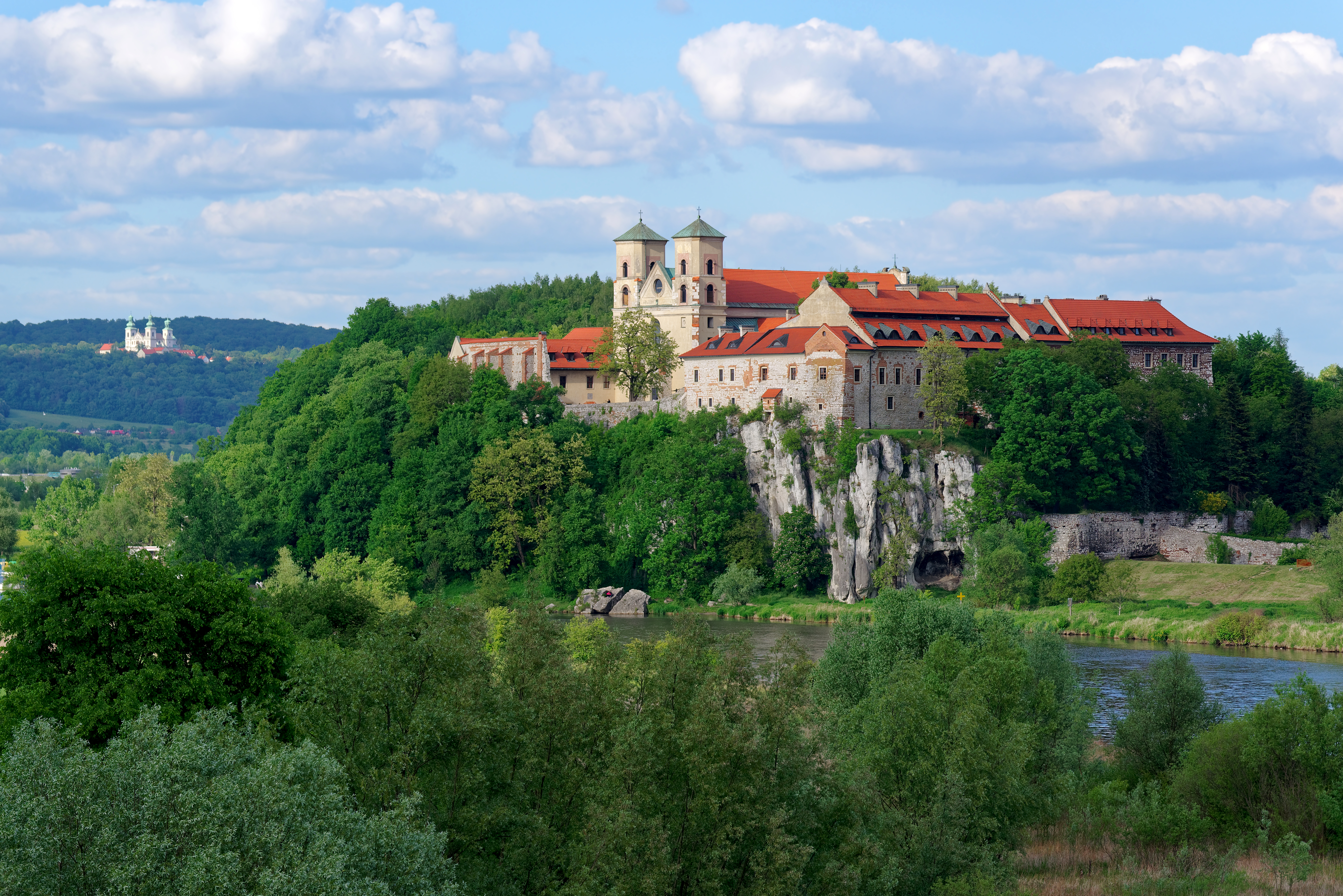
Benedictine abbey

Tyniec is a historic village in Poland on the Vistula river, since 1973 a part of the city of Kraków (currently in the district of Dębniki). Tyniec is notable for its Benedictine abbey founded by King Casimir the Restorer in 1044.

== Etymology ==
The name of the village comes from a Celtic language word "tyn", which means wall or fence, and which means that the history of Tyniec as a fortified settlement (see gord) dates back to pre-Slavic times.

== Geography ==
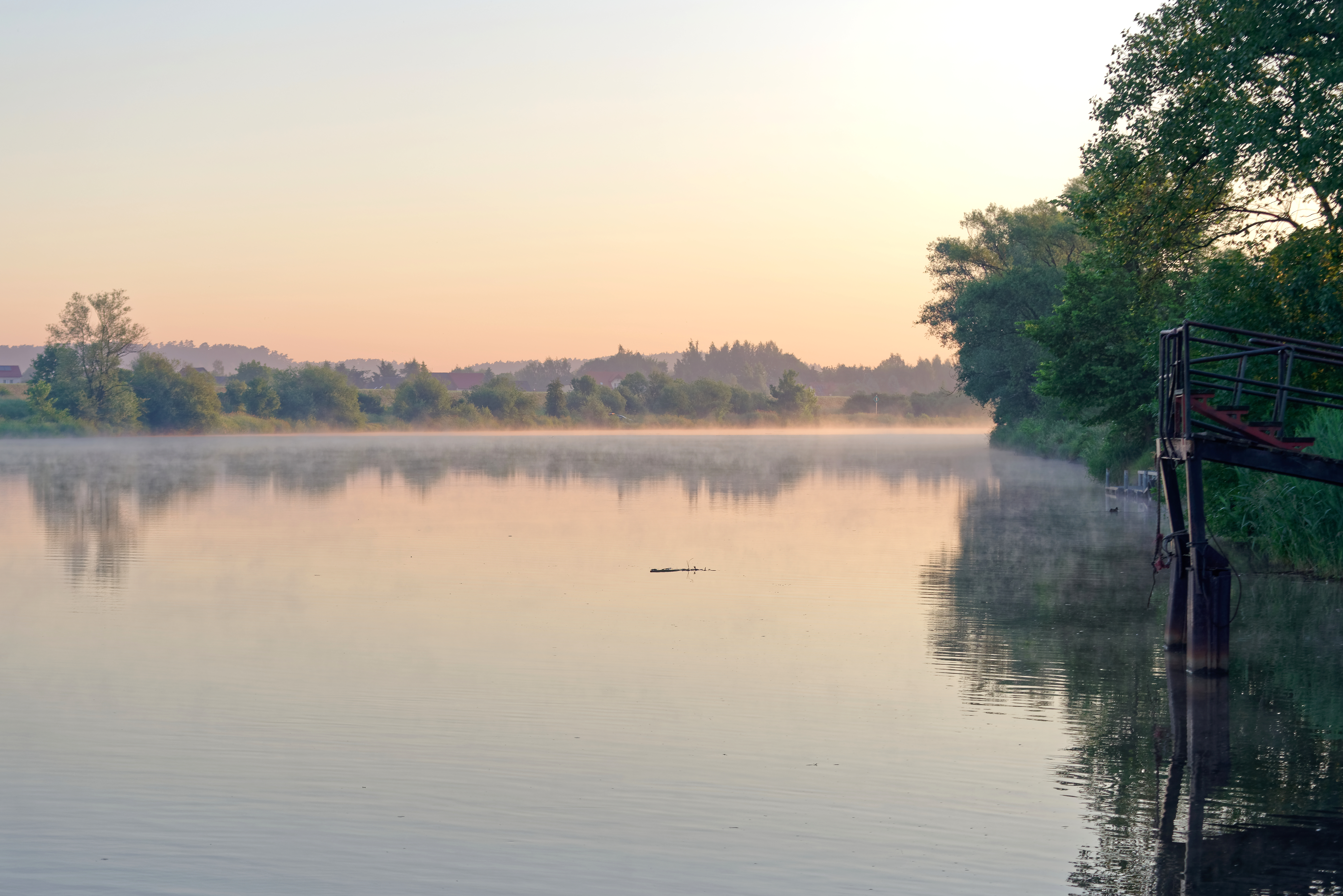
Wisła river seen from Tyniec in the early morning

Tyniec lies 12 km (7 mi) southwest of the centre of Kraków, on the right bank of the Vistula, among limestone Jurassic hills, called the Tyniec Hills, with the highest one being Wielogora (also called Guminek), 293 metres (961 feet) above sea level. Furthermore, Tyniec has a Vistula canyon (called Tyniec Gate), a Skolczanka Nature Reserve (est. 1957), and a locally renowned water source, Zrodlo Swietojanskie, the only source of this kind in the city of Kraków. In ancient times the village was located along a merchant trade route from Kraków, via Oświęcim, to Moravia and Bohemia.

== History ==
The history of human settlement in the area of the village dates back to the Paleolithic period. On top of the Gora Klasztorna hill traces of a Neolithic settlement were found. It had a ceramics work, there also was a mint, which manufactured silver Celtic coins.

Probably in the early 10th century, Tyniec was settled by the Vistulans, which some time ca. 1000 became part of the early Kingdom of Poland. The village was a royal property, and the decision of King Casimir the Restorer to locate a Benedictine abbey here (ca. 1040) is regarded as one of the most important events in the history of Tyniec. In 1259 the village was destroyed during the Mongol invasion of Poland, by Tatar hordes heading from Kraków towards Silesia. Complete destruction was brought again in the Swedish invasion of Poland. In 1771–1772, during the Bar Confederation, the village was defended by the Polish rebels, fighting the Russians: for example, in the action of 20 May 1771. After the Partitions of Poland, Tyniec, together with the abbey, was annexed by the Habsburg Empire, and remained in the province of Galicia from 1772 until late 1918. In 1816, Austrian authorities closed down the abbey, and the complex gradually began to turn into a ruin.

In the 19th century, Tyniec was a large, yet poor village. Its houses were concentrated in two areas – around the monastery, and along the ancient Kraków – Oświęcim road. Its residents supported themselves by transporting people and goods through the Vistula in their boats and small ferries. In 1973 Tyniec was annexed by the city of Kraków.

== Cyrillo-Methodian monastery ==
Historically, and prior to the arrival of the Roman Catholics, the monks at Tyniec were part of the Cyrillo-Methodian Christian tradition. The Cyrillo-Methodian monks were succeeded by the Benedictines. The Cyrillo-Methodian tradition had begun in Moravia in the year 862. Brothers, Cyril and Methodius, were missionaries who established Christianity in the vernacular for Moravian Slavs. This practice quickly spread throughout the region and into the areas which are now in Poland. Tyniec monks performed the liturgy and read the psalms and Gospels in the Proto-Slavic tongue derived from this period. In 1096, the Monks of Tyniec were expelled and the Roman Catholic approved Slavonic Rite Mass suppressed. These expulsions coincided with the rule of Polish Duke Władysław I Herman, who attributed the birth of his first boy to the help of the Benedictines of Saint Gilles in southern France to whom he had earlier sent great riches asking for intercession for the birth of a healthy child. The expulsions paralleled events in almost the same year throughout the region, most notably at the Sazava Monastery where the Slavonic Rite Mass was also still in use as in Tyniec. There, the Cyrillo-Methodian Sazawa monks were also expelled and replaced with monks of the Latin rite. These expulsions at Sazawa coincided with the rule of the Duke of Bohemia, Bretislaus II.

== See also ==
- The Lesser Polish Way
- Vistula
