= Battle of Orzechowo =

War of the Bar Confederation battle

- Part of the war of the Bar Confederation
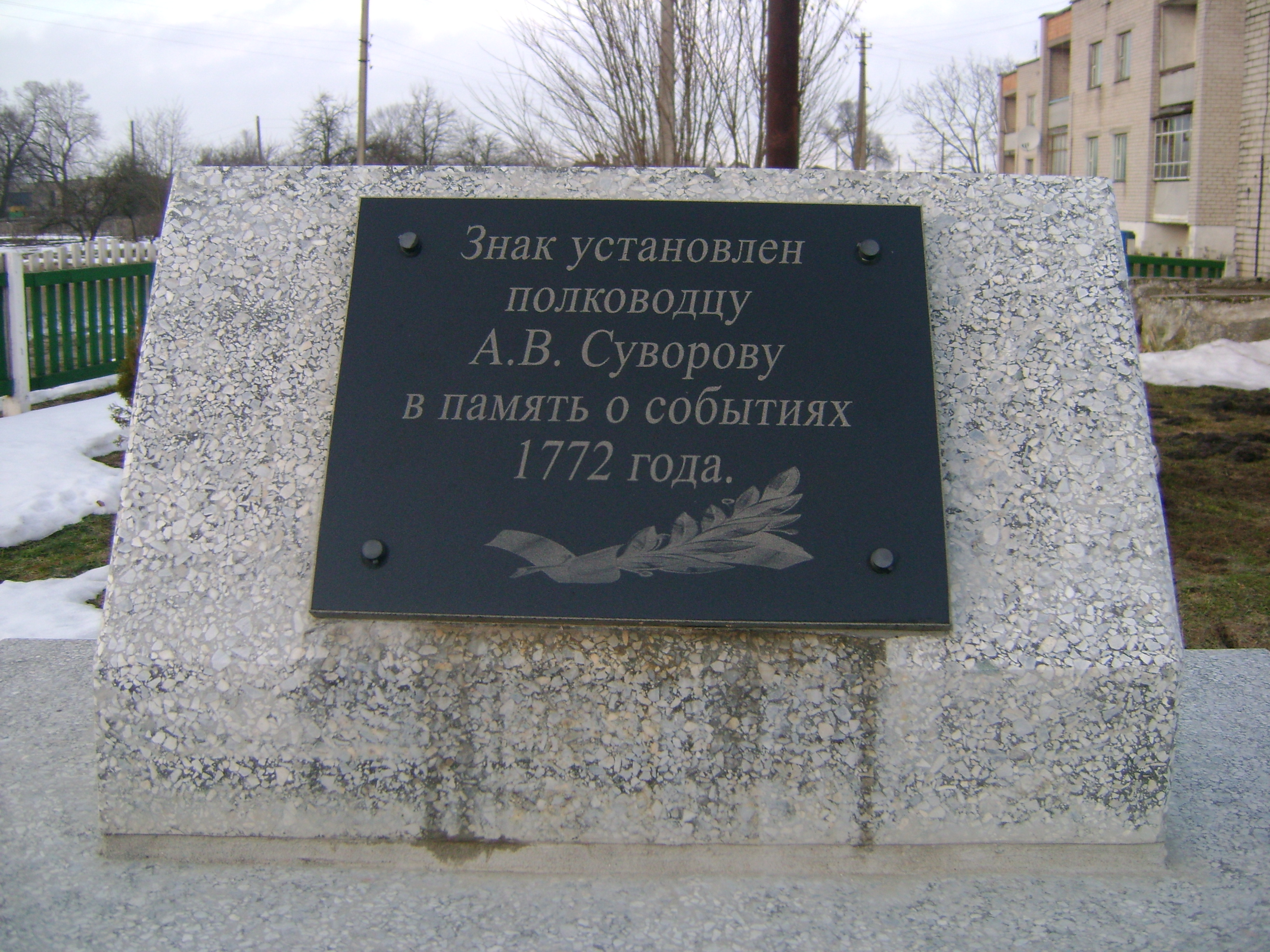
- The sign was erected to commemorate the events of 1772 in honour of commander A.V. Suvorov. (Arekhava/Orekhovo, Belarus)
| Date | 13 September (Note: Julian calendar: 2 Sep.) 1769 |
| Location | Orzechowo, Brest Litovsk Voivodeship, Polish–Lithuanian Commonwealth (now Arekhava, Belarus) |
| Result | Russian victory |

Belligerents
| Russian Empire | Bar Confederation |

Commanders and leaders
| Alexander Suvorov; Mikhail Sakharov; Karl Rönne; Capt. Castelli | Casimir Pulaski |

Strength
| 320–450 men (Note: 320 plus those not in the line of duty; less than 400 before getting Rönne's 50 reinforcements; 400; 450); 2 guns | 2,000 (only cavalrymen); 2 guns |

Casualties and losses
| Small (Note: "5 men and 9 horses killed, 11 men wounded") | Up to 200 or in the 200–300 range or "several hundred" dead and 43 captured |

The battle of Orzechowo (Orekhovo) (Note: Russian: Сражение под Ореховом, Polish: Bitwa pod Orzechowem) took place on 13 September 1769, between the armed forces of the Bar Confederation and the Russian Empire. The Russian troops were led by Brigadier Suvorov and the Polish troops were led by Casimir Pulaski. The battle was decided by an attack by Sakharov's grenadier company and Rönne's 50 carabiniers (the latter were under the command of Captain Count Castelli). The Confederates lost up to 200 men in the battle, including 40 captured, while Russian losses were "very small" despite a significant numerical gap. The affair at Orzechowo put Suvorov in the first row of Russian commanders in Poland and brought him the rank of major general.

== Sources ==
- Osipov, K. (1939). Alexander Suvorov. Translated by Bone, Edith. London, New York, and Melbourne: Hutchinson & Co. (Publishers) Ltd. p. 37.
- Petrushevsky, Alexander (1884). Генералиссимус князь Суворов [Generalissimo Prince Suvorov] (in Russian). Vol. 1 (1st ed.). Saint Petersburg: Типография М. М. Стасюлевича. pp. 81–83.
- Longworth, Philip (1966). The Art of Victory: The Life and Achievements of Field-Marshal Suvorov, 1729–1800. New York: Holt, Rinehart and Winston. pp. 48–49.
