= Glossary of American politics =

List of political jargon and technical terms used in the United States

This glossary of American politics defines terms and phrases used in politics in the United States. The list includes terms specific to U.S. political systems (at both national and sub-national levels), as well as concepts and ideologies that occur in other political systems but which nonetheless are frequently encountered in American politics.

A flow chart showing the hierarchies and checks and balances within the political system of the United States.

== A ==
Act of Congress
A statute enacted by the processes and procedures of the United States Congress.
actual malice
To successfully sue for libel in the United States, a public official must demonstrate actual malice – that the libelous statement was known to be false.
administration
The executive branch under a specific President (or governor, mayor, or other local executive).
advice and consent
appellant
A party who appeals a decision of a lower court of law to a higher authority.
appellate court
A court of law that has the power to review and overturn the decision of a lower court. The Supreme Court is the highest appellate authority in the United States.

== B ==
battleground state
See swing state.
bellwether state
An individual U.S. state that is perceived as an indicator of trends or patterns in political tendencies, reflecting or predicting the political outlook of the nation as a whole. The term is often used in the context of U.S. presidential elections when the nationwide vote closely matches the ballots cast by voters in a particular state.
Bill of Rights
The first ten amendments to the United States Constitution.
blanket primary
A type of primary election in which candidates from all parties appear on the same ballot paper, as opposed to a closed primary, in which voters are asked to choose from a ballot listing candidates from only a single party.
Blue Dog Coalition

A caucus in the United States House of Representatives comprising members of the Democratic Party who identify as centrists or conservatives and profess an independence from the leadership of both major parties. The caucus is the modern development of a more informal grouping of relatively conservative Democrats in U.S. Congress during the 1980s, generally from the Southern United States, who tended to support, across party lines, the economic policies of President Ronald Reagan (a Republican). The "Blue Dog" moniker is derived from the earlier Yellow Dog Democrat and also refers to the work of American artist George Rodrigue, known for paintings featuring a blue dog. Blue Dogs are sometimes seen as descendants of the boll weevils, a similar group of conservative, traditional Democrats.
blue slip
blue state
A U.S. state where the majority of the electorate has supported or tends to support candidates, members, or policies of the Democratic Party. In the two-party system of the United States, the results of national elections are commonly portrayed on a national map in which each of the fifty states is colored either blue (Democratic) or red (Republican) according to the party affiliation of the winning candidate in that state.

== C ==
Camp David
The official country retreat of the President of the United States, located in the Catoctin Mountains of Maryland, approximately 70 miles from the White House. The residence was intended as a place for the president to work more informally, entertain guests, or simply relax.
caucus
A meeting of the members or officials of a political party in order to agree on a policy or elect a candidate to office.
Chief Justice of the United States
closed session
cloture

A motion aimed at bringing a drawn-out debate to a quick end, typically used to end a filibuster in the Senate; in most cases, the requisite majority for invoking cloture is three-fifths of the non-vacant Senate seats. A motion for cloture can be overriden by the nuclear option.
compound republic
A phrase used by U.S. President James Madison to describe the representative, federal, political system of government constructed by the U.S. Constitution, in particular the partnership between the individual states and the central government, each of which is imbued with certain separate sovereign powers but also acts as a check and balance upon the other.
concurrent powers
Powers and responsibilities shared between two or more governments, in particular those shared between the federal and state governments as laid out by the U.S. Constitution. Although both levels of government maintain sovereign jurisdictions where they govern separately, other tasks are shared, such as raising taxes, establishing law courts, and providing for an integrated national system of road transportation.
conferee
A member of the Senate or the House of Representatives who is assigned by their respective body to a conference committee.
Congress
The bicameral legislative branch of the federal government of the United States, consisting of the House of Representatives and the Senate. Both houses combine for a total of 535 voting members of Congress, who are chosen through direct election. Congress sits for two-year terms in the United States Capitol in Washington, D.C.
Congressional caucus
A group of Congress members that meet to pursue common legislative objectives.
Congressional cloakrooms
A set of rooms in the U.S. Capitol Building adjacent to the legislative chambers of the Senate and the House of Representatives which were originally used by members of Congress to hang their hats and overcoats, and which now provide informal meeting spaces where Senators and Representatives can discuss legislative deals and strategy.
Congressional Record
The official public record of the proceedings and debates of the United States Congress, issued approximately every two weeks while Congress is in session. It is published by the United States Government Publishing Office.
Constitution of the United States
continuing resolution (CR)

== D ==
Declaration of Independence
A document written chiefly by Thomas Jefferson and adopted by the Continental Congress in 1776 which formally declared the intent of the original American colonies to govern themselves independently of British rule and listed the various reasons why the American colonists no longer accepted British sovereignty. The adoption of the Declaration is remembered as one of the most significant moments of the American Revolution, as it officially brought to an end any effort to address the colonists' grievances within the strictures of the colonial system and publicly announced their demand for independence and their intention to fight for it if necessary. The text of the Declaration outlines the moral obligations of governments with respect to their subjects and then addresses specific cases in which the colonial governments under King George III had failed to meet these obligations. It is still frequently mentioned and cited in modern U.S. politics.
delegated powers

Those powers granted by the states to the national legislature by Article One, Section Eight of the United States Constitution: namely, to manage the national debt; to regulate commerce between the states, with foreign powers, and with Native American nations; to mint a national currency and standardize weights and measures; to establish a mail service and construct roads; to enforce patents and copyright; to constitute federal courts under the Supreme Court; to manage the nation's military capability and defend its interests in foreign affairs; to guarantee the internal security of the nation; and "to make laws which shall be necessary and proper for carrying into execution the foregoing powers". Every act of Congress must, in some way, be constitutionally justified by referring back to one of these delegated powers; this has often been aided by a broad interpretation of the Commerce Clause and the Necessary and Proper Clause.
democracy

The donkey is the unofficial election symbol of the Democratic Party.

Democratic Party
One of the two major contemporary political parties in the two-party system of the United States, along with its main rival, the Republican Party. Though the modern version of the party is a big-tent coalition comprising multiple distinct ideologies, Democrats generally espouse a philosophy that is socially and economically liberal. Since 2000, the color blue has been widely used to represent the Democratic Party in diagrams indicating partisanship, such as election maps.
denied powers
Those powers that, as outlined by the United States Constitution, remain in possession of United States citizens and cannot be legislated away by the federal or state governments. Denied powers include, for example, the provisions contained within the Bill of Rights, such as freedom of speech.
direct primary
A type of primary election in which, at the national party convention, victorious delegates are bound to vote for the candidate they officially pledged to support during primary. This is in contrast to an indirect primary, in which the delegate is under no such obligation and may use their discretion in choosing who to vote for as the party's candidate.
District of Columbia
divided government
dual federalism
The division of powers between the federal and state governments in the 19th century.

== E ==
Elastic Clause
See Necessary and Proper Clause.
Electoral College
The 538 electors nominated by the states to elect the President.
enrolled bill
enumerated powers
See delegated powers.
executive privilege
The right of the President of the United States to withhold information from Congress, federal courts, the states, or the general public. Although this right is not explicitly addressed in the Constitution, executive privilege is generally assumed on the grounds that if there were no secrecy about the deliberations of the executive branch, there might be little incentive for advice given to the president to be candid or truthful. Presidents have often refused to supply information by arguing that doing so would be incompatible with the national interest; in 1974, during the Watergate scandal, the Supreme Court ruled that executive privilege did not extend to criminal investigations.
executive session

== F ==
federalism
filibuster
Talking until the time available expires, a tactic used especially during debates in the United States Senate.
first-past-the-post

== G ==
gerrymandering
Deliberately arranging the boundaries of electoral districts so as to bias the results of elections held in those districts and thereby favor a particular political party or demographic.
Grand Old Party (GOP)
See Republican Party.
guillotine
See cloture.

== H ==
Hatch Act

A federal law which prohibits civil service employees in the executive branch of the federal government, except the President and the Vice President, from engaging in certain forms of political activity.
hold
hopper
The wooden box located on the desk of the Clerk of the United States House of Representatives in which members deposit draft bills or resolutions that they wish to introduce to the chamber for deliberation. The Senate has no equivalent receptacle; draft legislation is instead simply handed to a clerk.
House of Representatives

== I ==
impeachment
The process of officially charging an elected official, such as the President, with a crime and trying them.
implied powers
Those powers that, although not explicitly addressed in the Constitution, are deemed to be logical extensions or implications of it. For example, because the Constitution charges Congress with regulating the borrowing of money and the minting of currency on behalf of the United States, the formation of a national bank has been accepted as an implied power that serves as a logical extension of these responsibilities, and legislation establishing one was passed in 1791. Many of the implied powers are constitutionally justified by the Necessary and Proper Clause or the Commerce Clause.
indirect primary
A type of primary election in which the victorious delegate is under no obligation to vote for a particular candidate at the national party convention. By contrast, a direct primary requires winners to vote for the candidate they pledged to support while campaigning to be a delegate.
initiative election
A referendum on a specific issue that is initiated once a designated number of citizens registers their support for the referendum, upon which a decision on the issue is put before the electorate as a whole.
iron triangle
A colloquial term for the mutually supportive three-sided relationship that can develop between legislators, bureaucrats, and interest groups who prioritize securing each other's interests rather than serving the public good.

== J ==
joint resolution
joint session
judicial activism
Judicial rulings which go beyond a narrow reading of the law to implement a broader morality or policy.

== K ==
Kitchen Cabinet
(slang) The closest personal advisors of the President's cabinet or administration.

== L ==
lame duck
line-item veto
A power of the executive to strike or veto individual provisions or "line items" of a bill, such as spending on a particular item.
lunatic fringe
A fringe group consisting of extremists with eccentric or fanatical views. The term was popularized by Theodore Roosevelt, who wrote in 1913 that "Every reform movement has a lunatic fringe."

== M ==
military–industrial complex
The vested interest of the military and its suppliers and supporters.

== N ==
Necessary and Proper Clause
The elastic clause which gives Congress the power to do whatever is deemed "necessary and proper" in order to do its duty.
nuclear option

== O ==
open primary
A primary election which is open to all electors, not just members of a particular party.

== P ==
pardon
A power of the President to lessen or set aside a punishment.
plenum

A meeting of a deliberative assembly in which all members of all parties are in attendance. Contrast quorum.
plurality
point of order
political party
President of the United States (POTUS)

== Q ==
qualified majority
See supermajority.
quid pro quo
A Latin phrase meaning "something for something".
quorum
The minimum number of members of a deliberative assembly that is necessary to conduct the business of that assembly. The requirement is intended to protect against unrepresentative action in the name of the assembly by an unduly small number of members. In both the U.S. House of Representatives and the Senate, the designated quorum is usually a simple majority of their respective members (218 and 51, respectively). Contrast plenum.

== R ==
The elephant is the unofficial election symbol of the Republican Party.

Republican Party

One of the two major contemporary political parties in the two-party system of the United States, along with its main rival, the Democratic Party. In modern times, Republicans generally espouse a philosophy that is socially and economically conservative. Since 2000, the color red has been widely used to represent the Republican Party in diagrams indicating partisanship, such as election maps.
republicanism
rider
Rule of Four
An informal quorum of the United States Supreme Court when deciding to take cases.

== S ==
Saxbe fix
select committee
Senate
Senatorial courtesy
separation of powers
The division of power between branches of government such as the executive, judiciary and legislature.
simple majority
Speaker of the House
special committee
See select committee.
sponsor

The Congressperson who presents or introduces a bill or resolution to Congress for consideration, or, in cases where a bill is introduced jointly by multiple members of Congress, the first member to be listed.
standing committee
Standing Rules of the Senate
supermajority

Supreme Court of the United States (SCOTUS)

== T ==
third party
Any political party other than the two traditional leading political parties of the United States, the Democratic Party and Republican Party.
two-thirds majority

== U ==
unanimous consent
unfunded mandate
A duty or requirement for which no money is provided.

== V ==
veto
A power of the President to refuse to approve an act of Congress.
Vice President of the United States

== W ==
whip
whistleblower
A person who reports an illegal or unethical action.
whistle stop
A quick stop at a minor place during a campaign for an elected office.

== Y ==
yellow journalism
Exaggerated or sensational press reporting.

== See also ==
- Glossary of policy debate terms
