= John Skey Eustace =

American lawyer and officer (1760–1805)

Coat of arms of John Skey Eustace

John Skey Eustace (10 August 1760 in Flushing, Province of New York, British America – 25 August 1805 in Newburgh, New York) was an officer and a veteran of both the American and French Revolutionary Wars. A mercurial figure, Eustace was a revolutionary soldier, colonel of the Continental Army (1781), and maréchal de camp in the French Revolutionary Army between 1792 and 1793. In 1794 he supported the Batavian revolution and was arrested for a short time. In February 1797 he was expelled from France, suspected of spying for the British. He was arrested in Dover for his advice to the Dutch revolutionaries and subsequently expelled from England, after which he traveled to America and retired in New York. Eustace regularly published his official and private correspondence. Eustace was close to and corresponded with several of the Founding Fathers, however he was also regarded as a political adventurer of doubtful purpose and character.

== Life ==
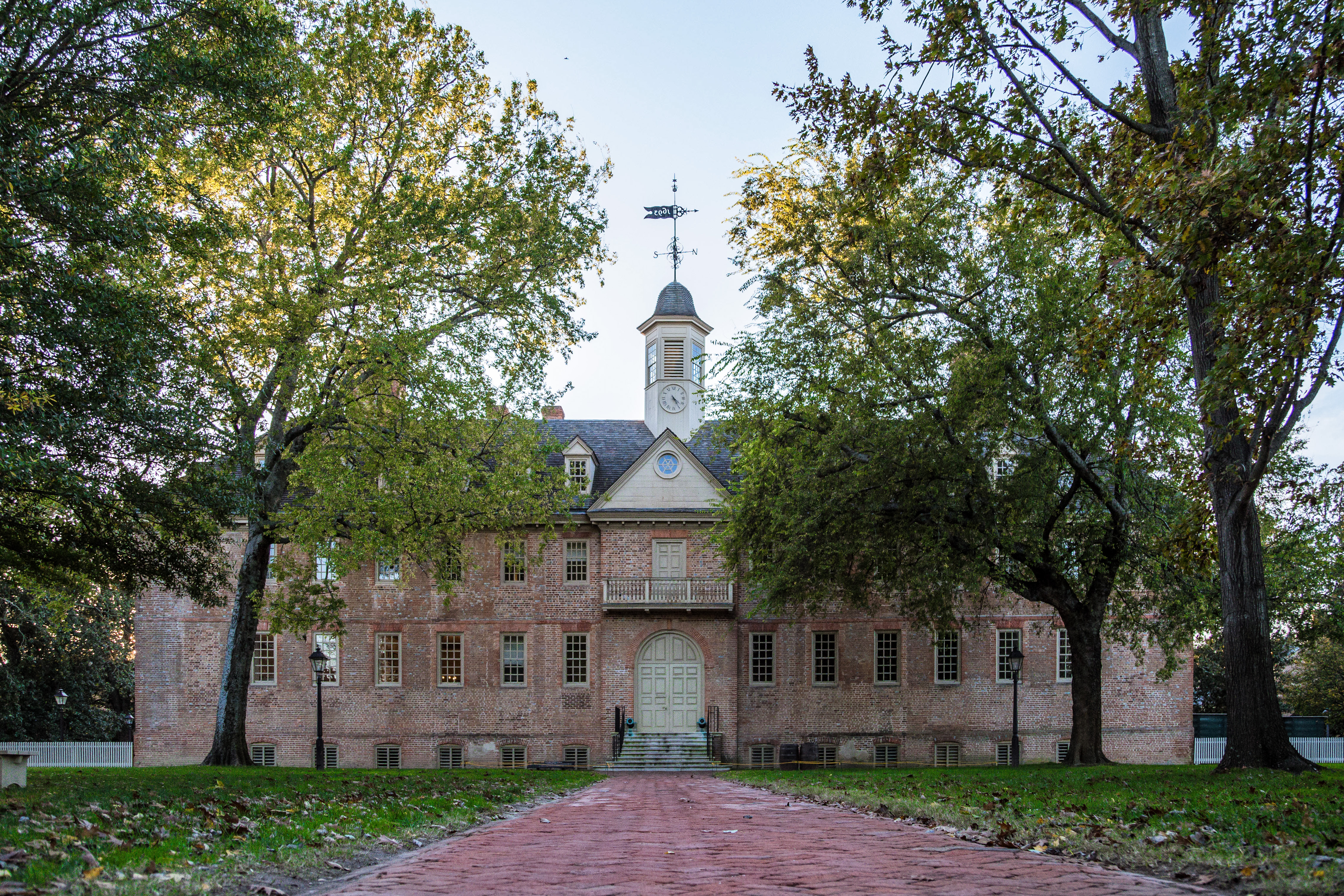
The Wren Building, at the College of William & Mary

John Skey Eustace was the grandson of Colonel Lauchlin Campbell, a Scottish immigrant living at Campbell Hall, Orange County, New York. From 1738 to 1740 Campbell brought 83 families from Scotland to New York at his own expense on the false promise of land grants from the New York colonial governor William Cosby. His daughter Margaret (1733–1809) was born on Islay (Inner Hebrides) and married at a young age to Dr. John Eustace (1720–1769), a colonial physician and justice of the peace who corresponded with Laurence Sterne. Around 1764 his father left his family and moved to Wilmington, North Carolina. John's sister Kitty had become Lord Dunmore's mistress when she was still a teenager and he was governor of New York. On gaining his post in Virginia in 1771, Dunmore arrived with Kitty's mother and little brother in tow. Eustace grew up in Norfolk, Virginia, where his mother ran a boarding house. She was friendly with Thomas Burke. Dunmore arranged for young John's education, first with a tutor and then at the College of William & Mary.

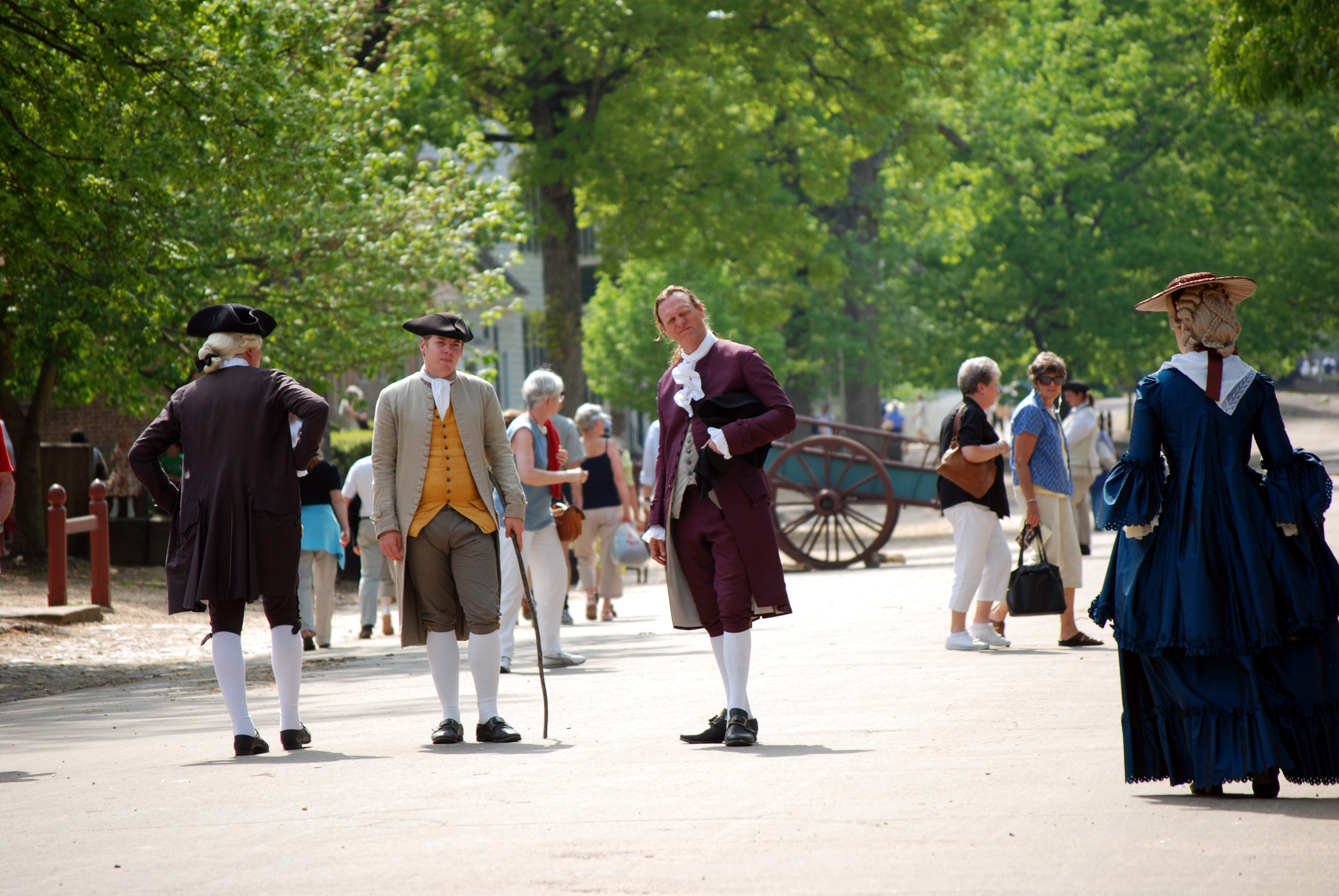
Several interpreters on Duke of Gloucester Street, Colonial Williamsburg

In late 1775, Dunmore sent Eustace to Boston with a letter to Gen. William Howe recommending him for a post in the British army. His travel companion, a British officer, was concealing Lord Dunmore's military plans. Somehow the fifteen-year-old ended up being marched to the headquarters of General George Washington, the opposing commander-in-chief. He joined the Continental Army during the Siege of Boston. After the Continental Army was reorganized Eustace served successively as an aide-de-camp to Charles Lee, Joseph Reed, John Sullivan (1777) and Nathanael Greene (1779).

Eustace participated in the repulse of the first British attack on Charleston, Battles of Trenton, Princeton, and Germantown. In 1778 he was at the siege of Newport, during the military campaign of 1779 against the Iroquois and loyalists on the New York border, known as the "Sullivan Expedition". General Lee regarded him as his adopted son and declared him as his heir, but Eustace decided to desert the unpredictable Lee after Lee's defeat at the Battle of Monmouth. Lee was subsequently court-martialed and his military service was brought to an end. Lee was succeeded by Von Steuben.

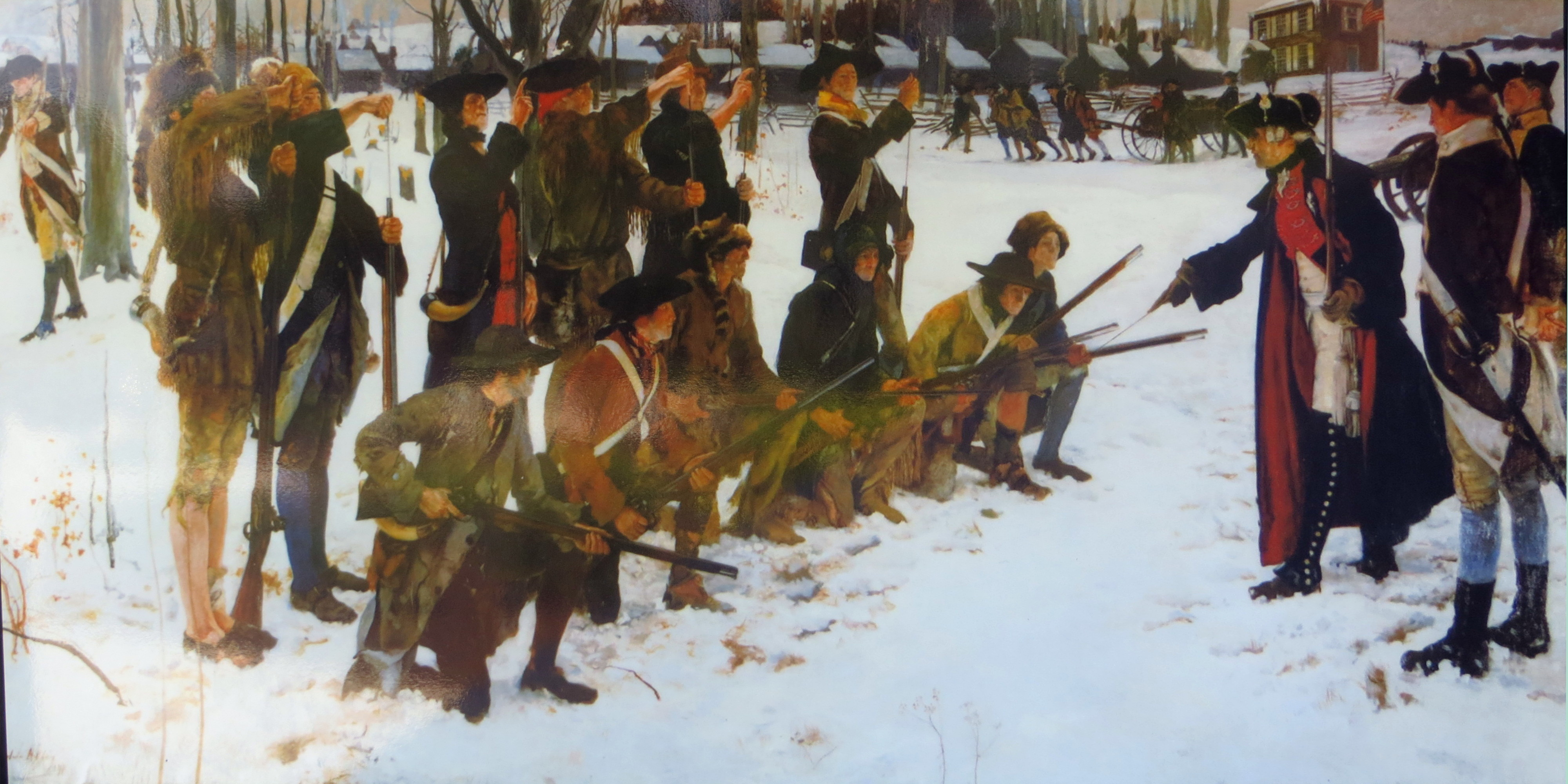
Baron von Steuben drilling troops at Valley Forge, by E.A. Abbey (c. 1904), Pennsylvania State Capitol, Harrisburg

Eustace was taught the essentials of military drills, tactics, and discipline based on Prussian techniques by Von Steuben who protected him. In 1779 Eustace proposed an interview with Colonel Archibald Campbell, a respected and perhaps related governor of Georgia. In January 1780 he resigned from the army but not from war. He was involved in the Battle of the Chesapeake and appointed colonel on 29 August 1781 of the militia in State of Georgia by Nathan Brownson. In the same year he became adjutant general and assisted governor Stephen Heard. Living in Augusta, Georgia he contacted Governor Morris. In 1782 he lived in Ebenezer, Georgia; now a ghost town then the capital.

During the American Revolution, many Georgians and Carolinians moved to Florida along with their slaves. In December he was sent on a mission to Saint-Augustine, East Florida to deal with the council (Gen. Tonyn) on captured slaves. In March he returned to Charlestown. (Note: Alexander Leslie (British Army officer) explicitly authorized the use of British troops to "rescue" slaves as compensation for loyalists. Owners would be compensated for the value of these slaves.)

Having been informed that Sir Guy Carleton has ordered the restoration of such slaves as have left their owners and followed the British armies and fleet, he has appointed Colonel John Skey Eustace and Maj. Peter Deveaux as commissioner to arrange the business with General Leslie; asks for his friendly cooperation with them and promises that they will comply with the rules of the etiquette of flags; expresses his admiration of the humanity shown by Sir Guy Carleton.

On 6 May 1783, Carleton and George Washington met face to face for the first time after years of long-distance communication; Carleton made it clear to Washington that the ex-slaves would not be returned to their former masters.

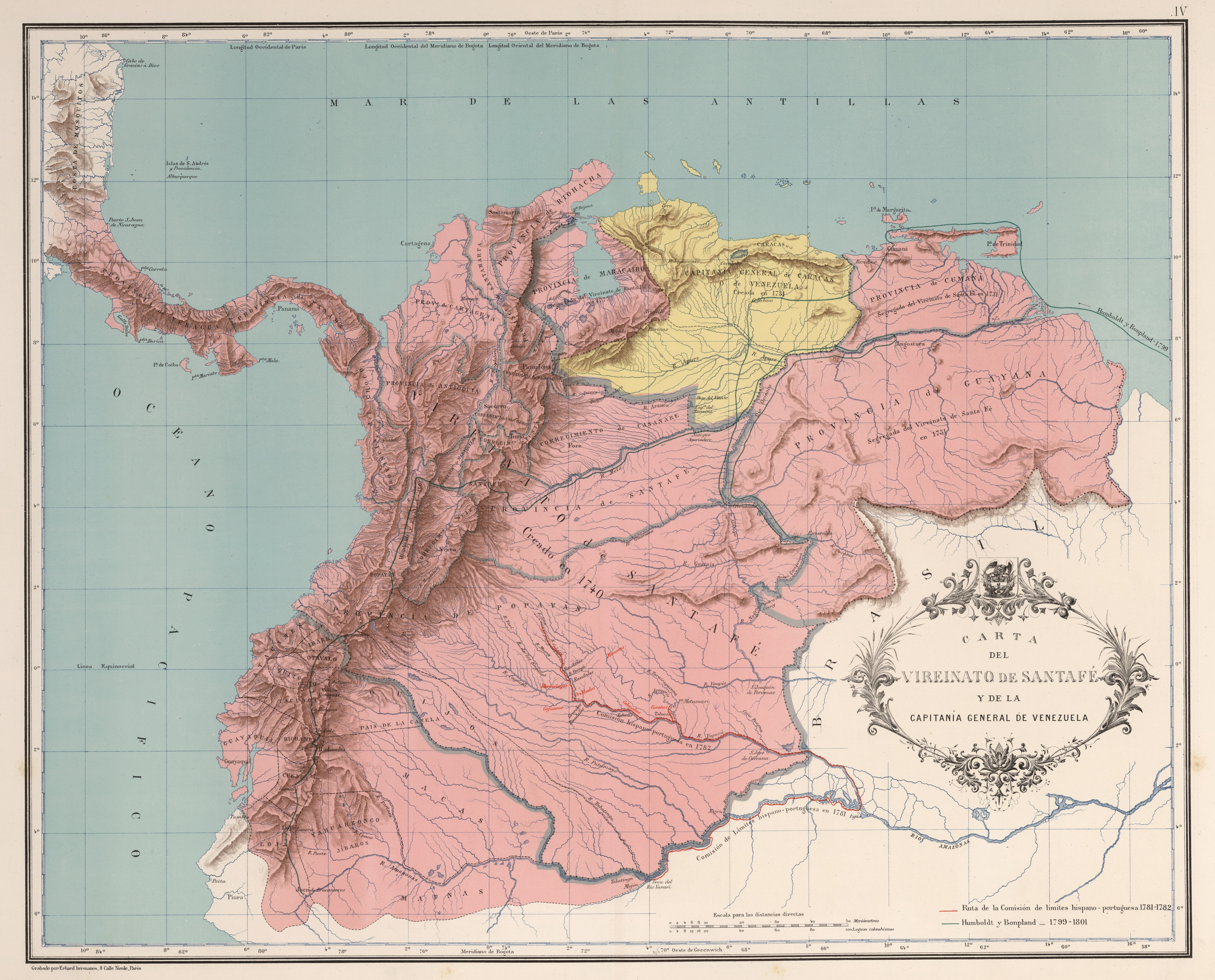
Viceroyalty of New Granada (in pink) and the province of Venezuela (in yellow) in 1742

In September 1783, Britain accepted American independence, and the war officially ended. Eustace became a member of the Society of the Cincinnati and practiced briefly as a lawyer. He was invited to a general meeting of the Society in Philadelphia, in May 1784, but did not attend. Several times he had met with the well-informed lawyer Francisco de Miranda travelling from North-Carolina to Massachusetts. At the end of 1783, Eustace sailed to Cuba, Trinidad and Venezuela to learn Spanish. He may have been influenced by the dynamic Miranda who had a secret project to emancipate the Kingdom of Venezuela from Spanish rule. He then lived in Madrid, where he opened a snuff, cigar and tobacco shop. In 1787, he visited Havanna and London. With the encouragement of Miranda, he complained to the Spanish court about abuses he had suffered at the hands of colonial officials. They unsuccessfully tried to interest a friend of Miranda, Prime Minister William Pitt the Younger, in a project for the liberation of Venezuela.

=== France ===
Between 1789 and 1791, John S. Eustace lived in Bordeaux, and kept George Washington and Thomas Jefferson informed of the events of the French Revolution. With the support of the American consulate, he applied to the Minister of War (Marquis de Grave) with a request for naturalization and admission as a volunteer to the French army. Therefore, he met mayor Pétion de Villeneuve, minister of war Servan, his successor Bouchotte and minister of finance Clavière.

On 20 April 1792, Eustace was accepted into the French service with the rank of colonel and sent to Orchies, Valenciennes and Menen at the border. On 5 June, he was appointed in the staff of the Northern Army (Armée de Belgique) under Nicolas Luckner. He refused to join Marquis de LaFayette, his successor. The goal was to liberate Austrian Netherlands. Eustace was introduced to Louis-Alexandre Berthier. On 9 July he was promoted to field marshal and on 7 September brigadier general under Charles-Francois Dumouriez. He participated in the battles of Valmy and the Jemappes, commanding an infantry brigade. On 20 November Eustace occupied the city of Lier where he planted a Tree of Liberty and ordered local authorities to rename the city square in honor of General Washington. He also issued instructions to rename various boulevards in the town in honor of himself, general Dumouriez and several French deputies.

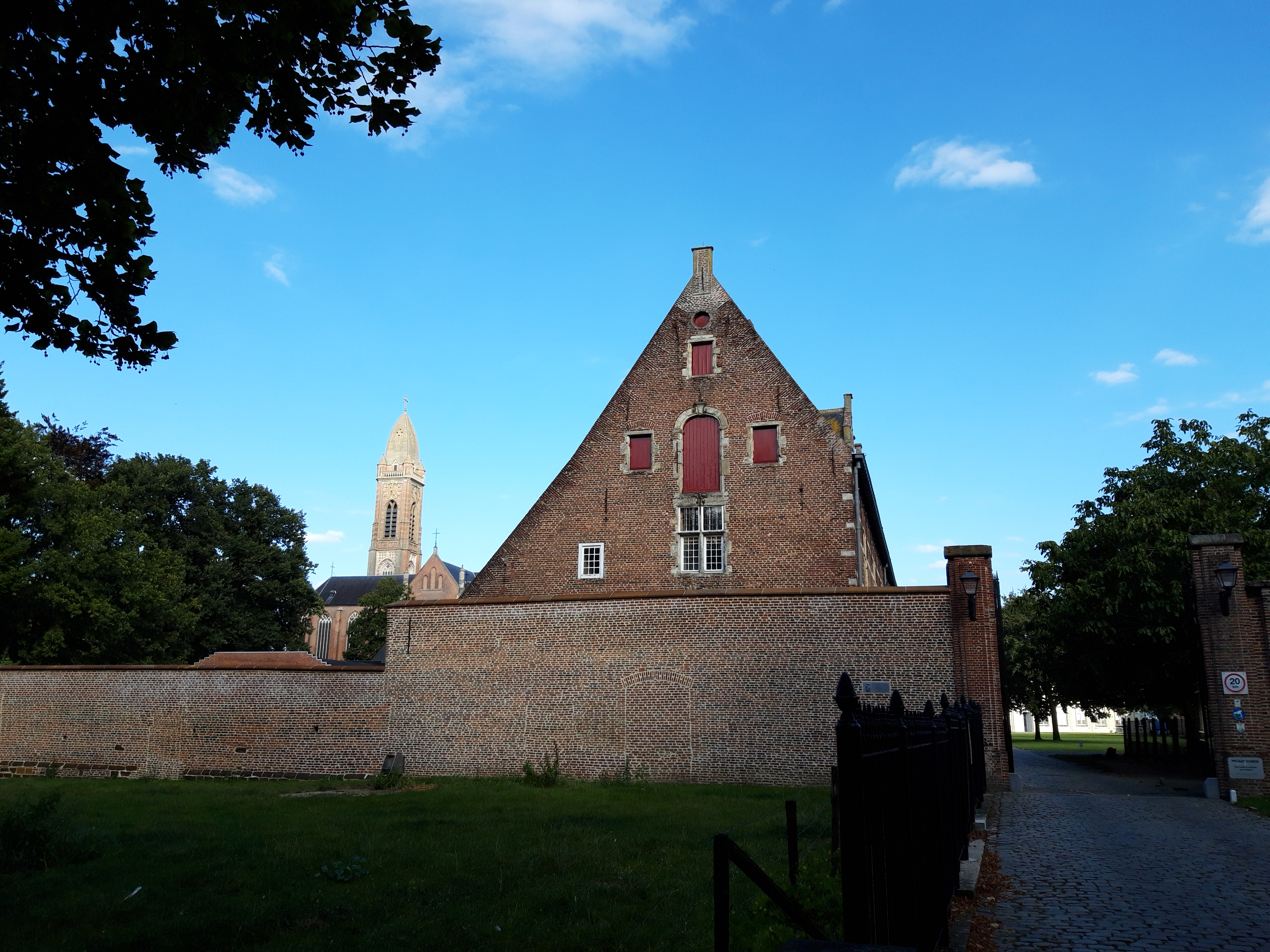
Entrance Tongerlo Abbey

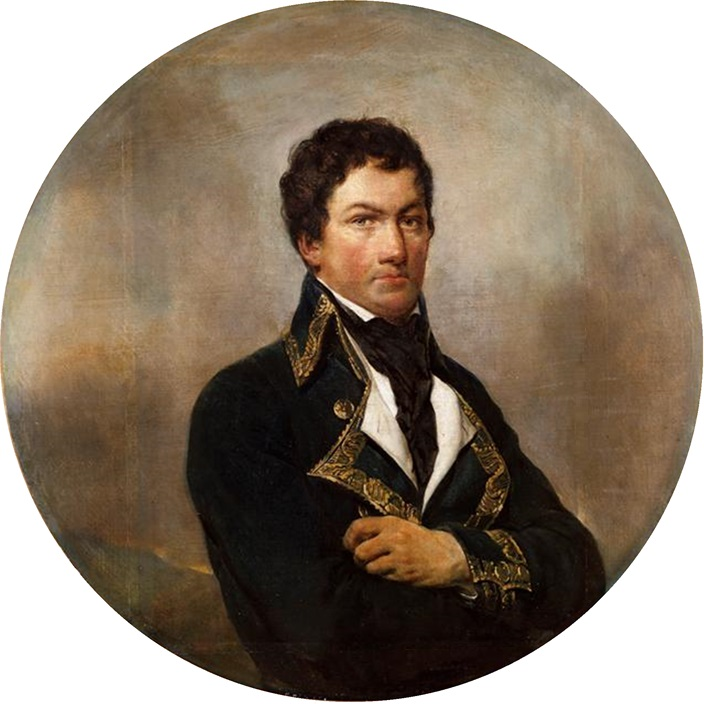
Rouget – François Miranda, général de division à l'armée du Nord en 1792 (1756–1816)

On 29 November, Eustace sent a letter to the commander of Maastricht demanding the surrender of French emigrants who had taken refuge in this Dutch city. He then personally visited Maastricht, where he dined with Major General Prince von Hesse-Darmstadt, the German commander in Austrian service. As a result, he was removed from command, according to himself no longer part of the army. On 13 December, Miranda the only general from Latin America in French service took over. Dumouriez planned to arrest and sent Eustace to Paris to explain his behavior before the Convention Nationale. However, Eustace ignored the order and, claiming to be dangerously ill, retired to the Carmelite nuns at Tongerlo Abbey, where he successfully resisted an attempt to question and arrest him.

On 1 February 1793 the French First Republic declared war on the monarch of Great Britain and William V of Orange, stadtholder of the Dutch Republic. By mid-February Lazare Carnot proposed that annexation be undertaken on behalf of French interests whether or not the people to be annexed so wished. It seems both Eustace and Miranda disagreed; on 14 March Eustace wrote a letter to Dumouriez.

After the disaster at the Battle of Neerwinden (1793) Eustace returned to Antwerp. On 20 March Danton and Delacroix were sent to his headquarters at Saint-Amand-les-Eaux to interrogate Dumouriez and sent Miranda, Valence, Luckner, etc. back to Paris. Aware that if he returned to Paris he would probably be executed, Dumouriez turned to the Austrians. Dumouriez's defection on 5 April changed the course of the events.

On 29 March Eustace was brought to Paris by two gendarmes. Jean-Paul Marat accused Eustace in the convention of the failure of the Siege of Maastricht (1793). On 6 April he appeared at the "Conseil Executive" but on 22 April Eustace plead for freedom with the removal of all charges using General Washington's Proclamation of Neutrality. An investigation followed into the military leadership of Miranda. It seems Eustace disqualified himself from testifying.

... he was asked the routine question, "Do you know the accused?“ He replied, "I have the honor of detesting the accused!“ Miranda wished him to be allowed to testify, anyhow, but this was not permitted.

On 12 May, Eustace, whose professed love for Miranda had turned into bitter hatred, openly avowed that he considered it an honor to detest the accused, whereupon Fouquier-Tinville promptly announced that his testimony could not be accepted. He then briefly worked for the Society of the Friends of Truth, which opposed the elimination of the Girondists. On 8 August he left the French army and asked the Comité de Sureté Générale for a passport to return to America. He published a letter in Le Moniteur, and was compensated by the ministry for the loss of his horse, carriage and deprivation of liberty. For yet unknown reasons he remained in France. It is possible that he joined Santerre in an expedition to the Vendée.

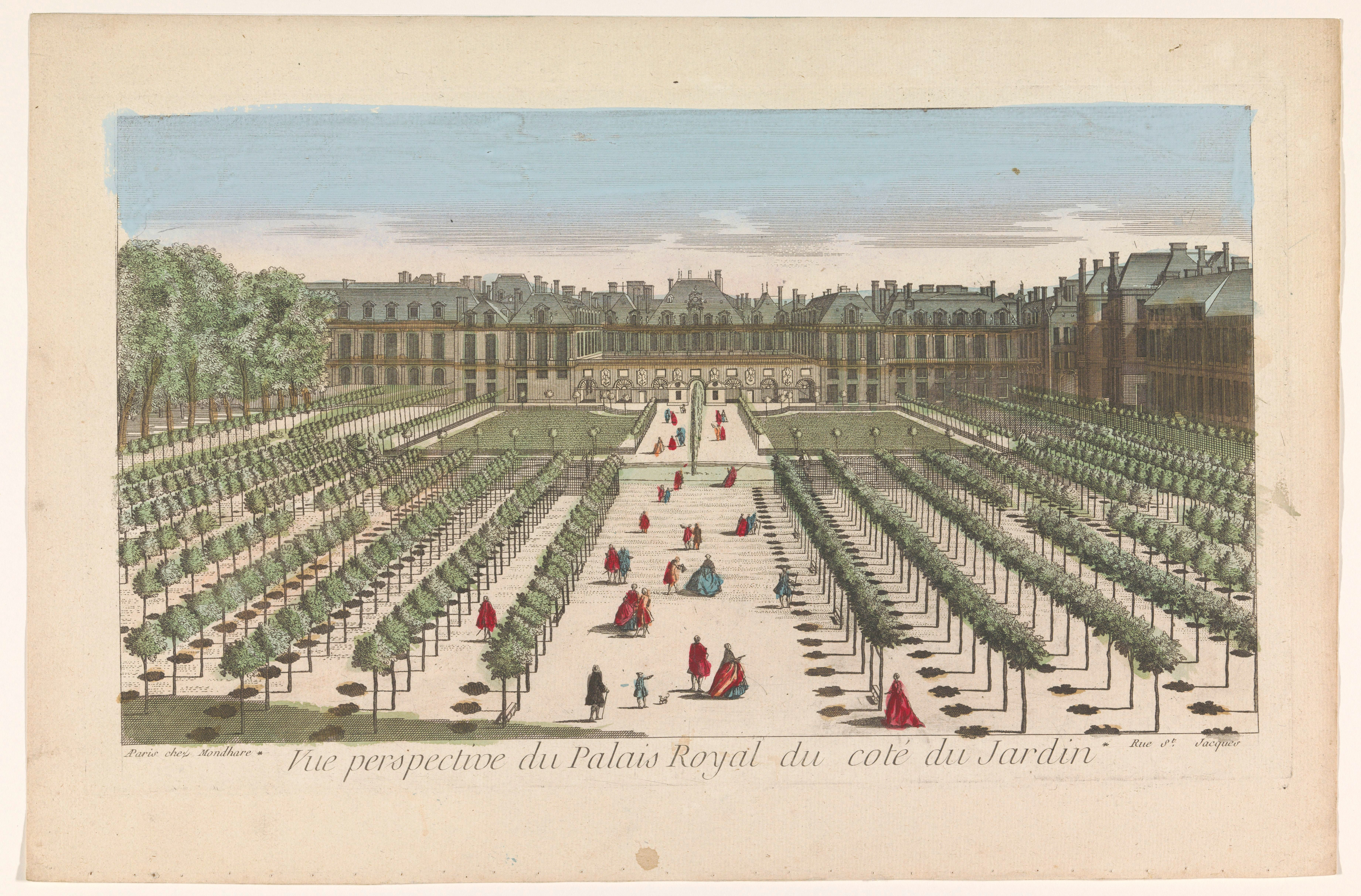
Vue perspective du palais royal du coté du jardin

In June 1794, during the Great Terror, when all foreigners were under attack, the Dutch patriot/emigre/banker Jacob van Staphorst (1747–1812) who lived in an apartment at Palais-Égalité left for Switzerland on an American passport with the help and in the company of Eustace. Together they visited several cities, like Basel, Schaffhausen and Luzern. In October the friends returned to Paris. John Quincy Adams wrote several letters of introduction for Eustace, who wanted to return to the United States via the Netherlands. Eustace send five letters to his friend's brother, Nicolaas van Staphorst, an influential patriot/banker. Mid-October Van Staphorst fled to Kampen, where he found shelter at Jacobus Kantelaar. (Note: Nicolaas van Staphorst was summoned to appear at the court on 28 October 1794, but did not show up. In absence he was sentenced to forced labour and banned from the city.) This was after a request of removal of a British regiment and the discovery of a weapons cache (on Roeterseiland and in his warehouse near Bickerseiland).

=== Netherlands ===
Mid-November Eustace arrived in Amsterdam; a few days later the magistrates arrested and liberated him. Adams believed Eustace returned to the United States in December 1794, but Eustace went to Paris. In Summer 1795 Eustace travelled with his friend William S. Dallam in the Netherlands. He was accused of meddling in political affairs and detained in Scheveningen. He had been in contact with Rutger Jan Schimmelpenninck, Willem Anne Lestevenon, Carel Wouter Visscher and many other leading patriots about the future of the Batavian Republic. Eustace advised organizing the local militia, the distribution of food and suggested the Dutch pay the French army, which happened in the summer of 1795 (see Pieter Stadnitski). After his release, he lived in Rotterdam and published his letters to Van Staphorst.

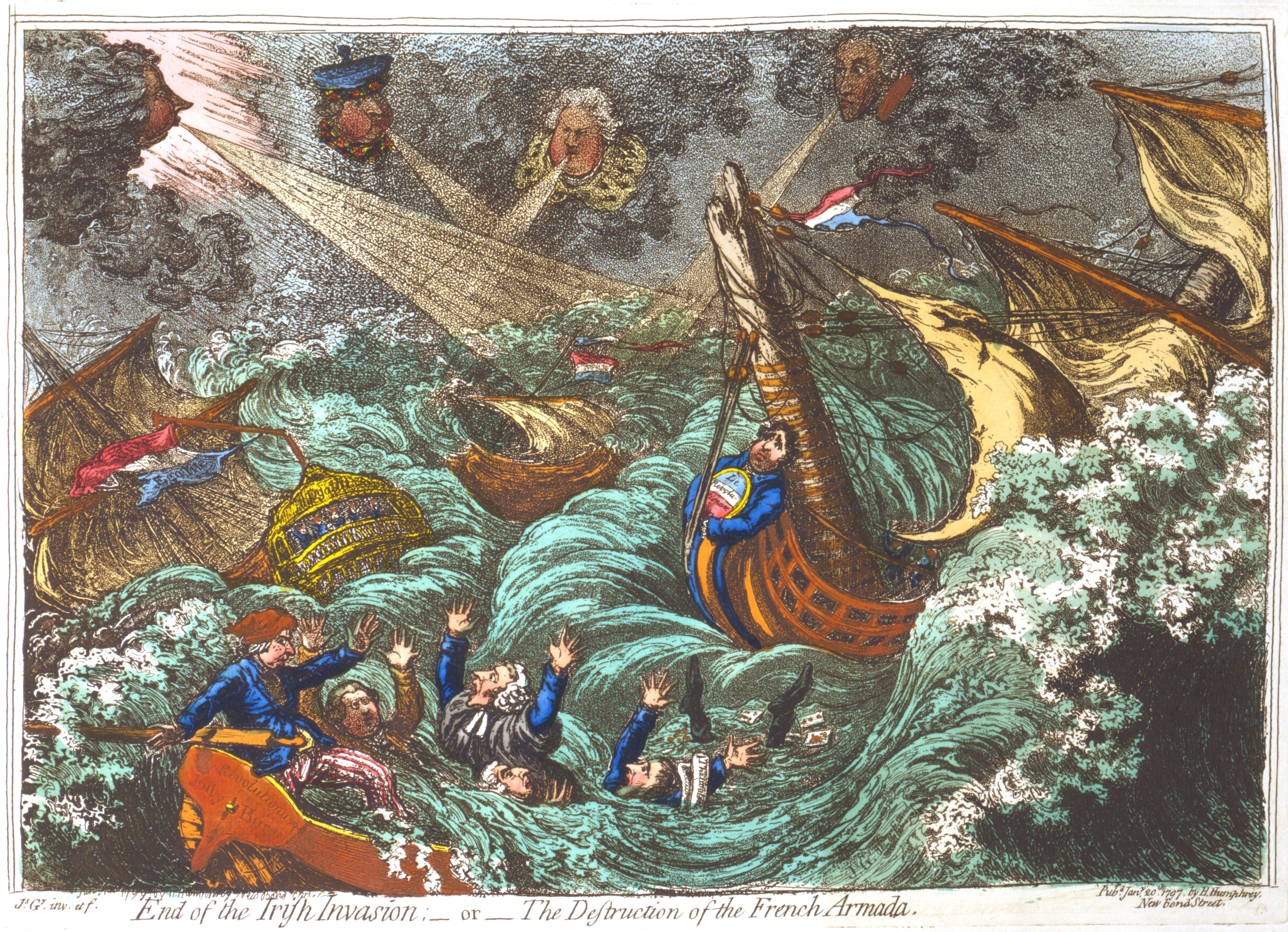
Irish-Invasion by Gillray

In June 1796 Eustace lived in Paris and was engaged in developing a plan for the "fraternal invasion of Ireland", scheduled in December, and the creation of a "French Gibraltar" on the coast of England. He participated in fruitless negotiations with the British envoy, James Harris. Eustace, housed at the Boston hotel, at the fashionable rue Vivienne, (2nd arrondissement of Paris), came under the surveillance of the police. In February 1797 he was expelled from France, as the Directory was suspicious that Eustace was spying for the British. He moved to England (possibly together with Harris) but was arrested at Dover mid-February. He was invited in Burlington House and interrogated on the book bearing his name. He was accused in The Times and several other newspapers of supporting LaFayette, Dumouriez and the Batavian revolution. In early March he was ordered to leave England within 24 hours but was not allowed to leave for France. Eustace travelled to Gravesend, Greenwich and Dartford to "embark for any part of the world he may propose to go". He published an offensive pamphlet, the Exile of Major General Eustace. He was angry at Rufus King, the new ambassador to Great Britain. On 4 February 1798 he was arrested in the Hague, and wrote a letter abjuring his heresies.

In June 1798 he asked the Constitutional Convention to be paid for military services rendered during the American Revolutionary War. In November he travelled to Savannah to settle his mother's business affairs. He offered a trunk containing all his papers, personal and official, to Alexander Hamilton, who regarded him "a very unwelcome correspondent". He retired in Newburgh, New York. In January 1805 he joined the Benevolent Society of Orange County but died in the same year.

== Family ==
In 1772, John's sister Catherine "Kitty" Eustace married James Blair, the son of the Virginia governor John Blair Sr. Kitty was a fine dancer. Their scandalous divorce trial later that year in Williamsburg became a battle over Blair's estate after his death in 1773. Kitty Eustace was represented by John Randolph and Patrick Henry while the estate was represented by Edmund Pendleton and James Mercer with written arguments prepared by Thomas Jefferson. Kitty Eustace then married Seth John Cuthbert in February 1777. Cuthbert became Chairman of the Supreme Executive Council of Georgia in 1779. Her mother's visits to Georgia during the British occupation aroused suspicions of espionage.

John S. Eustace's uncle, Donald Campbell (1722–1784), served as deputy Quartermaster general of New York on the American side during the American Revolution. His mother's other brothers remained loyal and served in the British army. George Campbell (1724–1799) served in Gibraltar, Havana, Martinique, and Quebec during the Seven Years' War. James Campbell (1726- ) served as a lieutenant in the Seven Years' War in the 42nd Regiment at Havana, Louisburg, Martinique, and Quebec.

== Works ==
Eustace was the author of several pamphlets, some designed to embarrass James Monroe:

- Translation of an Obituary in Latin to the memory of Benjamin Franklin (1790)
- Aenspraek ende plegtigheden, welk geschied zyn ter oorzaeke als de fransche troupen de stad Lier hebben in bezit genomen (1792)
- Lettre de M. J.S. Eustace: ci-devant aide-de-camp des majors, généraux Lee & Sullivan, colonel & adjudenant-général de l'état de Géorgie, à Monsieur Joseph Fenwick, consul des États-Unis de l'Amerique, à Bordeaux (1792)
- A Jean Skei Eustace, se disant citoyen des États-Unis d'Amérique, & général de brigade des armées françoises (1793) (Refuting an attack upon Francisco de Miranda made by J.S. Eustace.)
- Le Général Eustace, au Comité de la guerre de la Comité nationale (1793)
- Letters on the crimes of George III., addressed to Citizen Denis; by an American Officer in the service of France. (J.S. Eustace, 1793)
- Le citoyen des États-Unis d'Amérique, Jean-Skey Eustace. A ses frères d’armes, Paris 1793
- Eustace, John Skey, 1760–1805, soldier. Basil [sic], in Switzerland ... Second Year of the French Republic. To [Fulwar Skipwith]. Comments unfavorably about the U.S. Minister in France, Gouverneur Morris, and his supposed indiscretion in public sentiment with regard to the French Directory and the impressments of American seamen. Applauds the appointment of Monroe to replace Morris. Offers lengthy account of his departure from France with only a "common' passport., 1794, September 12
- Traité d’amitié de commerce et de navigation, entre Sa Majesté britannique et les Etats- Unis d’Amérique: Finalement ratifié par la législature américaine, suivi d’un projet fraternel, adressé aux Négocians français, pour effectuer la compensation des pertes occasionnées par les lois américaines, pendant leur commerce dans les Etats-Unis. Paris: Desenne, Year IV (1796/7)
- Correspondence with Thomas Paine (1737–1809) (who criticized George Washington), published under the title of "The Duke of Portland". Paris (1796)
- Official and private correspondence of Major-General J.S. Eustace, citizen of the state of New York. (1796)
- Eustace, John Skey, Letters on the Emancipation and Preservation of the United Provinces, to John de Witt, Esquire, with Lessons of Humanity, Addressed to Nicholas Van Staphorst (Rotterdam 1797).
- Eustace, John Skey. Exile of Major General Eustace : a Citizen of the United States of America, from ... Great-Britain, by Order of His Grace the Duke of Portland, Minister for the Home Department ... London: printed for J. Parsons, and J. Owen, 1797.
- Eustace’s articles, entitled the "Embassy of Mr. Monroe" and signed by "An American Soldier", appeared in the New-York Gazette and General Advertiser on August 22, 23, 24, 25, 27, 31, September 1, 4, 6, 7, 1798
- Letters from Eustace in the National Archives and Records Administration
- Letters from Eustace at the Massachusetts Historical Society
