= Governor of Georgia =

Head of government of the U.S. state of Georgia

- Great Seal of the State of Georgia

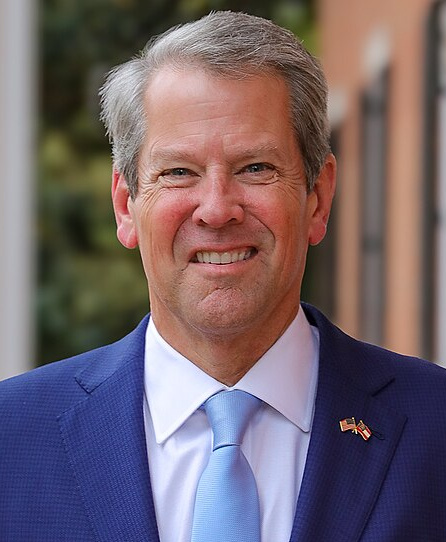
- Incumbent; Brian Kemp since January 14, 2019
- Government of Georgia
- Residence: Georgia Governor's Mansion
- Term length: Four years, renewable once consecutively
- Inaugural holder: Archibald Bulloch
- Formation: July 12, 1775
- Succession: Line of succession
- Deputy: Lieutenant Governor of Georgia
- Salary: $185,000 (2023)
- Website: Official website

The governor of Georgia is the head of government of Georgia and the commander-in-chief of the state's National Guard, when not in federal service, and State Defense Force. The governor also has a duty to enforce state laws, the power to either veto or approve bills passed by the Georgia Legislature, and the power to convene the legislature into special session. The current governor is Republican Brian Kemp, who assumed office on January 14, 2019.

== History of the office ==
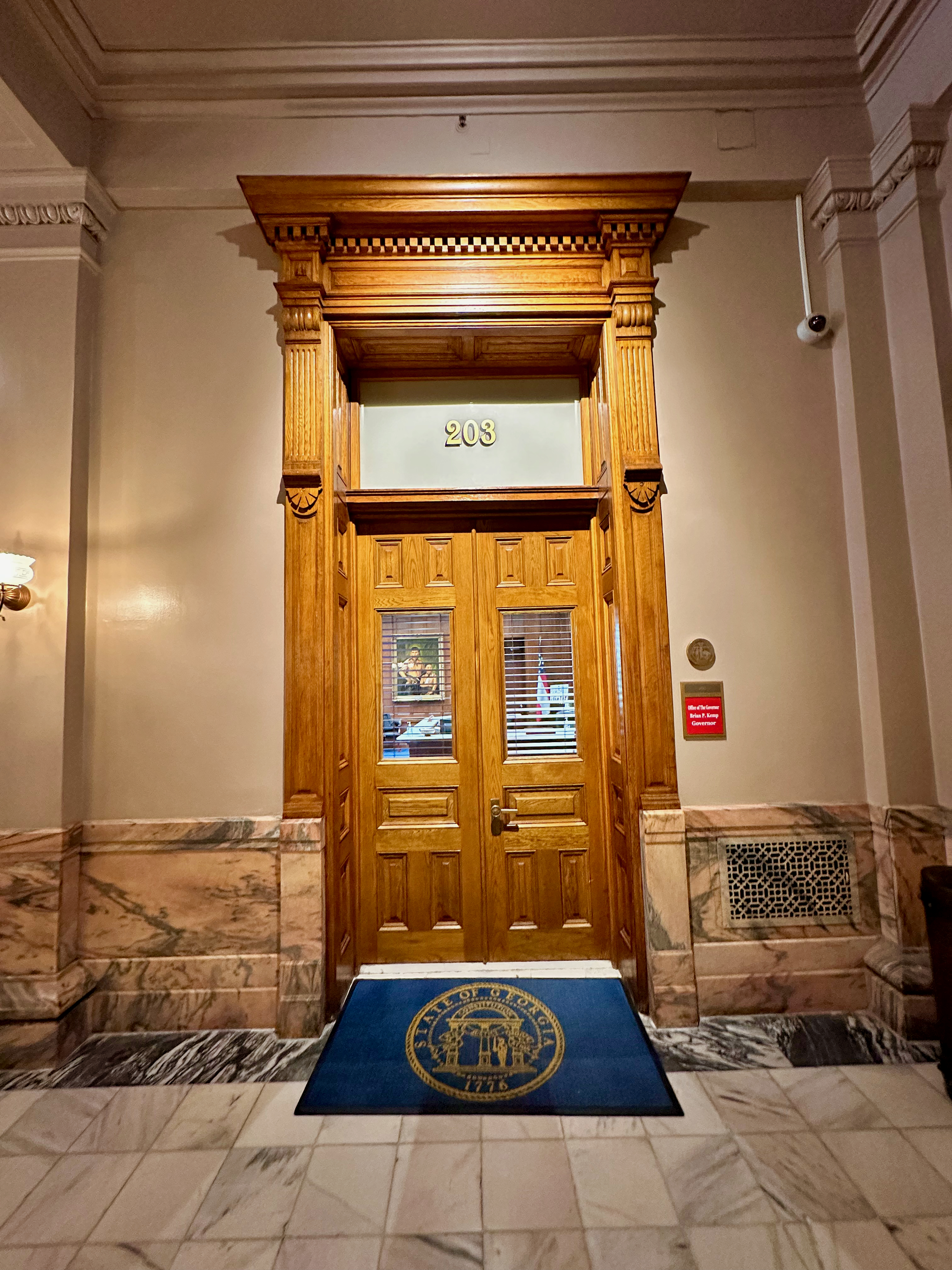
The office of the governor inside the Georgia state capitol building

There have officially been 77 governors of the state of Georgia, including 11 who served more than one distinct term. Georgia was one of the original Thirteen Colonies and ratified the Constitution of the United States on January 2, 1788. The early days were chaotic, with several gaps and schisms in the state's power structure, as the state capital of Savannah was captured during the American Revolutionary War. After independence was achieved, the office was solidly Democratic-Republican until the 1830s, when the office began to be contested by Democrats and Whigs for a few decades.

It seceded from the Union on January 19, 1861, and was a founding member of the Confederate States of America on February 4, 1861. Following the end of the American Civil War, Georgia during Reconstruction was part of the Third Military District, which exerted control over governor appointments and elections. During Reconstruction, it had two Republican governors. Georgia was then readmitted to the Union on July 25, 1868, expelled from Congress for failures in Reconstruction on March 3, 1869, and again readmitted on July 15, 1870. After the end of Reconstruction and the state was allowed to govern itself again, Democrats would be the only party elected for the next 131 years.

The longest-serving governors are George Busbee, Joe Frank Harris, Zell Miller, Sonny Perdue, and Nathan Deal, each of whom served two full four-year terms; Joseph E. Brown, governor during the Civil War, was elected four times, serving seven and a half years. The shortest term of the post-revolutionary period is that of Matthew Talbot, who served 13 days after succeeding his predecessor who died in office. One man, Eugene Talmadge, died before taking office in his third distinct term, leading to a dispute in which three people claimed the office.

=== Exceptions and omissions ===
The revolutionary government was thrown into disarray by the capture of Savannah in 1778, which led to several governments with varying levels of influence; they would reunite in 1780. The Official and Statistical Register of Georgia ignores the Council of Safety of William Ewen in favor of Archibald Bulloch's government, and omits the government of William Glascock and Seth John Cuthbert. The Register includes colonial governors in its numbering, listing Archibald Bulloch as the 7th governor.

=== Three governors controversy ===
In December 1946, Governor-elect Eugene Talmadge died before assuming office. Talmadge's son, Herman, was appointed governor by the State Legislature. This was challenged by the Lieutenant Governor-elect Melvin Thompson, who maintained that the state constitution authorized him to assume the office upon the death of the governor. Outgoing governor Ellis Arnall announced that he would not relinquish the office until it was clear who the new governor was. The political turmoil that ensued became known as the "three governors controversy". In January 1947, while all three governors occupied different portions of the State Capitol, Secretary of State Ben W. Fortson Jr., took the Great Seal of the State of Georgia and hid it. This prevented any of the claimants to the governorship from executing any business until the Supreme Court of Georgia could make a ruling on the rightful winner. Thompson was eventually declared "acting governor" until a special election could be held to fill the remainder of the original term. Herman Talmadge won the special election and served out the remaining portion of his father's term.

== Qualifications for office ==
According to Article V, Section I, Paragraph IV of the Georgia Constitution, to be eligible for the office of governor one needs to meet the following qualifications:

- Be at least thirty years of age when sworn in
- Be a resident of Georgia for at least six years immediately preceding the election
- Be a United States citizen for at least fifteen years before the election

== Election and term of office ==
=== Historical rules ===
Under Georgia's Rules and Regulations of 1776, considered by some to be the first constitution, the chief executive was a president chosen by the legislature every six months. This was quickly superseded by the 1777 constitution, which called for a governor to be chosen by the legislature each year, with a term limited to one year out of every three. The governor's term was lengthened to two years in the 1789 constitution, and an 1824 amendment provided for popular election of the governor. While the 1861 secessionist constitution kept the office the same, the 1865 constitution, following Georgia's surrender, limited governors to two consecutive terms of two years each, allowing them to serve again after a gap of four years. The Reconstruction constitution of 1868 increased the governor's term to four years. The 1877 constitution, after the end of Reconstruction, returned the office to the provisions of the 1865 constitution. An amendment in 1941 lengthened terms to four years, but governors could no longer succeed themselves, having to wait four years to serve again. The constitution does not specify when terms start, only that the governor is installed at the next session of the General Assembly. The current constitution of 1983 allows governors to succeed themselves once before having to wait four years to serve again.

=== Modern practice ===
The current constitution of 1983 allows governors to serve two terms in office before having to wait four years to serve again. The Constitution provides as follows:

"There shall be a Governor who shall hold office for a term of four years and until a successor shall be chosen and qualified. Persons holding the office of Governor may succeed themselves for one four-year term of office. Persons who have held the office of Governor and have succeeded themselves as hereinbefore provided shall not again be eligible to be elected to that office until after the expiration of four years from the conclusion of their term as Governor." Ga. Const. art. V, § I, para. I. "An election for Governor shall be held on Tuesday after the first Monday in November of 1986, and the Governor-elect shall be installed in office at the next session of the General Assembly. An election for Governor shall take place quadrennially thereafter on said date unless another date be fixed by the General Assembly. Said election shall be held at the places of holding general elections in the several counties of this state, in the manner prescribed for the election of members of the General Assembly, and the electors shall be the same." Ga. Const. art. V, § I, para. II.

This does mean that a governor and their lieutenant governor, if both in agreement and of enough popularity, could in theory serve an infinite number of terms each.

== Powers, duties, and authorities ==
According to the Constitution of Georgia, the governor:

- Exercises "chief executive powers" and "take care the laws are faithfully executed"
- Serves as the commander-in-chief of the Georgia National Guard
- Serves as the commander-in-chief of the Georgia State Defense Force, a professionally trained volunteer state defense force
- Calls the Georgia General Assembly into special session for purposes as the governor may provide by proclamation
- Exercises veto power on bills
- Issues writs of election for vacancies which occur in Congress
- May deliver a state of the state address to the General Assembly
- Suspends or removes officers under Article II, Section 3 of the Georgia Constitution (following the finding of an appointed commission)

The governor, by law, also has the authority to declare a state of emergency or disaster, suspend the collection of taxes, and generally enforce the laws of the state.

== Succession ==
Originally, in the event of a vacancy, the president of the executive council acted as governor. This was changed in 1798 to the president of the senate. The 1945 constitution created the office of lieutenant governor, who would act as governor if that office became vacant; Article V, Section 1, Paragraph V of the Constitution of Georgia provides a plan of succession in the event of the death or incapacitation of the Governor. The first successor would be the Lieutenant Governor, followed by the Speaker of the Georgia House of Representatives.

== Timeline ==
Timeline of Georgia governors

== See also ==
- First ladies of Georgia
- List of colonial governors of Georgia
