= List of former members of the Georgia Executive Council =

The following is a list of members of each session of the Georgia Executive Council from 1777 to 1789, when the council was replaced by the Georgia State Senate.

== List by session ==
=== 1777 (May 8-) ===
- Officers
  - Benjamin Andrew, President
  - Samuel Stirk, Secretary
- Burke
  - John Fulton
- Chatham
  - Jonathan Bryan
  - John Houstoun
  - George Basil Spencer (serving Sep. 26)
  - Charles Francis Chevalier (serving Sep. 26)
- Effingham
  - Thomas Chisholm
  - William Holzendorf
- Liberty
  - John Jones
  - Benjamin Andrew
  - William Peacock
- Richmond
  - Arthur Fort
- John Walton
- William Few
- Wilkes
  - John Coleman
  - John Lindsay

=== 1778 (Jan.) ===
- Officers
  - Richard Wylly, President
  - Samuel Stirk, Secretary
  - Robert Gray, Doorkeeper
  - Adam Eurick, Messenger
- Burke
  - John Fulton
  - David Lewis
- Chatham
  - Richard Wylly
  - William Maxwell
- Effingham
  - Jenkin Davis
  - John Keebler(?)
- Liberty
  - Samuel Miller
  - Charles Kent(?)
- Richmond
  - Chesley Bostwick
  - Charles Crawford
- Wilkes
  - John Lindsay
  - Holman Freeman

=== 1779 (Jan. 8-) ===
(Met at house of Mathew Hobson in Augusta, Jan. 8, 1779. Adjourned till the meeting of the next Convention.)

- Officers
  - William Glascock, President (Jan. 21-)
  - John Wilkinson, Secretary (Jan. 24-)
  - Daniel Danielly, Messenger (Jan. 24-)
- Richmond
  - Humphrey Wells

=== 1779 (July 24-) ===
("Supreme Executive Council." Met at house of John Wilson in Augusta, Saturday, July 24, 1779, at 4 o'clock P. M. Met at the Church Aug. 3, 1779, according to adjournment.)

- Officers
  - Seth John Cuthbert, President pro tempore (July 24-Aug. 6)
  - John Wereat, President (Aug. 6-)
  - Samuel Stirk, Secretary
  - Daniel Danielly, Messenger
- Burke
  - Myrick Davies
- Chatham
  - Joseph Clay
- Joseph Habersham
- Seth John Cuthbert
- Richmond
  - Humphrey Wells (surgeon)
  - William Few
- Wilkes
  - John Dooly
- Liberty?
  - John Wereat
- Liberty?
  - William Gibbons, Sr.

=== 1779 (Dec. 3-Jan. 7, 1780) ===
(Met in Augusta)

- Officers
  - Richard Howley, President
- Burke
  - John Twiggs
- Effingham
  - John Bilbo
- Liberty
  - Richard Howley (res. Jan. 3)
  - John Hardy
- Richmond
  - Robert Middleton
  - Humphrey Wells (surgeon)
- Wilkes
  - Micajah Williamson
  - Stephen Heard
  - James Brown

=== 1780 (Jan. 7-) ===
(Dr. Folliott, occupying the building in Augusta called the Glebe, ordered to vacate it on Jan. 8, 1780 for the accommodation of the Governor and Executive Council. Council adjourned Feb. 5, 1781) to meet at Heard'* Fort.)

- Officers
  - George Wells, President (Jan. 7-Feb. 15)
  - Stephen Heard, President (Feb. 18-)
  - Humphrey Wells, President pro tempore (Feb. 16-Feb. 18)
  - Samuel Stirk, Secretary
  - Daniel Danielly, Messenger
- Burke
  - Myrick Davies
  - Daniel McMurphy
- Chatham
  - Peter Deveaux
- Effingham
  - Caleb Howell
  - John Bilbo
- Richmond
  - Humphrey Wells (surgeon)
  - George Wells (killed in duel)
- Wilkes
  - Stephen Heard
  - John Lindsay
  - John Cunningham
- Chatham?
  - John Heard

=== 1781 (Aug. 17.) ===
(Met in Augusta; adjourned Oct. 9th to meet at Headquarters in Burke County. Met Oct. 16, 1781 at Howell's Plantation in Burke County; adjourned Oct. 26th to meet in Augusta on the following Tuesday, Oct. 30th.)

- Officers
  - Myrick Davies, President
- Burke
  - James Jones
  - Myrick Davies
- Chatham
  - Jonathan Bryan
  - Charles Odingsells
- Effingham
  - Abraham Ravot
  - Jenkin Davis
- Liberty
  - Joseph Woodruff
  - William Gibbons, Sr.
- Richmond
  - Humphrey Wells
  - Benjamin Riden (elected but no record of service)
- Wilkes
  - Daniel Coleman
  - Absalom Bidwell (elected but no record of service)

=== 1782 (Jan. 2-) ===
(Met in Augusta Jan. 2d; in Savannah July 14-Dec. 31, 1782.)

- Officers
  - Stephen Heard, President (res.)
  - Edward Jones, President (Aug. 30-)
  - Abraham Jones, Secretary
  - Seaborn Jones, Secretary (May 11-)
- Burke
  - Thomas Lewis, Sr. (res.)
  - Hugh Lawson, (res.)
  - William Lord (declined seat in House of Assembly)
  - Lemuel Lanier (elec. May 4)
  - Benjamin Lewis (elec. May 4)
- Chatham
  - Charles Odingsells
  - Jonathan Bryan
  - Peter Deveaux
- Effingham
  - Abraham Ravot
  - Jenkin Davis
  - Edward Jones (seated Aug. 12)
- Liberty
  - Joseph Woodruff (declared ineligible to seat in House of Assembly Apr. 22; non-resident)
  - Samuel Saltus (declined)
  - James Maxwell (res.)
  - Thomas Maxwell (elec. July 20)
  - Benjamin Andrew
- Richmond
  - Andrew Burns (res.)
  - Arthur Fort (Aug. 5-)
  - William Glascock
- Wilkes
  - Micajah Williamson (elec. July 20; declined)
  - John Lindsay (seated Aug. 7)
  - Stephen Heard
  - Holman Freeman

=== 1783 (Jan. 7-) ===
(Met in Savannah. Adjourned May 13 to meet in Augusta June 12th. Adjourned Aug. 2d to meet at Government House in Savannah Aug. 12th.)

- Officers
  - Jenkin Davis, President (elected Jan. 27)
  - David Rees, Secretary
  - John Riley, Messenger and Doorkeeper
- Burke
  - John Fulton
  - Benjamin Lewis
- Chatham
  - James Bryan
  - John Morel (Feb. 13-)
- Effingham
  - Jenkin Davis
  - William Holzendorf
- Liberty
  - John Elliott
  - James Stewart
  - Benjamin Andrew (seated Feb. 26; res. prior to July 15; served 33 days)
- Richmond
  - Zacharias Fenn
  - Charles Crawford (res. prior to July 15)
- Wilkes
  - Walton Harris
  - James Little (res. prior to July 15)

=== 1784 (Jan. 9-) ===
(Met in Savannah Jan. 9th. Met in Augusta July 13; adjourned July 30 to meet in Savannah; met there Aug. 10th. Adjourned Sep. 3d to meet in Augusta Sep. 10th; met Sep. 14th. Adjourned Oct. 1st to meet in Savannah; met Oct. 8th.)

- Officers
  - John Habersham, President
  - David Rees, Secretary
  - John Riley, Messenger and Doorkeeper
- Burke
  - John Green
  - John Fulton (Mar. 23-)
- Chatham
  - William Stephens
  - John Habersham
- Effingham
  - Jenkin Davis
  - John Spencer
- Liberty
  - James Powell
  - Philip Lowe (res. Feb. 17)
  - Benjamin Andrew (Feb. 26-)
- Richmond
  - Zacharias Fenn
  - James McNeil (declined)
  - Robert Middleton (declined)
  - James McFarland (Feb. 26-)
- Wilkes
  - George Walton
  - Daniel Coleman

=== 1785 ===
(Met in Savannah.)

- Officers
  - John Morel, President
  - George Handley, Secretary
- Burke
  - John Clements
  - Alexander Irvin
  - Chatham
  - John Morel
  - Richard Gwinn (died Jan. 1785)
  - Stephen Millen (Jan. 19-)
- Effingham
  - Jenkin Davit
  - John Spencer (declined)
  - John Green (Jan. 14-)
- Liberty
  - Benjamin Andrew, Sr.
  - Edward Summer (declined)
  - John Hardy (declined Feb. 20; re-elected Feb. 22)
- Richmond
  - Jesse Saunders
  - James Stalling! (declined)
  - Cornelius Dysart (declined)
  - Benjamin Porter (declined)
  - James McNeil (Jan. 12-)
- Wilkes
  - Stephen Heard (declined)
  - Elijah Clarke (declined)
  - John King (Jan. 13-)
  - William Moore (Feb. 22-)

=== 1786 (Jan. 16-) ===
(Met in Augusta.)

- Officers
  - Thomas Napier, President
  - Nathaniel Cocke, President pro tempore
  - George Handley, Secretary
  - Rd. Reynolds, Messenger and doorkeeper
- Burke
  - Thomas Lewis
  - John Green
  - David Emanuel (Feb. 14-)
  - Isaac Perry (Aug. 15-)
- Chatham
  - William Gibbons, Jr.
  - Charles Odingsells (res. in Feb.)
  - William O'Bryan, Jr. (Feb. 14-)
- Effingham
  - William Holzendorf
  - Jenkin Davis (res.)
  - John Green, Jr. (Aug. 15-)
  - Joseph Jackson (Aug. 15-)
  - Franklin Thomas Peter Carnes
  - Jesse Walton
- Liberty
  - Benjamin Andrew
  - James Powell (failed to qualify)
  - Nathan Brownson (Aug. 15-)
  - William Steele (Aug. 15-)
- Richmond
  - Thomas Napier
  - Nathaniel Cocke
- Washington
  - Robert Christmas
  - William Damell
- Wilkes
  - William Moss
  - John Talbot (failed to qualify)
  - Arthur Fort (declined)
  - Jeremiah Walker (Feb. 11-)

=== 1787 (Jan. 5-) ===
(Met in Augusta.)

- Officers
  - John Cobbs, President
  - James Meriwether, Secretary
  - George Devine, Messenger
  - John Temple, Messenger (app. prior to Mar. 22)
- Burke
  - Edmund Byne
  - William Green (died)
  - Joel Rees (Nov. 1-)
- Camden
  - Robert Montfort (res. Jan. 27)
  - James Armstrong (Feb. 13-)
  - Thomas Washington
  - Ferdinand O'Neal (vice Washington)
- Chatham
  - Josiah Tattnall, Jr.
  - James Gunn (declined)
  - James Moore (Jan. 19-)
  - Benjamin Fishbourne (Feb. 15-; vice Moore)
- Effingham
  - John Green
  - McKeen Green
  - Franklin Jesse Walton
  - Neil Cleveland
- Greene
  - Thomas Harris
  - David Love
  - Richard Worsham (Feb. 12-)
- Liberty
  - John Mclntosh, Jr.
  - Hepworth Carter (Jan. 18-Feb. 8, res.)
  - James Powell (vice Carter)
- Richmond
  - John Cobbs
  - Henry Allison
- Washington
  - John Barclay
  - Reuben Wilkinson
- Wilkes
  - Andrew Bums
  - William Moore (res.)
  - John King (Feb. 12-)

=== 1788 ===
(Met in Augusta.)

- Officers
  - William O'Bryan, President (elec. Jan. 8; declined Jan. 12)
  - George Handley, President (Jan. 15-)
  - Benjamin Fishbourne, President (Jan. 31-)
  - James Meriwether, Secretary
  - John Temple, Messenger and Doorkeeper (place declared vacant May 28; Temple absent without leave)
  - William Hall, Messenger and Doorkeeper (June 3-)
- Burke
  - John Peter Wagnon
  - Hugh Lawson
- Camden
  - James Armstrong (elec. Jan. 7; seated Aug. 19)
  - ................ Young (elected but no record of service)
- Chatham
  - William O'Bryan (declined)
  - Benjamin Maxwell (res. Jan. 25)
  - Benjamin Fishbourne (Jan. 31-)
  - Josiah Tattnall (declined)
  - Joseph Day (elec. Jan. 30; Council declared election unconstitutional; requested Assembly to select councillor from those present in House)
- Effingham
  - John Green
  - McKeen Green
  - Franklin Neil Cleveland
  - Middleton Woods
- Glynn
  - William Stevens (did not take seat in House)
  - George Handley (Jan. 15-)
  - John Tompkins (res.)
  - Christopher Hillary (Feb. 2-)
- Greene
  - Robert Middleton
  - William Daniell
- Liberty
  - Elihu Lyman
  - ................ Dunwoody (elected but no record of service)
- Richmond
  - William Flournoy Hooker
  - Joel Crawford, Sr.
- Washington
  - Thacker Vivion
  - Daniel Bankston
  - Alexander Irvin (Feb. 2-; vice Bankston)
- Wilkes
  - John Talbot
  - William Moss

=== 1789 ===
(Met in Augusta.)

- Officers
  - Hugh Lawson, President
  - William Hall, Messenger and Doorkeeper
- Burke
  - William Little
  - Hugh Lawson
- Camden
  - Abner Williams (did not serve)
  - John Alexander (elected but no record of service)
  - Jacob Weed (Jan. 21-; vice Williams)
  - Simeon Dillingham (elec. Feb. 4; seated May 9)
- Chatham
  - David Fisher
  - Thomas Gibbons
- Effingham
  - John Green
  - Joseph Jackson (did not serve)
  - Oliver Bowen (elec. Jan. 21; declined)
  - Israel Bird (elected Jan. 23, vice Bowen, but no record of service)
- Franklin
  - Middleton Woods
  - Neil Cleveland
- Glynn
  - James Spalding (did not serve)
  - Raymond Demere (declined)
  - Elisha B. Hopkins
  - Christopher Hillary
- Greene
  - Roberds Thomas
  - Rene Fitzpatrick
- Liberty
  - Elihu Lvman
  - James Powell (elected but no record of service)
  - Job Pray (Feb. 6-)
- Richmond
  - William Flournoy Booker
  - William Stevens (declined)
  - Henry Allison (died prior to July 7)
- Washington
  - John Watts (did not serve)
  - Daniel Bankston (declined)
  - Joshua Williams (Jan. 21-; vice Bankston)
  - Jared Irwin (elec. Feb. 4; seated Feb. 25; vice Watts)
- Wilkes
  - James Williams
  - Nathaniel Christmas
