= John Wereat =

American politician

Governor John Wereat
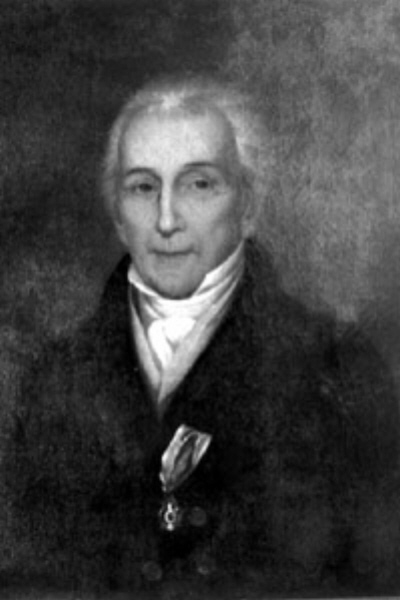

Governor of Georgia
- In office August 6, 1779 – January 4, 1780
- Preceded by: Seth John Cuthbert
- Succeeded by: George Walton

Personal details
- Born: John Wereat c. 1733 Rode, Somerset, England
- Died: January 25, 1799 (aged 65–66) Bryan County, Georgia, U.S.

John Wereat (c. 1733 – January 25, 1799) was an American politician and the governor of Georgia.

== Personal life ==
Wereat was born in Road (now Rode, Somerset) England, around 1733 and migrated to the colonies in 1759. He married Hannah Wilkinson, who was previously married. They arrived in Savannah in 1759, where Wereat partnered with William Handley, Hannah's relative.

== Political life ==
John Wereat was appointed to the Council of Georgia on April 14, 1766. In the early years of the American Revolution, Wereat was a member of the Provincial Congress and the Council of Safety. From 1776 through the end of the war, he served as Georgia's Continental agent, representing the state in dealings with Congress. Wereat was a delegate for Georgia in the Continental Congress and Governor of Georgia in 1779. During his term as governor, he fought against the Yazoo land fraud, organizing the Georgia Union Company in an attempt to buy western lands and prevent them from inclusion in the Yazoo sales. The Yazoo land fraud left a stain on Georgia politics for years, finally being resolved under the governorship of James Jackson.

Wereat spent a year as a prisoner of the British in Charleston, South Carolina after initially being taken captive in Augusta in 1780.

After his gubernatorial term, Wereat served as state auditor from 1782 until 1793. In December 1787 he presided over the state convention that unanimously ratified the new Federal Constitution.

John Wereat was in the Whig party along with John Martin and Lyman Hall.

== Death and legacy ==
John Wereat died at his Bryan County, Georgia plantation on January 25, 1799.

His daughter Ann, married Continental Army Major Benjamin Fishbourn, the Aide-de-camp to General Anthony Wayne. Fishbourn was the first-ever politician rejected by the Senate under the first ever instance of senatorial courtesy.

== See also ==
- List of United States governors born outside the United States

Political offices
Preceded by John Houstoun	Governor of Georgia; 1779	Succeeded by George Walton
