= Benjamin Fishbourn =

American soldier and first rejected federal nominee (1759–1790)

- Born: January 4, 1759; Philadelphia, Pennsylvania
- Died: November 8, 1790 (aged 31); Mount Hope, Georgia
- Military career
- Allegiance: United States of America
- Rank: Major
- Conflicts: American Revolution

Benjamin Fishbourn (January 4, 1759 – November 8, 1790) was an American soldier during the American Revolution and Aide-de-Camp to General Anthony Wayne. He was also the first ever Presidential nominee rejected by the Senate, also being the first instance of Senatorial courtesy.

== Early life ==
Fishbourn was born on January 4, 1759 in Philadelphia, Pennsylvania to William and Mary Tallman Fishbourn.

== Military career ==
In 1776, Benjamin Fishbourn was made Paymaster of the Second Pennsylvania Battalion for the Continental Army in the American Revolutionary War. He served in the Continental Army with the First, Second, and Fourth Regiments of Pennsylvania. Later, he served as Aide-de-camp to General Anthony Wayne, which position he held for four years.

On January 3, 1777, he was made Captain of the Fourth Pennsylvania Regiment.

On February 17, 1779, he became the Aide-de-camp to General Wayne. He was promoted to a Major and served as the subordinate to General Wayne until 1783.

== Incident at the home of Abraham Van Neste ==
In 1779, Fishbourn was staying at the home of Abraham Van Neste during the American Revolutionary War, with Brigadier General Anthony Wayne and his Wayne's other subordinate soldiers. During their stay at the house, there was a confrontation that required legal assistance, which was brought to the attention of General George Washington.

On January 25, 1779, Major Benjamin Fishbourn, and Samuel Wright had their sleeping quarters in the same room as Van Nest. They went up the stairs to find the room locked and started an argument with Van Neste. Van Nest apparently threatened to shoot Fishbourn and he assaulted Van Neste in return.

The next morning, on January 26, 1779, Peter Davis, the Somerset County Constable, attempted to serve a warrant on Fishbourn and Wright for their arrests as a result of the assault. General Wayne prevented the constable from serving the warrant and asked to see the warrant. Brig. Gen. Wayne ordered his subordinate, Samuel Wright to remove the Constable.

On March 9, 1779, New Jersey Governor William Livingston brought the incident to the attention of General George Washington. On March 16, 1779, General Washington wrote to Brig. Gen. Wayne and instructed him to return with Major Fishbourne and address the issue with the court. In a letter to General Washington, dated March 23, 1779, Brig. Gen. Wayne claimed that he was concerned when the constable would not show the warrant to him and was worried about the possibility of him being a spy.

== After the war ==
Fishbourn moved to Georgia following the conclusion of the American Revolution, becoming a large landowner in the state. He served in the Georgia Legislature. Fishbourn was serving as a customs officer in Savannah, Georgia, as well. On February 2, 1788, he was chosen by the Legislature Counselor for Chatham County, Georgia as the President of the Honorable Executive Council of Georgia.

In 1788, Fishbourn, and Wayne on Fishbourn's behalf, requested that President George Washington name him as a Naval Officer in Savannah, Georgia.

In 1789, FIshbourn was named Naval Officer of Georgia in Savannah, Georgia by the Georgia Governor. He was hoping to serve in the same role in the federal government. On May 10, 1789, General Wayne wrote to President Washington in support of Fisbourn for the position.

== Rejection as naval officer ==
On August 3, 1789, President George Washington nominated Fishbourn as a naval officer in Savannah as a member of the federal customs service (along with all of Washington's other nominations). On August 5, 1789, the United States Senate rejected Fishbourn's appointment, becoming the first ever rejection of a presidential nominee and has been deemed the first instance of Senatorial courtesy, which is when senators defer to their fellow senators that object to an individual nominated to serve in their own state.

This instance was the first-ever incident where one of President Washington's nominations was rejected. Upon learning of the rejection, Washington went to the Senate Chamber in Federal Hall to inquire about the rejection and express his dismay. Senator James Gunn took responsibility for the rejection. Gunn was able to convince his other senators to go along with his rejection and they agreed as a courtesy, which "senatorial courtesy" is still in practice today.

Gunn told Washington that he did not owe an explanation for the Senate's rejection. Washington accepted the rejection and instead nominated Lachlan McIntosh. In accepting the decision without fighting it, Washington reasoned, “for as the president has a right to nominate without assigning his reasons, so has the Senate a right to dissent without giving theirs.”

While he did accept the Senate's decision, Washington still expressed his advocacy for Fishbourn. He noted Fisbourn's good demeanor while serving in the army with Washington; that he had been elected to the Georgia legislature; and that he must have been well-liked by his fellow soldiers to have attained his rank in the army.

The Senate adopted a new Resolution, stating "advice, and consent to the appointment of Officers should be given in the presence of the President." It then appointed a three-person committee to confer with Washington regarding the mode of communication between the Senate and President regarding the President's formation of treaties and appointment of officers.

General Wayne defended his former subordinate and on August 30, 1789, he sent a letter to President Washington, signed by several prominent people from Savannah, expressing support for Fishbourn and expressing that Gunn's rejection was without merit.

On 25, September 1789, Fishbourn sent his own letter to President Washington in support of himself. President Washington sent a reply through his secretary, Major William Jackson, stating that President Washington “does not consider himself competent to give any opinion on the subject."

=== Theories on Gunn's rejection of Fishbourn ===
The exact reason for Fishbourn's rejection is not certain, but it may be due to a bad relationship between Senator Gunn and Fishbourn. In 1785, four years prior to the nomination, Fishbourn apparently gave his support to Nathanael Greene in a failed duel between Greene and Senator Gunn. Senator Gunn, while an army captain believed that Major General Nathanael Greene had disparaged him and challenged Greene to a duel, which Greene refused. Gunn was still mad and stated he was going to attack Greene anyway and started carrying dueling pistols with him in case he ran into Greene. Greene was not concerned and even had President Washington's support that his honor was good after refusing the duel. Fishbourn also apparently took Greene's side, which Senator Gunn never forgot.

The reason for the disagreement between Greene and Gunn dates back to the war. Greene was a Major General in the army and Gunn was a Captain in the Continental army. Gunn had used a valuable horse he had received during the war and traded in for two other horses and a slave. Greene demanded a military court to investigate the incident. The military court ruled for Gunn, but Greene still required Gunn to return the horse and submitted the matter to the Continental Congress. The Continental Congress agreed with Greene and ordered Gunn to replace the original horse with an equally valuable one. They both moved to the Savannah, Georgia area after the war, which is when Gunn challenged Greene to a duel.

General Wayne did not believe that Senator Gunn had issues with Fishbourn himself for the duel, but was rejecting Fishbourn as a way to slight Wayne. He called it a "false, Malignant, and invidious" attack on himself. Senator Gunn and Fishbourn both served under Wayne during the war.

A letter published in The Georgia Gazette revealed that Senator Robert Morris had supported Fishbourn's nomination and requested that Gunn specify his exact reasons for the rejection. Gunn replied that it was nothing personal, except "personal invective and abuse."

Another theory promulgated is that Senator Gunn simply had another candidate in mind that he preferred.

Whatever the reason, the Senate's rejection of Fishbourn left a lasting precedent. Senatorial courtesy is still in practice today.

== Family and death ==
Fishbourne was married on December 10, 1783 to Annie Wereat, in Georgia. Annie was the daughter of Georgia Governor, John Wereat. They had 3 children who all died young (although one may have lived to later adulthood).

Fishbourn's brother-in-law was Thomas Wharton Jr., the first President of the Pennsylvania Supreme Executive Council. Wharton was married to Benjamin Fishbourn's sister, Elizabeth (Fishbourn) Wharton.

He was in the Society of the Cincinnati and was an original member in the Pennsylvania Society of Cincinnati and Georgia Society of Cincinnati.

Fishbourne died on November 8, 1790 in Mount Hope, Georgia. Mount Hope was the Columbia County, Georgia plantation of his father-in-law John Wereat, the de facto governor of Georgia during the American Revolution.
