= James Gunn (Georgia politician) =

American politician (1753–1801)

United States Senator from Georgia
- In office March 4, 1789 – March 3, 1801
- Preceded by: Position established
- Succeeded by: James Jackson

Personal details
- Born: March 13, 1753 Virginia, British America
- Died: July 30, 1801 (aged 48) Louisville, Georgia, U.S.

Military service
- Allegiance: United States
- Branch/service: Georgia Militia
- Years of service: 1775-1783, 1792–1801
- Rank: Brigadier general
- Unit: 1st Continental Dragoons
- Battles/wars: American Revolutionary War

James Gunn (March 13, 1753 – July 30, 1801) was a delegate to the Continental Congress and a United States Senator from Georgia.

== Early life ==
Gunn was born in Virginia to John and Sarah Gunn and became a lawyer. Gunn served in the 1st Continental Dragoons during the Revolutionary War. He moved to Georgia after the war and became a significant political figure in his new home, establishing himself in short order as a planter, magistrate, state legislator, and militia officer, where he rose to brigadier general in the 1st Brigade of the Georgia militia in 1792. He owned slaves.

== Political life ==
Between 1782 and 1786, Gunn unsuccessfully challenged retired Gen. Nathanael Greene to a duel, assailed Georgia Revolutionary War hero James Jackson in the press, and defeated Gen. Anthony Wayne for one of Georgia's First U.S. Senate seats in January 1789. Gunn was selected as a delegate to the Continental Congress in 1787 but never attended sessions.

In his first term as senator, between mid-May and late June 1789, Gunn moved from opposing the establishment of excise taxes to supporting them. He also opposed giving the president the power to remove heads of cabinet departments without the advice and consent of the Senate. The administration negotiated the Treaty of New York (1790) with the Creek Indians, which greatly angered many in Georgia. Gunn voted against the treaty. Like no other senator, Gunn impacted the internal processes in the Senate and the relationship between the executive and legislative branches of the newly formed government during his first term in office.

In August 1789, Gunn set precedence, when he effectively became the first Senator to invoke Senatorial courtesy, when he convinced the other senators to go along with his objection of President George Washington's nomination of Benjamin Fishbourn to a federal position in the Port of Savannah, Georgia. He refused to provide Washington with any reason for the rejection and precedent was set that Senators could reject Presidential nominations without reason and also the precedence of senatorial courtesy was set, which is still in practice today.

Gunn's rivalry with James Jackson, which had originated in Georgia in the period between the end of the Revolution and the launching of the new federal government, heated up in the early 1790s. Gunn was a Federalist, and Jackson was a Jeffersonian. Gunn supported the formation of the Georgia Company and the sale of the Yazoo lands. In the aftermath of the Yazoo sale, Gunn acted quickly to complete the transaction and protect it in Washington, while Jackson tried to block the completion of the sale. On June 24, 1795, Gunn voted in favor of the Jay Treaty, one of only two southern senators to do so. James Jackson voted against it. Jackson resigned from the Senate and returned to Georgia to work against Gunn, who fell in public opinion due to the Yazoo land fraud.

Gunn was re-elected in 1795 and served out his second term until March 1801.

== Death and legacy ==
Gunn died in Louisville, Georgia, and is buried in a Revolutionary War cemetery in Louisville. A World War II Liberty ship, the SS James Gunn, ATS-0044 was built in 1942 and named for him.

== See also ==
List of Liberty ships: G-Je

== Notes ==
U.S. Senate
Preceded by Office created	U.S. senator (Class 3) from Georgia; 1789–1801; Served alongside: William Few, James Jackson, George Walton, Josiah Tattnall, Abraham Baldwin	Succeeded by James Jackson
