= Joseph Marie Servan de Gerbey =

French general

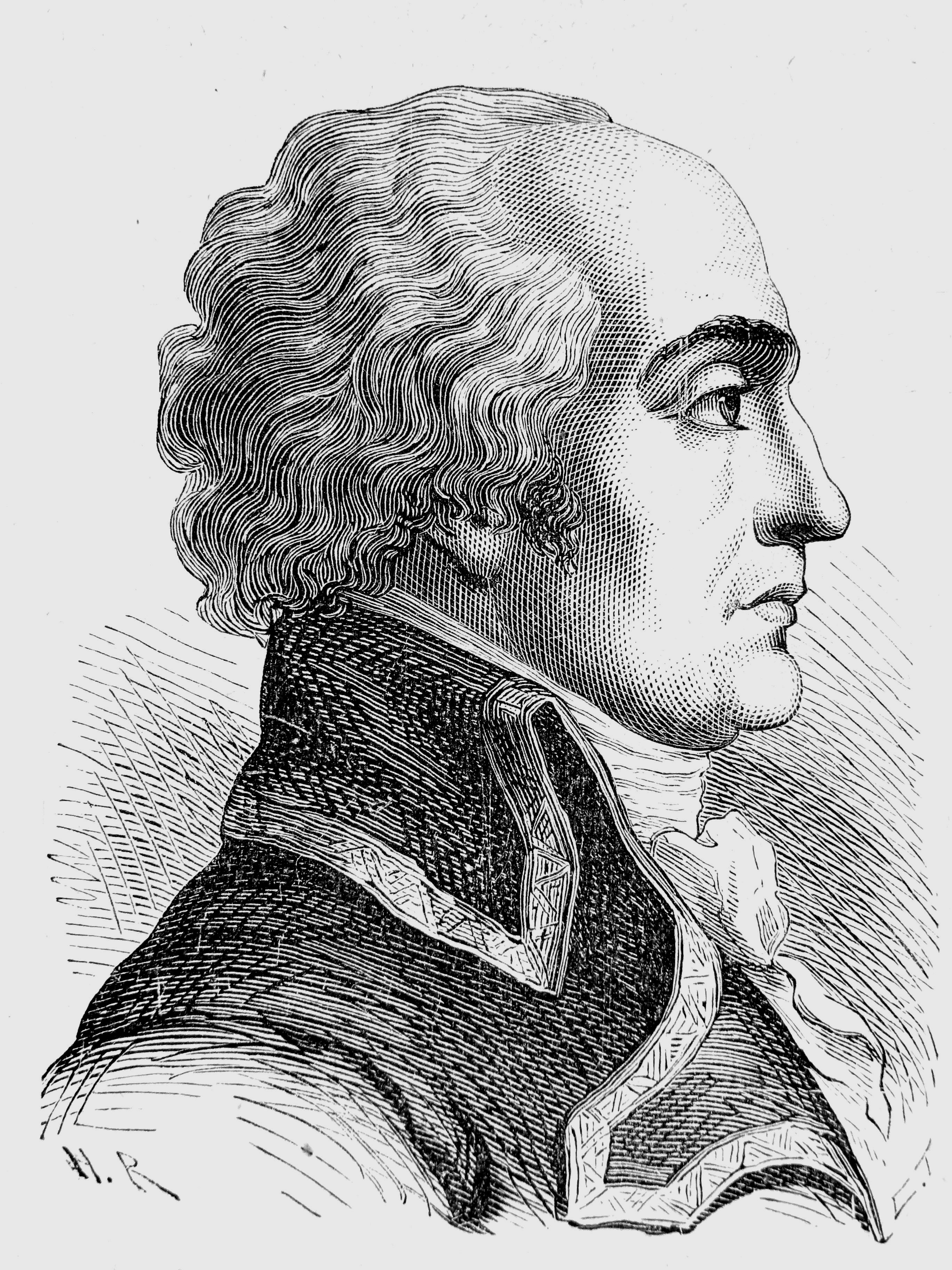
Joseph Servan (Album du Centenaire)

Joseph Marie Servan de Gerbey (French pronunciation: [ʒozɛf maʁi sɛʁvɑ̃ də ʒɛʁbɛ]; 14 February 1741 – 10 May 1808) was a French general. During the French Revolution he served twice as Minister of War and briefly led the Army of the Western Pyrenees. His surname is one of the names inscribed under the Arc de Triomphe, on Column 33.

== Biography ==
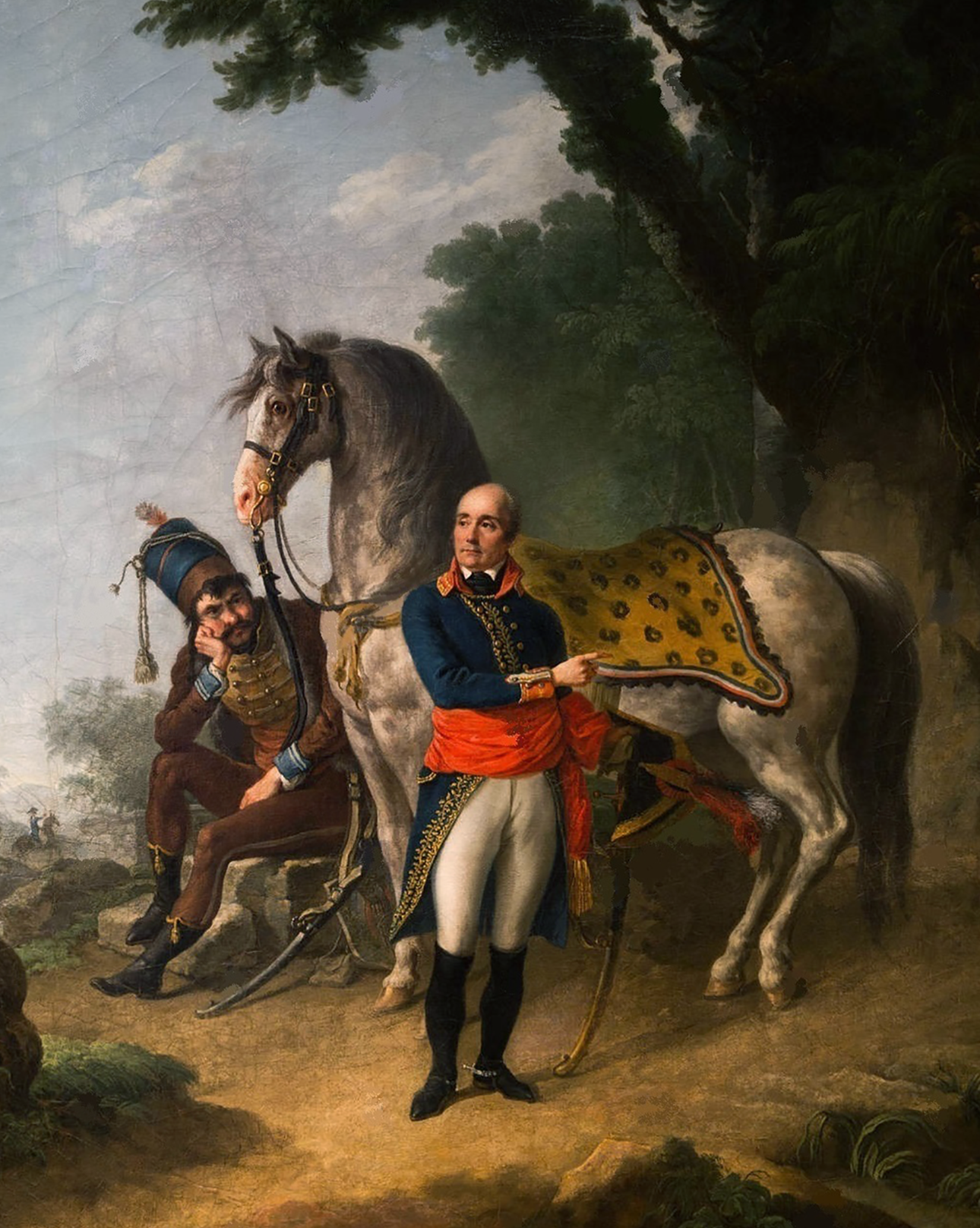
General Servan de Gerbey by Louis Lafitte

Servan was born in the village of Romans in south-eastern France. His older brother was the lawyer and publicist Joseph Michel Antoine Servan.

He volunteered for the regiment of Guyenne on 20 December 1760. He rose to Engineering Officer, then Deputy Governor of the pages of King Louis XVI, then colonel, then brigadier general on 8 May 1792.

He was recommended as Minister of War by the Girondin leadership, and served a brief term from 9 May to 12 June 1792. Servan assumed the office in a time of war, the first year of the War of the First Coalition. Within days of his appointment he oversaw the dismissal of the royal Garde du Corps and the Swiss Guards; he also abolished corporal punishment in the army.

His most momentous action as minister, however, was his proposal to bring armed volunteers from the provinces to Paris. These citizen-soldiers, called fédérés, were intended to complement the grand festivities set for the anniversary of the fall of the Bastille. Servan also planned to give them military training before using them to supplement the army at the front. The scope and length of their stay in the capital was undefined, and the proposal was highly contentious: some, like the king, saw it as a plot to stack Paris full with anti-monarchists, while others, like Maximilien Robespierre, feared the outsiders might be used as a provincial counterweight to the radical Parisian sans-culottes.

King Louis used his constitutional prerogative to veto Servan's proposal. Amid much criticism for his use of the unpopular veto power, the king fought back and dismissed the entire Girondin ministry, including Servan. Radical agitators seized the issue, and the invitation to the fédérés ignited a storm of citywide unrest. Eventually thousands of the provincial volunteers arrived regardless of the king's disapproval, and they were given a warm welcome by members of the Assembly, including Robespierre himself. The fédérés issue helped lead to the insurrection of 10 August after which Servan was reappointed as Minister of War.

Another of Servan's ministerial initiatives was the deletion of the eighth verse of the anthem La Marseillaise in 1792. Servan claimed its references to God undermined the Republic.

Arrested during the Terror, he was released on 3 February 1795 and reinstated in the army. Under the Consulate, he was Chairman of Records as well as Commander of the Legion of Honor.

Servan retired on 3 May 1807, and died the following year in Paris at the age of 67. His name in inscribed on the Arc de Triomphe, on the west side.

== Sources ==
- Schama, Simon (1989). Citizens: A Chronicle of the French Revolution. New York: Vintage. ISBN 0-679-72610-1.
- Soboul, Albert (1975). The French Revolution 1787–1799. New York: Vintage. ISBN 0-394-71220-X.

Political offices
Preceded by Pierre Marie de Grave	Minister of War; 9 May 1792 – 13 June 1792	Succeeded by Charles Dumouriez
Preceded by Charles Franqueville d'Abancourt	Minister of War; 10 August 1792 – 3 October 1792	Succeeded by Pierre Henri Hélène Marie Lebrun-Tondu
