= Blue slip (U.S. Senate) =

Legislative procedure in the United States Senate

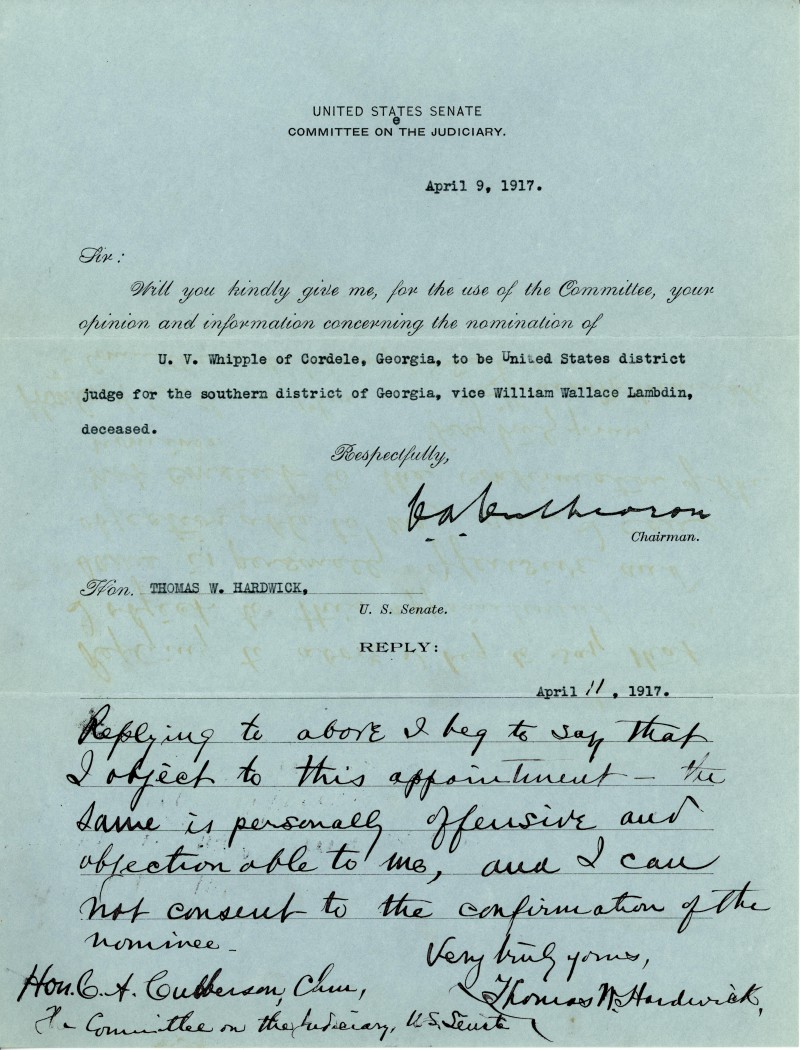
A Senate blue slip from 1917 for U.V. Whipple, a candidate for district judge for the southern district of Georgia, signed by Georgia Senator Thomas Hardwick, who wrote that "I object to this appointment—[Whipple] is personally offensive and objectionable to me, and I can not consent to the confirmation of the nominee."

In the United States Senate, a "blue slip" is a form used by the Senate Judiciary Committee to request the views of home-state senators on a presidential nominee for a federal judgeship or, in some cases, a U.S. attorney position in their state. The blue slip process can serve as a significant political tool, allowing a single senator to delay or (in practice) block a nomination.

== Overview ==
In the Senate, a blue slip is an opinion written by a senator from the state where a federal judicial nominee resides. Both senators from a nominee's state are sent a blue slip in which they may submit a favorable or unfavorable opinion of a nominee. They may also choose not to return a blue slip. The Senate Judiciary Committee takes blue slips into consideration when deciding whether or not to recommend that the Senate confirm a nominee.

== History ==
A report issued by the Congressional Research Service in 2003 defines six periods in the use of the blue slip by the Senate:

- From 1917 through 1955: The blue-slip policy allowed home-state senators to state their objections while committee action would move forward on a nomination. If a senator objected to his/her home-state nominee, the committee would report the nominee adversely to the Senate, where the contesting senator would have the option of stating his/her objections to the nominee before the Senate would vote on confirmation.
- From 1956 through 1978: A single home-state senator could stop all committee action on a judicial nominee by either returning a negative blue slip or failing to return a blue slip to the committee. This originated when segregationist Senator James Eastland of Mississippi allowed nominations to be killed to prevent school integration.
- From 1979 to mid-1989: A home-state senator's failure to return a blue slip would not necessarily prevent committee action on a nominee.
- From mid-1989 through June 5, 2001: In a public letter (1989) on the committee's blue-slip policy, the chairman wrote that one negative blue slip would be "a significant factor to be weighed" but would "not preclude consideration" of a nominee "unless the Administration has not consulted with both home state Senators." The committee would take no action, regardless of presidential consultation, if both home-state senators returned negative blue slips.
- From June 6, 2001, to 2003: The chairman's blue-slip policy allowed movement on a judicial nominee only if both home-state senators returned positive blue slips to the committee. If one home-state senator returned a negative blue slip, no further action would be taken on the nominee.

Since 2003, blue slip policy has changed several more times, as follows:

- 2003 to 2007: A return of a negative blue slip by one or both home-state senators does not prevent the committee from moving forward with the nomination — provided that the Administration has engaged in pre-nomination consultation with both of the home-state senators.
- 2007 to January 3, 2018: The chairman's blue-slip policy allowed movement on a judicial nominee only if both home-state senators returned positive blue slips to the committee. If one home-state senator returned a negative blue slip, no further action would be taken on the nominee.
- January 3, 2018, to present: The lack of two positive blue slips will not necessarily preclude a circuit-court nominee from receiving a hearing unless the White House failed to consult with home-state senators. Hearings are unlikely for district court nominees without two positive blue slips.

In October 2017, Senate Majority Leader Mitch McConnell announced that he believed blue slips should not prevent committee action on a nominee. In November 2017, the Chairman of the Senate Judiciary Committee, Chuck Grassley, announced that the committee would hold hearings for David Stras and Kyle Duncan. Stras's hearing was held up by Senator Al Franken's refusal to return his blue slip, while Duncan's hearing was held up by Senator John Neely Kennedy's indecision on his blue slip. Kennedy, however, consented to Duncan receiving a hearing.

In February 2019, attorney Eric Miller was confirmed to serve on the Ninth Circuit Court of Appeals, despite the fact that neither of his two home-state senators (Patty Murray and Maria Cantwell, both of Washington) had returned blue slips for him. He was the first federal judicial nominee to be confirmed without support from either of his home-state senators, although other nominees were similarly confirmed to the Courts of Appeals without blue slips later in 2019, including Paul Matey (Third Circuit, New Jersey), Joseph F. Bianco and Michael H. Park (both Second Circuit, New York), and Kenneth K. Lee, Daniel P. Collins, and Daniel Bress (all Ninth Circuit, California). By the end of Trump's term, 17 judges were appointed despite resistance from at least one senator of that state. In the Biden presidency, the Democratic-led Senate did not return to the blue slip, but only six appellate judges were confirmed with opposition. In the closing months of the 118th United States Congress (2024), multiple Democrats signaled a willingness to return to the policy before the next Congress convenes with some reluctant concurrence by senior Republicans.

In November 2022, President Biden nominated District Attorney Scott Colom for the United States District Court for the Northern District of Mississippi. Mississippi Senator Cindy Hyde-Smith did not return her blue slip, thus blocking the nomination. Colom went on to unseat Hyde-Smith in the 2026 U.S. Senate election in Mississippi.

In his second term, President Trump called for Senator Grassley to cease respecting the "old and outdated 'custom'" in order to allow him to appoint Republican judges and U.S. Attorneys in states with a Democratic senator. In response, Chairman Grassley defended the tradition, adding that Senator Durbin's respect of the blue slip tradition during his time as Chairman "kept 30 liberals off [the] bench" in Republican states that President Trump could later fill with conservative judges.

In November 2026, several Republican senators opposed judicial nominees selected by President Trump, citing concerns over insufficient consultation with home-state senators. Senator Alan Armstrong withdrew his previously favorable blue slip for nominee Zach West, while Senator John Cornyn withheld support for T. Elliot Gaiser.

== See also ==
- Senatorial courtesy
- Senate hold
