= Seth John Cuthbert =

American politician (1739–1797)

Governor of Georgia
- In office July 24, 1779 – August 6, 1779
- Preceded by: William Glascock
- Succeeded by: John Wereat

Personal details
- Born: 1739 Savannah, Georgia
- Died: August 23, 1797 (aged 57–58)

Seth John Cuthbert (1739 – August 23, 1797) briefly served as the Chairman of the Supreme Executive Council (governor) of Georgia during the American Revolution. He was born in Savannah, Georgia in 1739. His first marriage was to Catherine (Kitty) Eustace, she was previously married to Dr. James Blair in Williamsburg, VA. (He was the son of John Blair Sr. and she was the sister of John Skey Eustace.) The marriage was never consummated and ended in a court battle known as Blair v Blair. Dr. James Blair died before a divorce could be sought and she fought to receive her marriage portion. Catherine Blair died in the 1780s. He remarried Mary Clay, daughter of Joseph Clay in 1785 and was the father of John Alfred Cuthbert and Alfred Cuthbert. Cuthbert also fought in the American Revolution. He later became state treasurer (1784-1786), and served on the Council of Safety. He died on August 23, 1797, aged approximately 58.

Political offices
| Preceded by William Glascock | President of the Georgia Supreme Executive Council; 1779 | Succeeded by John Wereat and George Walton (Separate factions)^{1} |
Notes and references
1. New Georgia Encyclopedia
