= Senate hold =

Parliamentary procedure permitted in the U.S. Senate

In the United States Senate, a hold is a parliamentary procedure permitted by the Standing Rules of the United States Senate which allows one or more Senators to prevent a motion to proceed with consideration of a certain manner from reaching a vote on the Senate floor, as no motion may be brought for consideration on the Senate floor without unanimous consent (unless cloture is invoked on the said motion).

If the Senator provides notice privately to their party leadership of their intent (and the party leadership agrees), then the hold is known as a secret or anonymous hold. If the Senator objects on the Senate floor or the hold is publicly revealed, then the hold is more generally known as a Senatorial hold.

== Origin and intent ==
Sections 2 and 3 of Rule VII (Morning Business) of the Standing Rules of the Senate outline the procedure for bringing motions to the floor of the Senate. Under these rules, "no motion to proceed to the consideration of any bill...shall be entertained...unless by unanimous consent." In practice, this means that a senator may privately provide notice to their party leadership of intent to object to a motion. The leadership can more easily schedule business if they know in advance which unanimous consent requests are likely to receive objection.

The original intent of these sections was to protect a senator's right to be consulted on legislation that affected the senator's state or in which a senator had a great interest. The ability to place a hold would allow that senator an opportunity to study the legislation and to reflect on its implications before moving forward with further debate and voting.

According to Congressional Research Service research, holds were not common until the 1970s, when they became more common due to a less collegial atmosphere and an increasing use of unanimous consent to move business to the floor.

Holds, like filibusters, can be defeated through a successful cloture motion. However, the time required to bring around a cloture vote often allows fewer than 40 senators to block unimportant legislation when the majority is not willing to force the vote. The countermeasure to excessive holds may be increased determination on the part of the leadership to bring up measures despite holds, but the delay involved in cloture votes constrains the leader's ability to do this.

In 2023 the Congressional Research service estimated that even with cloture motions, approvals would average 2.6 hours each if there is not unanimous consent (720 hours for 273 nominations).

In 2025 the Senate changed its rules to allow votes without unanimous consent, except for judges and the cabinet.

== Controversy ==
In August 2006, the Federal Funding Accountability and Transparency Act of 2006 was put on secret hold. This bill, intended to encourage transparency within government, was considered by political pundits to be an especially ironic target of a secret hold and much attention was drawn to the bill and to the procedure itself. Bloggers and political activists sought to identify the senator or senators responsible by process of elimination, by having constituents contact each senator and requesting a specific on-the-record denial of placing the secret hold. Within 24 hours, 96 senators had explicitly denied that they had placed the secret hold, leaving only 4 senators still suspected and under growing public scrutiny as a result. On August 30, a spokesperson for Senator Ted Stevens of Alaska announced that Stevens had placed a hold on the bill. On August 31, 2006, Senator Robert Byrd also admitted placing a hold on the bill. Ultimately, the bill passed the Senate unanimously.

During the 110th Congress, Senator Tom Coburn put holds on a significant number of bills, raising the ire of the leadership and forcing them to package many of the bills with holds into one Omnibus Act (the so-called "Tomnibus") at the beginning of the 111th Congress. Some senators—such as Senators Ron Wyden and Jeff Merkley, both Democrats representing Oregon—have complained that the hold system makes it too easy to block legislation and that the leadership should not honor holds on the floor unless the senator is personally there to object.

During the 118th Congress, Senator Tommy Tuberville put holds on all military promotions and nominees because he opposed the Department of Defense policy to reimburse travel expenses for military personnel who have to leave their states to get abortions or other reproductive care. Secretary of Defense Lloyd Austin has criticized him for the risks posed to national security by leaving hundreds of military posts vacant. On December 19, Tuberville lifted the hold on all remaining officers, ending the matter.

== Attempts to amend or abolish the rule ==
Throughout the history of the Senate, multiple unsuccessful attempts have been made to abolish this practice. Common reforms which have been discussed include time limits on holds, requirements that a hold not cover a wide variety of business, publication of holds, or needing more than one senator to place a hold.

The practice was successfully banned in 1997, but only temporarily. Majority leader Trent Lott and minority leader Tom Daschle altered the rule so that anyone intending to hold a bill had to notify the bill's sponsor and the chair of the appropriate committee. That year, the result was that opponents of a bill would wait until the bill was before the entire Senate before announcing their opposition, wasting time and ultimately delaying other popularly supported legislation in the process. The practice was soon re-instituted.

Enacted on September 14, 2007, the Honest Leadership and Open Government Act of 2007 amended the Senate rules to require public notice of holds within 6 session days.

On April 22, 2010, 69 senators signed a letter to Senate Leaders Reid and McConnell pledging that they would not place secret holds on legislation or nominations, and requesting changes in Senate rules to end the practice.

On January 27, 2011, the Senate voted 92–4 to pass a resolution that would require any hold to be entered into the Congressional Record two days after it is placed, unless the hold is lifted within the two-day period. If the senator that placed the hold does not come forward or remove the hold within the two-day period, the hold will be attributed to the party leader, or the senator that placed the hold on behalf of the secret Senator.

== Attempts to evade loss of anonymity ==
Since U.S. Senate rules require the entering of the senator's name into the public record after two days, senators commonly circumvent the limit by using what is called a 'tag-team' on a hold. 'Tag-Teaming' a hold requires at least two senators that want to hold the legislation indefinitely. The first senator (anonymously) places a hold on the legislation, and then, before their name is entered into the record, releases the hold. The second senator then places an (anonymous/secret) hold on the legislation and repeats the action, releasing their hold before the 2-day window is up. The first senator then takes over the hold, and the process repeats itself indefinitely.

Although a hold is placed anonymously, the identity of the senator placing the hold can quickly become common knowledge. Under traditional dictates of Senate courtesy, the identity of the holder is not made public. However, senators have become increasingly willing to identify colleagues who place holds, in all but name.

== See also ==
- Blue Slip
- Senatorial courtesy
