= Pierre Marie de Grave =

- Born: 27 September 1755; Paris, France
- Died: 16 January 1823 (aged 67) Paris, France
- Allegiance: Kingdom of France; Kingdom of the French
- Branch: French Army
- Rank: Brigadier general
- Awards: Order of Saint Louis
- Other work: Minister of War (1792)

Pierre Marie, Marquis de Grave (27 September 1755 – 16 January 1823) was the French Minister of War in 1792, from 9 March to 9 May.

== Bibliography ==
- Holland, Elizabeth Vassal Fox; Giles Stephen Holland (1908). The Journal of Elizabeth Lady Holland (1791-1811). Harvard University: Longmans, Green & Co.

Political offices
Preceded by Louis, comte de Narbonne-Lara	Minister of War; 9 March 1792 – 9 May 1792	Succeeded by Joseph Marie Servan de Gerbey
