= Senatorial courtesy =

Unofficial rule in the U.S. Senate

Senatorial courtesy is a long-standing constitutional convention in the U.S., describing the tendency of U.S. senators to support a Senate colleague opposing the appointment to federal office of a nominee from that senator's state. The practice is motivated by a general sense of collegiality among senators and the assumption that a Senate colleague will have the best first-hand knowledge of the personal character and qualifications of a nominee from the senator's own state. It is also viewed as an "important source of political patronage" for U.S. senators.

== Procedure ==
This custom generally affords each senator some role in the process of nomination and confirmation of federal office holders, conditional on a matching political party affiliation between the president and the senator. Where each is of the same political party, the president will consult the senator prior to submitting a nomination for any federal posting geographically tied to that senator's state. Such consultation can help the president avoid a politically costly and embarrassing rejection of the nominee.

This consultation can be one of soliciting the senator for recommendations regarding whom the president should nominate, whereby the senator can reward political supporters from their state who are qualified for the position, or of quietly seeking the senator's advance approval or rejection of a nominee the president already has in mind for the vacancy prior to making that nomination. As United States attorney general Robert F. Kennedy described the practice, "Basically, it's senatorial appointment with the advice and consent of the president."

While not afforded the advisory role given to senators of the president's party, the blue slip policy of the Senate Judiciary Committee guarantees that even senators of the opposition party receive at least a consultative role regarding appointments of federal district and appellate court judges, U.S. attorneys, and federal marshals whose jurisdictions are geographically tied to the senator's state.

== History ==
The precedent that developed into senatorial courtesy began with the nomination by President George Washington of Benjamin Fishbourn to the post of naval officer for the port of Savannah, Georgia. Given the infancy of the U.S. federal government and the need to populate the executive offices, the Senate had previously given prompt consent to the president's nominations. But when the Senate debated Fishbourn's nomination, both senators from Georgia objected, with Senator James Gunn rising to speak against the nomination—likely because of his own personal animosities toward the nominee. Consequently, the Senate deferred to Gunn, rejecting the nomination.

Senatorial courtesy generally does not apply in the appointment of justices of the Supreme Court of the United States. However, that has not prevented some U.S. senators from using the custom to successfully block Supreme Court nominees from their state. During the second administration of President Grover Cleveland, the death of Associate Justice Samuel Blatchford ignited a political fight between Cleveland and Senator David B. Hill of New York. Cleveland nominated in turn William B. Hornblower and Wheeler Hazard Peckham to fill the vacancy, only to have Hill block each nominee—both Hornblower and Peckham had previously opposed Hill's political machine in New York. In addition to the custom, the Senate afforded Hill great deference since the vacant bench seat had been held by appointees from New York since the Jefferson administration. Cleveland then leveraged a separate Senate custom—the custom of "all but automatic approval of senatorial colleagues"—to sidestep Hill's opposition by nominating Edward Douglass White, then an incumbent U.S. senator from Louisiana.

== See also ==
- Blue slip (U.S. Senate)
- Senate hold
- Senatorial courtesy (New Jersey) - as practiced in the New Jersey Senate
