= William Glascock =

American politician

11th Governor of Georgia
- In office January 7, 1779 – July 24, 1779
- Preceded by: John Houstoun
- Succeeded by: Seth J. Cuthbert

Speaker of the Georgia House of Representatives
- In office 1775

Justice Court of Richmond County
- In office 1776-1777

Commissioner of Indian Affairs for the State of Georgia
- In office 1783-

Personal details
- Born: May 28, 1730 Richmond County, Virginia, U.S.
- Died: c. December 23, 1793 (aged 63)

William Glascock (May 28, 1730 – c. December 23, 1793) served as Chairman of the Executive Council (governor) of Georgia during the American Revolution. He was from Augusta and was a veteran of the French and Indian War, Seminole Wars and the War of 1812. Glascock subsequently served in the Georgia General Assembly and the U.S. Congress. He was the father of Brigadier General Thomas Glascock Sr., and grandfather of Brigadier General Thomas Glascock Jr.

== Early life ==
Glascock was born on May 28, 1730, in North Farnham Parish, Richmond County, Virginia, to Gregory and Alice (Elder) Glascock. He became a lawyer and moved to Augusta, Georgia. William had two children, Thomas, who married Mary Bacon, and Blanche, who married Captain Robert Walton.

== Political life ==
In Augusta, he became involved in politics, serving as a representative in the Georgia House of Representatives. During the Revolutionary War, he was Speaker of the House. Glascock was labeled as a "Rebel Counselor" in the Disqualifying Act of 1780. This act was passed by Royal Governor James Wright and the King's Council who were angered by the continued patriot opposition to British rule in Georgia after the capture of Savannah in 1778. This act has become for Georgia an honor roll of its heroes of the Revolution.

In 1779, Glascock served as acting governor and helped establish the new state of Georgia government. In 1782, he was seated on the bench, having been appointed Justice for the Court of Richmond County. In 1783, he was appointed Commissioner of Indian Affairs for the State of Georgia.

On May 18, 1791, he hosted President George Washington at his home.

== Death and legacy ==
William Glascock died prior to December 23, 1793, the date on which his will was probated. He is buried in Magnolia Cemetery in Augusta, Georgia along with his second wife, Elizabeth, and a grandson. There is no known portrait of William Glascock.

== See also ==
- List of speakers of the Georgia House of Representatives

Political offices
Preceded by John Houstoun	President of the Georgia Executive Council; 1779	Succeeded by Seth John Cuthbert
