= List of lieutenant field marshals of the Holy Roman Empire =

The following is a list of the lieutenant field marshals in Habsburg Service during the French Revolutionary Wars and the Napoleonic Wars (1792–1815).

Feldmarschall-Leutnant (FML : Lieutenant field marshal) was the third highest rank in the Habsburg Army, behind Feldmarschall (FM : Field-marshal), and General of the branch (General of the cavalry, General of the infantry and Feldzeugmeister).

== A ==
- Franz, Baron Abele of Lilienberg • (1766–1861) • 58th Infantry Regiment (1830)
- Johann Baptist, Count Alcaini • (1748–1799) • died of wounds, siege of Tortona
- Karl, Baron Amadey • 1723–1795 • also Charles Baron d’Amadeï b. Brussels
- August Christian Friedrich, Duke of Anhalt-Köthen • 1769–1812, reigning prince, reigning duke • Quit Habsburg service in 1801.
- Nikolaus of Arberg and Valengin • 1736–1813
- Franz Count Arco • 1735–1795
- Stanislaus von Auer • 1758–1814, Inspector of Military Clothing. Bohemian
- Franz Xavier Johann von Auersperg • 1749–1808 • 36th Infantry Regiment
- Karl Joseph Franz von Auersperg • 1750–1822 • 24th Infantry Regiment, Cashiered in 1812
- Franz Xaver von Auffenberg • 1744–1815 • cashiered in 1807
- Karl Veith, Baron of Aufsess • 1734–1800
- Cornelius Hermann von Ayerenhoff • 1733–1819

== B ==
- Adam Bajalics von Bajahaza • (1723–1800) • Hungarian general
- Joseph Johann of Baader • 1733–1810
- Adam, Baron of Bajalics von Bajaháza • 1734 – 1800
- Emerich, Baron von Bakony • 1768–1845 • 33rd Infantry Regiment
- Ludwig Karl, Count of Barbiano-Belgiojoso • 1729–1801 • 41st Infantry Regiment 1777–1778
  44th Infantry Regiment 1778–1797 • quit in 1797.
- Karl von Batschek• 1715–1802• Academy of Engineers
- Joseph Heinrich, Count Beckers of Westerstetten• 1764–1840 • Raised to Count: 24 September 1790
- Friedrich Joseph Anton, Count von Bellegarde • 1752–1830 • 44th Infantry Regiment 1801 – 4 January 1830
- Joseph von Bencsur • 1759–1846 • 34th Infantry Regiment
- Joachim, Baron Bender • 1741–1818
- Johann Andreas Benjowsky von Benjow und Urbanow • 1740–1822 • 31st Infantry Regiment: 25 April 1794–25 July 1817 2nd Colonel-Proprietor of the Infantry Regiment N. 31: 25 July 1817–1 September 1822
- Friedrich Wilhelm of Bentheim-Steinfurth • 1782–1839 • 9th Infantry Regiment 1825 – 12 October 1839
- Karl Count von Bey • ? – 1819
- Frederick Bianchi, Duke of Casalanza • 1768–1855
- Ferdinand, Graf Bubna von Littitz • 1768–1825

== C ==
- Joseph Canto d'Irles • 1726–1797
- Michelangelo Alessandro Colli-Marchi • 1738–1808

== D ==
- Konstantin Ghilian Karl d'Aspré • 1754–1809, killed at the Battle of Wagram

== E ==
- Anton von Elsnitz • 1742–1825
- Karl Friedrich, Baron Am Ende • 1759–1810 • Autonomous Corp of Saxony, Netherlands

== F ==
- Franz Philipp Fenner von Fenneberg • 1759–1824
- Michael von Fröhlich • 1740–1814
- Karl Aloys zu Fürstenberg • 1760–1799

== G ==
- Friedrich Heinrich von Gottesheim • 1749–1808
- Albert Gyulay • 1766–1835

== H ==
- Karl Joseph Hadik von Futak • (1756–1800) • Battle of Marengo †
- Charles Emmanuel, Landgrave of Hesse-Rotenburg • (1746–1812)
- Friedrich Freiherr von Hotze • (1739–1799) • Second Battle of Zürich †

== J ==
- Franjo Jelačić • 1746–1810

== K ==
- Konrad Valentin von Kaim • 1737–1801
- Andreas Karaczay • 1744–1808
- Johann von Klenau • 5th Chevauxleger Regiment

== L ==
- Friedrich Karl Gustav, Baron von Langenau • 1782–1840
- Moritz von und zu Liechtenstein • 1775–1819
- Alois von und zu Liechtenstein • 1780–1833
- Anton Lipthay de Kisfalud • 1745–1800
- Johann Ludwig Alexius von Loudon • 1767–1822

== M ==
- Karl Mack von Leiberich • 1752–1828
- Karl Mercandin (–1799)
- Joseph, Baron von Mesko de Felsö-Kubiny • 1762–1815
- Anton Ferdinand Mittrowsky • 1745–1809
- Ferdinand Johann von Morzin • 1756–1805

== N ==
- Friedrich Joseph, Count of Nauendorf • 1749–1801 • 8th Hussar Regiment
- Adam Albert von Neipperg • 1775–1829
- Armand von Nordmann • 1759–1809
- Johann Nepomuk von Nostitz-Rieneck • 1768–1840

== O ==
- Peter Karl Ott von Bátorkéz • 1738–1809

== P ==
- Giuseppe Federico Palombini • 1774–1850
- Antun Pejačević • 1750–1802
- Giovanni Marchese di Provera • 1740–1804

== Q ==
- Karl von Quallenberg • 1766–1836
- Peter Vitus von Quosdanovich • 1738–1802

== R ==
- Charles Alain Gabriel de Rohan • 1764–1836
- Louis Victor Meriadec de Rohan • 1766–1846

== S ==
- Frederick, Duke of Saxe-Altenburg • 1763–1834
- Johann Heinrich von Schmitt • 1743–1805, killed at the Battle of Dürenstein
- Karl Wilhelm von Stutterheim • 1770–1811

== V ==
- Franjo Vlašić • 1766–1840, Ban of Croatia
- Josef Philipp Vukassovich • 1755–1809, killed at the Battle of Wagram

== W ==
- Franz von Werneck • 1748–1806
- Ferdinand von Wintzingerode • 1770–1818

== See also ==
- List of field marshals of the Holy Roman Empire
- List of generals of the cavalry of the Holy Roman Empire
- List of Feltzeugmeister of the Holy Roman Empire

== Source ==
- Biographical Dictionary of all Austrian Generals during the French Revolutionary Wars and the Napoleonic Wars (1792-1815), by Leopold Kudrna.
