= Sebastian Brodanovich =

Austrian general (1755–1822)

Sebastian Prodanovich Sebastian Brodanovich von Ussitzka-Caminiza
- Born: c. 1755; Mitrovic, Slavonian Military Frontier
- Died: 15 September 1822; Mitrovic, Slavonian Military Frontier
- Military career
- Allegiance: Habsburg Monarchy; Austrian Empire
- Branch: Army
- Rank: Feldmarschalleutnant
- Wars: Italian campaigns of the French Revolutionary Wars; Napoleonic Wars

Sebastian Brodanovich (or Prodanovich) von Ussitzka-Caminiza (c. 1755 – 15 September 1822) was an Austrian Lieutenant Field Marshal.

== Biography ==
Brodanovich was born into a military family in Mitrovic in Syrmia on the Habsburg Military Frontier. His father, Michael Brodanovich von Ussitzka-Caminiza, was promoted to Colonel in 1759. In the last stages of the Italian campaign, Prodanovich personally commanded the advance guard which consisted of the No. 1959 II Battalion Grenz Infantry Regiment of Banat (I Battalion 13th Grenz regiment) and No. 837 V Battalion Banater Grenz Regiment with Vukassovich's brigade against the forces of Napoleon that took Goito, Roverbella and Marmirolo in April 1799.

He died in Sremska Mitrovica on 15 September 1822.

== See also ==
- Paul Davidovich
- Martin von Dedovich
- Anton Csorich
