= Dedovich =

Dedovich is a surname. Notable people with the surname include:

- Ferry Dedovich (born 1947), Austrian figure skater
- Joseph von Dedovich (1752–1827), an Austrian lieutenant field marshal of Serbian origin
- Martin von Dedovich (1756–1822), Field Marshal in the Austrian Imperial-Royal Army

== See also ==
- Dedović
- Đedović
