= List of Feltzeugmeister of the Holy Roman Empire =

The following is a list of the Feldzeugmeister in Habsburg Service during the French Revolutionary Wars and the Napoleonic Wars (1792–1815).

Feldzeugmeister (FZM) was the second highest rank in the Habsburg Army, behind Feldmarschall (FM : Field-marshal), but before Feldmarschall-Leutnant (FML : Lieutenant field marshal). It was equivalent to the ranks of General of the cavalry and General of the infantry which was only introduced in 1908 for infantry officers. Prior to 1908, infantry Generals also used the rank of Feldzeugmeister.

== A ==
- Archduke Anton Victor of Austria (1779–1835)
- Archduke Rainer Joseph of Austria (1783–1853)
- Archduke Maximilian of Austria-Este (1782–1863)
- Archduke Louis of Austria (1784–1864)

== B ==
- Johann Wenzel von Bärnkopp (de) (1723–1794)
- Maximilian Anton Karl, Count Baillet de Latour (1737–1806)
- Theodor Franz, Count Baillet von Latour (1780–1848)
- Ludwig Anton, Count Baillet de Latour (1753–1836)
- Johann Peter Beaulieu (1725–1819)
- Antoine Marc Augustin Bertoletti (1775–1846)
- Thomas Freiherr von Brady of Longthee (1752–1827)
- Johann Georg von Browne (de) (1742–1794)

== C ==
- Johann Gabriel Chasteler de Courcelles (1763–1825)
- Hieronymus von Colloredo-Mansfeld (1775–1822)
- Marko Csollich (1766–1844)

== D ==
- Paul Davidovich (1737–1814)
- Thiery de Vaux (de) (1748–1820)
- Joseph Nikolaus de Vins (1732–1798)
- Peter Duka von Kadar (1756–1822)

== E ==
- Christoph Ludwig Freiherr von Eckhardt (de) (1761–1843)
- Karl Eugen zu Erbach-Schönberg (de) (1732–1816)
- Nikolaus II, Prince Esterházy (1765–1833)

== F ==
- Christian Wolfgang Freiherr Faber du Faur (1710–1793)
- Johann Philipp Faber von Ehrenbreitstein (1756–1844)
- Josef Freiherr von Froon-Kirchrath (1740–1821)

== G ==
- Sigmund von Gemmingen (de) (1724–1806)
- Johann Georg Freiherr von Geneyne (1723–1810)
- Menrad Freiherr von Geppert (1768–1855)
- Ignác Gyulay, Ban of Croatia (1763–1831)

== H ==
- Ferdinand Freiherr von Häring (1732–1822)
- Ferdinand Philipp von Harsch (de) (1704–1792)
- Johann von Hiller (1748–1819)
- Otto Philipp von Hohenfeld (de) (1733–1799)
- Louis Aloysius, Prince of Hohenlohe-Waldenburg-Bartenstein (1765–1829)
- Friedrich Wilhelm, Fürst zu Hohenlohe-Kirchberg (1732–1796)
- Karl Gustav Wilhelm zu Hohenlohe-Langenburg (de) (1777–1866)

== K ==
- Franz Wenzel, Graf von Kaunitz-Rietberg (1742–1825)
- Wilhelm Lothar Maria von Kerpen (1741–1823)
- Franz Joseph, Count Kinsky (1739–1805)
- Wilhelm von Klebeck (de) (1729–1811)
- Vincenz Maria von Kolowrat-Liebsteinsky (de) (1750–1824)
- Paul Kray (1735–1804)
- Hermann Peter von Künigl (de) (1765–1853)
- Johann Nepomuk Freiherr von Kutschera (1766–1832)

== L ==
- Franz von Lauer (1736–1803)
- Joseph von Lauer (de) (1769–1848)
- Alois von und zu Liechtenstein (1780–1833)
- Karl Friedrich von Lindenau (1746–1817)
- Franz Joseph, Marquis de Lusignan (1753–1832)

== M ==
- Andreas Mariássy (de) (1759–1846)
- Andreas Freiherr von Martonitz (1768–1855)
- Franz Ritter Marziani von Sacile (1763–1840)
- Johann Andreas Freiherr von Mathesen (1718–1793)
- Anton Mayer von Heldenfeld (de) (1764–1842)
- Alois von Mazzuchelli (1776–1868)
- Eugen Gillis Wilhelm Mercy d’Argenteau (1743–1819)
- Michael Freiherr von Mihalievits (1770–1845)
- Joseph Anton Franz von Mittrowsky [de] (1733–1808)
- Eugen Freiherr von Monfrault (17??–1808)
- Peter Prokop Graf von Morzin (1768–1855)
- Joseph Jacob Murray de Melgum (1718–1802)

== O ==
- Prince Frederick of Orange-Nassau (1774–1799)

== P ==
- Karl von Pausch Ritter von Werthland (17??–1845)
- Johann Franz Joseph Freiherr von Preiß (1704–1797)

== R ==
- Paul Freiherr von Radivojevich (1759–1829)
- Heinrich XIII, Prince Reuss of Greiz (1747–1817)
- Franz Xaver Richter von Binnenthal (1759–1840)
- Andreas Nikolaus Freiherr von Roos (1745–1814)
- Joseph Anton Freiherr Russo von Aspernbrand (1751–1840)

== S ==
- Franz Xaver Saint-Julien (1756–1836)
- Moritz Gerhard Freiherr Schlaun von Linden (1742–1825)
- Wilhelm Johann Freiherr Schröder von Lilienhof (1719–1800)
- Joseph Anton von Simbschen (1746–1820)
- Johann von Soro (de) (1730–1809)
- Joseph Staader von Adelsheim (de) (1738–1808)
- Karl Leopold von Stain (1729–1809)
- Gottfried Freiherr von Strauch (17??–1836)
- Anton Sztáray (1740–1808)

== T ==
- Ludwig, Baron of Terzi (1730–1800)
- Anton von Thurn-Valsassina (de) (1723–1806)
- Werner Freiherr von Trapp (1773–1842)

== U ==
- Leopold Freiherr von Unterberger (1734–1818)

== V ==
- Wenzel Vetter von Lilienberg (de) (1767–1840)
- Joseph Anton von Vogelhuber (17??–1822)
- Ludwig von Vogelsang (1748–1822)

== W ==
- Johann Peter Theodor Freiherr von Wacquant-Geozelles (1754–1844)
- Olivier Remigius von Wallis (1742–1799)
- Gottfried Christian Hugo Freiherr von Warnsdorf (1743–1831)
- Wilhelm von Wartensleben (1734–1798)

== Z ==
- Anton von Zach (1747–1826)

== See also ==
- List of field marshals of the Holy Roman Empire
- List of generals of the cavalry of the Holy Roman Empire
- List of lieutenant field marshals of the Holy Roman Empire

== Sources ==
- Rothenburg, Gustav Erich (1999), The Army of Francis Joseph, Purdue University Press, ISBN 1-557531-45-5
