= General of the cavalry (Austria) =

Military rank in Austria

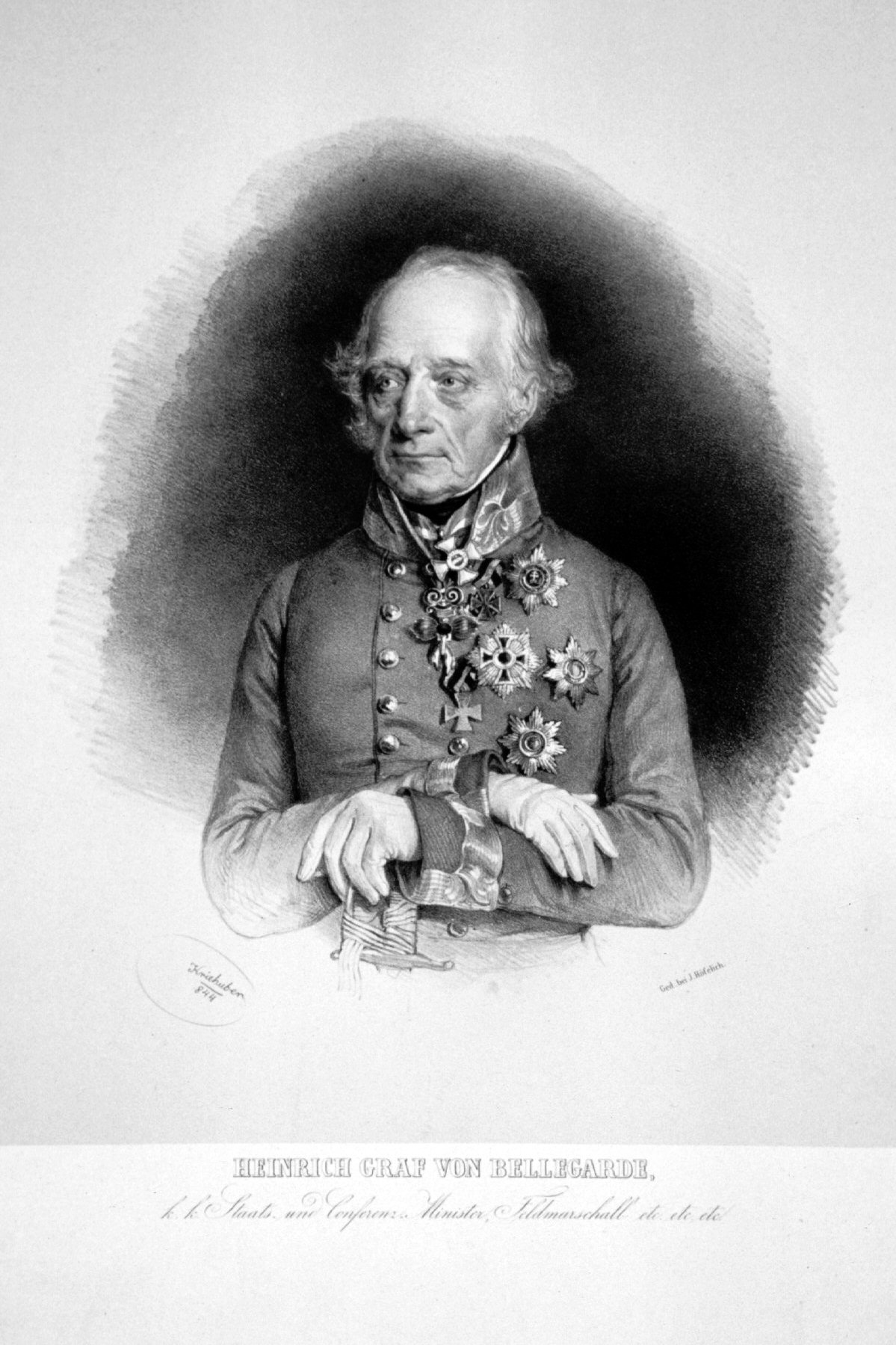
Count Heinrich von Bellegarde, appointed General of the Cavalry in 1800

General of the Cavalry (General der Kavallerie) was a rank in the Imperial Army of the Holy Roman Empire, Imperial Army of the Austrian Empire and the Army of Austria-Hungary.

In 1908, it was approximately equivalent to a United States Army lieutenant general, and usually commanded either a corps or an army. It was one rank below Feldmarschall until September 1915 when the rank of Generaloberst was introduced. It was equivalent to the ranks of General der Infanterie (introduced in 1908 for infantry officers), and Feldzeugmeister (for artillery and engineer officers). Prior to 1908, infantry officers also used the rank of Feldzeugmeister. The next lower rank was Feldmarschallleutnant (usually a divisional commander), which is often rendered as Feldmarschall-Leutnant.

== A ==
- Friedrich August of Anhalt-Zerbst (1734–1793)
- Johann Nepomuk Martin Freiherr von Appel (1826–1906)
- Heinrich Moritz von Attems-Heiligenkreuz (1852–1926)

== B ==
- Maximilian Anton Karl, Count Baillet de Latour (1737–1806)
- Count Heinrich von Bellegarde (1756–1845), 1799 (Holy Roman Empire and Austrian Empire), promoted to Field Marshal in 1809.

== C ==
- Eduard Clam-Gallas (Austria, 1805–1891)

== F ==
- Karl Ludwig von Ficquelmont (1777–1857)
- Louis Charles Folliot de Crenneville (1763–1840)
- Johann Maria Philipp Frimont (1759–1831)

== G ==
- Philipp Ferdinand von Grünne (1762–1854)

== H ==
- Ignaz Count Hardegg (1772-1848)
- Ferdinand, Landgrave of Hesse-Homburg (1783–1866)
- Frederick VI, Landgrave of Hesse-Homburg (1769–1829)
- Gustav, Landgrave of Hesse-Homburg (1781–1848)
- Konstantin of Hohenlohe-Schillingsfürst (1828–1896)
- Josef Friedrich Wilhelm of Hohenzollern-Hechingen (1717–1798)
- Karl Georg Huyn (Austria-Hungary, 1857–1938)

== K ==
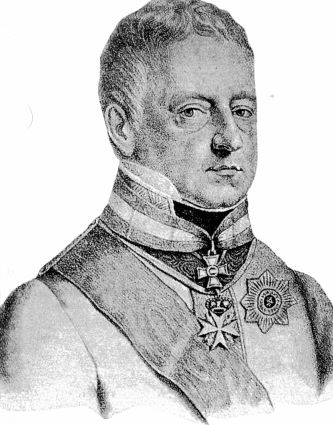
Michael von Kienmayer, appointed General of the Cavalry in 1809

- Ferenc Károlyi (Hungary, 1705–1758)
- Michael von Kienmayer (Austria, 1755–1828)
- Johann von Klenau (Austria, 1758–1819)
- Siegfried von Kospoth (1740–1809)

== L ==
- Charles Eugene, Prince of Lambesc (1751–1825)
- Joseph Louis, Prince of Lorraine-Vaudémont (1759–1812)

== M ==
- Michael von Melas (1729–1806)
- Maximilian, Count of Merveldt (Austria, 1764–1815)

== N ==
- Charles August, Prince of Nassau-Weilburg (1685–1753)
- Erwin von Neipperg (1813–1897)
- Friedrich Moritz von Nostitz-Rieneck (Austria, 1728–1796), promoted to Field Marshal in 1796.

== O ==
- Karl O'Donnell, Count of Tyrconnel (1715–1771)
- Andreas O'Reilly von Ballinlough (Austria, 1742–1832)
- Rudolf Ritter von Otto (1735–1811)

== R ==
- Johann Sigismund Riesch (Austria, 1750–1821)
- Prince Franz Seraph of Rosenberg-Orsini (Austria, 1761–1832)

== V ==
- Karl von Vincent (Austria, 1757–1834)

== W ==
- Christian August, Prince of Waldeck and Pyrmont (1744–1798)
- Ludwig Georg Thedel, Graf von Wallmoden (Austria, 1769–1862)
- Dagobert Sigmund von Wurmser (Holy Roman Empire, 1724–1797), promoted to Field Marshal in 1795.
- Duke Alexander of Württemberg (1771–1833)
- Henry Frederick of Württemberg-Winnental (1687–1734)

== See also ==
- List of field marshals of the Holy Roman Empire
- List of Feltzeugmeister of the Holy Roman Empire
- List of lieutenant field marshals of the Holy Roman Empire
