= Đedović =

Đedović is a rare surname found primarily in Southern Europe, concentrated in Bosnia and Herzegovina.

The following notable people share this surname:

- Dejan Đedović, Serbian futsal coach
- Dubravka Đedović, Serbian politician
- Milenko Đedović, Serbian footballer
- Nedim Đedović, Bosnian basketball player
- Nihad Đedović, Bosnian professional basketball player

== See also ==
- Nikola Dedović
- Dedovich
