= Martin von Dedovich =

- Born: 1756; Hrtkovci, Slavonian Military Frontier
- Died: 9 October 1822 (aged 65–66); Petrovaradin, Slavonian Military Frontier
- Military career
- Allegiance: Habsburg Monarchy; Austrian Empire
- Branch: Army
- Service years: 1776–1822
- Rank: Feldmarschalleutnant
- Wars: Austro-Turkish War; War of the First Coalition; Siege of Valenciennes; Siege of Le Quesnoy; Siege of Maubeuge; Battle of Tournay; Siege of Luxembourg; Siege of Kehl; War of the Fifth Coalition; Battle of Aspern–Essling; War of the Seventh Coalition; Siege of Huningue
- Awards: Military Order of Maria Theresa; Order of Leopold

Martin von Dedovich (1756 – 9 October 1822) was a Field Marshal in the Austrian Imperial-Royal Army who served in the Habsburg-Ottoman War, the French Revolutionary Wars, and the Napoleonic Wars.

== Biography ==
An officer's son born in Hrtkovci, Syrmia (then part of the Slavonian Military Frontier of the Habsburg monarchy, now Serbia), Martin Dedovich received his training in the Engineering Academy of the Austrian Imperial-Royal Army, which he entered as a cadet at the age of 20. In the Austro-Turkish War of 1788, which came in the wake of Koča's rebellion, Dedovich was promoted to the rank of first lieutenant and in the same year, during the siege of Bosanski Novi, he was put in charge of the opening of the 1st, 2nd, and 3rd parallel, the latter only 4 steps away from the covered road. As Field Marshal Loudon wanted to be completely convinced of the effectiveness of the breaching battery, Dedovich dared to walk 100 paces into the covered path and ditch in broad daylight and discovered that behind the palisades on the parapet, some distance from the Contreescarpe—the outer wall of the trench—there were two rows of large filled battery baskets whereupon Loudon immediately had 4 mine chambers built, which cleared these obstacles out of the way, whereby the breaching battery was able to work efficiently and successfully. It was there that he was promoted to the rank of captain. At the siege of Berbir in 1789 he was among the first to penetrate behind enemy lines. When the Turks left Berbir on 9 July 1789, Dedovich entered the fortress with the Reuss infantry from the trenches over the fortress. Dedovich received the Knight's Cross of the Military Order of Maria Theresa for his excellent performance at Novi and elsewhere. In the course of this campaign, he participated during the siege of Belgrade and Smederevo.

In the French Revolutionary Wars of 1793, he participated in the sieges of Valenciennes, Le Quesnoy and Maubeuge. Prince Coburg praised him for his excellent service. In the enemy cannonade on this side of the post at Pont-sur-Sambre (3 November), Dedovich distinguished himself again and was then drawn to the Battle of Tournay, the blockade of Luxembourg, and in 1796 received the recognition of genius in the defense of Frankfurt and as major in the campaign at the Main river in Germany and during the siege of Kehl.

In 1797 Dedovich was in charge of the buildings in Ulm and the defense of the fortress, and in 1798 he was used by the Imperial Contingent Army and promoted to lieutenant colonel. Dedovich gave telling evidence of skill and reliability in the construction business. In addition to the buildings in Ulm, there are also several other permanent places and entrenchments for which he worked the designs. In the Turkish war, he participated at Battle of Semlin, Battle of Schabacz, and the capture of Smederevo. As major general, Martin von Dedovich led the 4th column during the Battle of Aspern-Essling.

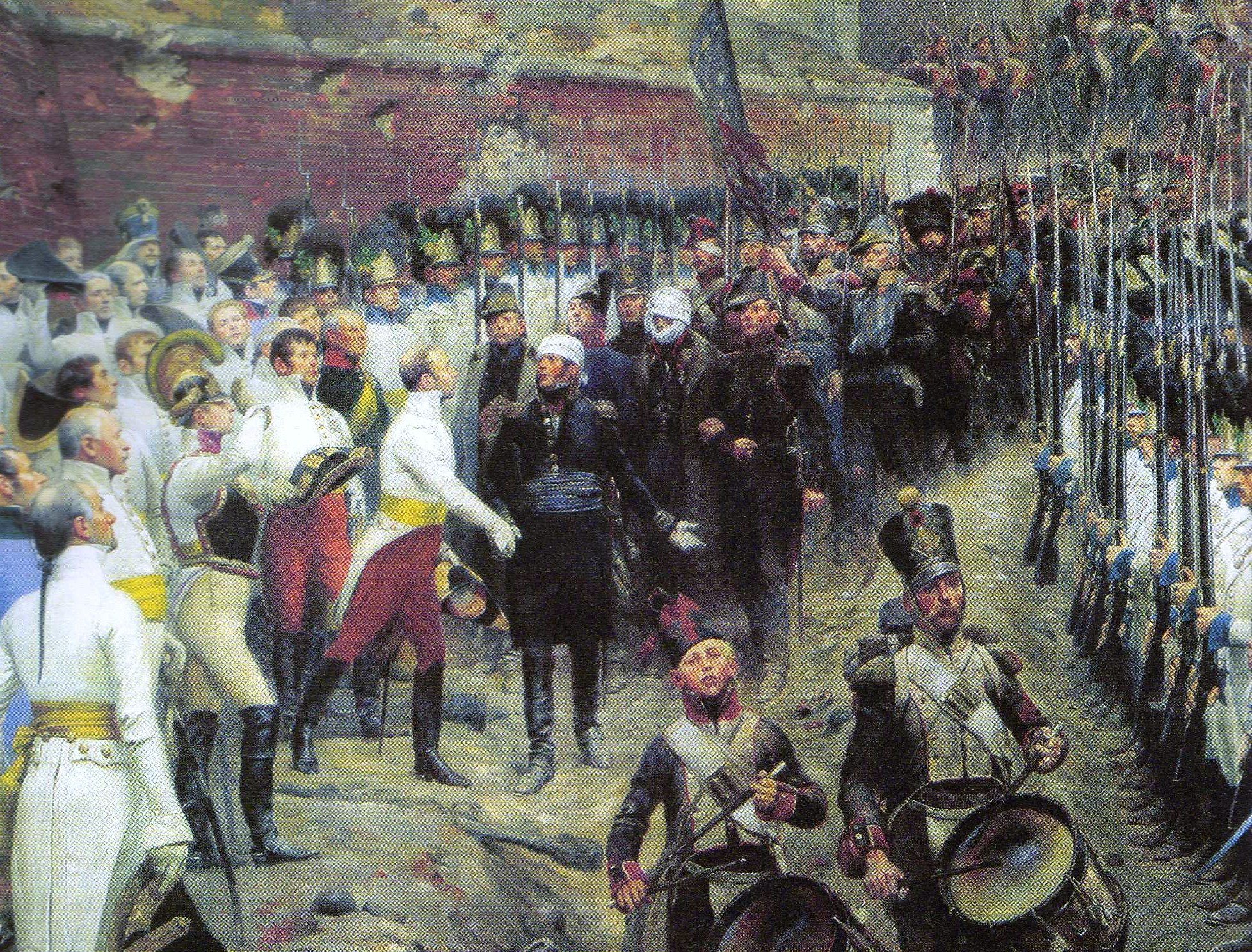
The French surrender at the Siege of Huningue in 1815, the final engagement of the Napoleonic Wars in which von Dedovich participated

He was in charge of the fortifications of Komáron in 1809, attended the siege of Huningue in 1814, and was awarded the Commander's Cross of the Order of Leopold. When the war was over, Dedovich was promoted to Field Marshal Lieutenant and died as Fortifications District Director in Petrovaradin at the age of 66.

== See also ==
- Joseph von Dedovich
- Sebastian Prodanovich
- Franjo Vlašić
- Andreas Karaczay
- Adam Bajalics von Bajahaza
- Anton Csorich
- Paul Davidovich

== Sources ==
- Hirtenfeld (J. Dr.), The Mar. Theresien-Orden and its members. According to authentic sources (Vienna 1857, Staatsdruckerei, Lex. 8 °.) II. Vol. P. 262. - Oestr. Military Conversation Lexicon. Edited by Hirtenfeld and Dr. Meynert (Vienna 1851) II. Vol. P. 24.
