= Andreas Karaczay =

Austrian military commander

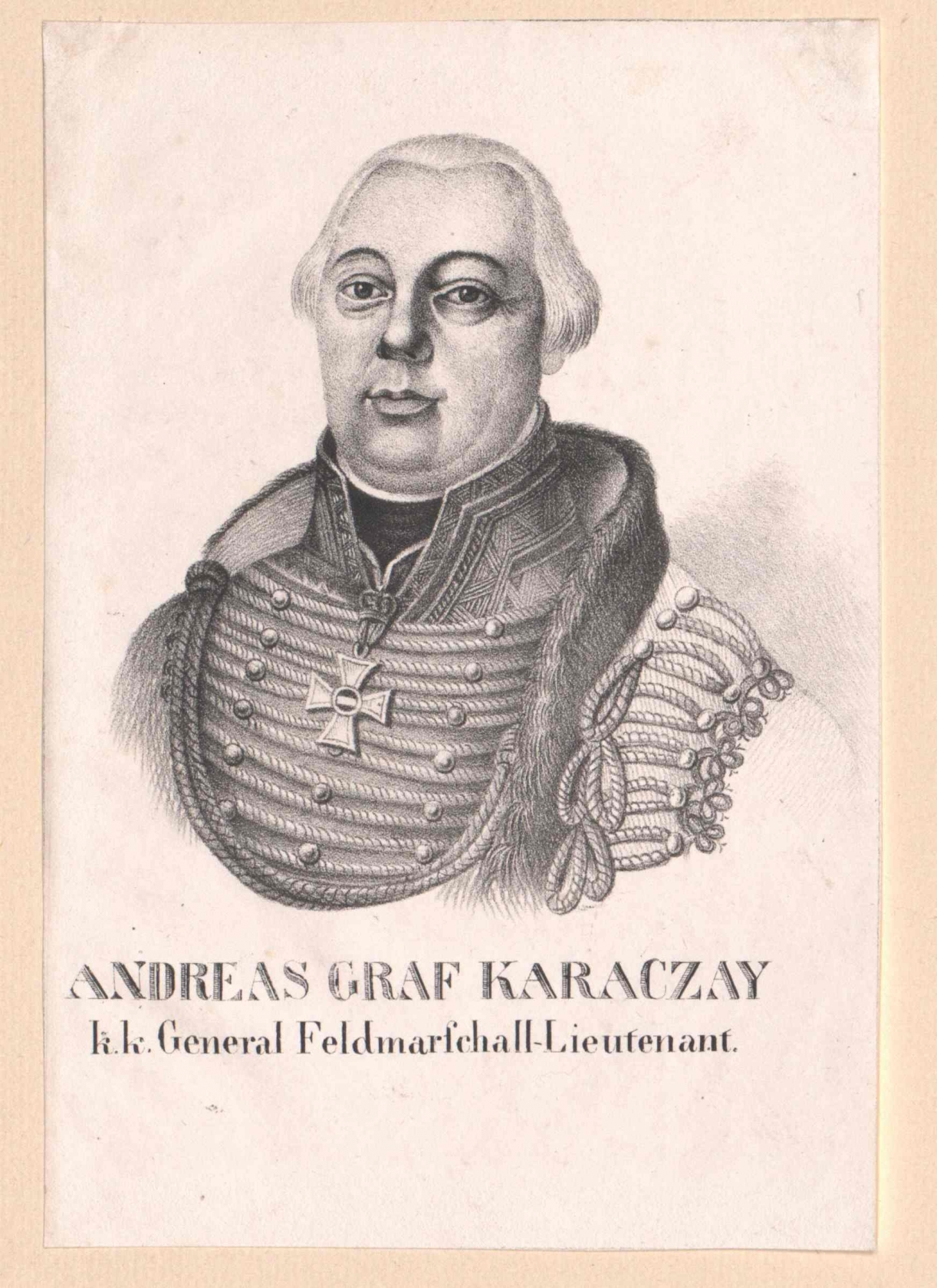
- Born: 30 November 1744; Hrvatska Kostajnica, Croatia
- Died: 22 March 1808 (aged 63) Wiener Neustadt, Austria
- Allegiance: (Habsburg monarchy) Habsburg Austria; Austrian Empire
- Branch: Cavalry
- Service years: 1758–1801
- Rank: Feldmarschall-Leutnant
- Conflicts: Seven Years' War; Austro-Turkish War (1788–1791); Siege of Khotin; Clash at Valea Seacă; Battle of Focșani; Battle of Rymnik; War of the First Coalition; Battle of Handschuhsheim; War of the Second Coalition; Battle of Trebbia; Siege of Alesssandria; Battle of Novi; Second Battle of Novi; Battle of Stockach
- Awards: Order of Maria Theresa, CC 1790; Order of Saint Anna, 1790

Andreas Karaczay de Vályeszáka or Andreas Karaiczay de Wallje Szaka or András Karacsaj de Válje-Szaka (Croatian: Andrija Karadžić; Serbian: Андрија Караџић; 30 November 1744 – 22 March 1808) served in the Austrian army beginning in the Seven Years' War. In 1788–90, he fought in the Austro-Turkish War at Khotyn, Valea Seacă, Focșani, and Rymnik. In 1789 he was promoted to general officer, appointed Proprietor (Inhaber) of an Austrian cavalry regiment, and became a friend to the famous Russian General Alexander Suvorov. He fought in the French Revolutionary Wars until 1795 when he retired because of "war fatigue". Suvorov recalled him to action in 1799 when he fought at the Trebbia, Alessandria, and Novi. He led the Austrians at Second Novi. After being badly wounded at Stockach in 1800, he retired from his military offices in 1801.

== Early career ==
Karaczay was born to a noble family on 30 November 1744 in Hrvatska Kostajnica in Croatia. In 1758 during the Seven Years' War, he joined the Banat Grenz infantry Regiment as a cadet at the age of 15. With his father Peter von Karaczay's help, he was assigned to a Freikorps in Hungary in 1775. At this time he became acquainted with Field Marshal Franz Moritz von Lacy. Through this connection, Nikolaus I, Prince Esterházy recommended him to join the Hungarian Noble Guard. During this period he met Empress Maria Theresa several times. After three years Karaczay was promoted to lieutenant in the Duke Albert Carabinier Regiment Nr. 5. Next, he was assigned as Rittmeister (captain) to the Darmstadt Dragoon Regiment Nr. 19 serving in Galicia. While inspecting the troops, Emperor Joseph II was so impressed that he promoted Karaczay to major. Karaczay married Rosalia Freiin von Wimmersberg auf Peterwitz.

== Ottoman War ==
Karaczay proved his mettle during the Austro-Turkish War, earning fame and distinction. He participated in the 1788 Siege of Khotyn. He was promoted to oberst (colonel) in 1788. On 19 April 1789, he led two squadrons each of the Kaiser Chevau-léger Nr. 1, Barco Hussar Nr. 35, and Levenehr Dragoon Nr. 19 Regiments, six companies of the Kaunitz Infantry Regiment Nr. 20, and four field pieces in action at Valea Seacă (Vályeszáka). That day, his troops defeated 5,000 Ottoman cavalry, capturing several flags and a number of enemy soldiers. He fought at the Battle of Focșani on 1 August 1789 and the Battle of Rymnik (Martinestje) on 22 September.

Suvorov found the Austrian commander Prince Josias of Saxe-Coburg-Saalfeld to be mild-mannered and slow, but saw a fellow enthusiast in Karaczay. Suvorov and Karaczay worked together to win at Focșani and the two men became such close friends that when Karaczay's third son was born on the same day as Focșani, he was named Alexander. On 13 August 1789, Karaczay was promoted General-major and appointed inhaber or proprietor of the Chevau-léger Regiment Nr. 18 (later named Dragoon Regiment Nr. 4). He received the Knight's Cross of the Order of Maria Theresa on 21 December 1789 for courage and intelligence on the battlefield. Empress Catherine the Great awarded Karaczay the Order of Saint Anna which he had to refuse because Austrians were not allowed to accept foreign medals at that time. However, the empress appointed his new-born son an honorary lieutenant colonel in the Fanagoria Grenadier Regiment. In December 1790 he received the Commander's Cross of the Order of Maria Theresa.

== French Revolutionary Wars ==
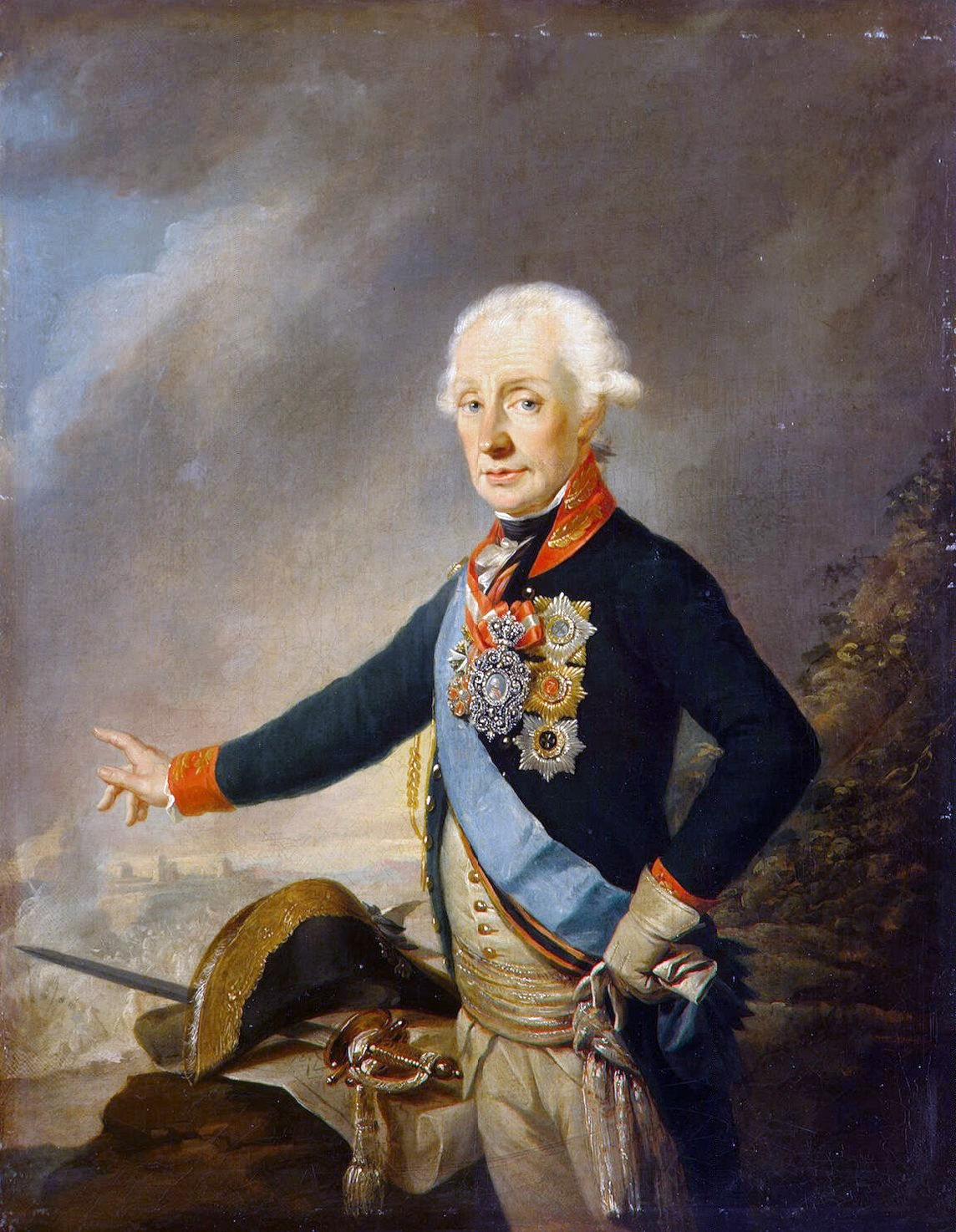
Alexander Suvorov was a friend of Karaczay.

After the Austro-Turkish War, Karaczay lived in Lviv (Lemberg). However, when the War of the First Coalition broke out, he transferred to the Army of the Rhine. He fought at Schwegenheim and later at Schifferstadt on 23 May 1794 alongside allied Prussian and Bavarian troops. He also led his soldiers in skirmishes at Weingarten (near Speyer) on 1 August, at Epstein on 29 August, and at Frankenthal on 3 October, and Ilochspier on 20 November 1794. He fought at Kaiserslautern, most likely in the Raid on Kaiserslautern on 17–20 September 1794 which was led by Wilhelm von Wartensleben and included the Vecsey Hussars Nr. 34, Waldeck Dragoons Nr. 6, Diedrich and Weidenfeld Grenadier Battalions, De Vins Infantry Regiment Nr. 37, Serbian Freikorps, and Gyulai Freikorps.

On 24 September 1795, Karaczay's brigade guarded Wiesloch under the orders of Peter Vitus von Quosdanovich during the Battle of Handschuhsheim. Karaczay fought at the Siege of Mannheim in October and November 1795. In some way Karaczay ran afoul of his commander Dagobert Sigmund von Wurmser, becoming the target of his "envy and resentment". He also suffered from frequent illness because of "war fatigue". Pleading sickness, he was released from service and went to live with his family at Lemberg and later Budapest. On 1 October 1798 Karaczay was ennobled as a Graf (count). His proprietary unit was renamed Dragoon Regiment Nr. 4 in 1798.

At the start of the War of the Second Coalition, Francis II, Holy Roman Emperor acquiesced with Suvorov's request to let his friend Karaczay take the field. Since Suvorov's Russian army had mounted Cossacks but no regular cavalry, Karaczay split up his own six squadron Karaczay Dragoon Regiment Nr. 4 among the Russian brigades. For example, during the Battle of Bassignana on 12 May, two squadrons were serving with Russian units. Karaczay led the 5,271-strong Austrian advance guard at the First Battle of Marengo on 16 May but only his outposts were engaged in the action. On that occasion his command included five battalions of Infantry Regiments Nr. 8 and Nr. 28. Karaczay fought at the Battle of Trebbia on 17–20 June 1799, the Siege of Alessandria, and the Battle of Novi on 15 August.

The Siege of Alessandria lasted from 22 June to 22 July 1799 and ended with the surrender of Gaspard Amédée Gardanne and the 2,700 survivors of the Franco-Italian garrison. Of Heinrich von Bellegarde's 21,000 men, the Austrians counted only 400 casualties. At Novi, Karaczay was positioned on the left flank of Peter Karl Ott von Bátorkéz's division with two and one-half squadrons of his own dragoons, three squadrons from the Hussars Nr. 5, and two field pieces. When the French began to retreat in the afternoon, Karaczay ordered his cavalrymen to pursue. Austrian horsemen were involved in the wounding and capture of French Generals Emmanuel Grouchy and Catherine-Dominique de Perignon. Karaczay was promoted Feldmarschall-Leutnant on 2 October 1799.

To the west near Cuneo, Michael von Melas and Jean Étienne Championnet were engaged in maneuvers that would result in the Austrian victory at the Battle of Genola on 4 November 1799. Johann von Klenau was ordered to drive on Genoa from the east. This effort came to grief at the Bracco Pass where the French captured 1,200 Austrians on 13 October. Karaczay was ordered to make a strong reconnaissance south, occupying Acqui and Cairo with one infantry regiment and some cavalry squadrons. Seeing Karaczay out of position, French right wing commander Laurent Gouvion Saint-Cyr brushed aside the Austrian outpost in Capriata d'Orba and pushed as far north as Tassarolo. Another French column drove 400 Grenz infantry from Pasturana into Novi Ligure. In response, Karaczay retreated with 4,000 soldiers to Asti on 6 October. The next day, Saint-Cyr seized Novi and, in response, Karaczay rushed his cavalry to Bosco Marengo, with his infantry coming up behind. By 9 October, Karaczay's division was assembled between Basaluzzo and Fresonara, facing east toward Novi. Saint-Cyr withdrew from Novi and took a position farther south.

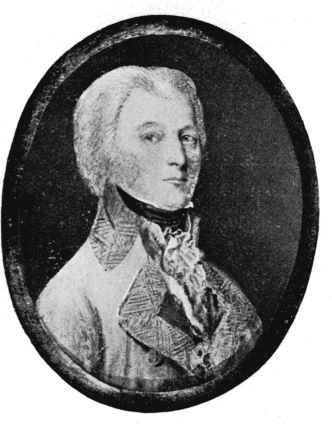
Paul Kray

Saint-Cyr commanded 16,675 soldiers in the divisions of François Watrin, Jan Henryk Dąbrowski, Pierre Garnier de Laboissière, and Sextius Alexandre François de Miollis. On 23 October he advanced with the divisions of Watrin, Dąbrowski, and Laboissière. The French reoccupied Novi and Karaczay fell back to his entrenched positions. The next day Saint-Cyr's troops attacked and pressed back the Austrians, who defended themselves stoutly. The fighting was particularly severe at Bosco where Karaczay had 12 artillery pieces backed by infantry and cavalry. Seeing that the French had only one howitzer and no cavalry, the Austrians counterattacked and drove back Laboissière's men. Austrian cavalry got among the Polish troops, capturing many. However, the Poles finally captured Bosco and the Austrian infantry began to flee toward Alessandria. The battle ended with Watrin in Rivalta Scrivia on the right flank, Laboissière in Bosco and Frugarolo on the left, and Dąbrowski in Quattro Cascine in the center.

In the Second Battle of Novi on 24 October 1799, the Austrians lost 300 killed and wounded plus 1,000 men and four guns captured, while the French sustained losses 400 killed and wounded and 800 captured out of 12,000, according to one source. A second source stated that the French captured 1,000 Austrians and five guns. Saint-Cyr believed the haul would have been greater except Laboissière was slow in bringing up his division. The Austrians admitted losing 64 dead, 205 wounded, 564 captured, and four guns. In the action Karaczay led 1,641 soldiers from the Frölich Infantry Regiment Nr. 28, 420 from the Kray Infantry Regiment Nr. 34, 523 Warasdiner Grenzers, 908 sabers from the 5th Hussars, 520 from the Bussy Mounted Jägers, and 12 artillery pieces.

The Austrian high command decided that Karaczay's performance was "inadequate" and sent Paul Kray to take command. Kray advanced against the French with 16 battalions, 2,800 cavalry, and 25 guns. Saint-Cyr's cavalry was weak and he had no horses to haul his four guns. Yet, Saint-Cyr led Kray into an ambush that sent the Austrian soldiers fleeing. In the Third Battle of Novi on 6 November 1799, Kray's 12,000 Austrians suffered losses of 1,000 men and five guns while the 11,000 French sustained 400 casualties. Karaczay was put in command of Cuneo fortress which was captured from the French in December. As part of his job, he stored enough food in the fortress to last three months for 4,000 soldiers.

== Later career ==
When Kray was appointed commander-in-chief in Germany in 1800, he asked that Karaczay be transferred to his new army. At the end of the Battle of Engen on 3 May 1800, Karaczay was hit in the abdomen by two musket balls. During the subsequent retreat, Karaczay was not able to get proper medical treatment for his wounds. He retired to his home in Wiener Neustadt where he suffered in pain from his injuries until he died on 22 March 1808. Karaczay was brave and had a quick eye for the battlefield. He was blunt and plainspoken in the criticism of his superiors, which earned him many enemies and blocked him from higher promotion. In 1801 Karaczay's regiment passed to the next inhaber, Prince Friedrich Franz Xaver of Hohenzollern-Hechingen.

== See also ==
- Martin von Dedovich
- Anton Csorich
- Adam Bajalics
- Franjo Vlašić
- Paul Davidovich

== Notes ==
Military offices
| Preceded by Christian Philipp von Löwenstein-Wertheim | Inhaber of Chevau-léger Regiment Nr. 18; 1789–1798 | Succeeded by renamed |
| Preceded by renamed | Inhaber of Dragoon Regiment Nr. 4; 1798–1801 | Succeeded by Prince Friedrich Franz Xaver of Hohenzollern-Hechingen |
