= Franz Xaver Saint-Julien =

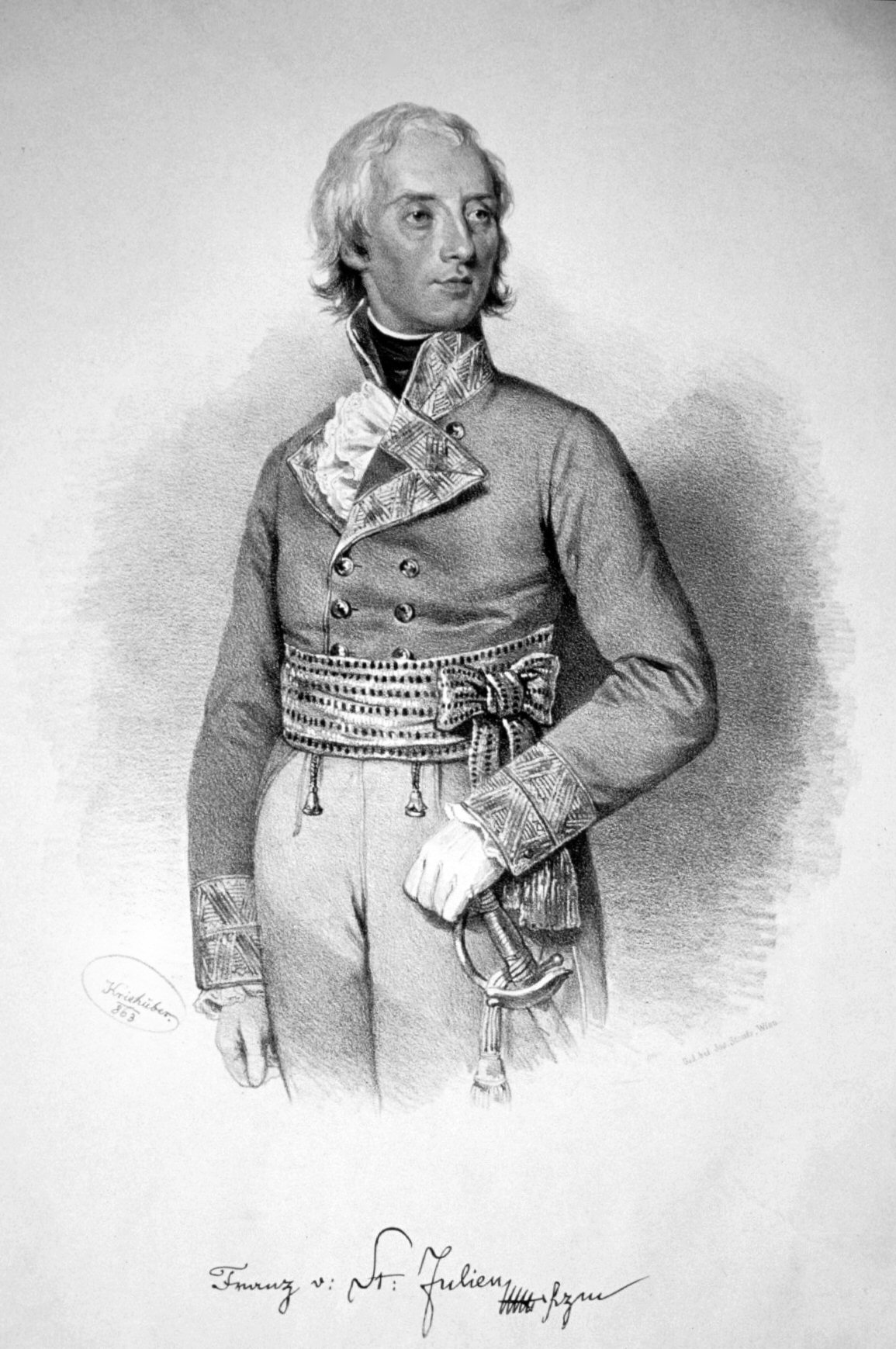
- Portrait by Josef Kriehuber
- Born: 12 October 1756
- Died: 16 January 1836 (aged 79); Skalička, Austrian Empire
- Relatives: Joseph Saint-Julien (brother)
- Military career
- Allegiance: Habsburg monarchy, Austrian Empire
- Branch: Infantry
- Service years: 1789-1812
- Rank: Feldzeugmeister
- Conflicts: French Revolutionary Wars; War of the Fifth Coalition
- Awards: Inhaber of the Infantry Regiment N°61; Imperial-Royal Chamberlain

Franz Xaver Johann Nepomuk Graf Saint-Julien und Walsee (French: François-Xavier de Guyard, comte de Saint-Julien) (baptised 12 October 1756; died 16 January 1836 in Skalička) was an Austrian infantry commander during the French Revolutionary Wars and the War of the Fifth Coalition.
