= Sava II Branković =

Saint St Sava II Branković

Confessor against the Calvinists
- Born: 1615
- Died: 24 April 1683
- Venerated in: Eastern Orthodox Church
- Canonized: 21 October 1955 by Romanian Orthodox Church

Sava II Branković, St. Sava II Branković or Sabbas Brancovici (Ineu, Principality of Transylvania, 1615 - Alba Iulia, Principality of Transylvania, 24 April 1683) was a hierarch of the Romanian Orthodox Church who was canonized for opposing the oppression of the Roman Catholic Church, the Calvinists, and the Ottoman Empire. His youngest brother was Đorđe Branković who spent three decades in jail without being charged for any crime. Today Sava II Branković is venerated as the Metropolitan of Transylvania, and Confessor of Romania, his feast day is on the 24th of April.

== Biography ==
Simeon Branković was born in 1615 in the town of Ineu (Serbian: Jenopolje) in Arad County, at the western border of the Principality of Transylvania, which was a vassal state of the Ottoman Empire. The Branković family was of notable Serbian origin and owned many large estates, and produced several notable soldiers and ecclesiastics since the end of the 16th century, becoming the most prominent among the Serb families of Arad County.

Young Simeon was tutored at home, then his studies took him to Orthodox monasteries in Hungary, Serbia and Bulgaria. After visiting his uncle, Metropolitan Longin Korenić Branković at the Comana Monastery, south of Bucharest, he decided to stay there to complete his education. Simeon had an opportunity to obtain an excellent education there. The Metropolitan tutored him in religious and secular subjects. Simeon read widely and avidly, primarily historical and biblical works, which he first discovered in the rich library of his uncle. After completing his studies, Simeon returned home and got married at the age of thirty. He was ordained to the holy priesthood, but his wife prematurely died soon after. At the same time, Simeon, the oldest of four brothers, lost his father Jovan and two of his brothers to the plague. His mother Mara then became a nun and retreated to a monastery, leaving her youngest son Đorđe who was ten years old. Simeon immediately took charge of his youngest brother. Father Simeon continued to serve in the Lord's vineyard for ten years, converting many Moslems, and reconverting Christians who had embraced Islam. His brother Đorđe received an enviable education, becoming a polyglot like his older brother who wrote in Slavonic-Serbian, Church Slavonic, Hungarian, Romanian, and Latin; he also knew Greek, Bulgarian, Turkish, Italian and German.

In 1656, a council of the clergy at Alba Iulia elected the widowed Father Simeon as the Metropolitan of Ardeal. He traveled to the Saint Nicholas-Geartoglu Church of Targovishte in Wallachia, and there he received monastic tonsure with the name Sava. On September 16, 1656, he was consecrated by metropolitan Stephen of Wallachia. Metropolitan Sava II moved to the capital of the principality, Gyulafehérvár (Alba Iulia) taking his brother Đorđe with him. Sava's episcopal service was plagued by the missionary activities of the Calvinists who tried to convert the Orthodox, and who were supported by the Prince of Transylvania (Prince Apafi). In addition, frequent wars threatened the stability of the area during his first years as a Metropolitan. Sava, however, proved to be equal to the task, being a faithful defender of the Church. He always showed little interest in yielding to the demands of the political authority to establish Calvinism among the ranks of the Orthodox, let alone unity with the Roman Catholics. He corresponded with metropolitan bishops Dosoftei and Varlaam Moțoc.

In the face of these difficulties, Sava set up a printing house in Alba Iulia where he published service books, manuals of instruction for clergy and laity, and catechism. He also preached sermons based on the writings of the Early Fathers and using the Lives of the Saints as models for his flock.

For more than two decades, Sava played a leading role in Erdelj's book printing. He was one of the first to print in the Romanian language. Sava and his followers at Alba Iulia made the first steps in formulating the fundamentals of the modern Romanian and Serbian languages. The proliferation of the Romanian language in print was part of a wider effort of what would eventually become Romania's struggle for sovereignty and cultural self-preservation a century and a half later. Sava wanted to preserve the Romanian identity that had been experiencing enormous pressure from the Hungarians, Austrians, and Turks. He initiated the publication of sermons for the laity in Romanian, Biblical texts in Church Slavonic, and scientific books in Slavonic-Serbian, Romanian, Greek, and Latin. Sava wrote several books which were distributed in Transylvania, Moldavia, and Wallachia, now extant. Sava was driven from his see between 1660 and 1662 because of his labors to strengthen his flock in Orthodoxy. Although he returned to his duties, more determined than ever, and served without interruption until 1680, Metropolitan Sava was often harassed because he refused to cooperate with the prince of the realm -- Michael I Apafi—and the Calvinists, who took root in Ardeal (Transylvania) a century earlier, the 1550s. Among the Hungarian speakers in Transylvania, the Calvinist branch was the dominant religion of the upper class, though Transylvania and Banat at the time had a large Romanian and Serbian population respectively.

Sava concocted the idea that the Brankovići of Arad County descended from the medieval Branković dynasty, which was not improbable, being the last ruling dynasty in Serbia before the Ottoman conquest. He passed this idea to Đorđe, with whom it would resonate all his life. The metropolitan planned a diplomatic and political career for his younger brother, who learned Turkish, Hungarian, Romanian, and Latin. In 1663, during the government of Prince Michael I Apafi, Đorđe was employed as dragoman for the kapı kâhyası (agent) representing the ruler of Transylvania at the Ottoman Porte. After the agent died in December 1663, Đorđe served as the acting kapı kâhyası until October 1664. He remained at the Porte until 1667, participating in several diplomatic missions.

In 1668, Metropolitan Sava II traveled to the Russian Empire accompanied by eleven men, Đorđe Branković among them. The journey was planned to seek help from the Emperor for the Orthodox population in Transylvania (Erdelj). The metropolitan had an audience with Tsar Alexis and informed him that the Orthodox Serbs, Bulgarians, and Wallachians were ready to liberate themselves from the Turks, with Russia's military help.

Shortly after their return from Russia, the journey made Sava problems with the authorities. This led to Sava's persecution by Prince Apafi and the Protestant leadership, who did not appreciate the metropolitan's fierce opposition to their attempts to convert the Orthodox faithful of Transylvania and they are constantly want to be free from the Turks. In February 1669, Apafi issued a decree imposing many duties and restrictions on Sava and consequently on the majority of the Orthodox flock. Because Sava had contacts with political opponents of Prince Apafi (the Russians), he also became the target of the Calvinist Superintendent Peter Kovásznai, the Reformed bishop of Transylvania, who saw Sava as an obstacle towards the intended conversion of the Orthodox into Calvinism. The latter denomination was a dominant political class in Transylvania at the time while the Romanian majority was subjected to the Calvinizing pressure from the authorities. Đorđe Branković was imprisoned for having the same contacts of which his brother was accused.

Still, Apafi made occasional concessions to Sava, on the other hand, he insisted on compliance with the so-called fifteen points of his predecessors and unconditional subordination of the Orthodox clergy to the Reformed superintendent Kovásznai. Despite Apafi's disagreements with Sava, Đorđe Branković was again in his service. Prince Apafi even entrusted Đorđe with diplomatic and intelligence assignments. Đorđe continued to serve as the Transylvanian kapı kâhyası at the Porte from 1675 to 1677. Sava apparently navigated shrewdly through these obstacles, since he remained the hierarch of Ardeal (Transylvania) until 1680, and despite repeated criticism from the leaders of the Reformed Church that, regarding the fifteen points, he "adhered to some of them, but not to others." In 1680, Metropolitan Sava II, however, was suddenly imprisoned. Among the possible reasons for the charges were the nomination of a new Calvinist superintendent in the person of Mihaly Tóföi and—much more seriously—the apparent participation of Đorđe and Sava Branković in a recently discovered plot to raise a revolt against the Turks, which would jeopardize Apafi position in Transylvania.

Sava was taken to Blaj castle as Apafi's prisoner, and Đorđe Branković lost no time to contact his friend, Șerban Cantacuzino, who acted on their behalf. He helped Metropolitan Sava to retain his metropolitan chair compelling the Habsburg to observe the old tradition in force from the time of Michael the Brave and Starina Novak, that the metropolitan of Alba Iulia be elected by the synod of Wallachia, which also consolidated the unity of the Romanians and other Orthodox co-religionists on both sides of the Carpathians.

After he was released, Sava died on April 24, 1683, the result of injuries he had sustained during the time in Apafi's castle in Blaj where he was seriously whipped. Much later, his brother would be incarcerated for almost three decades by Leopold I for allegedly attempting to unite the Serbs in the Balkans against the Ottoman Empire. Though kept in prison, he was never charged.

St. Sava was glorified by the Romanian Orthodox Church on 21 October 1955.

== See also ==
- List of Serbian saints
- Đorđe Branković
