= Đorđe Branković (count) =

Serb diplomat

Đorđe Branković Count of Podgorica
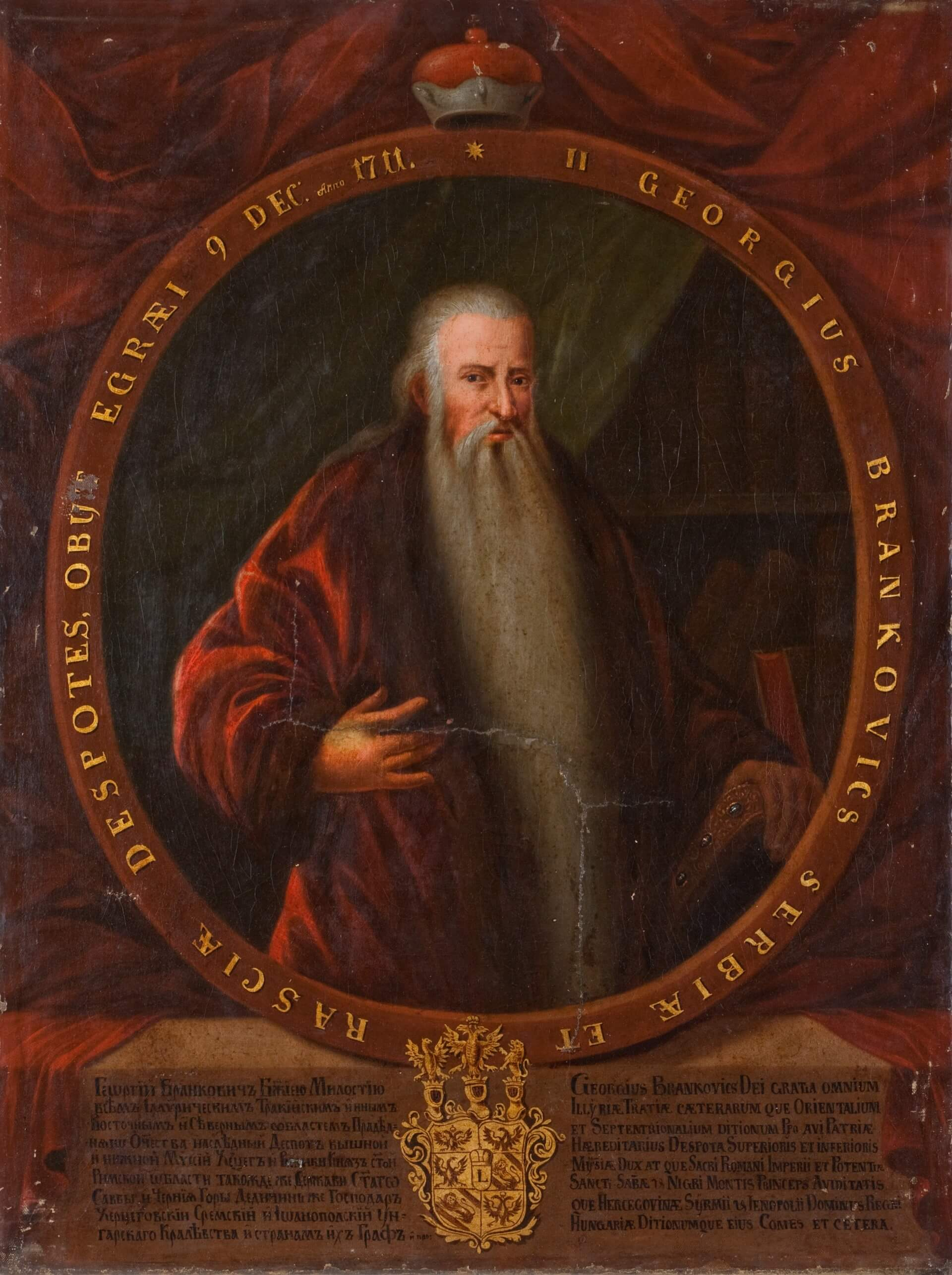
- Portrait of Đorđe Branković, made before 1730
- Born: 1645; Ineu, Arad County, Principality of Transylvania
- Died: 19 December 1711; Cheb, Bohemia, Habsburg Empire
- Resting place: Krušedol Monastery, Serbia; 45°07′10″N 19°56′43″E
- Occupations: Dragoman, diplomat, writer
- Years active: 1663–1711
- Known for: claim of descent from the Branković dynasty, attempt to restore the medieval Serbian state, influence on early modern Serbian historiography
- Notable work: Slavo-Serbian Chronicles

Signature
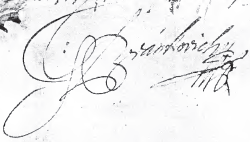

Đorđe Branković (Serbian Cyrillic: Ђорђе Бранковић, Latin: Georgius Brankovich, Romanian: Gheorghe Brancovici; 1645 – 19 December 1711) was a Transylvanian Serb diplomat, writer, and self-proclaimed descendant of the medieval Serbian Branković dynasty. He served as the agent representing the ruler of Transylvania at the Ottoman Porte. In 1680, he moved to Wallachia, whose ruler sent him as an emissary to the Habsburg Emperor Leopold I in 1688. That year, the emperor conferred the title of Imperial Count on Branković. After Habsburg troops captured parts of Serbia from the Ottoman Empire during the Great Turkish War, Branković attempted to restore the medieval Serbian state with him as its hereditary ruler. His venture failed in its inception, and Habsburg authorities arrested him in 1689. He lived on as a captive in Vienna and Cheb, though he was not held in a prison. He wrote the Slavo-Serbian Chronicles, which was influential in the development of early modern Serbian historiography.

== Life ==
=== Transylvanian phase ===
Đorđe Branković was born in 1645 in the town of Ineu (Serbian: Jenopolje) in Arad County, at the western border of the Principality of Transylvania, which was a vassal state of the Ottoman Empire. The Branković family owned large estates, and it had produced several notable soldiers and ecclesiastics since the end of the 16th century, becoming the most prominent among the Serb families of Arad County. Đorđe, who was the youngest of Jovan Branković's four sons, lost his father and two brothers to the plague when he was less than ten years old. His mother then became a nun and retreated into a monastery. Đorđe was taken to raise by his brother Simeon, who became the Orthodox protopope of Ineu. In December 1656, Simeon was consecrated Orthodox Metropolitan of Transylvania; he changed his name to Sava when he took his monastic vows. Metropolitan Sava II Branković moved to the capital of the principality, Gyulafehérvár, taking his brother Đorđe with him.

Sava developed the idea that the Brankovići of Arad County descended from the medieval Branković dynasty, the last ruling dynasty in Serbia before the Ottoman conquest. He passed this idea to Đorđe, with whom it would remain all his life. The metropolitan planned a diplomatic and political career for his younger brother, who learned Turkish, Hungarian, Romanian, and Latin. In 1663, during the government of Prince Michael I Apafi, Đorđe was employed as dragoman for the kapı kâhyası (agent) representing the ruler of Transylvania at the Ottoman Porte. After the agent died in December 1663, Đorđe served as the acting kapı kâhyası until October 1664. He remained at the Porte until 1667, participating in several diplomatic missions. In 1668, Metropolitan Sava II traveled to the Russian Empire accompanied by eleven men, Đorđe Branković among them. The metropolitan had an audience with Tsar Alexis, and informed him that the Orthodox Serbs, Bulgarians, and Wallachians were ready to liberate themselves from the Turks, with Russia's military help.

Shortly after he returned from Russia, Branković was again in the service of Prince Apafi, who entrusted him with diplomatic and intelligence assignments. He served as the Transylvanian kapı kâhyası at the Porte from 1675 to 1677. In 1680, Metropolitan Sava II was uncanonically deposed and imprisoned, because he had contacts with political opponents of Prince Apafi. Sava also had a fierce enemy in the Calvinist Superintendent of Transylvania, who saw him as an obstacle towards the intended conversion of the Orthodox into Calvinism. The latter denomination was dominant in Transylvania. Đorđe Branković was briefly imprisoned for having the same contacts of which his brother was accused.

=== Wallachian phase ===
After his release from prison, Branković left Transylvania and moved to Bucharest, the capital of Wallachia, another vassal state of the Ottoman Empire. He kept close relations with the lord of Wallachia, Șerban Cantacuzino, who persuaded Apafi to release Sava from prison. Sava died shortly afterwards, at the end of 1681.

The leader of Apafi's opponents in Transylvania, Count Ladislaus Csáky, kept contacts with Cantacuzino and Branković. In 1683, when the Great Turkish War was about to start, Cantacuzino sent him to the Habsburg Emperor Leopold I in Vienna. Csáky communicated to the Emperor that Cantacuzino and Branković were willing to become his allies. Csáky also gave to the emperor a letter in which Đorđe Branković presented himself as a descendant of the Branković dynasty, and requested the title of Hungarian Baron, which had been born by members of the dynasty. On 7 June 1683, Branković was given the requested title, and recognized as the hereditary lord of Herzegovina, Syrmia, and Ineu.

Wallachia was predominantly Orthodox, as was its ruler Cantacuzino. Letters from Cantacuzino and Serbian Patriarch Arsenije III Čarnojević were sent in 1688 from Bucharest to the Russian Tsar. He was called to intervene militarily in the Balkans, to liberate the Orthodox from the Turks, and to prevent the Habsburgs from forcibly converting the Orthodox into Catholicism if they succeeded in taking the Balkans from the Turks. The Serbian Patriarch wrote his letter after Branković informed him through an emissary about Cantacuzino's intention to contact the tsar. The emissary brought from Čarnojević an additional letter, specifically for Branković, in which the patriarch confirmed Branković's descent from the Serbian dynasty. The latter paper had most likely been written by Branković himself, and the patriarch only put his signature on it.

=== Becoming a count ===
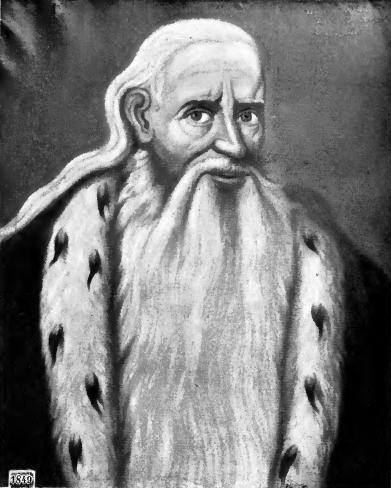
Portrait by Franz Schilhabel, c. 1849

At the end of May 1688, Cantacuzino sent Đorđe Branković and two more emissaries to Emperor Leopold, to relate his support for the Christian fight against the Turks. Preparing for this journey, Branković composed a memorial which he would present at the Habsburg court. The memorial stated that leaders of peoples of the "Illyrian Kingdom"—Bosnians, Serbians, Bulgarians, Rascians, Thracians, Albanians, and Macedonians—proclaimed Đorđe II Branković, a descendant of "Đorđe I Branković", as their hereditary ruler. The Illyrian Kingdom, which would be reestablished after the expulsion of the Turks from Europe, would include most of the Balkans and some lands belonging to the Kingdom of Hungary. Branković should be raised to the rank of Imperial Prince.

All in all, the text of the memorial was confused and unrealistic. However, the Habsburg Empire was at that time in a difficult position: it was about to wage a war with France, in addition to the Great Turkish War; and its finances were greatly diminished. Leopold's counsellors regarded that Branković could be used to motivate the Serbs south of the Danube and Sava Rivers to join the Imperial Army after its deeper advances into the Ottoman Empire. Any help was welcome, and the Banat Serbs had recently proved helpful. On 20 September 1688, two weeks after Belgrade was captured from the Turks, Branković was given the title of Imperial Count. He was referred to in Latin as Comes Georgius Brankovich de Podgoricza. His alleged ancestor, Vuk Branković, was thought to hail from the town of Podgorica in Montenegro.

=== Towards Serbia ===
Count Branković went to Wallachia and set about gathering men whom he would lead against the Turks. He proclaimed Captain Novak Petrović from Banat as the commander of his army. With his help, he gathered 800 armed men, with whom he went to the town of Orșova on the left bank of the Danube, across the area of Kladovo in eastern Serbia. Serb insurgents were already active in western and central Serbia anticipating an offensive of the Imperial Army. Branković intended to raise an insurgency in eastern Serbia. On 12 June 1689, Đorđe proclaimed his alleged subjects, the "peoples of eastern and northern Illyria, Thrace, Moesia, and other countries", calling them to rise against the Turks. He sent two monks across the Danube to spread his proclamation and call Serb elders to muster around him in Orșova. The monks were well received by the elders, but none of them appeared in Orșova; Branković was practically unknown among the Serbs outside Transylvania. After this failure, Branković went to a monastery in Wallachia.

In the meantime, counselors of Emperor Leopold learned of the correspondence between Cantacuzino, Čarnojević, and the Russian Tsar. The Habsburgs were apprehensive of Russian involvement in the Balkans, and the role which Branković played in that correspondence made them suspicious of him. They then checked historical records and concluded that his claim of descent was unfounded. Louis William, Margrave of Baden-Baden, who was in command of the Habsburg troops fighting in Serbia, gathered information on Branković's activities, and he concluded that they were against the interests of the Empire. In a letter dated 5 August 1689, Emperor Leopold instructed the Margrave to coax Branković into visiting him, and, if necessary, to arrest him. On 24 September, Louis William captured Niš with the help of Serb insurgents under Pavle Nestorović Deak, and then he returned toward the Danube.

=== Captivity ===
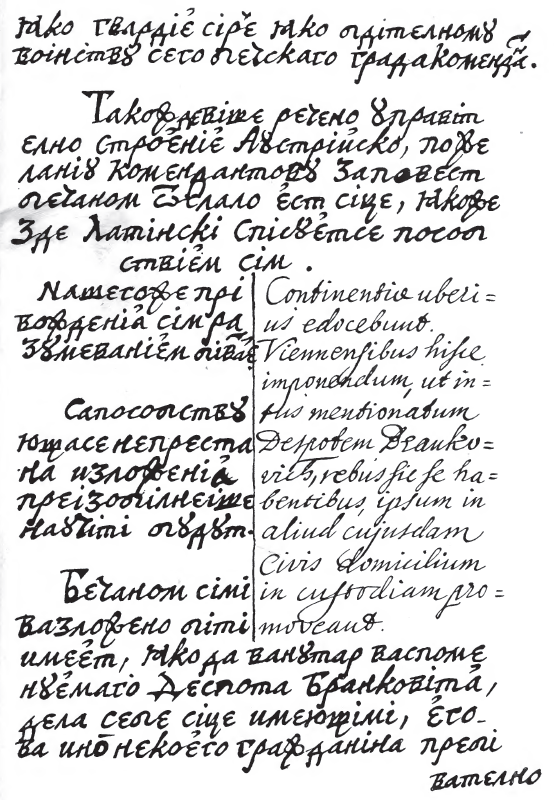
A page from the manuscript of the Slavo-Serbian Chronicles written by Branković during his captivity

Branković, who was still staying at the monastery, was invited in October to visit Louis William at his camp near Kladovo. As soon as he came there, Branković was arrested and after an interrogation sent to a prison in Sibiu, Transylvania. An independent state in the Balkans, as apparently Branković's ambition was to create, was not wanted by the Habsburgs. They intended to take Transylvania, Wallachia, Moldavia, Bosnia, Serbia, and Bulgaria from the Ottomans, and to annex these lands to the Kingdom of Hungary as part of their empire. In June 1690, Branković was transferred to Vienna, where he was placed under civilian supervision, and accommodated in a poorhouse.

By the end of 1690, the Ottomans recaptured Serbia, and many Serbs, including Patriarch Arsenije III, emigrated to the Habsburg-held southern Hungary. Branković became more widely known among the Serbs after a Serbian bishop met with him in Vienna in August 1690. In March 1691, Serb elders assembled in Buda to discuss formation of the Serbian Militia in Hungary. The elders elected Count Branković by acclamation as the Chief of the Serbs. As he was confined, Jovan Monasterlija was elected as his deputy, which was confirmed by Emperor Leopold on 11 April 1691.

In May 1692, Branković was moved from the poorhouse and accommodated at an inn named Zum goldenen Bären, where he remained until the end of 1703. From then on, he was kept at a house in the Bohemian town of Cheb. The Habsburg authorities refused all petitions for his release. He died on 19 December 1711. In 1743, his remains were transported from Cheb and buried at the Serbian Orthodox Monastery of Krušedol.

Đorđe Branković's title was passed on to his relative Jovan Branković, who was born in around 1675 in the town of Lipova, Arad County, Principality of Transylvania. He was Đorđe's personal attendant from at least 1700 until the count's death. Jovan Branković and his descendants, Counts of Podgorica, mostly served as officers in the Habsburg army in the Military Frontier. The last Count of Podgorica died in 1856, ending the male line of Jovan Branković.

== Works ==
While he resided in Bucharest, Branković wrote Istoriile domnilor Ţării Româneşti, a world history in the Romanian language with a special emphasis on Wallachia, Moldavia, and Hungary. During his captivity in Vienna and Cheb, Branković composed his main work—Slavo-Serbian Chronicles in five volumes—written in the Serbian recension of the Church Slavonic language (Serbo-Slavonic). It is a history of Southeast Europe, primarily focusing on the Serbs. Conceptually and methodologically, this work belongs to medieval historiography; in its intentions, however, it is a political text. It was influential in the development of early modern Serbian historiography, especially through its influence on 18th-century historian Jovan Rajić. It also influenced Serbian folk tradition: Branković claimed in the Chronicles that Prince Lazar Hrebeljanović was crowned tsar, and the prince is to this day known among the Serbs as Tsar Lazar. As a historical source, only the last volume of the Chronicles is of a certain value. In total, Branković wrote 5 volumes of 2681 pages of chronicles which are the first effort to distance history writing from medieval hagiography and similar styles in Serbian and other South Slavic historiography.

== See also ==
- Sava II Branković
- List of Habsburg Serbs
