= Joseph von Dedovich =

Military officer

- Born: 1752
- Died: 4 December 1827 (aged 74–75); Vienna, Austrian Empire
- Military career
- Allegiance: Habsburg Monarchy; Austrian Empire
- Branch: Army
- Rank: Feldmarschalleutnant
- Wars: Russo-Turkish War (1787–1792); Italian campaigns of the French Revolutionary Wars; War of the Third Coalition; War of the Fifth Coalition

Joseph von Dedovich (1752 – 4 December 1827) was an Austrian lieutenant field marshal. Joseph and Martin von Dedovich were brothers.

== Biography ==
Dedovich took part in the Siege of Bosanski Novi in 1788 before earning the command of a brigade in Vukassovich's division in northwestern Italy campaign in early 1800. Dedovich went on to command an infantry brigade in St. Julien's division in 1805 and then he commanded a division in Hiller's Tyrol Column at the Battle of Verona on 18 October 1805. After his promotion to Feldmarschalleutnant on 1 September 1807 he was put in command of a division, which function he held during the entire campaign of 1809. Dedovich commanded that infantry division at the victorious Battle of Caldiero. On 2 May 1809, he commanded an independent infantry division at Ebelsberg. During the Battle of Aspern-Essling on 21–22 May 1809, he commanded a division in IV Corps; then a division in Bellegarde's First Corps at Wagram (4–5 July 1809); and finally at Zaim where the armistice took place. Afterward, he held various posts and offices. In 1819 he was named vice-president of the Military Appellate Court.

He died on 4 December 1827 in Vienna.

Dedovich had a younger brother Martin von Dedovich (1756–1822), who followed in his footsteps.

== Promotions ==
- Major: October 1790
- Lieutenant colonel: 15 May 1791
- Colonel: May 1795
- Generalmajor: 2 October 1799 (w.r.f. 30 November 1799)
- Feldmarschalleutnant: 1 September 1807
- Posts and Offices (Army, Politics, Court)
- Vice-President of the Military Appellate Court: 1819

== Elevation of Social Status ==
- Freiherr is equivalent to "Baron" in social circumstances, although not the official title.: 17 October 1811
