= Second Battle of Novi (1799) =

Battle in Novi Ligure, present-day Italy

- Part of the War of the Second Coalition
Date	24 October 1799
Location	Novi Ligure, present-day Italy 44°45′42″N 8°47′26″E
Result	French victory

Belligerents
France: Polish Legions	(Holy Roman Empire) Habsburg monarchy

Commanders and leaders
(France) L. Gouvion Saint-Cyr; Jan Dąbrowski	(Holy Roman Empire) Andreas Karaczay

Strength
(France) 12,000	(Holy Roman Empire) 5,000

Casualties and losses
1,200	1,300, 4 guns

War of the Second Coalition:
Italy
current battle
Napoleon in command
Napoleon not in command

The Second Battle of Novi or Battle of Bosco (24 October 1799) saw a Republican French corps under General of Division Laurent Gouvion Saint-Cyr face a division of Habsburg Austrian soldiers led by Feldmarschall-Leutnant Andreas Karaczay. For several hours, the Austrians defended themselves valiantly, relying on their superior cavalry and artillery. By the end of the day, the French and allied Poles routed the Austrians from their positions in this War of the Second Coalition action. Novi Ligure is south of Alessandria, Italy.

A string of defeats, culminating with the Battle of Novi on 15 August 1799 left the French Army of Italy clinging to Genoa, Cuneo and the crests of the Ligurian Alps. An Austrian threat to Genoa was met with Saint-Cyr's strong thrust north through Novi against Karaczay's division at Bosco Marengo. Further west, Jean Étienne Championnet with the main body of the Army of Italy clashed with Michael von Melas's Austrians at Genola on 4 November.
