= Franjo Vlašić =

Croatian general and ban of Croatia

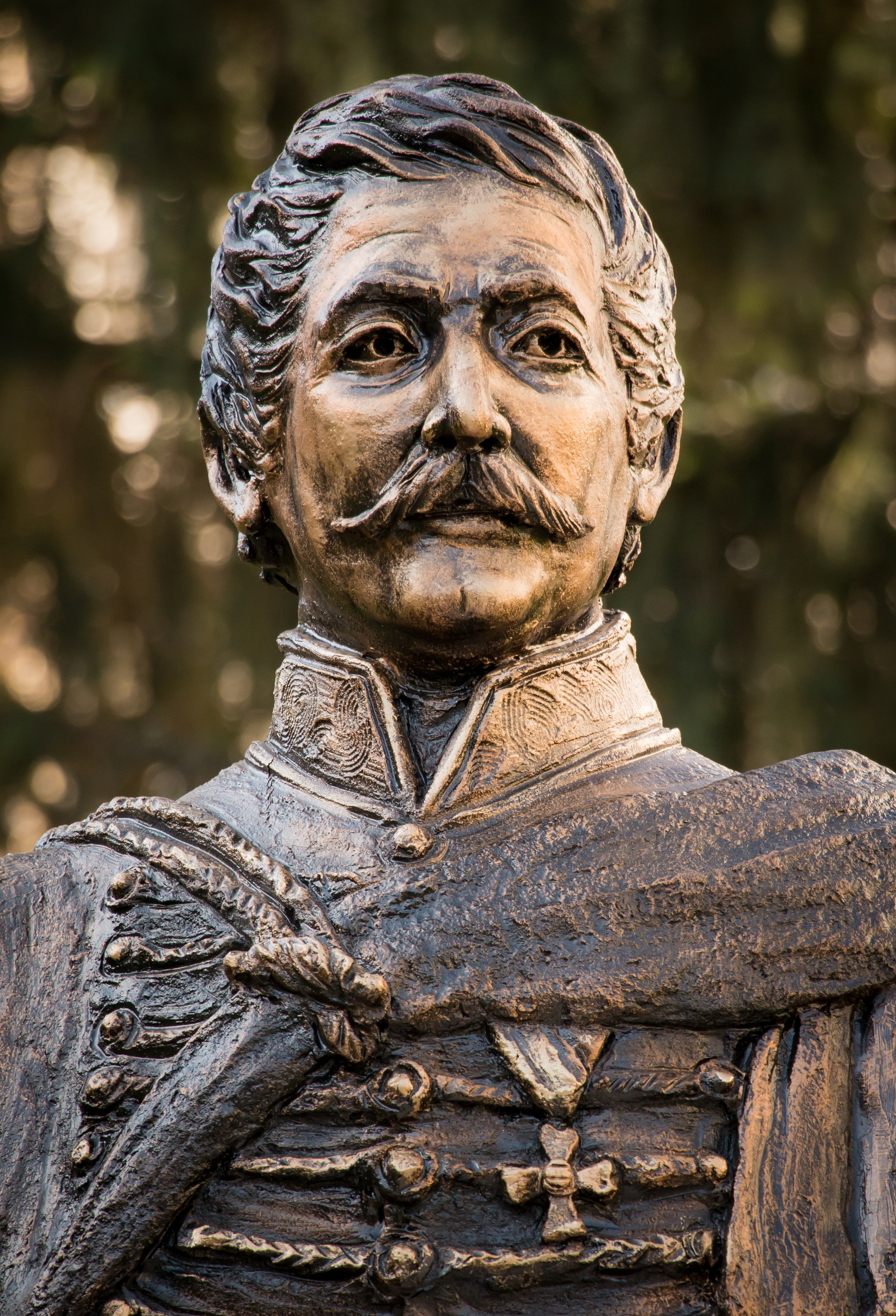
- Franjo Vlašić

Ban of Croatia
- In office 10 February 1832 – 16 May 1840
- Preceded by: Ignaz Gyulai
- Succeeded by: Juraj Haulik (acting Ban)

Personal details
- Born: 24 April 1766 Dombóvár, Kingdom of Hungary, Austrian Empire
- Died: 16 May 1840 (aged 74) Zagreb, Kingdom of Croatia, Austrian Empire

Franjo baron Vlašić (Austrian: Franz Vlassits; Hungarian: Vlassich Ferenc; 24 April 1766 – 16 May 1840) was a Croatian general and ban of Croatia between 1832 and 1840.

He began his military career in 1784. Vlašić obtained the rank of general in 1813. In 1831 he was appointed as military commander in Petrovaradin. Serbs in Petrovaradin considered General Vlašić one of their own.

He became a ban on 10 February 1832. He resisted the Magyarization of Croatia, especially the teaching of Hungarian in schools. During his rule the Croatian national revival began with the Illyrian Movement.

Following his death, he was succeeded by Juraj Haulik as acting ban.

== See also ==
- Martin von Dedovich
- Anton Csorich
- Adam Bajalics von Bajahaza
- Andreas Karaczay
- Paul Davidovich
