= Adam Bajalics von Bajahaza =

Adam Bajalics von Bajaháza, also Adam Bajalić von Bajaházy or Adam Bayalitsch, (1734 – 5 June 1800) entered Austrian military service and fought against Prussia, Ottoman Turkey, and France. During the Italian campaign of 1796–1797 against Napoleon Bonaparte, he commanded a brigade or a division in several actions.

== Military career ==
Born to a Dalmatin (Croats from Dalmatia, today known as Bunjevci) family in Szeged, Hungary in 1734, Bajalics enlisted in the Archduke Ferdinand Infantry Regiment # 2 from 1750 to 1754. He rejoined the Austrian army in 1758, this time in the Warasdiner Grenz Infantry Regiment. (The Grenz were light infantry recruited from the military border with Ottoman Turkey.) He fought in the Seven Years' War and earned promotion to lieutenant (Leutnant). During the War of the Bavarian Succession, he was a captain (Hauptmann) and was soon elevated to the rank of major. In 1783, he was appointed lieutenant colonel (Oberst-Leutnant) of the Szluiner Grenz Infantry Regiment. He served with distinction during the Austro-Turkish War (1788–91), becoming colonel (Oberst) on 28 February 1789.

The Seven Years' War (1756-1763), which essentially pits France and Austria against England allied with Prussia, offers Bajalics the opportunity to earn his stripes of lieutenant in 1760. Captain-Lieutenant in 1768 then captain in 1773, he was appointed major on the occasion of the conflict for the succession of Bavaria (1778-1779), between Austria, on the one hand, Prussia, Saxony and Bavaria on the other.

In 1782, on September 10, he received the title of Baron von Bajahaza.

== French Revolutionary Wars ==
On 1 January 1794, Bajalics became a major general (General-Major). During the French Revolutionary Wars he served as a brigade commander in Count Dagobert von Wurmser's army on the upper Rhine. He earned the Military Order of Maria Theresa for his exploits during the Battle of Handschuhsheim on 24 September 1795, in which a French division was cut to pieces.

After General Bonaparte's French army overran the Kingdom of Sardinia-Piedmont in the spring of 1796, Bajalics was posted to northern Italy. He commanded a brigade in Wurmser's first relief of the Siege of Mantua in early August. Wurmser assigned Bajalics to mask the fortress of Peschiera. After the Austrian defeat at the Battle of Castiglione, Bajalics sent four battalions of his troops to cover the main army's withdrawal.

During the fourth relief of Mantua in January 1797, Bajalics commanded a 6,200-man division that threatened French-held Verona. In this effort, in which Jozsef Alvinczi's main army advanced from the north and Giovanni di Provera's division moved against Legnago, the Austrian plan miscarried. On 12 January, Bajalics mounted an attack on Verona to draw attention from Alvinczi and Provera. After eight hours of combat with André Masséna's division, the Austrians fell back. On 14 January, Bonaparte crushed Jozsef Alvinczi's army at the Battle of Rivoli, then he hurried back to Mantua to wipe out Provera's column. Only Bajalics' troops escaped intact from the catastrophe. He was promoted to lieutenant general (Feldmarschal-Leutnant) on 1 March 1797.

When Bonaparte hustled the army of Archduke Charles out of Italy in the spring of 1797, Bajalics led part of the right wing in its retreat from Udine in present-day Italy toward Villach in modern Austria. In a confused series of actions from 21 to 23 March, the French succeeded in closing off the Austrian escape route at Tarvisio. On the latter day, hemmed in by the divisions of Masséna and Jean Sérurier, Bajalics surrendered with 3,500 men, 25 artillery pieces and 400 wagons. His forces also suffered 1,000 killed and wounded while inflicting 1,200 casualties on the French.

Bajalics retired from military service in 1797 and died in 1800 in Karlovac.

== See also ==
- Siege of Mantua (1796-1797)
- Paul Davidovich
- Franjo Vlašić
- Anton Csorich
- Martin von Dedovich
- Andreas Karaczay

== Sources ==
- Boycott-Brown, Martin (2001). The Road to Rivoli. London: Cassell & Co. ISBN 0-304-35305-1.
- Chandler, David (1979). Dictionary of the Napoleonic Wars. New York: Macmillan. ISBN 0-02-523670-9.
- Smith, Digby (1998). The Napoleonic Wars Data Book. London: Greenhill. ISBN 1-85367-276-9.
- Heka, Ladislav (November 2010). "Uloga Hrvata u povijesti slobodnog i kraljevskog grada Szegedina" [The Role of the Croats in the History of the Royal Borough of Szeged]. Annals of the Institute for Scientific and Art Research in Osijek (in Croatian) (26). Croatian Academy of Sciences and Arts: 57–73. ISSN 1848-7831.
- Brnardić, Vladimir (December 2007). "Adam Bajalić (1734.-1800.)". Hrvatski vojnik (166). Archived from the original on 2013-10-29.
