= Anton Csorich =

Austrian general

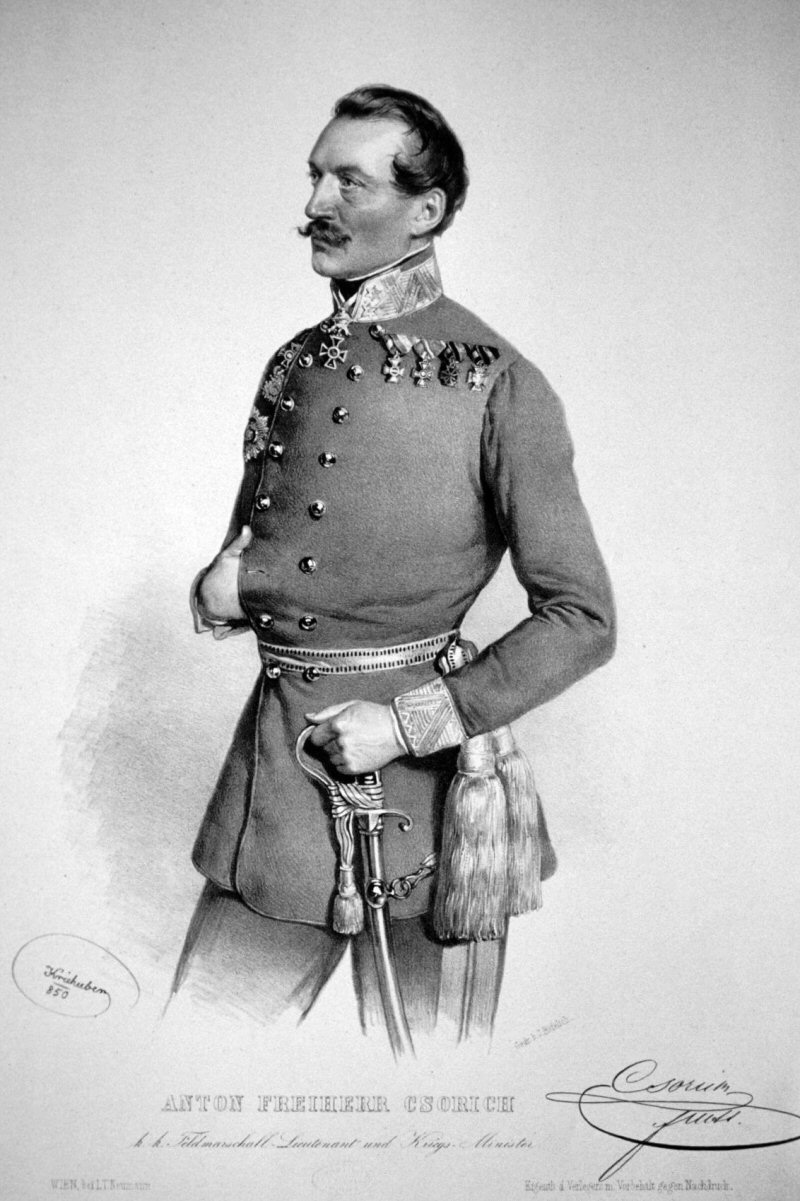
- Born: 1795; Mahično near Karlovac, Austrian Empire (today in Croatia)
- Died: 15 July 1864 (aged 68–69); Dornbach at Vienna, Austria
- Military career
- Allegiance: Austrian Empire
- Branch: Austrian Army (1815–1867)
- Rank: Lieutenant field marshal
- Commands: 15th Infantry Regiment
- Conflicts: 1848 Habsburg Revolutions, Hungarian Revolution of 1848

Anton Csorich (Croatian: Antun Čorić; 1795–1864) was a Croatian nobleman and general in the Habsburg monarchy imperial army service. He was titled baron of Monte Creto and promoted to the position of lieutenant field marshal when he became the second chief of the 15th Infantry Regiment. In that position he took part in the suppression of the October 1848 uprising in Vienna. He then went on to participate in the Austrian war against the Hungarian State in 1849.

He was also a holder of the Knight's Cross of the Military Order of Maria Theresa.

== See also ==
- List of Military Order of Maria Theresa recipients of Croatian descent
- Croatian nobility
- Adam Bajalics
- Franjo Vlašić
- Paul Davidovich
- Andreas Karaczay

== Sources ==
- "Csorich von Monte Creto Anton Frh." (PDF). Österreichisches Biographisches Lexikon 1815–1950 (in German). Vol. 1. 1957. p. 159.
