= Skalička (Přerov District) =

- Municipality
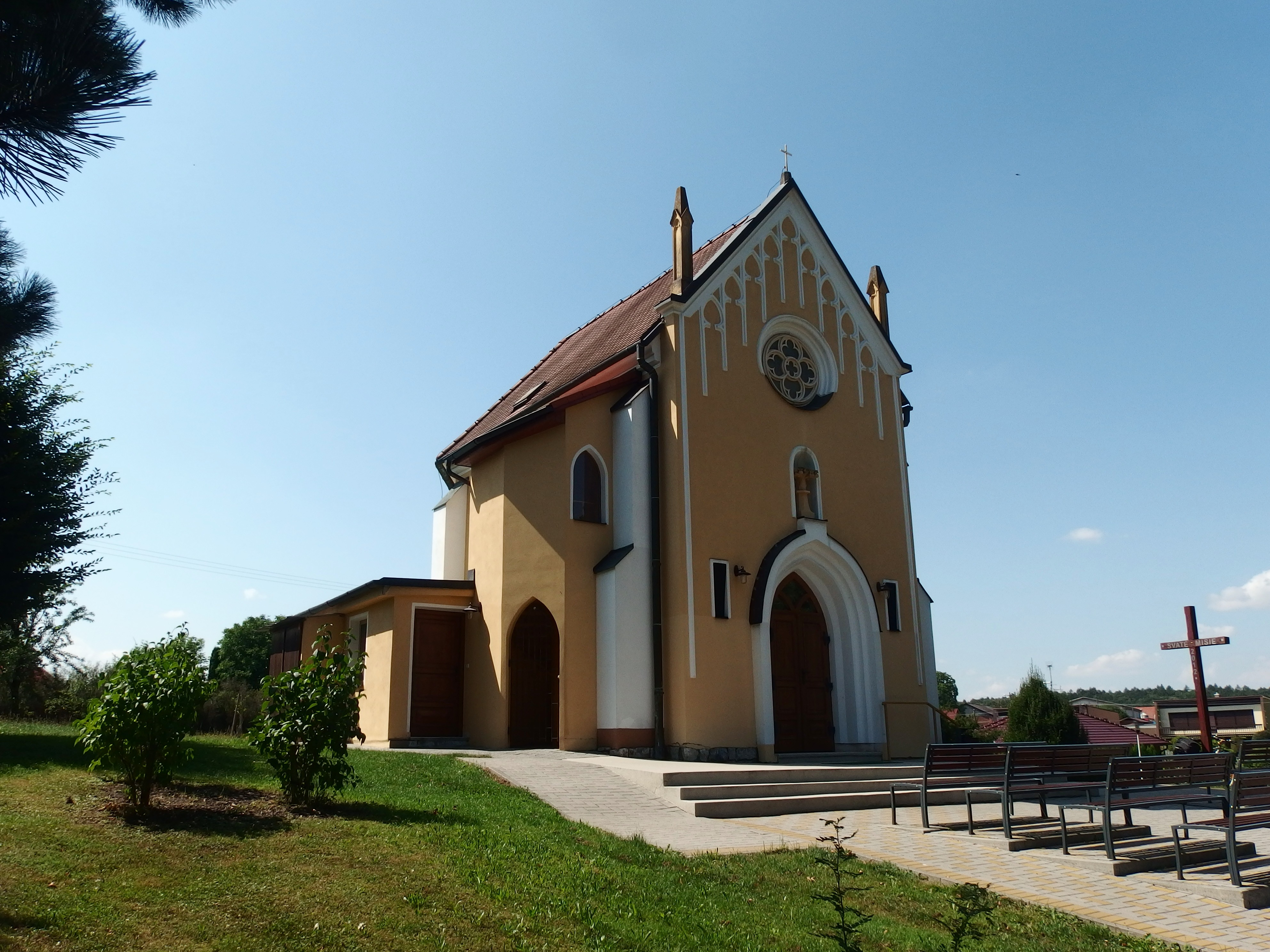
- Chapel of Saint Theodore

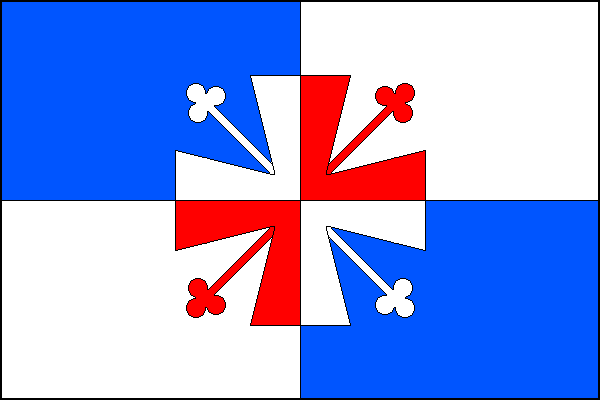
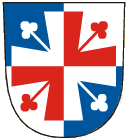
- Flag Coat of arms

- Location in the Czech Republic
- Coordinates: 49°30′55″N 17°47′45″E
- Country: Czech Republic
- Region: Olomouc
- District: Přerov
- First mentioned: 1328

Area
  - Total: 4.14 km^{2} (1.60 sq mi)
- Elevation: 268 m (879 ft)

Population (2026-01-01)
  - Total: 651
  - Density: 157/km^{2} (407/sq mi)
- Time zone: UTC+1 (CET)
  - Summer (DST): UTC+2 (CEST)
- Postal code: 753 52
- Website: www.obecskalicka.cz

Skalička is a municipality and village in Přerov District in the Olomouc Region of the Czech Republic. It has about 700 inhabitants.

Skalička lies approximately 27 kilometres (17 mi) east of Přerov, 41 km (25 mi) east of Olomouc, and 251 km (156 mi) east of Prague.

== History ==
The first written mention of Skalička is from 1328.

== Demographics ==
Historical population
Year	Pop.	±%
1869	401	—
1880	427	+6.5%
1890	468	+9.6%
1900	521	+11.3%
1910	565	+8.4%
1921	456	−19.3%
1930	526	+15.4%
1950	443	−15.8%
1961	495	+11.7%
1970	589	+19.0%
1980	619	+5.1%
1991	559	−9.7%
2001	535	−4.3%
2011	526	−1.7%
2021	634	+20.5%
Source: Censuses
