= Grenz infantry =

Type of light infantry, 18th century

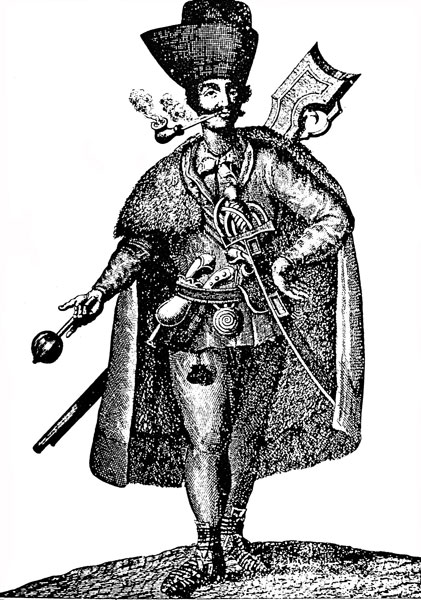
- Serbian Grenzer, 1742
- Country: Habsburg monarchy Austrian Empire; Austria-Hungary
- Type: Border guard
- Role: Artillery observer Border control Cavalry tactics Charge; Direct fire Infantry square Internal security Line warfare Raiding; Reconnaissance; Screening; Security checkpoint Skirmisher
- Nickname: Grenzers / Krajišnici
- Engagements: Ottoman–Habsburg wars and the Napoleonic Wars

Commanders
- Notable commanders: Branković family, Vuk Isaković, Jovan Tekelija, Paul Davidovich, Adam Bajalics von Bajahaza, Wilhelm von Wartensleben, Ignác Gyulay, Mathias Rukavina von Boynograd, Josef Philipp Vukassovich

Grenz infantry or Grenzers or Granichary (from German: Grenzer "border guard" or "frontiersman"; Serbo-Croatian: graničari, krajišnici, Hungarian: granicsár, Serbian Cyrillic: граничари, крајишници, Russian Cyrillic: граничары) were combined border guard troops (include light cavalry, light horse artillery, light infantry, and line infantry) who came from the Military Frontier in the Habsburg monarchy (later the Austrian Empire and Austria-Hungary). This borderland formed a buffer zone between Christian Europe and the Ottoman Empire, and the troops were originally raised to defend their homelands against the Ottoman Turks. When there was no danger of war against the Ottomans, the Grenzer regiments were employed by the Habsburgs in other theatres of war, although one battalion of each regiment would always remain guarding the border.

As Granichary, members of this Grenz infantry were invited to the Russian Empire where on territory of modern Ukraine they formed historic frontier region of New Serbia.

== Origin ==
Grenzers were the successors to the irregular troops of Pandurs, which were also raised as a militia by the Habsburgs in the 18th century to defend the border with the Ottomans and also used as skirmishers in the Seven Years' War. However, by the time of the Napoleonic Wars, troops from the Frontier were now formed into more regular line infantry regiments, but were considered by the Austrian generals as something between light infantry and line infantry. They were given training in artillery observer, basics of linear tactics, marksmanship, reconnaissance, screening, and skirmishing. At the start of the war, the 18 Grenz infantry regiments formed about a quarter of the Habsburg army.

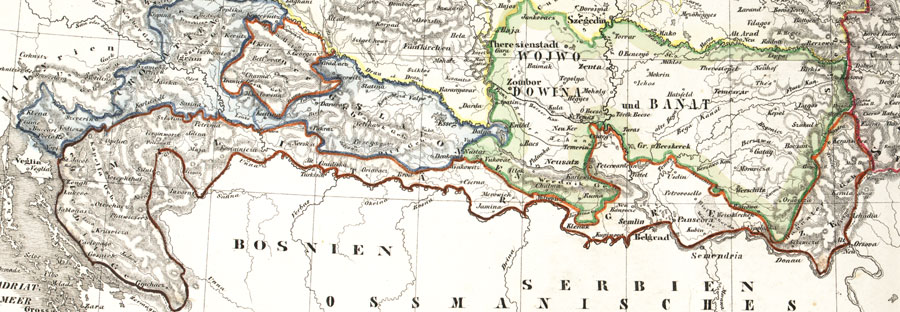
Map of the Militärgrenze or Military Frontier (marked with a red outline)

However, the Grenzers were first and foremost skirmishing troops and were thought not to perform as well in the role of line infantry as the regular regiments. As such, many in the Austrian military command did not hold them in much esteem. Following a mutiny in 1800, their numbers were reduced from 57,000 to only 13,000. Despite this, the Grenz infantry performed consistently well in battle, especially at Marengo and Austerlitz, earning them respect from the French. Napoleon held them in high opinion and considered them as the most warlike troops in the entire Austrian army. He had no hesitation in using the Grenz infantry after Austria's defeat in the War of the Fifth Coalition in 1809. The Treaty of Schönbrunn compelled Austria to cede territory in the Military Frontier and the 1st, 2nd, 3rd, 4th, 10th and 11th Grenz Infantry Regiments went into French service. They fought for Napoleon until his defeat and abdication in 1814.

During the 19th century, the threat from the Ottoman Turks diminished and there was less need for troops to defend the frontier. Also, with rise of South Slav nationalism and self-determination, the Austrian high command grew suspicious of the Grenz infantry and a possible uprising. With these factors, the number of Grenz infantry were steadily reduced, although they remained in service in the Austrian and later Austro-Hungarian army until the First World War.

== History ==
Grenzers defended state border from the Ottomans in Croatia and Slavonia and in Hungary, including Transylvania. In the territory of Croatia and Slavonia mercenaries Grenzers were Croats and Serbs while in Hungary there were Croats, Serbs who worked as Hajduks, Martolos and Vlachs. The Vlachs in Croatia and the Hajduks in Hungary had not only personal but also territorial privileges. The Vlachs that emigrated from the Balkans brought along their customary law, cooperative as an old Slavic socio-economic community, while the name Hajduk in Hungary also denoted a special social layer.

== Regiments ==
=== 1764 ===
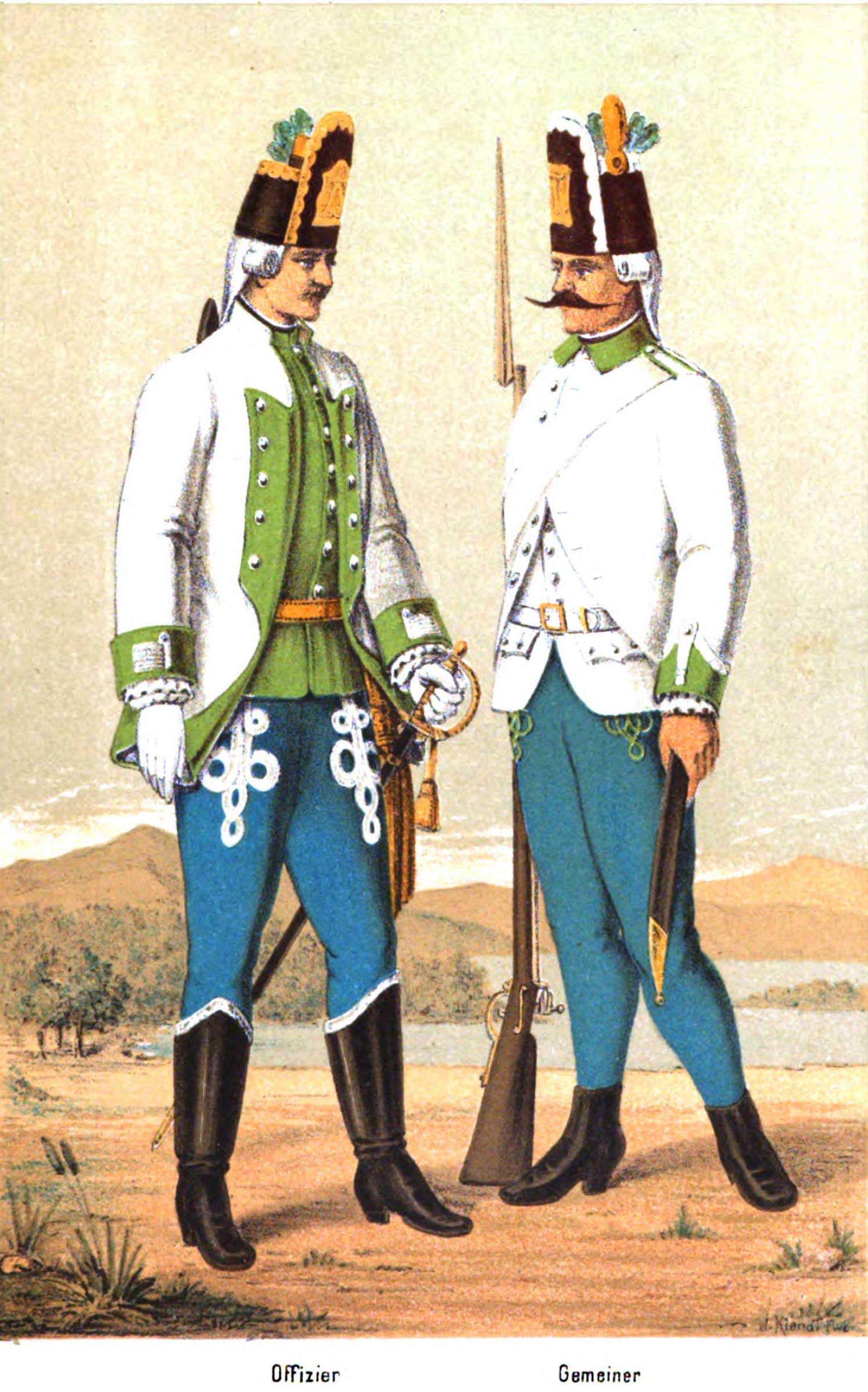
Officer and Gemeiner of the 2nd Wallachian Grenz Regiment in 1770

1. Liccaner / Gospić
2. Otocaner / Otočac
3. Oguliner / Ogulin
4. Szluiner / Karlovac
5. Warasdiner-Kreuzer / Bjelovar
6. Warasdiner-St. Georger / Bjelovar
7. Brooder / Vinkovci
8. Gradiscaner / Nova Gradiška
9. Peterwardiner / Mitrovitz
10. 1st Banal / Glina
11. 2nd Banal / Petrinja
12. Deutschbanater / Pancsova
13. Wallachian-Illyrian / Karánsebes
14. 1st Szekler / Csík-Szereda
15. 2nd Szekler / Kézdi-Vásárhely
16. 1st Wallachian / Orlát
17. 2nd Wallachian / Naszód

== See also ==
- Hussar
- Pandurs
- Oltramarini
- Cappelletti
- Skirmisher
- Šajkaši
- Military Frontier
- Serbian revolution
