= Milenko Đedović =

Serbian footballer

Personal information
- Full name: Milenko Đedović
- Date of birth: 28 February 1972 (age 54)
- Place of birth: SFR Yugoslavia
- Height: 1.86 m (6 ft 1 in)
- Position: Midfielder

Senior career*
Years	Team	Apps	(Gls)
1990–1993	Vrbas	39	(1)
1993–1995	Hajduk Kula	63	(12)
1995	Partizan	1	(0)
1996–1999	Hajduk Kula	83	(12)
1999	VfB Leipzig	4	(0)
2000	Borac Čačak		(1)
2000–2001	Zemun	28	(4)
2002–2003	Olympiakos Nicosia	36	(1)
2004–2005	Zemun	30	(3)
2005–2006	ČSK Čelarevo		
2008–2009	Vrbas	20	(7)
Total		270	(39)
- * Club domestic league appearances and goals

Milenko Đedović (Serbian Cyrillic: Миленко Ђедовић; born 28 February 1972) is a Serbian retired footballer who played as a midfielder.

== Career ==
After starting out at Vrbas, Đedović moved to Hajduk Kula in 1993. He spent two seasons with the club, playing in the First League of FR Yugoslavia, before transferring to Partizan in 1995. Six months later, Đedović returned to Hajduk Kula.

In 1999, Đedović had a brief spell at VfB Leipzig in Germany's Regionalliga. He later played for Borac Čačak and Zemun, before moving abroad for the second time in 2001. During the 2004 winter transfer window, Đedović moved back to his homeland and rejoined Zemun. He retired from the game in 2009.

== Career statistics ==
Club	Season	League	
Club	Season	Apps	Goals
Hajduk Kula	1993–94	29	5
Hajduk Kula	1994–95	34	7
Hajduk Kula	1995–96	7	1
Hajduk Kula	1996–97	25	2
Hajduk Kula	1997–98	30	8
Hajduk Kula	1998–99	21	1
Total		146	24
