= Branković family (Military Frontier) =

Serb noble family

Branković family of the Military Frontier
- Country: Habsburg monarchy
- Founded: 1688
- Founder: Đorđe Branković (supposed noble family)
- Final ruler: Pavle Branković
- Titles: Count of Podgorica
- Estates: Krušedol monastery Grgeteg Monastery; Novo Hopovo monastery Jazak Monastery
- Dissolution: 1856

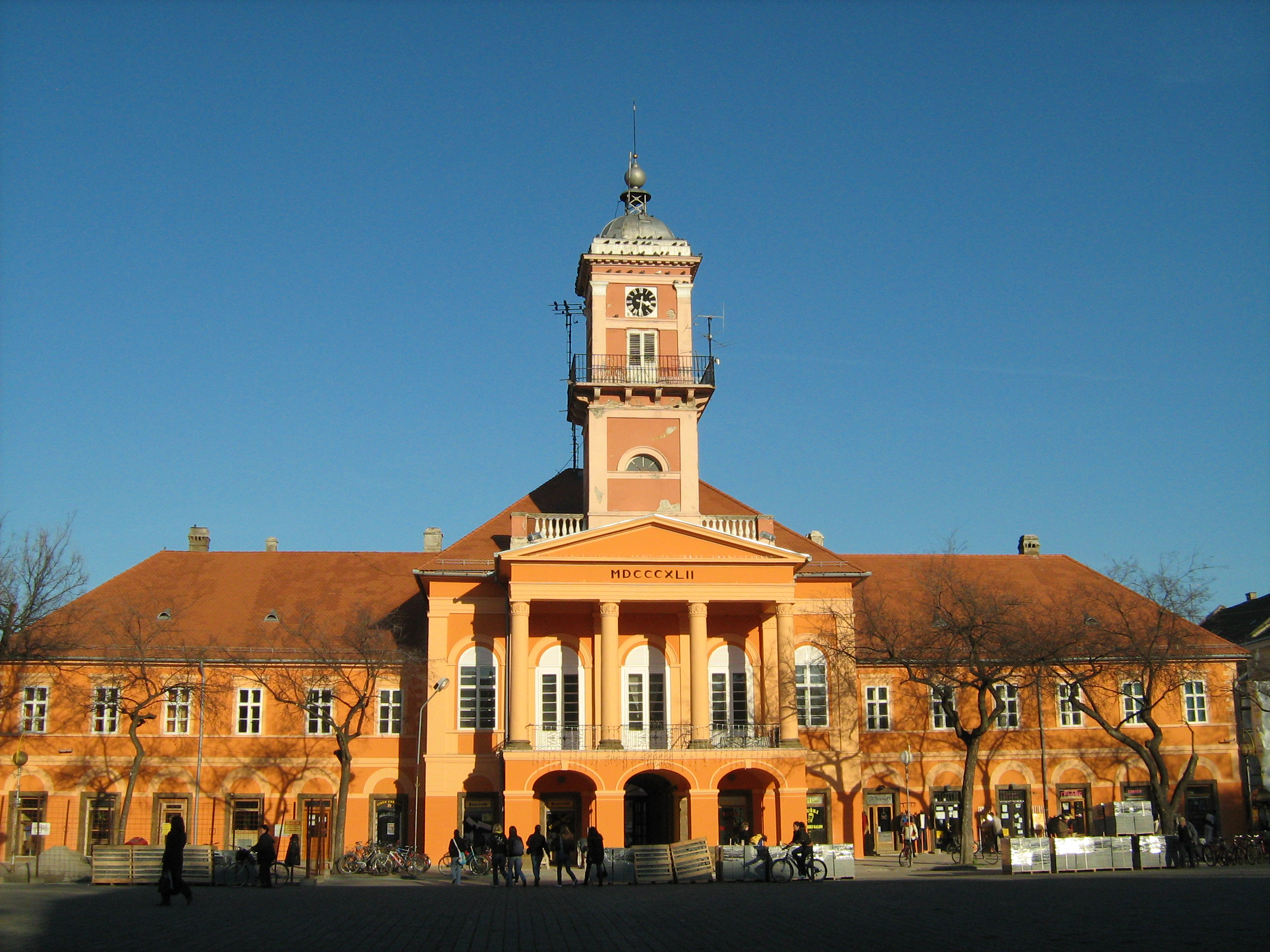
The old city hall of Sombor was originally Jovan Branković's house, whose south-eastern part is still preserved in the modern-day building.

The Branković family was a Serb noble family based in the Military Frontier of the Habsburg Empire during the 18th and 19th centuries. The family traced its nobility back to Đorđe Branković (1645–1711), who was created an Imperial Count in 1688. After his death, his title was passed on to his relative Jovan Branković (1675–1734), who served as an officer in the Habsburg army in the Military Frontier, as did most of his male descendants. They participated in various wars waged by the Habsburgs. The last Count of Podgorica died in 1856, ending the male line of Jovan Branković.

== Jovan Branković ==
Đorđe Branković, born in 1645, was a Transylvanian Serb diplomat, writer, and self-proclaimed descendant of the medieval Serbian Branković dynasty. In 1688, the Habsburg Emperor Leopold I created him an Imperial Count, but had him arrested in 1689. From 1690 until his death in 1711, Đorđe Branković lived as a captive in Vienna and Cheb. Since at least 1700, his personal attendant was his relative Jovan Branković born in around 1675 in the Transylvanian town of Lipova. The exact kinship relation between Jovan and Đorđe, who had no children, remains unclear. As Jovan was not a descendant of Đorđe, the latter's title could have been officially passed on to Jovan only through a special grant by the Habsburg emperor, but no document to that effect is known to have existed. Regardless of that, Jovan came to be tacitly recognized as a count.

After Đorđe Branković's death in 1711, Jovan Branković joined the Serbian Militia, a unit of the Habsburg army that was mostly active in the Military Frontier of the empire. He distinguished himself in battles with the Ottomans and rose through the army ranks. In 1717 he was appointed commander of the city of Sombor. He was first mentioned as a count in the Treaty of Passarowitz, signed in 1718 between the Ottomans and the Habsburgs. In the same year, Jovan began to build his mansion, which would be turned into the city hall of Sombor in 1749. The south-eastern part of the mansion is still preserved in the modern-day building. Jovan married Marija of the Kostić family, with whom he had a daughter, Jelena, born in 1721, and two sons: Nikola born in 1729, and Jovan born in 1733. Jovan senior died of an illness in 1734.

== Jovan Branković's children ==
The daughter of Jovan Branković, Jelena, married Đorđe Čarnojević from Futog, who was an adopted son of Mihajlo Čarnojević, Count of Mačva. Jovan's widow, Marija, moved in 1749 with her sons to the village of Boljevci near Zemun. In December of the same year, her eldest son Nikola joined the Syrmian Hussar Regiment, with which he participated in the Seven Years' War. Nikola married Ana of the Putnik noble family. Mojsije Putnik, the Serbian Orthodox Metropolitan of Karlovci, and Avram Putnik, a general in the Habsburg army, were Ana's uncles.

In 1766, Ana and Nikola moved from Boljevci to the nearby village of Ugrinovci. They had six sons and three daughters; their third son, Petar, died at an early age. After his hussar regiment was disbanded in 1786, Nikola was transferred to the Petrovaradin Infantry Regiment, and given the rank of captain first class. He retired in 1800, after fifty years of active service in the Habsburg army. Nikola died in Ugrinovci in 1804.

The second son of Jovan Branković from Lipova, also named Jovan, joined at the age of sixteen the Syrmian Hussar Regiment, together with his brother Nikola. Jovan participated in several wars, including the Seven Years' War and the War of Bavarian Succession. He married in 1763 and had three children: the daughters Pulherija and Jelisaveta, and the son Mihajlo. Jovan suddenly died at the age of 54, in 1787, three years after his wife's death. His minor children were adopted by their uncle Nikola. Jovan was posthumously promoted to the rank of major.

== Jovan Branković's grandchildren ==
The first son of Nikola Branković, Đorđe Branković, was born at the beginning of 1766. His army career started in 1784 in the Petrovaradin Regiment. Afterwards, he served in several units of the Habsburg army, including the Serbian Freikorps, and the Slunj, Brod, and Gradiška Regiments. He retired in 1824 in the rank of colonel, the highest rank obtained by any of the Brankovićs. Army documents describe Đorđe as a courageous and deserving officer who participated in sixteen wars. He never married and had no children. After his retirement, Đorđe lived in Karlovac, Novi Sad, and Laćarak, where he died in 1830.

Nikola's second son, Dimitrije Branković, was born on 19 October 1770. In 1788 he joined the Serbian Freikorps together with his older brother; he later served in the Petrovaradin Regiment. He was promoted to the rank of captain first class in 1804, the year when the First Serbian Uprising began in the Ottoman-held Serbia. The leader of the uprising, Karađorđe, had also served in the Serbian Freikorps, and Dimitrije was acquainted with him. General Geneyne, the commander of the Slavonian Military Frontier, appointed Dimitrije as his liaison officer with influential Serbs in the empire, and, through them, with the insurgents in Serbia. In 1805, however, Dimitrije requested and received a discharge from the army. In the same year he married Marija, a rich and young widow in the town of Karlovci. She died next year giving birth, eighteen days before her newborn child died. Dimitrije soon entered his second marriage, which was childless. He was regarded as the most prominent of the six noblemen in Karlovci at the beginning of the 19th century. He died in 1836.

Nikola's fourth son, Stefan Branković, was born on 17 November 1777. Stefan joined the Petrovaradin Regiment when he was nineteen. He participated in all Napoleonic Wars, but he slowly rose through the ranks, retiring in 1838 in the rank of major. He was a representative at the Serbian National Congress held in 1842 in Karlovci for the purpose of electing the new Metropolitan of Karlovci. Josif Rajačić was then elected, though Stefan voted for another candidate. His wife, Jelena, was the hostess of the Serb ball held in 1844 in Novi Sad. Stefan died childless in 1852, and his wife died in 1859 as the last Countess of Podgorica.

Nikola's fifth son, Pavle Branković, was born on 5 March 1780. He became a soldier in 1799 and participated in Napoleonic Wars, serving in the Petrovaradin, Lika, and Brod Regiments. On 28 June 1815, Pavle and the companies under his command successfully defended a bridge on the Arly river at the town of Conflans in Savoie, France. The feat earned him the Knight's Cross; he later received two more decorations. He was the commander of the Lika Frontier district, before retiring in 1843 ranked lieutenant colonel. He and his wife Ana then moved to Timișoara, and later to Novi Sad. Ana and Pavle had only one child, a daughter who died young. Several years after his retirement, Pavle became blind. He died on 11 July 1856 in Novi Sad as the last "Count of Podgorica", ending the male line of Jovan Branković from Lipova. His funeral was conducted by Bishop Platon Atanacković with the participation of numerous priests and an honorary military escort consisting of a battalion of the Petrovaradin Regiment.

Nikola's sixth and youngest son, Avram Branković, was born on 21 February 1782. He studied law in Budapest, which he finished in 1804. He became a Serbian Orthodox cleric and taught at the recently established Theology Faculty in Karlovci. At that time, he was one of only two teachers at the faculty, the other being Lukijan Mušicki. Avram became a monk and took the monastic name of Antonije. Stefan Stratimirović, the Metropolitan of Karlovci, entrusted Antonije with various tasks. In 1819 Antonije was appointed the archimandrite of the Grgeteg Monastery, and in 1824 he became the Bishop of Pakrac. He was regarded as the most likely successor to Metropolitan Stratimirović. However, he suddenly died in 1824, at the age of 42.

After Jovan Branković junior's death, his children were adopted by their uncle Nikola. The eldest, Pulherija, married in 1792 Jeftimije Nović from Krčedin, an officer in the Petrovaradin Regiment. He would be given a nobility rank in 1812 by the Habsburg Emperor Francis I. Descendants of Pulherija and Jeftimije lived in 1998 in Novi Sad and Belgrade. As for Pulherija's siblings, Jelisaveta and Mihajlo, neither of them married or had children. Mihajlo graduated from a military academy in 1800, and he was immediately sent to a war. He retired in 1829 in the rank of captain. He lived in Slavonski Brod, where he died in 1854.

== See also ==
- List of Habsburg Serbs
