= Paul Davidovich =

Austrian general (1737–1814)

Paul von Davidovich
- Павле Давидовић; Pavle Davidović
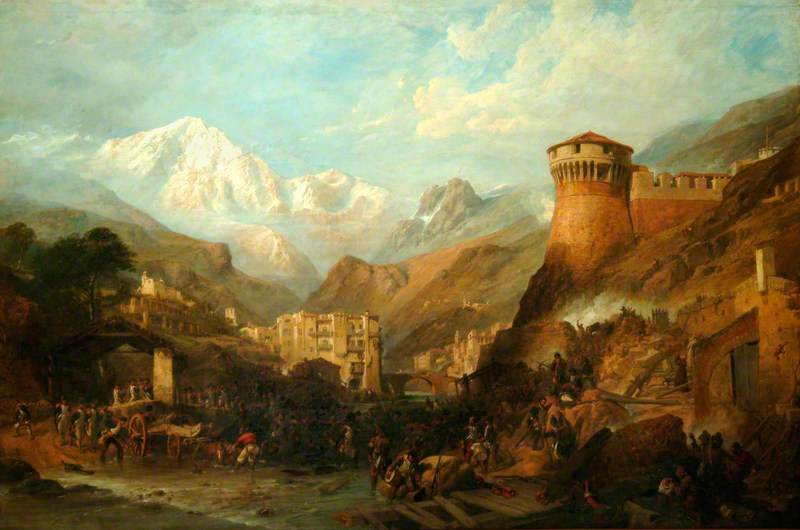
- Battle of Roveredo by Clarkson Frederick Stanfield shows a clash where Davidovich was worsted.
- Born: 1737; Buda, Habsburg monarchy
- Died: 18 February 1814 (aged 76–77); Komárno, Austrian Empire
- Military career
- Allegiance: Habsburg Monarchy; Austrian Empire
- Branch: Infantry
- Service years: 1757–1814
- Rank: Feldzeugmeister
- Conflicts: Seven Years' War; War of the Bavarian Succession; Action at Habelschwerdt (1779); Austro-Turkish War; Surrender of Šabac (1788); Brabant Revolution; War of the First Coalition; Siege of Valenciennes (1793); Battle of Grand-Reng (1794); Battle of Erquelinnes (1794); Siege of Mannheim (1795); Battle of Castiglione (1796); Battle of Rovereto (1796); Battle of Calliano (1796); War of the Third Coalition; Battle of Caldiero (1805); War of the Fifth Coalition; Battle of Raab (1809)
- Awards: Military Order of Maria Theresa, Knight's Cross
- Other work: Inhaber Infantry Regiment Nr. 34

Baron Paul von Davidovich or Pavle Davidović (Serbian Cyrillic: Павле Давидовић) (1737, Buda – 18 February 1814, Komárom) became a general of the Austrian Empire and a Knight of the Military Order of Maria Theresa. He served in the Seven Years' War and the War of the Bavarian Succession, winning the Knight's Cross of the Military Order of Maria Theresa in the latter conflict. He fought in the Austro-Turkish War and the Brabant Revolution, attaining the rank of general officer. During the French Revolutionary Wars, he fought in the Flanders Campaign and the Rhine campaign of 1795 before being transferred to the Italian theater. He played a major role in the 1796 campaign, leading corps-sized commands in the fighting against the French army led by Napoleon Bonaparte. He led troops during the War of the Third Coalition and War of the Fifth Coalition. He was Proprietor (Inhaber) of an Austrian infantry regiment.

== Early career ==
Paul Davidovich was born in Buda (Ofen) (in modern-day Budapest, Hungary) in 1737. He joined the Austrian Ferdinand Karl Infantry Regiment Nr. 2 as a volunteer on 1 February 1757. He served during the Seven Years' War and rose to the rank of Captain. On 17 November 1771, he received promotion to Major in d'Alton Infantry Regiment Nr. 19. On 18 January 1779, he performed heroically under fire at Bystrzyca Kłodzka (Habelschwerdt) during the War of the Bavarian Succession. When the second column found itself confronting the stoutly defended Bohemian Gate, Davidovich offered to find a way through. Leading 60 volunteers, he scaled a palisade, and rushing through heavy fire, reached the Bohemian Gate from the rear and broke it open. Then he captured a Prussian cannon and its crew while wounding and capturing Colonel von Wedel. Soon after, he captured the garrison commander, the Landgrave of Hesse-Philippsthal. This exploit earned him the Knight's Cross of the Military Order of Maria Theresa on 19 May 1779.

Davidovich was rewarded with the noble rank of Freiherr in 1780. He became Oberstleutnant of the Esterhazy Infantry Regiment Nr. 34 on 9 November 1781. He was promoted Oberst (colonel) on 8 November 1783. He assumed command of the Peterwardeiner Grenz Infantry Regiment Nr. 9 in 1785, succeeding Wilhelm von Ried. He relinquished command to Thaddäus Oesterreicher in 1789. During the Austro-Turkish War (1788–1791), Davidovich talked the Turkish governor of Šabac into surrendering on 24 April 1788. He took command of the Broder Grenz Infantry Regiment Nr. 7 from Michael Chernel von Chernelháza in 1789. Peter Tersich von Kadesich assumed leadership of the regiment in 1790. Davidovich assisted Maximilian Anton Karl, Count Baillet de Latour in stamping out the 1789 Belgian revolt. He was elevated to the rank of Generalmajor on 16 January 1790 with rank from 8 December 1789.

== French Revolutionary Wars ==
In 1793–1794 during the War of the First Coalition, Davidovich participated in the Flanders campaign under Prince Josias of Saxe-Coburg-Saalfeld. He missed the Battle of Neerwinden on 18 March 1793 because his brigade was detached and posted at Huy. The brigade was made up of 2 battalions of Tuscany Infantry Regiment Nr. 23 and 1 battalion of Feldjägers. During the Siege of Valenciennes in May 1793, he commanded an outpost at Houdain-lez-Bavay that was made up of 1 battalion each of the Kaunitz Infantry Regiment Nr. 20 and Wenzel Colloredo Infantry Regiment Nr. 56, 3 companies of the Mahony Jagers, 2 companies of Serbian Light Infantry, and 2 squadrons of the Wurmser Hussar Regiment Nr. 8. He led an infantry brigade in the army of Franz Wenzel, Graf von Kaunitz-Rietberg at the Battle of Grand-Reng on 13 May 1794. The brigade included 2 battalions of Hohenlohe Infantry Regiment Nr. 17 and 1 battalion of Jellacic Infantry Regiment Nr. 53. Graf Kaunitz praised the efforts of Davidovich and Franz von Werneck on 21 May at the Battle of Erquelinnes. In the successful Austrian surprise attack on 24 May, Davidovich commanded the third column which consisted of 6 battalions, 1 company, 6 squadrons, and 12 position guns. He served under Dagobert Sigmund von Wurmser in the successful Siege of Mannheim which capitulated on 22 November 1795. Davidovich was promoted to Feldmarschall-Leutnant on 4 March 1796 to rank from 30 June 1795.

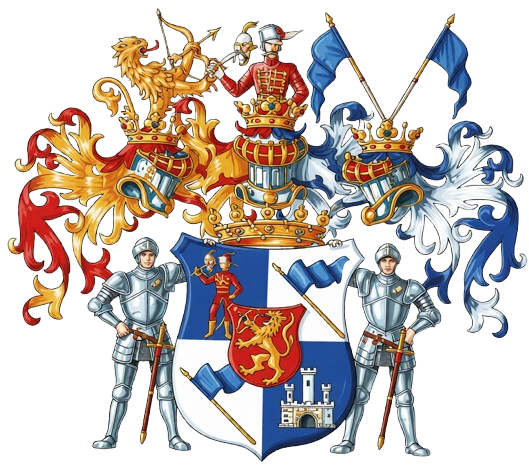
Coat of Arms of Pavle Davidović

During the spring of 1796, Napoleon's French army overran the Kingdom of Sardinia-Piedmont and the Duchy of Milan, and began the Siege of Mantua. In July, Davidovich transferred to the Italian theater and was placed under Wurmser's command. During the first relief of Mantua, he commanded the Left-Center (III) Column, which included 11 battalions and 10 squadrons in the brigades of Anton Ferdinand Mittrowsky, Anton Lipthay, and Leberecht Spiegel. The force numbered 8,274 infantry, 1,618 cavalry, 32 cannon, and 8 howitzers. Davidovich fought at the Battle of Castiglione on 5 August.

Third relief of Mantua, first phase: The battles of San Michele, 2nd Bassano, and Calliano, November 1796.

In the second relief of Mantua, Wurmser and his chief of staff Franz von Lauer planned to transfer major elements of the army from the upper Adige valley to Bassano del Grappa via the Valsugana. They assigned Davidovich a 19,555-man corps of which 13,500 soldiers in the brigades of the Prince of Reuss, Josef Vukassovich, and Johann Rudolf von Sporck would hold the upper Adige. Lauer believed that the French army was so mauled that it would remain passive during the operation. Defying expectations, Bonaparte attacked Davidovich with 33,000 men. In the Battle of Rovereto on 4 September, the French swamped the Austrian defenses and inflicted 3,000 casualties in a very rapid advance. Davidovich was compelled to abandon Trento and retreat north beyond Lavis. Bonaparte soon won the Battle of Bassano and drove Wurmser and 12,000 men within the fortress of Mantua.

For the third relief of Mantua, Emperor Francis II appointed József Alvinczi commander of a newly formed army. Alvinczi, Davidovich, Sporck, and Franz von Weyrother planned the main army to advance on Mantua from the east while Davidovich moved south from the Adige valley in the north. Alvinczi would accompany the main army of 26,432 men. Davidovich's Tyrol Corps counted 18,427 infantry and 1,049 cavalry. It included the brigades of Sporck, Vukassovich, Johann Laudon, and Joseph Ocskay, plus a small reserve.

After a bloody clash at San Michele all'Adige on 2 November, Davidovich advanced south to recapture Trento. He complained to Alvinczi that his newly recruited soldiers lacked equipment, straggled badly, and were short of officers. He routed Claude Vaubois' outnumbered French division at the Battle of Calliano on 7 November. Despite being urged by Alvinczi to attack again, he proved very slow to follow up his success. One reason was the 3,567 Austrian casualties suffered at San Michele and Calliano. Other difficulties included a false report that placed André Masséna's division in his front, heavy snow in the mountains, and the fact that messages took two days to arrive from Alvinczi. Davidovich routed Vaubois again at Rivoli Veronese on 17 November, but this victory came two days too late. After the French defeated Alvinczi on 15–17 November at the Battle of Arcole, Bonaparte turned on Davidovich in great strength. The French beat him in a second clash at Rivoli on 22 November. With Davidovich's corps in flight northward, Alvinczi was forced to abandon the campaign. Bonaparte won by only a small margin. The Austrians reported losses of 17,832 while French losses may have been as high as 19,507.

== Napoleonic Wars ==
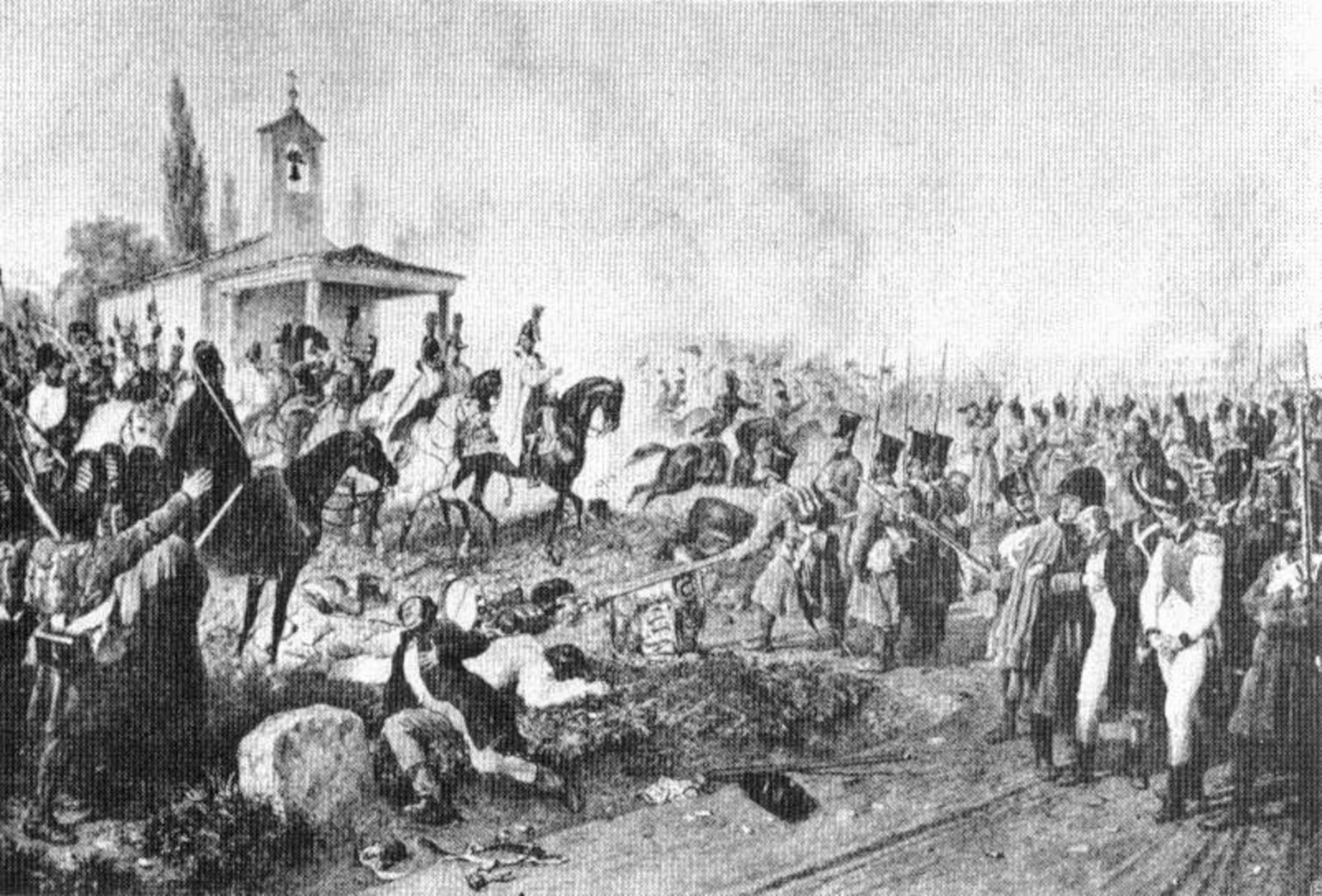
Archduke Charles at Caldiero (1805)

In 1804, Davidovich became the proprietor of Infantry Regiment Nr. 34, a Hungarian unit, and held this position until his death in 1814. The previous inhaber was Paul Kray and the subsequent inhaber was Prince Friedrich-Ludwig of Wied-Runkel. When the War of the Third Coalition broke out, he commanded part of Archduke Charles' army in Italy. During the Battle of Caldiero on 29–31 October 1805, he led the nine infantry battalions, eight cavalry squadrons, and 26 artillery pieces of the left wing. After the war, he served as deputy (Adlatus) to the commanding general in Slavonia and inspected fortresses in Serbia. He received promotion to Feldzeugmeister in May 1807. In his last active command, he led a division of Hungarian insurrection militia at the Battle of Raab on 14 June 1809 during the War of the Fifth Coalition. He died on 18 February 1814 at Komárno when he was governor of that fortress.

== See also ==
- Paul von Radivojevich
- Martin von Dedovich
- Andreas Karaczay (Andrija Karadžić)
- Arsenije Sečujac
- Karl Paul von Quosdanovich
- Peter Vitus von Quosdanovich
- Mathias Rukavina von Boynograd
- Joseph Philipp Vukassovich
- Franjo Vlašić
- Gavrilo Rodić
- Adam Bajalics von Bajahaza
- Josif Šišković
- Leonidas von Popp

== Notes ==
Military offices
| Preceded by Wilhelm von Ried | Oberst of Peterwardeiner Grenz Infantry Regiment Nr. 9; 1785–1789 | Succeeded by Thaddäus Oesterreicher |
| Preceded by Michael Chernel von Chernelháza | Oberst of Broder Grenz Infantry Regiment Nr. 7; 1789–1790 | Succeeded by Peter Tersich von Kadesich |
| Preceded by Paul Kray | Proprietor (Inhaber) of Infantry Regiment Nr. 34; 1804–1814 | Succeeded by Prince Friedrich-Ludwig of Wied-Runkel |
