= General of the Artillery (Austria) =

Military rank

General of the Artillery (Feldzeugmeister) was a historical military rank in some German and Austro-Hungarian armies, specifically in artillery. It was commonly used in the 16th and 17th centuries, and survived until the beginning of the 20th century in some European countries. In the army of the Habsburg Empire, the rank of Feldzeugmeister was equivalent with lieutenant general.

== Etymology ==
The German term Feldzeugmeister literally translates as "ordnance master" or "gun master". (Feld- means battlefield, as used in the German title for field marshal (Feldmarschall), and -zeug- refers to the guns used by the artillery.) In French, the equivalent expression was Grand maitre d'artillerie, used since the days of Philip VI of France (r. 1328–1350).

== Military rank ==
Originally, the ranks above Feldzeugmeister were Feldhauptmann and Feldmarschall. The third most important person in the army was the Feldzeugmeister. Although the expression was common in the German artillery, Austrian, Hungarian and French militias also used the title. The position of a Feldzeugmeister differed by German states. In Austria-Hungary, the Feldzeugmeister was one of three separate general of the branch ranks.

In 1898, the Ministry of War of the Kingdom of Prussia created the position of a Feldzeugmeister which was comparable to the commander of a division. The Feldzeugmeister was in charge of delivering weapons, ammunition and personnel.

In Bavaria of 1906, the inspection of weapons was organised by the department of the Feldzeugmeister.

== Austro-Hungarian Army ==
Rank insignia of an Austria-Hungarian Feldzeugmeister (equal to General der Infanterie and General der Kavallerie)

In the Austrian and Hungarian service, Feldzeugmeister (in Hungarian Táborszernagy) had a different meaning. During the Napoleonic Wars, the Feldzeugmeister held the rank just above Feldmarschallleutnant and just below Feldmarschall (field marshal). It was a roughly equivalent rank to full general. Feldzeugmeister was equal to general of the infantry (General der Infanterie) and general of the cavalry (General der Kavallerie). It remained the second highest rank of the Austrian army until the creation of colonel-general (Generaloberst) in 1915. Originally members of the infantry and artillery were given this rank, while members of the cavalry would become generals of the cavalry. From 1908 onwards the rank Feldzeugmeister was given to members of the artillery only.

Junior rank Feldmarschallleutnant	Austro-Hungarian armed forces rank Feldzeugmeister	Senior rank Generaloberst

== See also ==
- List of Feltzeugmeister of the Holy Roman Empire
- Reichszeugmeisterei
- Master-General of the Ordnance
