= Johann Rudolf von Sporck =

Austrian general (1755–1806)

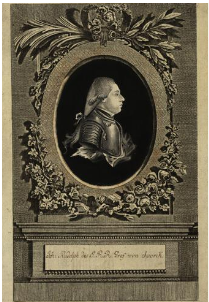
- Johann Rudolf von Sporck
- Born: 27 November 1755; Prague, Bohemia
- Died: 10 February 1806 (aged 50); Vienna, Austrian Empire
- Military career
- Allegiance: Habsburg Monarchy; Austrian Empire
- Branch: Infantry
- Rank: Feldmarschall-Leutnant
- Conflicts: Austro-Turkish War (1788–1791); Action at Lubina; War of the First Coalition; Siege of Le Quesnoy; Battle of Mouscron; Battle of Courtrai; Rhine campaign of 1795; Battle of Lonato; Battle of Rovereto; Battle of Calliano; Battle of Stockach; Battle of Messkirch; Battle of Iller River
- Other work: Inhaber Infantry Regiment Nr. 25

Johann Rudolf von Sporck or Spork (Note: Smith & Kudrna and Schmidt-Brentano spelled the name "Sporck" while Boycott-Brown, Ebert, and Wrede spelled it "Spork".) (27 November 1755 – 10 February 1806) served as an Austrian general during the French Revolutionary Wars. He fought in the Austro-Turkish War in 1789–1790. He led an infantry regiment in 1792–1793 and was promoted Generalmajor at the beginning of 1794. He fought in the Flanders campaign in 1792–1794 and in the Rhine campaign of 1795. After being transferred to Italy, he led a brigade at Lonato, Rovereto, and Calliano in 1796. He was promoted to Feldmarschall-Leutnant in 1797 and led a division in 1800 at Engen, Messkirch, and the Iller River. In 1801 he became the inhaber (proprietor) of an infantry regiment. He died in 1806.

== Early career ==
Johann Rudolf von Sporck was born on 27 November 1755 in Prague. His noble parents were Johann Karl, Graf von Spork and Theresia Gräfin von Thürheim. His sisters were Maria Karolina Josefa von Clam-Gallas (1752–1799) and Maria Josefa (b. 1753). Johann Rudolf joined the army of the Habsburg monarchy at an early age. On 27 November 1787 he was promoted to Major and on 9 March 1789 he was promoted again to Oberstleutnant. In the war with Ottoman Turkey, he served with the 2nd Banat Grenz Infantry Regiment Nr. 11. On 24 July 1789, in an unnamed skirmish, he drove off a superior force of Turks by leading a flank attack. In May 1790, he led part of his regiment to the relief of the Lubina blockhouse, which was under assault by the Turks. At the end of the war, he transferred to the Brechainville Infantry Regiment Nr. 25. (Note: Both Ebert (2022) and Wrede (1898b) asserted that he became Oberst in command of Infantry Regiment Nr. 23 in 1792. Smith & Kudrna (2008) stated that he became Oberst on 9 June 1789, which is probably incorrect.)

== Fighting the French ==
In 1792, Sporck became Oberst (colonel) in command of Grand Duke of Tuscany Infantry Regiment Nr. 23. He assumed command from Franz von Rottenburg and in 1794 would be succeeded by Anton Bürger. At the start of the War of the First Coalition the regiment was stationed in the Austrian Netherlands. On 23 April 1792, part of the regiment took part in a reconnaissance of Maubeuge. Two battalions of the regiment served during the Siege of Le Quesnoy from 28 August to 13 September 1793. On 1 January 1794, Sporck was promoted Generalmajor to rank from 17 December 1793. He fought at the Battle of Mouscron on 28–29 April 1794. In the aftermath of the Battle of Courtrai, at Ingelmunster on 12 May he led a brigade consisting of two battalions of the Sztáray Infantry Regiment Nr. 33, the 2nd Battalion of the Callenberg Infantry Regiment Nr. 54, and two guns. (Note: In the Ingelmunster reference, his name was spelled "Sponek", but there was no such general during the era. It is assumed to be a misprint of "Sporck" (Smith, p. 78).)

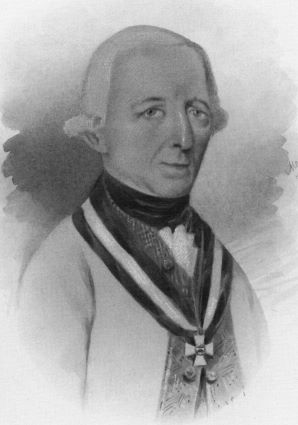
Peter Quasdanovich

Sporck served in the Army of the Upper Rhine during the Rhine campaign of 1795. In early 1796, he was among the troops transferred to Italy. On 29 July 1796, the Austrian army commander Dagobert Sigmund von Wurmser launched the first relief of the Siege of Mantua. Of the four relieving columns, Spork was assigned to lead a brigade in the I Column of Peter Vitus von Quosdanovich. The other three brigades were led by Joseph Ocskay, Peter Ott, and Prince Reuss. The two advanced guards were led by the Marquis of Lusignan and Johann von Klenau. Quasdanovich's column counted 15,272 infantry, 2,349 cavalry, and 24 position guns. Klenau captured Brescia by surprise on 30 July and his troops were soon joined by the brigades of Sporck and Reuss. The Battle of Lonato was an intricate series of actions fought on the west side of Lake Garda over the next few days in which Napoleon Bonaparte's French army made its main effort against Quasdanovich's column while holding back the rest of Wurmser's army. On the night of 3 August, Quasdanovich decided to attack Salò but both Ott and Sporck argued against it on the grounds that their troops were low on ammunition and food. Reuss soon arrived with the news that Ocskay's brigade had been destroyed. Quasdanovich elected to withdraw from the area after hearing no news of Wurmser and seeing I Column reduced to only 10,000 troops.

At the end of August 1796, Wurmser reorganized his army for the second relief of Mantua. He appointed Paul Davidovich to lead a corps that would defend the Tyrol while Wurmser marched to Bassano via the Valsugana. Davidovich's corps numbered 19,555 men of which the brigades of Sporck and Josef Philipp Vukassovich counted 7,840 infantry and 626 cavalry. Unexpectedly, the French attacked these two brigades with overwhelming force in the Battle of Rovereto in the morning of 4 September, driving them back after a hard combat. Davidovich assigned the 1,700 men of Preiss Infantry Regiment Nr. 24 to hold a narrow defile north of Rovereto. Thinking that they were protected, the 4,800 remaining soldiers of Sporck and Vukassovich bivouacked and began to cook dinner. However, the French rapidly overran the Preiss Regiment and at 4:00 pm charged into the camp without warning, routing both brigades. By the next day, 75% of Sporck's men were casualties or dispersed and 1,000 of Vukassovich's soldiers were casualties.

Map shows the opening moves of the Arcole campaign. Sporck helped plan the operation.

József Alvinczi was selected as the Austrian army commander for the third relief of Mantua. The plans for the operation were drawn up by Sporck and Franz von Weyrother. They called for Davidovich's corps to advance south through the mountains while Alvinczi's main army moved east to Verona via Bassano. At the start of the operation, Davidovich's corps numbered 18,427 infantry and 1,049 cavalry. This significantly outnumbered the 10,500-strong French division opposed to it. Davidovich's corps was divided into six brigade-sized columns, of which the III Column was led by Sporck and included 2,560 infantry. Davidovich defeated the French at the Battle of Calliano on 6–7 November 1796, though the victorious Austrians suffered 3,567 casualties. After defeating Alvinczi at the Battle of Arcole, Bonaparte turned on Davidovich and forced his corps to retreat. The third relief was beaten back by a very narrow margin.

On 1 March 1797, Sporck was promoted to Feldmarschall-Leutnant to rank from 28 February 1797. He served under Archduke Charles in the spring 1797 campaign. From March 1798 to January 1799, he commanded the autonomous corps in the Tyrol. In 1800, he commanded a division in the army of Paul Kray. On 3 May 1800, he fought in the Battles of Stockach and Engen. Sporck was subordinate to Joseph Louis, Prince of Lorraine-Vaudémont who was tasked to defend Stockach against Claude Lecourbe's French corps. While the main armies fought to a draw at Engen, Lecourbe's 20,000 Frenchmen evicted Vaudémont's 12,000 Austrians from Stockach. In the Battle of Messkirch on 5 May, Sporck still fought under Vaudémont. In the Battle of Iller River (or Battle of Erolzheim) on 5 June, Sporck commanded the reserve and was captured by the French when he rode ahead on a personal reconnaissance.

== Later career ==
In 1801, Sporck was appointed inhaber of Infantry Regiment Nr. 25. The previous incumbent was Ludwig Brechainville and the regiment's next inhaber would be Franz Julius Zedtwitz. In 1802 Sporck was appointed Grand Master of the Household to Archduke Anton Victor of Austria. He died in Vienna on 10 February 1806.

== Notes ==
Footnotes

Citations

Military offices
Preceded by Franz von Rottenburg	Oberst (Colonel) of Infantry Regiment Nr. 23; 1792–1794	Succeeded by Anton Bürger
Preceded by Ludwig Brechainville	Proprietor (Inhaber) of Infantry Regiment Nr. 25; 1801–1806	Succeeded by Franz Julius Zedtwitz
