= Ludwig Anton, Count Baillet de Latour =

Austrian general

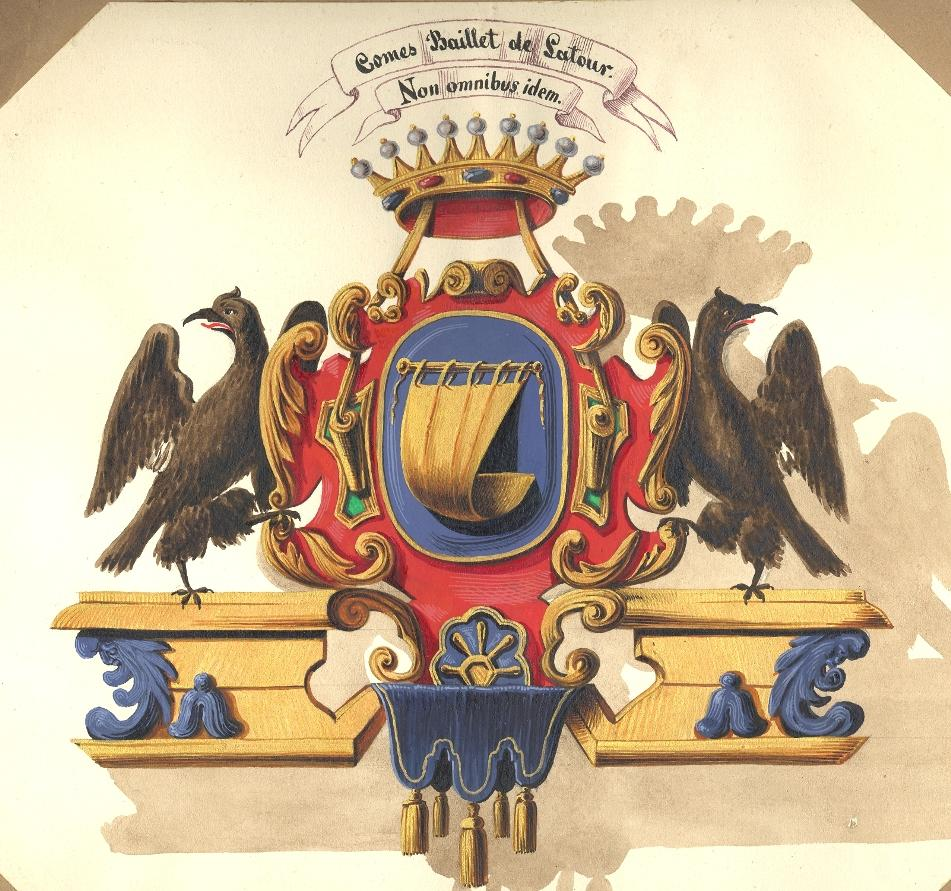
- Baillet de Latour coat of arms
- Born: 12 February 1753; Virton, Belgium
- Died: 1 September 1836 (aged 83); Brussels, Belgium
- Military career
- Allegiance: Habsburg monarchy Austrian Empire; France
- Branch: Infantry
- Service years: 1767–1814
- Rank: Feldzeugmeister
- Conflicts: War of the Bavarian Succession; Austro-Turkish War; Siege of Belgrade; War of the First Coalition; Siege of Le Quesnoy; Battle of Wattignies; Action at Mannheim; Battle of Ettlingen; Battle of Neresheim; Battle of Biberach (1796); Battle of Emmendingen; Battle of Schliengen; War of the Second Coalition; Battle of Ostrach; Battle of Stockach (1799); First Battle of Zurich; Battle of Stockach (1800); Battle of Messkirch; Battle of Biberach (1800); Battle of Hohenlinden; War of the Third Coalition; Ulm campaign
- Awards: Order of Saint Louis KC, 1814

Ludwig Wilhelm Anton, Count Baillet de Latour-Merlemont (12 February 1753 - 1 September 1836) served as an Austrian general during the French Revolutionary Wars. From a noble family, he joined the Austrian army as a volunteer in 1767 and fought in the War of the Bavarian Succession as a commissioned officer. He was promoted to command an infantry regiment in 1788 and fought in the Austro-Turkish War. He became a Generalmajor in 1794 during the War of the First Coalition against France. He fought in the Rhine campaign of 1795 and led a division in numerous battles during the Rhine campaign of 1796. He was known as Count Baillet or Count Baillet-Merlemont to distinguish him from his higher-ranking older brother Maximilian Anton Karl, Count Baillet de Latour. He was promoted Feldmarschall-Leutnant in 1797.

During the War of the Second Coalition, Baillet again led a division in several battles in Germany. During the Ulm campaign in the War of the Third Coalition, he and his division were surrounded and captured in October 1805. From 1807 to 1810, he was the inhaber (proprietor) of an Austrian infantry regiment. He was promoted Feldzeugmeister in 1808. He suddenly resigned his commission in 1810 and transferred his loyalty to France, serving as a General of Division. He retired from the French army in 1814 and died at Brussels in 1836.

== Early career ==
Ludwig Wilhelm Anton, Count Baillet de Latour-Merlemont was born on 12 February 1753 at Latour Castle near Virton in the Austrian Netherlands (modern-day Belgium). On 6 February 1767, he joined the Austrian Salm-Salm Infantry Regiment Nr. 14 as a volunteer. On 1 March 1773, he received promotion to Captain. He led his soldiers during the War of the Bavarian Succession in 1778–1779. He married Charlotte-Angélique-Julienne de Baillet, Baronne de Gesve. He was promoted Major on either 9 May or 9 March 1783. He was elevated in rank to Oberstleutnant on 5 December in either 1783 or 1785. From 1784–1788, he served in the Austrian Netherlands.

On 2 February 1788, Count Baillet was promoted Oberst in command of the Austrian Klebeck Infantry Regiment Nr. 14. He assumed leadership from the previous commander Joseph Zamboni San Collogero and would relinquish command to Eduard Jamez in 1794. The regiment took part in the Austro-Turkish War in 1789. It was present at the Siege of Gradiška (Berbir) and Siege of Belgrade. In 1790, the regiment transferred to the Observation Corps in Moravia. In 1792, the regiment was moved to the middle Rhine in the corps of Friedrich Wilhelm, Fürst zu Hohenlohe-Kirchberg.

== General officer ==
Count Baillet was wounded by a round shot at the Siege of Le Quesnoy in 1793. All 3 battalions of the Klebeck Regiment fought at the Battle of Wattignies on 15–16 October 1793. On 1 January 1794, Baillet was promoted Generalmajor to rank from 10 December 1791. He was employed on the upper Rhine at the Action at Mannheim on 18 October 1795. The following year, he fought under the command of his elder brother Maximilian Anton Karl, Count Baillet de Latour who was referred to as Count Latour. Ludwig Wilhelm Anton was called Count Baillet or Baillet-Merlemont to distinguish him from his older brother.

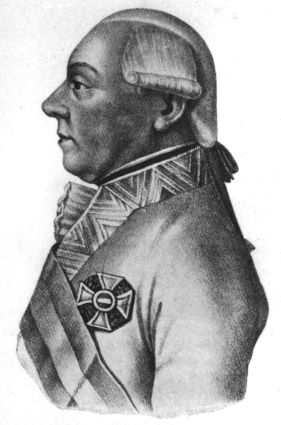
Count Baillet's older brother Count Latour

Count Baillet led troops at the Battle of Ettlingen (Malsch) on 9 July 1796 and the Battle of Neresheim on 11 August 1796. By September, the French Army of the Rhine and Moselle was retreating, pursued by Count Latour's army, while several other Austrian forces maneuvered to surround it. The French commander Jean Victor Marie Moreau determined to strike at Latour's army in order to cripple it. On 30 September, Latour's vanguard under Baillet bumped into a stronger French force at Bad Schussenried and lost 300 prisoners. On 2 October, at the Battle of Biberach, Baillet commanded the Austrian center with 6 or 7 infantry battalions and 12 cavalry squadrons. The reckless Latour got his outnumbered army into a bad position with a river at its back. The French won the battle, capturing 4,000 Austrian soldiers and 18 guns. Baillet also fought at the Battle of Emmendingen on 19 October and the Battle of Schliengen on 24 October 1796. He remained on the upper Rhine as a division commander in 1797. He was promoted Feldmarschall-Leutnant on 1 March 1797 to rank from 26 January 1797.

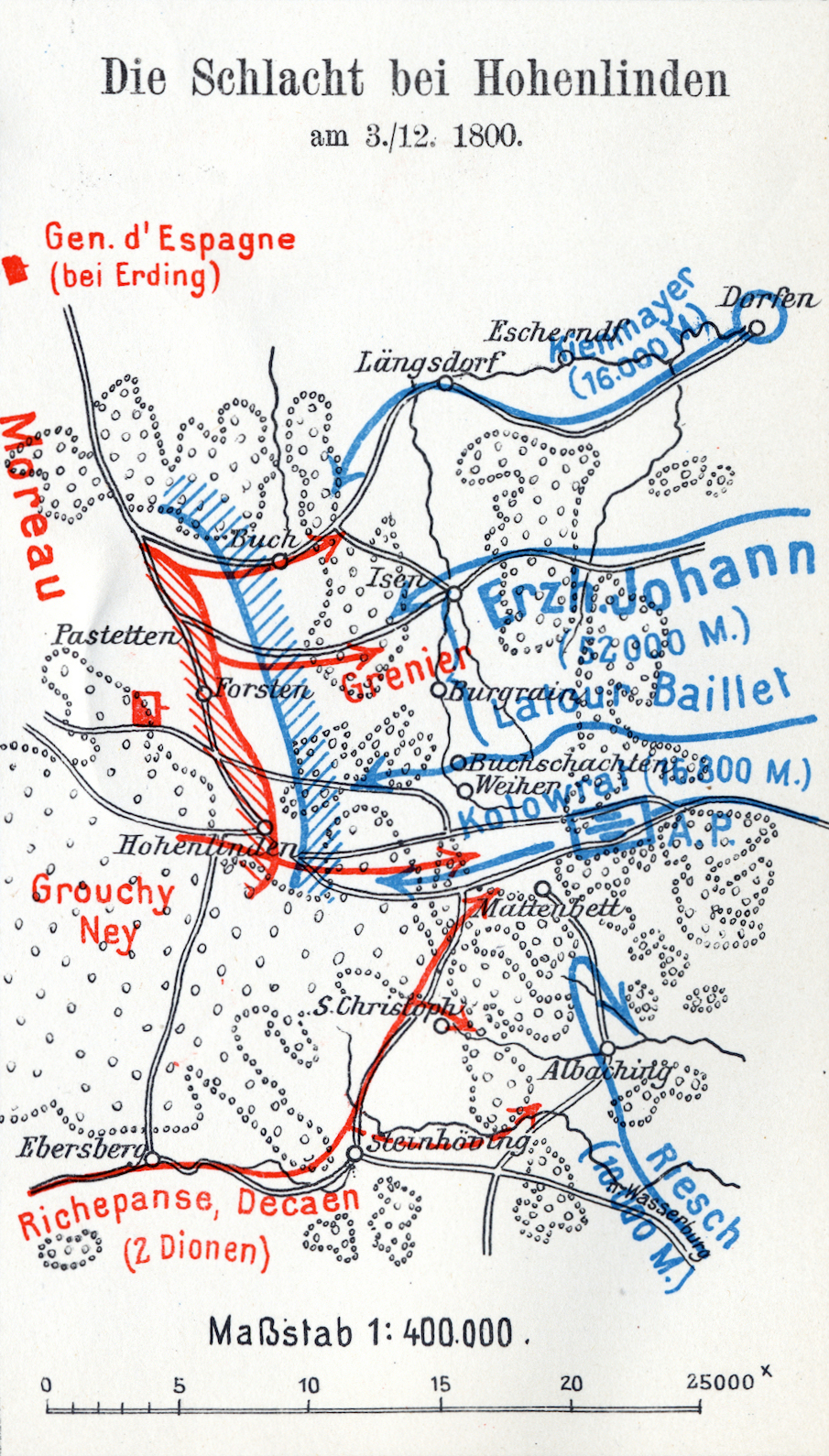
Battle of Hohenlinden, 3 Dec. 1800

At the start of the War of the Second Coalition, Count Baillet commanded a division in the army of Archduke Charles, Duke of Teschen in Swabia. In Spring 1799, Baillet's division consisted of one brigade, that of Generalmajor Anton Ulrich Mylius. The brigade included the Carl Schröder Infantry Regiment Nr. 7, the Lacy Infantry Regiment Nr. 22, and 1 battalion of the Deutsch-Banat Grenz Regiment Nr. 12. (Note: Of the 9 divisions in the army's Corps de Bataille, 3 divisions contained 2 brigades while 6 divisions contained only 1 brigade. (Nafziger 2024)) He led his division at the Battle of Ostrach on 20–21 March, the Battle of Stockach on 25 March, and the First Battle of Zurich on 4–7 June 1799. In Spring 1800, he led a division in Paul Kray's army at the Battle of Stockach on 3 May, the Battle of Messkirch on 4–5 May, and Battle of Biberach on 9 May 1800. In the Battle of Iller River (Erolzheim) on 5 June, Baillet led a corps of 8 battalions and 10 squadrons. At first, his troops were victorious, but Michel Ney's French division appeared and defeated his troops with heavy losses.

The series of defeats in 1800 caused Kray to be sacked. His replacement was the youthful and inexperienced Archduke John of Austria. When a long truce came to an end at the end of November, Archduke John and his aggressive chief of staff Franz von Weyrother started the army on an advance into French-held territory. In the Battle of Hohenlinden on 3 December 1800, the Austrians advanced in four columns, including Count Baillet's Right-Center Column. This included 8,346 infantry and 2,520 cavalry organized into two divisions under Frederick VI, Landgrave of Hesse-Homburg and Friedrich Karl Wilhelm, Fürst zu Hohenlohe. Archduke John and Weyrother wrongly believed that the French were retreating, so the columns were urged to rapidly march west. Since they marched through thickly forested terrain, the columns were not mutually supporting. Advancing along the main highway, the Left-Center Column first came into contact with the French, while Baillet's column traversed terrible roads and fell behind schedule. When the sounds of firing erupted on both sides, Baillet sent units both north and south to establish contact with the neighboring columns. Having dispersed most of his troops, Baillet had little strength left to attack the French. Surrounded on three sides, the Left-Center Column was crushed, resulting in a major French victory. Archduke John blamed three of his column commanders, including Baillet, for the disaster.

== Later career ==
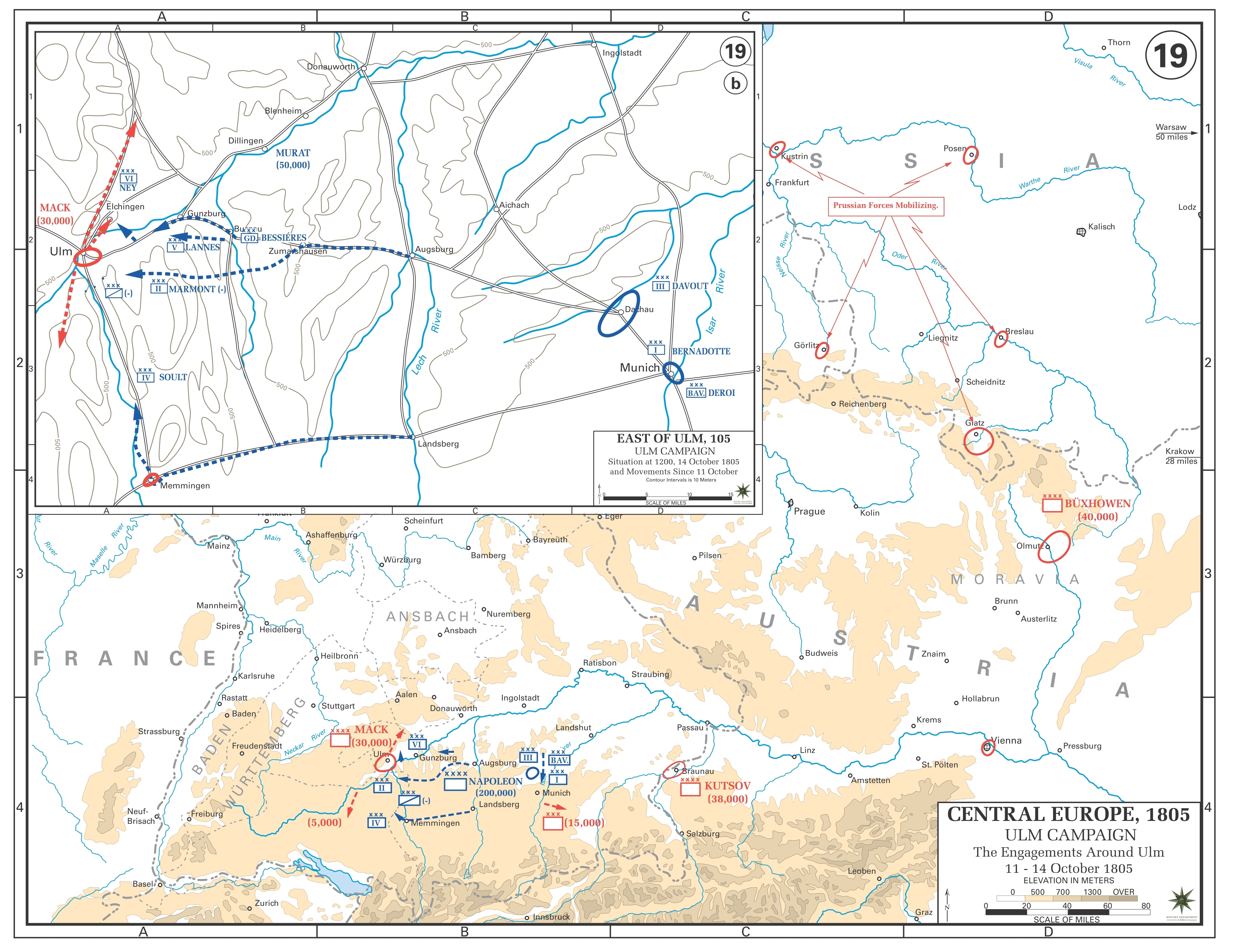
Map shows the Ulm Campaign on 11–14 October 1805. On the inset map, the long red dashed line going to the northeast of Ulm is Werneck's corps. It was captured near the unlabeled dot (Nördlingen) northwest of Donauwörth on the larger map.

In 1805 during the Ulm campaign, Baillet commanded a division of 12 battalions and 14 squadrons in Franz von Werneck's corps in the army of Karl Mack von Leiberich. While Mack's 50,000-man army was facing west at Ulm, Napoleon's much larger French army approached by surprise from the northwest. On 7 October, Mack became aware that Napoleon's army was crossing the Danube in his rear, but he failed to order a retreat. On 13 October, Mack sent Werneck's corps marching northeast to Heidenheim an der Brenz, while the rest of the Austrian army was bottled up near Ulm. Napoleon ordered Joachim Murat's Reserve Cavalry Corps and some infantry from Ney's VI Corps to pursue Werneck's corps, which was slowed by a train of 500 wagons. There were skirmishes along Werneck's line of march at Langenau on 16 October and at Herbrechtingen on 17 October where the French captured 2,500 Austrians. On 18 October 1805, Murat with 28,000 troops compelled Werneck to surrender 15,000 men, 28 guns, and 12 colors at Trochtelfingen, a village 8 km (5 mi) west of Nördlingen. The terms of the capitulation included the surrender of the Reserve Artillery convoys at Kirchheim am Ries and Wallerstein. Only some cavalry units escaped to Bohemia.

In March 1806, Count Baillet was named Governor-General of Inner Austria. In October 1807, he was named Vice President of the Imperial Military Court. He became inhaber (proprietor) of Baillet-Merlemont Infantry Regiment Nr. 63 on 20 July 1807. He succeeded Archduke Joseph of Austria. On 6 September 1808, Baillet was promoted to Feldzeugmeister. On 19 October 1810, he resigned from the Austrian Army and offered to join Napoleon for unknown reasons. On 2 March 1811, Frederick Bianchi, Duke of Casalanza became the next inhaber of Infantry Regiment Nr. 63 after the first choice, Toussant von Bourgeois declined the position on account of old age.

On 6 March 1811, Count Baillet was appointed General of Division in the French army. In May 1812, he was appointed commander of West Prussia and on 16 June 1812 he became governor of Elbląg (Elbing). On 22 December 1812 after the disastrous French invasion of Russia, he received permission to return to France. King Louis XVIII awarded him the Knight's Cross of the Order of Saint Louis on 8 July 1814 and he resigned from the French Royal Army on 24 December 1814. He was made a count (comte) of the Kingdom of France in 1826. Baillet died in Brussels on 1 September 1836.

== Notes ==
Footnotes

Citations

Military offices
Preceded by Joseph Zamboni San Collogero	Oberst (Colonel) of Infantry Regiment Nr. 14; 1788–1794	Succeeded by Eduard Jamez
Preceded by Archduke Joseph of Austria	Proprietor (Inhaber) of Infantry Regiment Nr. 63; 1807–1810	Succeeded by Frederick Bianchi, Duke of Casalanza
