= Rest Now, Weary Head! You Will Get Well Soon =

Album by Get Well Soon

Studio album by Get Well Soon
- Released: January 4, 2008
- Genre: Indie rock
- Length: 54:53
- Label: City Slang; Nude Records

Rest Now, Weary Head! You Will Get Well Soon is the debut album by the German indie rock band Get Well Soon released on January 4, 2008, in Germany, Austria, and Switzerland with the City Slang record label, in UK and Ireland in June 2008 on Nude, and in France in September that year.

The album took three years to produce and was met with mainly positive reviews from most German music magazines. The lyrics were pointed out as having particular strength for their often philosophical and cynical nature. In the UK, NME, Uncut, the Guardian, and Drowned in Sound amongst others, highly rated the album.

The album peaked in the German Album Charts at 28, and the resulting tour consisting of 19 almost completely sold-out shows secured the tour as the most successful newcomer tour in Germany for 2008.

== Track listing ==
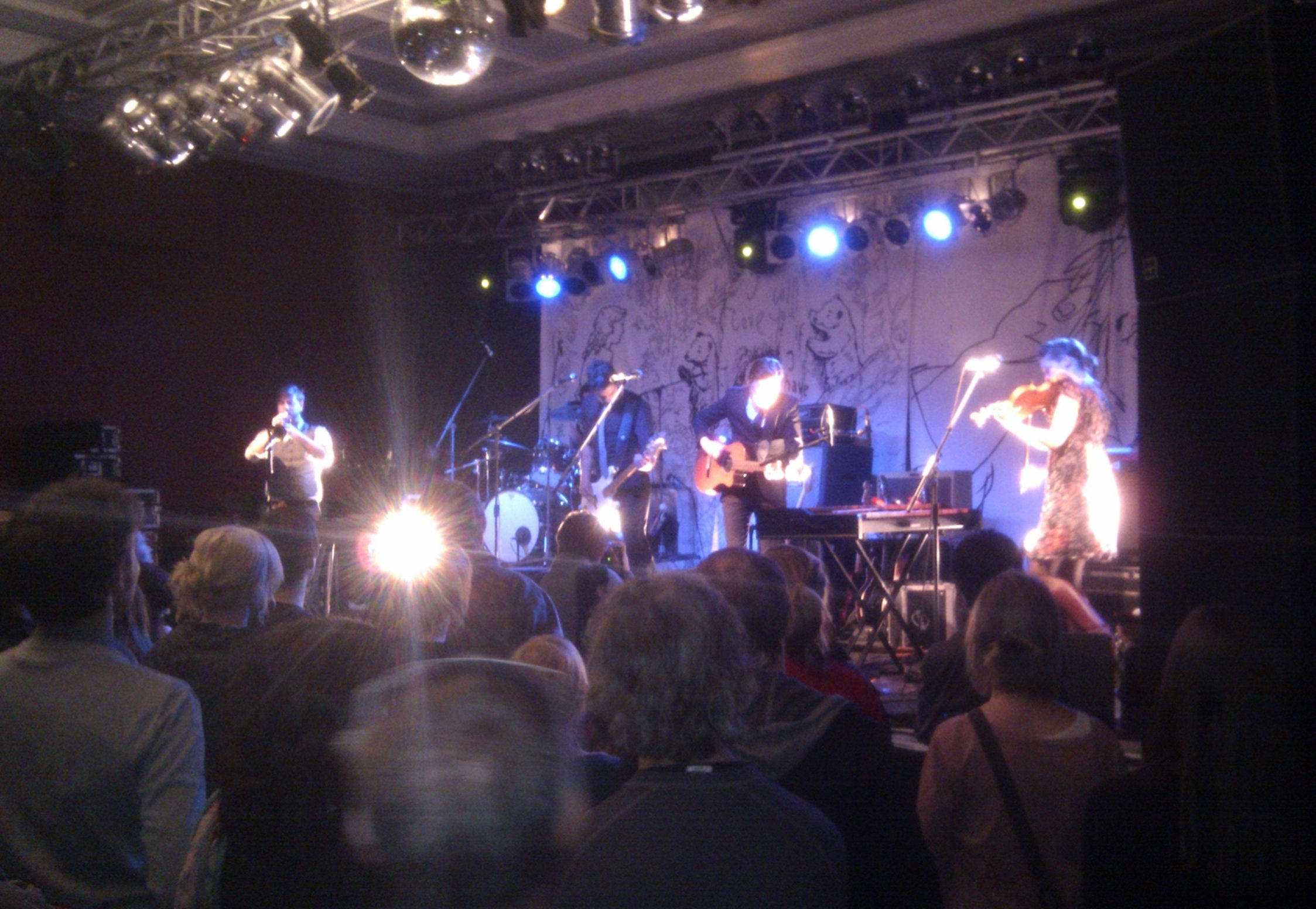
Get Well Soon in Erfurt, Germany.

All tracks are written and composed by Konstantin Gropper.

No.	Title	Length
1.	"Prelude"	2:55
2.	"You/Aurora/You/Seaside"	3:11
3.	"Christmas In Adventure Parks"	3:27
4.	"People Magazine Front Cover"	4:29
5.	"If This Hat Is Missing I Have Gone Hunting"	4:09
6.	"Help To Prevent Forest Fires"	5:14
7.	"I Sold My Hands For Food So Please Feed Me"	6:39
8.	"We Are Safe Inside While They Burn Down Our House"	5:13
9.	"Born Slippy (Nuxx)"	4:54
10.	"Your Endless Dream"	5:33
11.	"Witches! Witches! Rest Now In The Fire"	3:59
12.	"Tick Tack! Goes My Automatic Heart"	3:54
13.	"Lost In The Mountains (Of The Heart)"	5:21
14.	"Coda"	1:08
Total length:		54:53
