= Rhine campaign of 1795 =

Military campaign in Western Germany

Rhine Campaign of 1795
- Part of War of the First Coalition
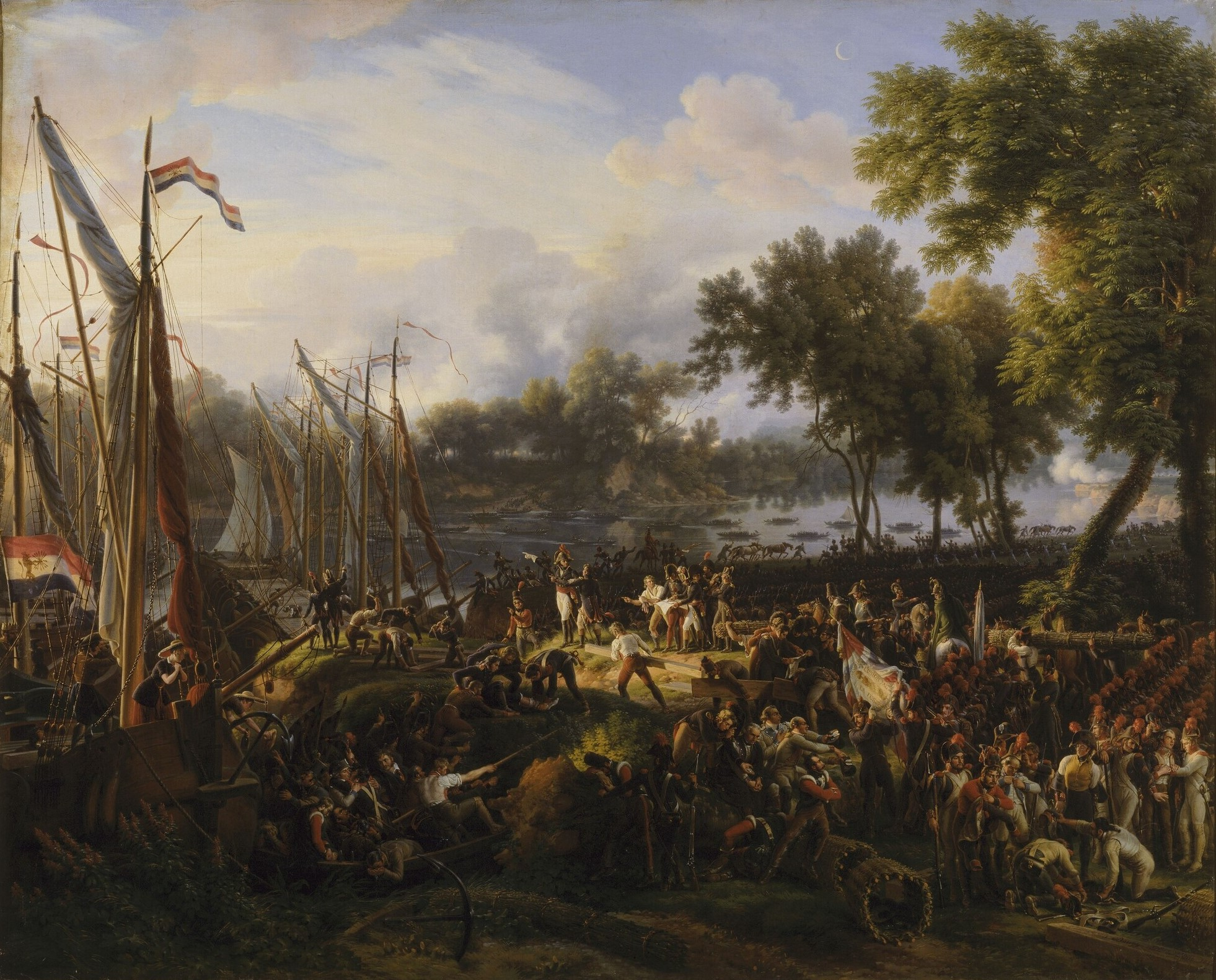
- Crossing of the Rhine by the French army at Düsseldorf, 6 September 1795, by Louis-François Lejeune (1824)
Date	April 1795 to January 1796
Location	Western Germany
Result	Austrian victory

Belligerents
(Habsburg monarchy) Habsburg Austria	(France) French Republic

Commanders and leaders
(Habsburg monarchy) Count of Clerfayt (Habsburg monarchy) Dagobert Wurmser	(France) Jean Jourdan (France) Charles Pichegru

Units involved
(Habsburg monarchy) Army of the Lower Rhine (Habsburg monarchy) Army of the Upper Rhine	(France) Army of Sambre-et-Meuse (France) Army of Rhin-et-Moselle

Strength
175,000	187,000

In the Rhine campaign of 1795 (April 1795 to January 1796) during the War of the First Coalition, two Habsburg Austrian armies under the command of François Sébastien Charles Joseph de Croix, Count of Clerfayt, defeated two Republican French armies attempting to invade the south German states of the Holy Roman Empire. At the start of the campaign, the French Army of the Sambre and Meuse, led by Jean-Baptiste Jourdan, confronted Clerfayt's Army of the Lower Rhine in the north, while the French Army of the Rhine and Moselle, under Jean-Charles Pichegru, lay opposite Dagobert Sigmund von Wurmser's Army of the Upper Rhine in the south. A French offensive failed in early summer but in August, Jourdan crossed the Rhine and quickly seized Düsseldorf. The Army of the Sambre and Meuse advanced south to the Main River, isolating Mainz. Pichegru's army made a surprise capture of Mannheim and both French armies held significant footholds on the east bank of the Rhine.

The promising start to the French offensive ended when Pichegru lost an opportunity to seize Clerfayt's supply base in the Battle of Handschuhsheim. While Pichegru delayed, Clerfayt massed against Jourdan, beat him at the Battle of Höchst in October and forced most of the Army of the Sambre and Meuse to retreat to the west bank of the Rhine. At about the same time, Wurmser sealed off the French bridgehead at Mannheim. With Jourdan temporarily out of the picture, the Austrians defeated the left wing of the Army of the Rhine and Moselle at the Battle of Mainz and moved down the west bank. In November, Clerfayt defeated Pichegru at the Battle of Pfeddersheim and ended the Siege of Mannheim. In January 1796, Clerfayt concluded an armistice with the French, allowing the Austrians to retain large portions of the west bank. During the campaign, Pichegru entered into negotiations with French Royalists. It is debatable whether Pichegru's treason, his bad generalship or the unrealistic expectations of the war planners in Paris was the actual cause of the French failure.

== Background ==
The rulers of Europe initially viewed the French Revolution as an internal dispute between the French king Louis XVI and his subjects. As revolutionary rhetoric grew more strident, the monarchs of Europe declared their interests as one with those of Louis and his family. The Declaration of Pillnitz (27 August 1791) threatened ambiguous, serious consequences if anything should happen to the French royal family. With Habsburg, Prussian and British support, French émigrés continued to agitate for a counter-revolution. On 20 April 1792, the French National Convention declared war on the Habsburg monarchy, pushing Great Britain, the Kingdom of Portugal, the Ottoman Empire and the Holy Roman Empire into the War of the First Coalition (1792–1798).

After initial successes in 1792, French fortunes varied in 1793 and 1794. By 1794, the armies of the French Republic were in a state of disruption. Some of the old regime units, especially the cavalry, had defected en masse with Louis' brothers and cousins. Radicalization of the Revolution after 1793 encouraged the suspicion of treason in every loss. The most radical of the revolutionaries purged the military of all men conceivably loyal to the Ancien Régime (Old Regime), resulting in the loss of experienced leadership and non-commissioned officers. To fill the ranks of the army, a levée en masse (mass conscription) created a new kind of army with thousands of illiterate, untrained men under the command of officers whose principal qualifications may have been their loyalty to the Revolution instead their military acumen. The formation of new demi-brigades merged the old military units with new revolutionary formations: each demi-brigade included one unit of the old royal army and two created from the mass conscription. The French Directory believed that war should pay for itself and did not budget to pay, feed or equip its troops, leaving them to scavenge for their needs from the villages and towns where they were stationed. By early 1795, this newly structured and expanded army had made itself odious throughout France through its rapacious dependence upon the countryside for material support, its general lawlessness, and its undisciplined behavior.

=== Political conditions ===
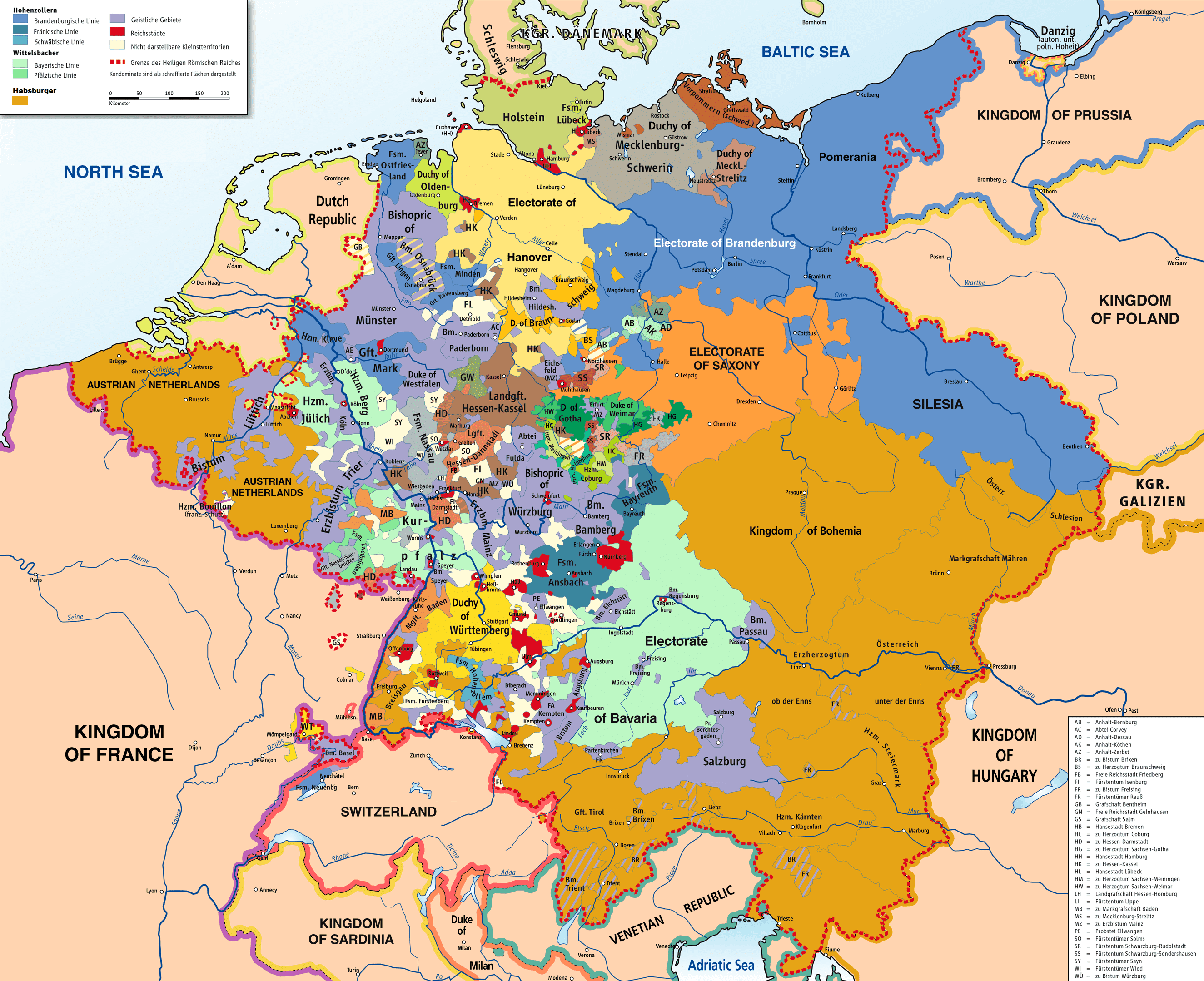
The plethora of states of the Holy Roman Empire was especially dense on the east bank of the Rhine.

The predominantly German-speaking states on the east bank of the Rhine were part of the vast complex of territories in central Europe of the Holy Roman Empire, of which the Archduchy of Austria was a principal polity; the imperial electors typically selected the archduke as the Holy Roman Emperor. The French government considered the Holy Roman Empire as its principal continental enemy. The territories of the Empire in 1795 included more than 1,000 entities, including the (Habsburg) Breisgau that bordered on the Rhine, Offenburg and Rottweil (free cities), the territories belonging to the princely families of Fürstenberg and Hohenzollern, the duchies of Baden and Württemberg plus several dozen ecclesiastic polities. Much of the territory of these polities was not contiguous: a village could belong predominantly to one polity but have a farmstead, a house or one or two strips of land that belonged to another polity. The size and influence of the polities varied, from the Kleinstaaterei, the little states that covered no more than a few square miles or included several non-contiguous pieces, to such sizeable territories as the Duchy of Bavaria and the Kingdom of Prussia. The governance of these states also varied; they included the autonomous free Imperial cities (also of different sizes and influence), ecclesiastical territories and such influential dynastic states as Prussia. Through the organization of ten Imperial circles, also called Reichskreise, groups of states consolidated resources and promoted regional, religious, and organizational interests, including economic cooperation and military protection. (Note: Beginning in the sixteenth century, the ten "circles" (Kreise) or regional groups of ecclesiastical, dynastic and secular polities coordinated economic, military and political actions. During times of war, the circles contributed troops to the Habsburg military by drafting (or soliciting volunteers) among their inhabitants. Some circles coordinated their efforts better than others; the Swabian Circle was among the more effective of the Imperial circles at organizing itself and protecting its economic interests. This structure is explained in more detail in James Allen Vann, The Swabian Kreis: Institutional Growth in the Holy Roman Empire 1648–1715. Vol. LII, Studies Presented to International Commission for the History of Representative and Parliamentary Institutions. Bruxelles, 1975 and Mack Walker, German Home Towns: Community, State, and General Estate, 1648–1871. Ithaca, Cornell, 1998.)

=== Geography ===
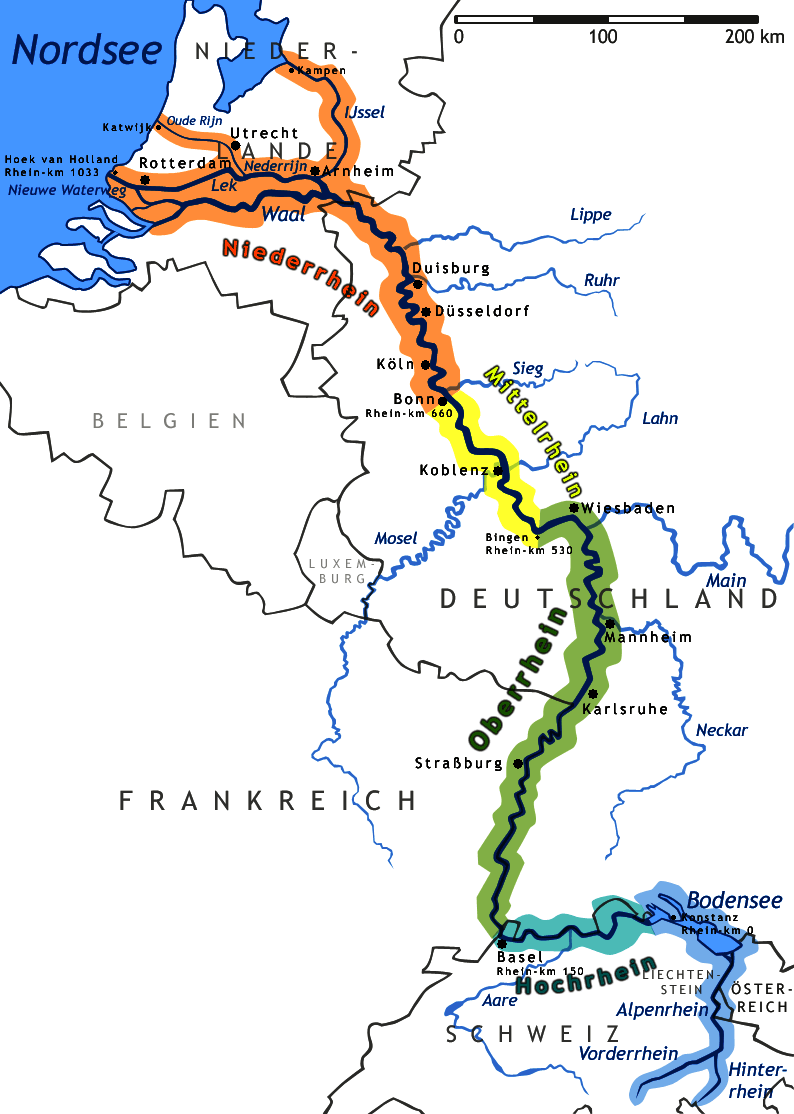
Map of river Rhine shows Düsseldorf and the rivers Sieg and Lahn in the north, Strasbourg and Mannheim in the south. Both sides of the conflict viewed the Rhine as the main geographic asset, the natural border between the combatants. The state that controlled the Rhine crossings controlled access to the other state.

The Rhine formed the boundary between the German states of the Holy Roman Empire and its neighbors, principally France but also Switzerland and the Netherlands. Any attack by either party required control of the crossings. (Note: The river began in the Swiss canton of Graubünden (also called the Grisons) near Lake Toma and flowed along the Alpine region bordered by Liechtenstein, northward into Lake Constance. The river left the lake by Reichenau; at Stein am Rhein the river dropped 23 meters (75 ft) in an unnavigable waterfall and flowed westerly along the border between the German states and the Swiss cantons. The c. 150-kilometer (93 mi) stretch between Stein am Rhein and Basel, called the High Rhine, cut through steep hillsides only near the Rhine Falls and flowed over a gravel bed; in such places as the former rapids at Laufenburg or after the confluence with the even larger Aare below Koblenz, Switzerland, it moved in torrents.) At Basel, where the river makes a wide, northerly turn at the Rhine knee, it enters what the locals called the Rhine Ditch (Rheingraben). This forms part of a rift valley some 31 km (19 mi) wide, bordered by the mountainous Black Forest on the east (German side) and the Vosges mountains on the west (French side). At the far edges of the eastern flood plain, tributaries cut deep defiles into the western slope of the mountains. Further to the north, the river became deeper and faster as it passed through the mountainous and hilly terrain of the Upper and Middle Rhine; the river abruptly turned between Wiesbaden and Bingen am Rhein, and it widened as it approached Bonn and Cologne. As the river passed Düsseldorf and Duisburg, the Rhine divided into several channels in the Netherlands, formed a delta, and emptied into the North Sea.

In the 1790s, the river was wild and unpredictable and armies crossed at their peril. Between the Rhine Knee and Mannheim, channels wound through marsh and meadow and created islands of trees and vegetation that were periodically submerged by floods. Flash floods originating in the mountains could deluge farms and fields. Any army wishing to traverse the river had to cross at specific points and, in 1790, complex systems of viaducts and causeways made access across the river reliable only at Kehl, by Strasburg, at Hüningen, by Basel and in the north by Mannheim. Sometimes a crossing could be executed at Neuf-Brisach, between Kehl and Hüningen, but the small bridgehead made this unreliable for an army of any size. (Note: The Rhine itself looked different in the 1790s than it does in the twenty-first century; in the nineteenth century, the passage from Basel to Iffezheim was "corrected" (straightened) to make year-round transport easier. Between 1927 and 1975, the construction of a canal allowed better control of the water level.) Only to the north of Kaiserslauten did the river acquire a defined bank where fortified bridges offered reliable crossing points.

By 1794–1795, civilian military planners in Paris considered the upper Rhine Valley, the south-western German territories and the Danube river basin of strategic importance for the defense of the Republic. At the border closest to France, the Rhine offered a formidable barrier to what the French perceived as Austrian aggression and the state that controlled its crossings controlled access into the territories on either side. Ready access across the Rhine and along the Rhine bank between the German states and Switzerland or through the Black Forest, gave access to the upper Danube river valley. For the French, the more German territory they could control, the safer they felt and control of the crossings meant control from the east (German) side of the river.

== Plans for 1795 ==
Parisian revolutionaries and military commanders alike believed that an assault into the German states was essential. Not only in terms of war aims but also in practical terms, the Directory believed that war should pay for itself and did not budget for the payment or feeding of its troops. To further their goals for France's security, the war planners in Paris reorganized the army into task forces. The left flank of the Armée du Centre (Army of the Center) later the called the Armée de Moselle (Army of the Moselle), the right wing of the Armée du Nord (Army of the North) and the entireArmée des Ardennes (Army of the Ardennes) were combined to form the Army of the Sambre and Meuse. The remaining units of the former Army of the Center and the Armée du Rhin (Army of the Rhine) were united, initially on 29 November 1794 and formally on 20 April 1795, as the Army of the Rhine and Moselle under the command of Jean-Charles Pichegru.

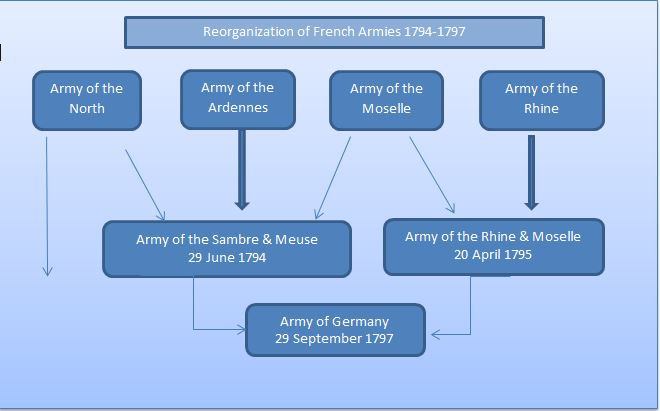
The two principal French Armies of 1794 were formed from four smaller units, each contributing a portion of its troops to either the Sambre and Meuse or the Army of the Rhine and Moselle. The right flank of Army of the North remained in the Netherlands.

Theirs was an army entirely dependent for support upon the countryside it occupied and it was imperative to get the armies out of France and into German territories as soon as possible. Although this solved some of the problems of feeding the army, by shifting the responsibility to the occupied territories, it did not solve them all. The behavior that had made the troops unpopular in the French countryside and towns made them even more unpopular in the Rhineland. Soldiers were paid in paper currency called the assignat, which the local inhabitants did not want, for lodging, food and general purchases; it eventually became worthless. After April 1796, pay was made in metallic currency; even then, though, pay was generally in arrears. (Note: Throughout the spring and early summer of 1796, the soldiers were in almost constant mutiny: in May 1796, in the border town of Zweibrücken, a demi-brigade revolted. In June, pay for two demi-brigades was in arrears and two companies rebelled.)

== Campaign of 1795 ==
The Rhine Campaign of 1795 (April 1795 to January 1796) opened when two Habsburg armies under the overall command of François Sébastien Charles Joseph de Croix, Count of Clerfayt, thwarted an attempt by two French armies to cross the Rhine River and capture the Fortress of Mainz. The French Army of the Sambre and Meuse, commanded by Jean-Baptiste Jourdan, confronted Clerfayt's Army of the Lower Rhine in the north, while the French Army of Rhine and Moselle under the command of Pichegru lay opposite Dagobert Sigmund von Wurmser's Army of the Upper Rhine in the south.

In August, Jourdan crossed and quickly seized Düsseldorf. The Army of the Sambre and Meuse advanced south to the Main River, isolating Mainz. On 20 September 1795, 30,000 French troops under the command of Jourdan laid siege to Mainz. The Coalition garrison of 9,600 negotiated secretly with the French to relinquish the fortress. The French subsequently used the city as a staging area for much of the 1795 campaign.

With late summer successes at Düsseldorf and Mainz, the French armies held significant footholds on the east bank of the Rhine. The promising advance eastward into the German states faltered. Pichegru missed at least one opportunity to seize Clerfayt's supply base in the Battle of Handschuhsheim. He had sent two divisions commanded by Georges Joseph Dufour to seize the Coalition supply base near Heidelberg, but his troops were attacked at Handshuhsheim, a Heidelberg suburb. The Austrian cavalry, under the command of Johann von Klenau, included six squadrons each of the Hohenzollern Cuirassier Regiment Nr. 4 and Szekler Hussar Regiment Nr. 44, four squadrons of the Allemand Dragoon Regiment, an Émigré unit and three squadrons of the Royal Dragoon Regiment Nr. 3. Klenau's horsemen charged Dufour's troops as they moved through open country. The Austrians first routed six squadrons of French chasseurs à cheval, then turned their attention to the foot soldiers. Dufour's division was cut to pieces and the general was captured.

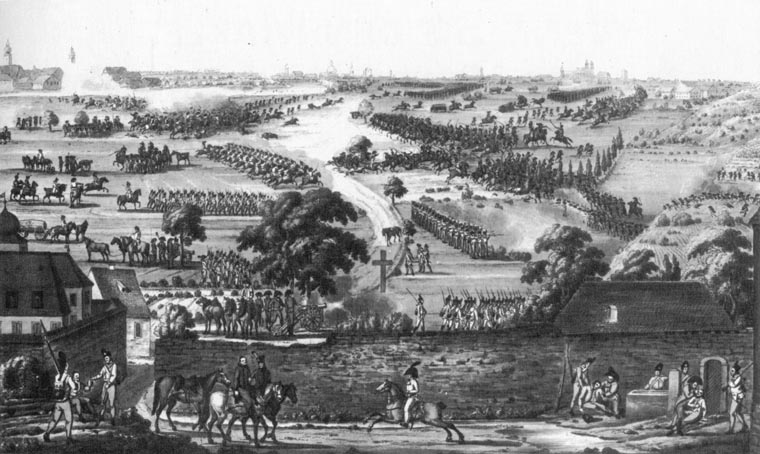
The Battle of Handschuhsheim, outside of Heidelberg, marked the turning point of the campaign against the French.

Clerfayt massed his troops against Jourdan, beat him at the Battle of Höchst in October, and forced most of the Army of the Sambre and Meuse to retreat to the west bank of the Rhine. Wurmser turned his attention to Mannheim. With Jourdan temporarily quiescent, his 17,000 Coalition troops engaged Pichigru's 12,000 French soldiers encamped outside the Mannheim fortress. Wurmser drove them from their encampment; they either retreated into the city of Mannheim or fled to other forces in the region. Wurmser then laid siege to the French troops that had sought safety inside the city walls. While Wurmser besieged Mannheim, at Mainz, a Coalition army of 27,000, led by Clerfayt, launched a surprise assault on 29 October 1795 against four divisions (33,000 men) of the French Army of the Rhine and Moselle commanded by François Ignace Schaal at the battle of Mainz. The French division on the farthest right flank fled the battlefield, compelling the other three divisions to retreat with the loss of their siege artillery and many casualties.

On 10 November 1795, Clerfayt defeated Pichegru at the Battle of Pfeddersheim. The French continued to withdraw. Clerfayt advanced with 75,000 Coalition troops south along the west bank of the Rhine against Pichegru's 37,000-man strong defenses behind the Pfrimm River near Worms. At the Battle of Frankenthal (13–14 November 1795), an Austrian victory forced Pichegru to abandon his last defensive position north of Mannheim. Once the French troops at Pfeddersheim abandoned their position, the French position at Mannheim, invested by the Coalition since October, became untenable. On 22 November 1795, after a one-month siege, Anne Charles Basset Montaigu's 10,000-strong French garrison surrendered. This event brought the 1795 campaign in Germany to an end.

== Subsequent plans and lessons learned ==
In January 1796, Clerfayt concluded an armistice with the French. The Austrians retained large portions of the west bank. Despite the armistice, both sides continued to plan for war. In a decree on 6 January 1796, Lazare Carnot, one of the five French directors, again gave Germany priority over Italy as a theater of war. The French First Republic's finances were in poor shape, so its armies would be expected to invade new territories and then live off the conquered lands, as they had been instructed to do in 1795. Knowing that the French planned to invade Germany, on 20 May 1796 the Austrians announced that the truce would end on 31 May, and prepared for war.

Of the lessons learned in both 1794 and 1795, as Gunther E. Rothenberg speculated, the Habsburgs may have concluded they could not rely on their allies. For example, in its prompt capitulation of Mannheim, the Bavarian garrison had surrendered all supplies, horses, armaments and weaponry, an action that seemingly confirmed to the Habsburg commanders that their allies were not reliable. By 1795, the Habsburg forces were better prepared to make war alone, placing Wurmser and Clerfayt, both experienced commanders, in charge of their own independent corps. After 1795, they had clearly learned more lessons. Consolidating forces where possible along the Rhine, the Habsburg military prepared for 1796 by mobilizing the imperial contingents into their own army: this meant drafting raw recruits from the ten imperial circles; Charles was authorized to act as he saw fit and given overall command of the army. Eventually, Wurmser was transferred to northern Italy to address the threat Napoleon posed to the southern border of the Austrian lands, leaving Charles on his own. Even with his force augmented by imperial recruits, in the spring of 1796 Charles had an army half the size of the French, covering a 340-kilometer (211 mi) front that stretched from Switzerland to the North Sea in what Gunther Rothenberg called the "thin white line". (Note: Habsburg infantry wore white coats.) Imperial troops could not cover the territory from Basel to Frankfurt in sufficient depth to resist the pressure of their opponents.

== School for Marshals ==
Historians generally accept the French results of the Campaign of 1795 as an unmitigated disaster. The poor showing of the French may have been linked to Pichegru's possible treacherous behavior. By 1795, Pichegru was leaning heavily toward the Royalist cause: he accepted money from a British agent William Wickham and was in contact with individuals who wished for a return of the French monarchy. The Directory left him in command of the Army of the Rhine and Moselle until March 1796, when he resigned. He returned to Paris, where he was greeted with great acclaim by the populace. His replacement in army command was General of Division Jean Victor Marie Moreau. Historians still debate if Pichegru's treason, his bad generalship, or the unrealistic expectations set by the military planners in Paris were the actual cause of the French failure. Regardless, Ramsey Weston Phipps maintained,

To any one who believes with me that it is good to study bad as well as skilful [sic] campaigns and plans, the operations of 1795 are most interesting; for, while the actions of Jourdan, as far as he had a free hand, were sensible enough, those of Pichegru were like the nightmare of a professor of strategy, and the plans of the Comité [Directory] degenerated into sheer farce.

Even a poorly run campaign, offers lessons for the future. In the campaigns of 1795 and 1796, young officers acquired valuable experience for the future engagements in the Napoleonic Wars. Phipps emphasized the importance of experience under these trying conditions of manpower shortage, poor training, minimal equipment, supply shortage, tactical and strategic confusion, and interference from the Directory in his five volume analysis of the Revolutionary Armies. The training received in the early years of the war varied not only with the theater in which the young officers served but also with the character of the army to which they belonged. The experience of young officers under the tutelage of such experienced men as Soult, Moreau, Lazare Hoche, Lefebvre, and Jourdan provided them with valuable lessons.

Phipps' analysis was not singular, although his lengthy volumes addressed in detail the value of this so-called "School for Marshals". In 1895, Richard Dunn Pattison also singled out the French Revolutionary War Rhine campaigns as "the finest school the world has yet seen for an apprenticeship in the trade of arms". In 1795, Pichegru remained inactive for the better part of August, subsequently losing any opportunity to acquire the Habsburg supply depot outside Heidelberg. Phipps speculated on why Moreau gained renown by the supposed skill of his 1796 retreat and suggested that it was not skillful for Moreau to allow the inferior columns of Latour, Nauendorf and Fröhlich to herd him back to France. Even during Moreau's advance, Phipps maintained, the commander was not only irresolute but seemed to have an unwarranted faith in Pichegru's abilities and resolve. Soult, who participated in the campaign as an infantry brigadier, noted that although Jourdan made many errors, the French government's errors were worse. Principally, the French were unable to pay for supplies because their currency was worthless, so the soldiers stole everything they needed. This ruined discipline and turned the local populations against the French.

Emperor Napoleon I also recognized this when he resurrected the ancien regime civil dignity of the marchalate to strengthen his power. He rewarded the most valuable of his generals and soldiers who had held significant commands during the French Revolutionary Wars. The Army of the Rhine and Moselle (and its subsequent incarnations) included several future Marshals of France: Jean-Baptiste Jourdan, its commander-in-chief, Jean-Baptiste Drouet, Laurent de Gouvion Saint-Cyr and Édouard Adolphe Casimir Joseph Mortier. François Joseph Lefebvre, an old man by 1804, was named an honorary marshal but not awarded a field position. Michel Ney, in the 1795–1799 campaigns an intrepid cavalry commander, came into his own command under the tutelage of Moreau and André Masséna in the south German and Swiss campaigns. Jean de Dieu Soult, who served under Moreau and Massena, becoming the latter's right-hand man during the France's invasion of Switzerland in 1798 and the Swiss campaign of 1799–1800. Jean Baptiste Bessieres, like Ney, was a competent and sometimes inspired regimental commander in 1796. MacDonald, Oudinot and Saint-Cyr, participants in the subsequent 1796 campaign, all received honors in the third, fourth and fifth promotions (1809, 1811, 1812).

== Notes, citations and sources ==
=== Sources ===
- Bertaud, Jean Paul (1988). The Army of the French Revolution: From Citizen-Soldiers to Instrument of Power. Translated by Palmer, R. R. Princeton: Princeton University Press. OCLC 17954374.
- Blanning, Timothy (1998). The French Revolutionary Wars. New York: Oxford University Press. ISBN 978-0-34056-911-5.
- Dodge, T. A. (2011). Warfare in the Age of Napoleon: The Revolutionary Wars Against the First Coalition in Northern Europe and the Italian Campaign, 1789–1797. USA: Leonaur. ISBN 978-0-85706-598-8.
- Dunn-Pattison, R. (1977) [1897]. Napoleon's Marshals. Wakefield: EP Pub. OCLC 3438894.
- Ersch, Johann Samuel (1889). Allgemeine encyclopädie der wissenschaften und künste in alphabetischer folge von genannten schrifts bearbeitet und herausgeben (in German). Leipzig: J. F. Gleditsch. pp. 64–66. OCLC 978611925.
- Gates, David (2011). The Napoleonic Wars 1803–1815. New York: Random House. ISBN 978-0-71260-719-3.
- Graham, Thomas, 1st Baron Lynedoch. (1797) The History of the Campaign of 1796 in Germany and Italy. London, (np). OCLC 44868000
- Hansard, Thomas C., ed. (1803). Hansard's Parliamentary Debates, House of Commons, 1803, Official Report. Vol. I. London: HMSO. OCLC 85790018.
- Knepper, Thomas P. (2006). The Rhine. Handbook for Environmental Chemistry Series, Part L. New York: Springer. ISBN 978-3-54029-393-4
- McLynn, Frank (2002). Napoleon: A Biography. New York, Arcade Pub. OCLC 49351026
- Phipps, R. W. (2011). The Armies of the First French Republic: The Armées du Moselle, du Rhin, de Sambre-et-Meuse, de Rhin-et-Moselle. Vol. II. USA: Pickle Partners. ISBN 978-1-90869-225-2.
- Rothenberg, Gunther E. (Feb 1973). "The Habsburg Army in the Napoleonic Wars (1792–1815)". Military Affairs, 37:1, pp. 1–5. ISSN 0026-3931
- Rothenberg, Gunther E. (2007). Napoleon's Great Adversaries: Archduke Charles and the Austrian Army, 1792–1914. Gloucester: Spellmount. ISBN 978-1-86227-383-2.
- Smith, Digby (1998). The Napoleonic Wars Data Book. London: Greenhill. ISBN 978-1-8536-7276-7.
- Vann, James Allen (1975). The Swabian Kreis: Institutional Growth in the Holy Roman Empire 1648–1715. Vol. LII. Brussels: Studies Presented to International Commission for the History of Representative and Parliamentary Institutions. OCLC 923507312.
- Volk, Helmut (2006). "Landschaftsgeschichte und Natürlichkeit der Baumarten in der Rheinaue". Waldschutzgebiete Baden-Württemberg (in German). X: 159–167. OCLC 939802377.
- Walker, Mack (1998). German Home Towns: Community, State and General Estate, 1648–1871. Ithaca, N. Y.: Cornell University Press. OCLC 2276157.
- Whaley, Joachim (2012). Germany and the Holy Roman Empire: Maximilian I to the Peace of Westphalia, 1493–1648. Vol. I. Oxford: Oxford University Press. ISBN 978-0-19968-882-1.

==== Additional resources ====
- Rickard, J. (2009). "Combat of Frankenthal, 13–14 November 1795". historyofwar.org.
- Rickard, J. (2009). "Combat of Heidelberg, 23–25 September 1795". historyofwar.org.
- Rickard, J. (2009). "Combat of the Pfrimm, 10 November 1795". historyofwar.org.
- Rickard, J. (2009). "Battle of Höchst, 11 October 1795". historyofwar.org.
- Rickard, J. (2009). "Siege of Mannheim, 10 October – 22 November 1795". historyofwar.org.
