= Get Well Soon (band) =

German band and musical project

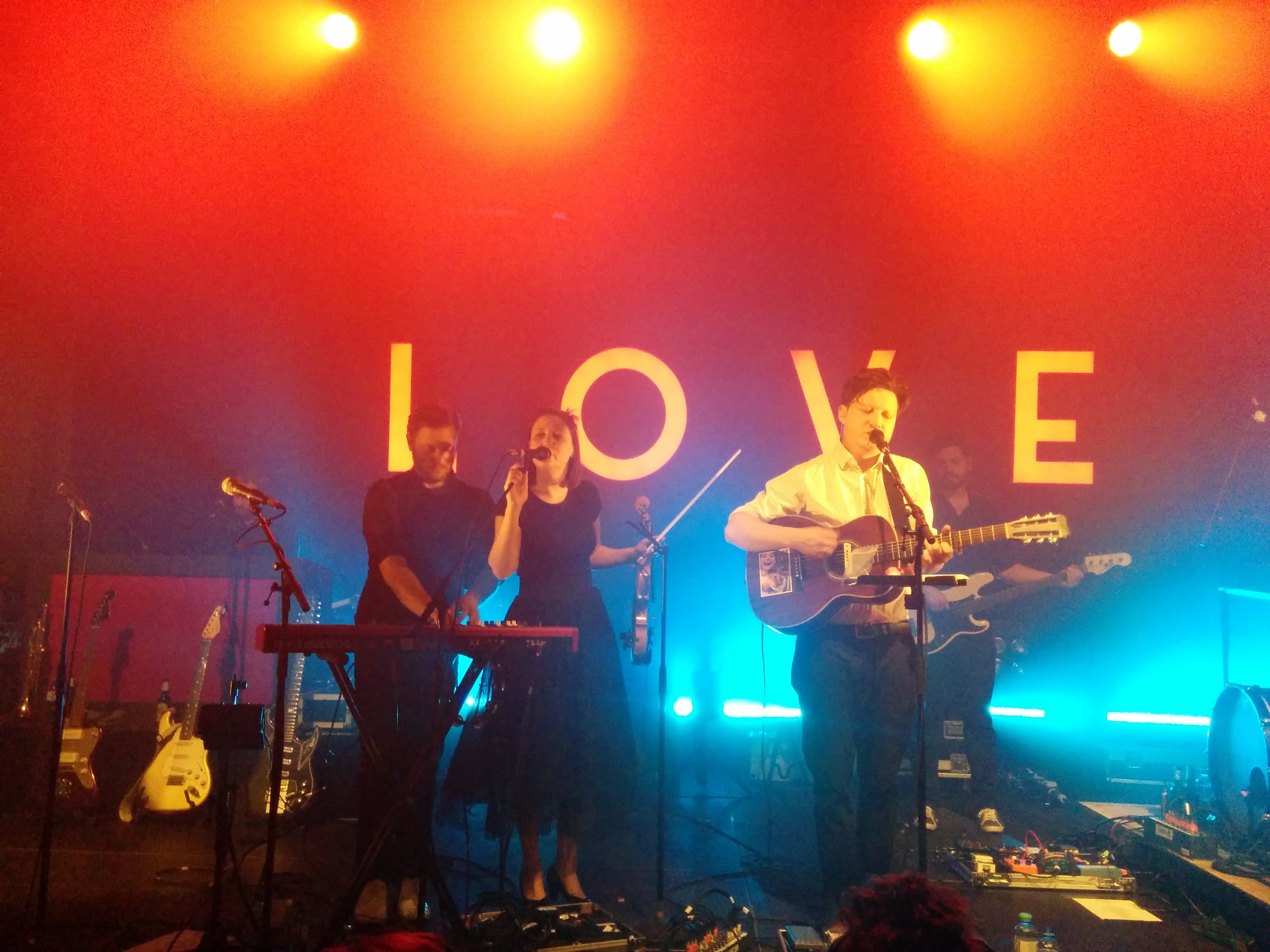

Background information
- Origin: Germany
- Genres: Indie rock, folk rock, progressive rock
- Years active: 2005–present
- Label: City Slang
- Members: Konstantin Gropper

Get Well Soon is a music and band project of the German singer, songwriter and instrumentalist Konstantin Gropper. He has released six albums and a number of EPs and singles.

== Career ==
Gropper was born September 28, 1982, in Biberach an der Riss, Germany, the son of Walter Gropper, a music teacher in Erolzheim. He grew up in a musical household and learned to play the cello at an early age while he attended the gymnasium in Ochsenhausen. At secondary school he formed his first band, Your Garden and briefly studied languages at the Heidelberg University before enrolling at the Mannheim Pop Academy. His sister Verena is a soprano and they occasionally perform together.

He worked 3 years on his debut album Rest Now, Weary Head! You Will Get Well Soon which was released in Europe by the Label City Slang and by Nude Records in the UK and Ireland in January 2008. The album entered the German Album Charts on no. 28 and also entered the French, Austrian and Swiss charts. Gropper formed a live band and toured the album. In 2008 Gropper also wrote exclusive tracks for the latest Wim Wenders movie Palermo Shooting, alongside other artists like Portishead and Nick Cave.

The second album Vexations was released in Europe in January 2010. Unlike the debut, it was pre-produced by Konstantin Gropper and then was recorded with a full band in a studio. It entered the German album charts at number 11 and was followed by a tour.

In 2011 Konstantin Gropper wrote the score to the first season of the French series Xanadu, which was broadcast in France and Germany by ARTE TV.

In 2012 he released the album The Scarlet Beast O'Seven Heads. In 2016 he released an orchestral version of the 2010 album as Vexations 16.

== Discography ==
EPs

- A Secret Cave, A Swan (2005)
- My Tiny Christmas Tragedy (2005)
- Glaciers, Kisses, Apples, Nuts (2006)
- All That Keeps Us From Giving In (2007)
- Songs Against The Glaciation (2008)
- Listen! Those Lost at Sea Sing a Song on Christmas Day“ (4-Track-CD-R) (Nude Records 2008)
- Get Well Soon and The Grand Ensemble. Live at the Konzerthaus Dortmund (Download-EP) (2010)
- The Lufthansa Heist (2014)
- Henry – The Infinite Desire of Heinrich Zeppelin Alfred von Nullmeyer (2014)
- Greatest Hits (2014)
- Born with Too Much Love (2016)

Albums

- Rest Now, Weary Head! You Will Get Well Soon (2008) (GER: #28; FR: #92)
- Vexations (2010) (GER: #11; FR: #81)
- The Scarlet Beast O'Seven Heads (2012)
- Love (2016)
- Vexations 16 (2016)
- The Horror (2018)
- Amen (2022)
- Minus the Magic (2026)

Singles

- "If This Hat Is Missing I Have Gone Hunting" (2008)
- "Witches, Witches! Rest Now In The Fire" (2008)
