= Richard Dunn Pattison =

Richard Phillipson Dunn Pattison (1874 – 8 March 1916) was a British soldier and academic historian specialising in military history.

== Biography ==
Dunn Pattison was the son of Alexander Dunn Pattison, who was an advocate of Old Kilpatrick, Dumbarton, and his wife Minnie Phillipson. He served with the 91st Argyll and Sutherland Highlanders.

After studies at New College, Oxford, where in 1901 he took a first class in the Final History School, he was, in late 1902, elected a lecturer in history at Magdalen College, Oxford. He was a later a Fellow of the college, and became Professor of History at Oxford University.

He became distinguished military historian and after publishing War in 1904, followed it up with Napoleon's Marshals in 1909. This classic work, containing detailed biographical sketches of the 24 Marshals of France appointed by Napoleon, was republished in 2007. His history of the Edward the Black Prince is a popular and scholarly biography, as is his history of the Argyll and Sutherland Highlanders.

Dunn Pattison served in World War I and was a captain in the 6th Battalion (Territorial), Devonshire Regiment. He was killed in action in Mesopotamia.

Dunn Pattison married Mary Winifred Wilkes who was at Girton College. She was the daughter of Rev. Alpheus Wilkes and sister of Paget Wilkes, whose biography she wrote. The couple had two daughters.

== Publications ==
- Napoleon's Marshals, 1909 Methuen, Republished 2007 ISBN 978-1-4286-2926-4
- The Black Prince, 1910 Methuen
- The History of the 91st Argyllshire Highlanders, 1910 William Blackwood & Sons
- Figures in European History, 1912 Rivington's

== See also ==
- Clydebank
