= Erolzheim =

- Municipality
- Coat of arms

- Location of Erolzheim within Biberach district
- Interactive map of Erolzheim
- Location within Germany Location within Baden-Württemberg
- Coordinates: 48°5′28″N 10°4′19″E
- Country: Germany
- State: Baden-Württemberg
- Admin. region: Tübingen
- District: Biberach

Government
  - Mayor (2018–26): Jochen Ackermann

Area
  - Total: 26.31 km^{2} (10.16 sq mi)
- Elevation: 554 m (1,818 ft)

Population (2025-12-31)
  - Total: 3,377
  - Density: 128.4/km^{2} (332.4/sq mi)
- Time zone: UTC+01:00 (CET)
  - Summer (DST): UTC+02:00 (CEST)
- Postal codes: 88453
- Dialling codes: 07354
- Vehicle registration: BC
- Website: www.erolzheim.de

Erolzheim (German pronunciation: [ˈɛɐ̯ʁɔlt͡shaim]) is a town in the district of Biberach in Baden-Württemberg in Germany.

== Notables ==
- Willebold Held, imperial abbey of Rot an der Rot
- Karl Zenger (1838–1905), architect
- Erwin Biber (1905–1944), known as racer "Biberle"
- Johannes Hösle (1929–2017), romance studies and literary criticism scholar
- Max-Engelhardt von Kienlin (* 1934), farmer, forester, mountaineer and author
- Konstantin Maier (* 1949), Roman Catholic priest and church historian
- Stefan Speth (* 1971), movie art director, concept designer Blade Runner 2049, The Martian, The Hunger Games
- Konstantin Gropper (* 1982), director of the music project Get Well Soon
