= Trenck's Pandurs =

Unit of Habsburg light infantry, 1740s

- Trenck-Panduren
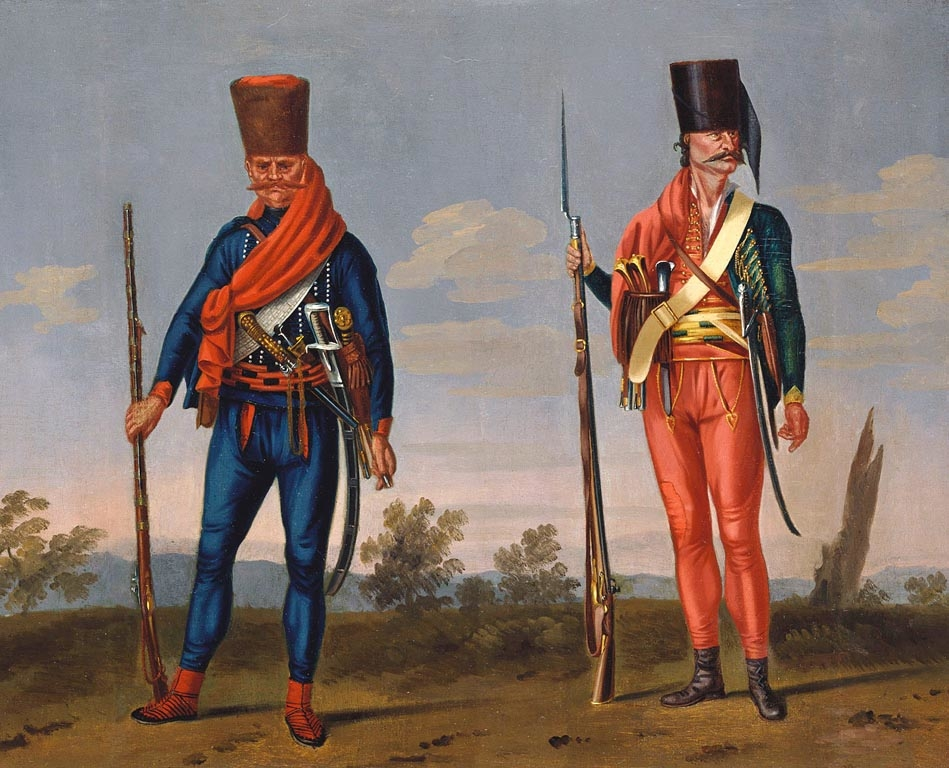
- c. 1748 painting of a soldier of Trenck's Pandurs (right)
- Active: 1741–1748
- Country: Habsburg monarchy
- Type: Infantry
- Role: Light infantry, skirmishers
- Size: 1,000 (1741)
- Motto: Vivat Pandur
- Engagements: War of the Austrian Succession; First and Second Silesian Wars

Commanders
- commandant: Trenck (1741–46)
- commandant (interim): obristlieutenant D'Olne (1747)
- commandant (interim): major Madrenas (1748)
- Notable commanders: Trenck

Trenck's Pandurs (German: Trenck-Panduren, Serbo-Croatian: Trenkovi panduri) were a light infantry unit of the Habsburg monarchy that was raised by Baron Franz von der Trenck under a charter issued by Maria Theresa of Austria in 1741. The unit was largely composed of volunteers from the Kingdom of Slavonia and Slavonian Military Frontier, and named after security guards otherwise employed to maintain public order. The Pandurs were presented to the empress in May 1741 with the unit's military band earning them a claim of pioneering martial music in Europe. The Pandurs did not use uniforms and had an overall Ottoman appearance. The original organization of the unit was retained until 1745, when it transformed into a regiment. Trenck was relieved of command in 1746 and imprisoned in Spielberg Castle, where he died in 1749. The unit ultimately transformed into the 53rd Infantry Regiment, headquartered in Zagreb, until it was disbanded in 1919. The regiment's commemorative medals bear Trenck's image wearing Pandur attire.

The Pandurs took part in the War of the Austrian Succession, including the Silesian Wars. They contributed to the capture or destruction of Zobten am Berge, Strehlen, Klaus Castle, Linz, Deggendorf, Diessenstein Castle, Cham, Cosel fortress, and Munich. During the Battle of Soor, the unit looted a Prussian war chest and the belongings of Frederick the Great. The Pandurs earned a reputation as brave, audacious, feared and ruthless soldiers, known for looting and pillaging. They were prone to disobedience, breaches of military discipline and stubbornness. The city of Waldmünchen, located near Cham, celebrates the Pandurs and Trenck as the city's saviors for sparing the city from destruction in 1742. The Pandurs' and Trenck's heritage is also preserved in the city of Požega, Croatia, where an eponymous living history troop and city music band exist.

== Etymology ==
The term pandur made its way into military use via the Hungarian language—being used in Hungarian as a loanword, in turn originating from the Croatian term pudar, though the nasal in place of the "u" suggests a borrowing before Croatian innovated its own reflex for Proto-Slavic /ɔ̃/. "Pudar" is still applied to security guards protecting crops in vineyards and fields, and it was coined from the verb puditi (also spelled pudati) meaning to chase or scare away. The meaning of the Hungarian loanword was expanded to guards in general, including law enforcement officers. The word was likely ultimately derived from medieval Latin banderius or bannerius, meaning either a guardian of fields or summoner, or follower of a banner.

Another etymology could recall the Ancient Greek expression pan with ther, meaning "great" or "all-beast", used in antiquity in the Latin word "Panther", often used to refer to occupying Roman soldiers and root of the German word Panzer itself.

By the middle of the 18th century, law enforcement in the counties of Croatia included county pandurs or hussars who patrolled roads and pursued criminals. In 1740, the term was applied to frontier guard duty infantry deployed in the Croatian Military Frontier (Banal Frontier), specifically its Karlovac and Varaždin Generalcies. The role of the pandurs as security guards was extended to Dalmatia after the establishment of Austrian rule there in the early 19th century. The term has dropped from official use for law enforcement officials, but it is still used colloquially in Serbo-Croatian in a manner akin to the English word cop. The unit raised and led by Trenck is also referred to more specifically as Trenck's Pandurs.

== History ==
Austrian obristwachtmeister Trenck had asked for the establishment of a Serbian militia (raizische Miliz), a freikorps (volunteer unit) numbering 1,000 troops, to be recruited in Slavonia and to be put under him to fight in Silesia. On 27 February 1741 a patent (decree) gave him permission to establish a regular Corps for supporting the Army in Silesia. The unit recruited from Slavonia (Kingdom of Slavonia and Slavonian Military Frontier) and Syrmia, from the Serb and Croat population. The unit was known as Trenck-Panduren and Panduren-Corps von der Trenck. With the 27 March 1745 patent the Corps was complemented a Regiment (20 ordinary, two grenadier companies).

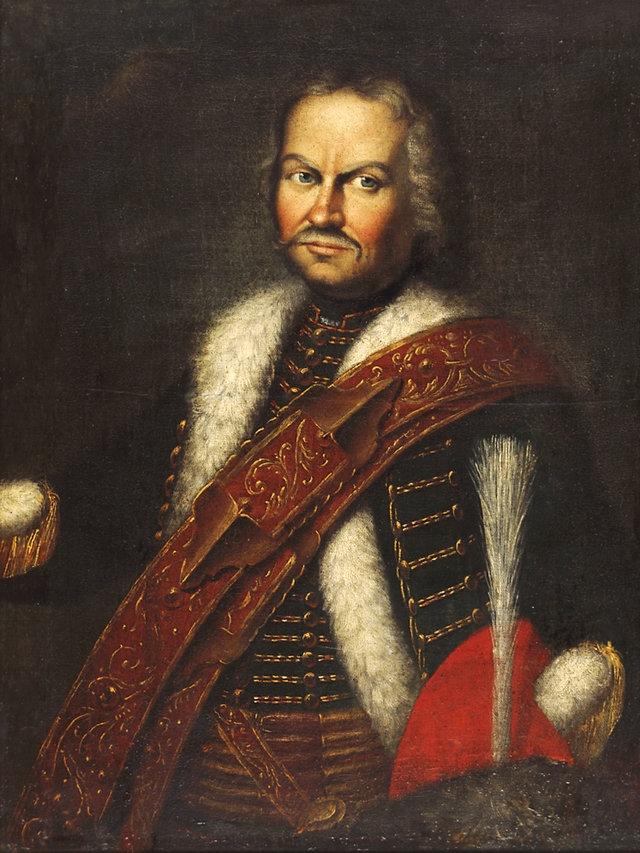
Baron Franz von der Trenck.

The Pandurs arrived in Vienna for a military parade for empress Maria Theresa on 27 May 1741. The unit was headed by Trenck and included two captains, a senior lieutenant, five lieutenants, a quartermaster, an adjutant, two chaplains (a Catholic and an Orthodox Christian), two medics, forty sergeants, five scribes, eighty corporals, and twelve musicians equipped with flutes, a drum and cymbals. The musicians were called the Turkish band, after Ottoman military bands, and are considered pioneers of martial music in Europe according to Jurica Miletić. The Pandurs did not have specific uniforms as their clothes varied but were of Turkish style. Their oriental appearance was compounded by mandatory head shaving, leaving a rattail, as well as by the use of a horse tail bunchuk instead of a unit banner. Each Pandur carried four single-shot pistols, a fighting knife, and a small utilitarian knife.

The Pandurs saw military action in Silesia, Bohemia, Bavaria, and France. The Pandurs took part in War of the Austrian Succession, including the First Silesian War. In 1741 the unit was sent to the Silesian war theatre, and participated in the attack at Zobten, with successful operations. They then captured Strehlen in Lower Silesia from the Prussians, and defended a bridgehead near Vienna after the Battle of Mollwitz. In 1742, the Pandurs took part in capture of Klaus Castle in Styria as well as Linz and Deggendorf, where they defeated French troops before taking part in Austrian recapture of Munich. By the end of that year, the Pandurs had captured Diessenstein Castle and Cham from Bavarian defenders, completely destroying Cham to secure access for Habsburg troops led by Ludwig Andreas von Khevenhüller to Bohemia. In 1743, the Pandurs led by Trenck captured Cosel fortress. In 1745, during the Second Silesian War, the Pandurs took part in the Battle of Soor, where they looted a Prussian war chest containing 80,000 ducats, as well as weapons, horses and a tent belonging to Frederick the Great.

The Pandurs earned a reputation for being brave and audacious, as well as feared and ruthless soldiers, looting and pillaging, but also characterized by disobedience, breaches of military discipline and stubbornness.

Trenck was relieved of command in 1746 and tried for unspecified "acts of violence", with imprisonment in Spielberg Castle where he died in 1749. In 1748 the Pandur-Corps was reduced to a battalion, with four fusilier- and one grenadier company, and was called the Slavonisches Panduren-Bataillon. This unit was then transformed into the infantry "Linien-Infanteri-Regiment" in 1756, which later received the number 53rd. Despite having ended its Pandur history, that regiment kept its Pandur lineage alive through its commemorative medals bearing Trenck's image wearing Pandur attire, until its disbandment as the 53rd Zagreb infantry regiment in January 1919.

== Legacy ==
The achievements of the Pandurs led by Trenck left a lasting mark on the culture and heritage of Croatia as well as Bavaria. An example of the unit's legacy is found in the village of Trenkovo—named after the commander of the Pandurs in 1912. The village is located in area of Trenck's former Velika estate, near Požega, Croatia, where the baron lived. It was the location of a baroque manor once owned by Trenck, which was replaced by another structure in the late 18th or early 19th centuries. Pandur heritage is preserved by the Trenck's Pandurs (Croatian: Trenkovi panduri) military band—the official music band of the city of Požega—established on 28 January 1881. In 1997, an eponymous living history troop was established out of members of the band.

The city of Waldmünchen near Cham celebrates Trenck's Pandurs as their saviors for sparing the city from destruction in 1742, with an annual festival called the "Trenckfestspiele". Since 1950, the city organizes a historical reenactment of the event involving about 300 actors.

The military unit and its leader also give their names to a modern armed force unit and modern military equipment. Special police platoon Trenk, formed in Požega on 8 March 1991, took part in the Croatian War of Independence. Austrian Steyr-Daimler-Puch produced the Pandur armoured fighting vehicle.

Legacy

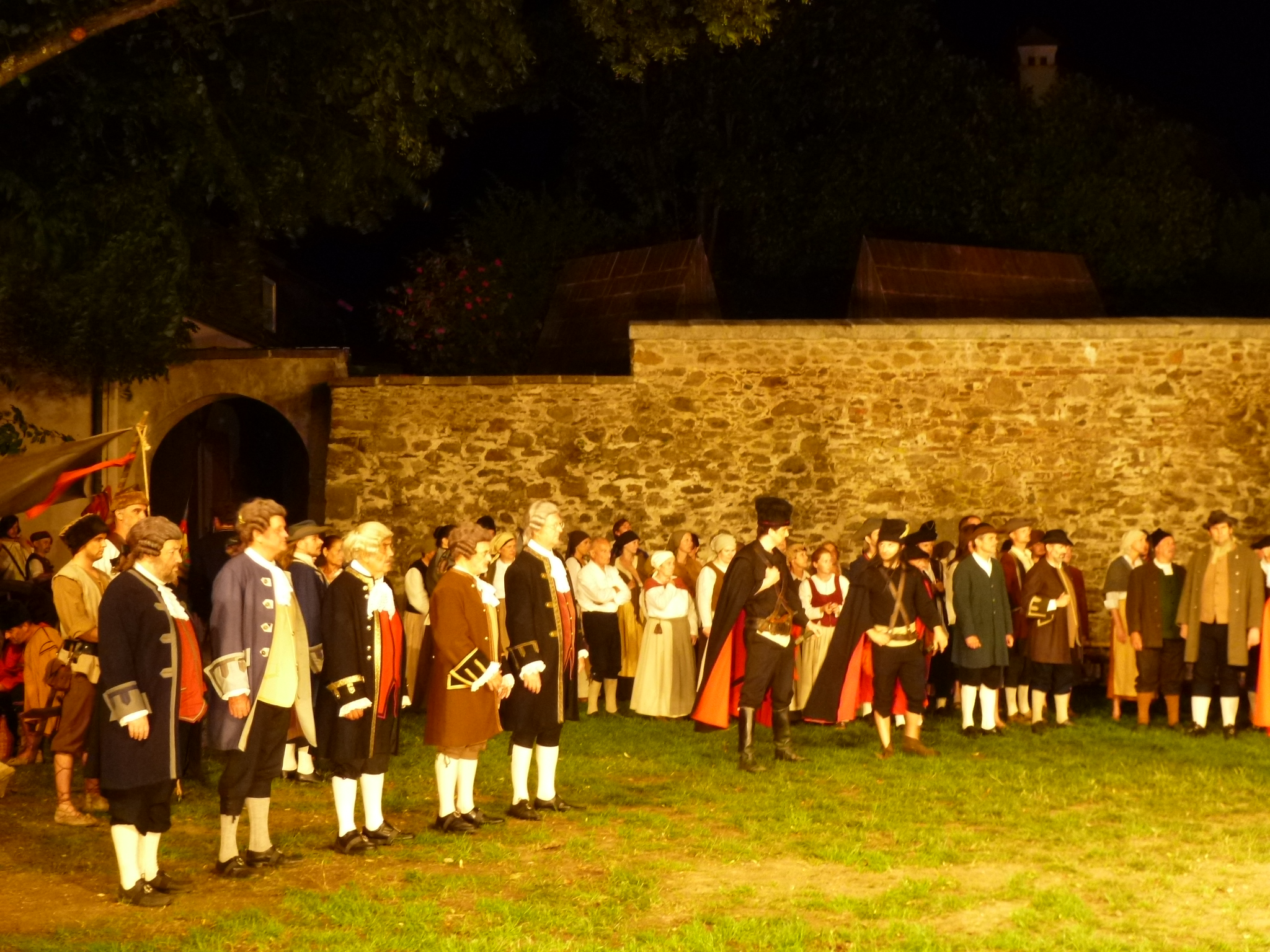
Festival at Waldmünchen

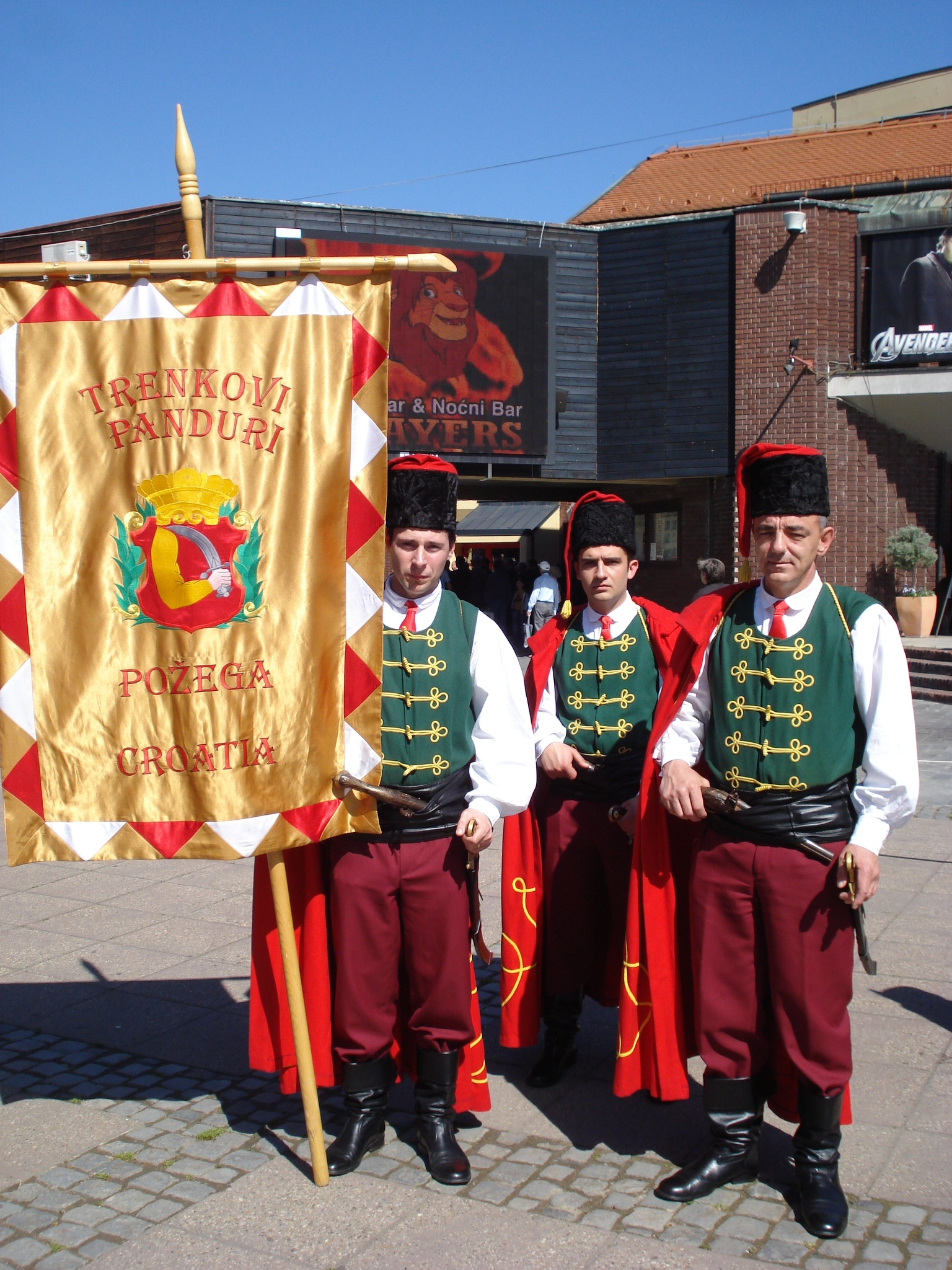
Living history troop from Požega.

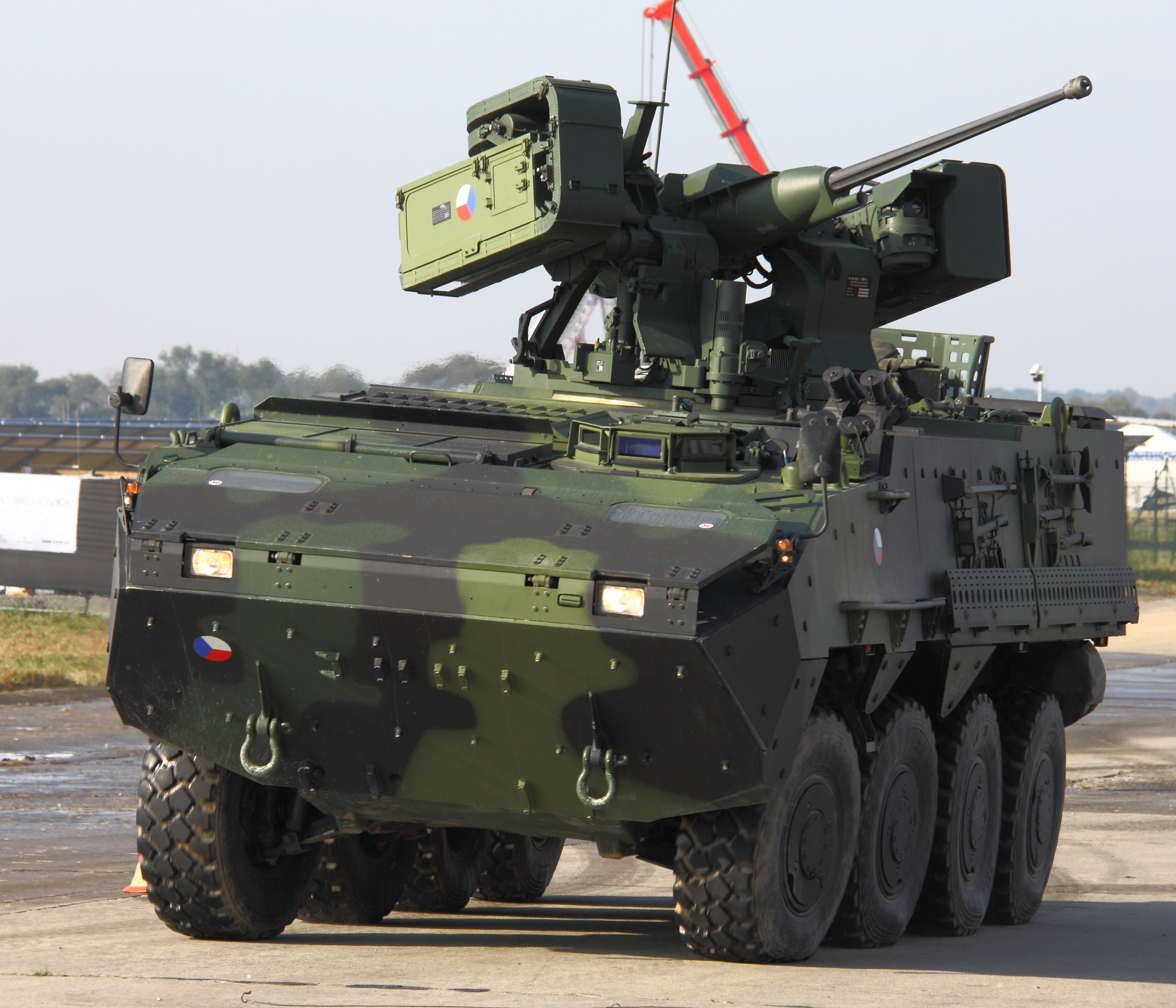
Austrian-made Pandur II infantry fighting vehicle of Austria.

== See also ==
- Tudor Vladimirescu—commanded a pandur militia in the Wallachian uprising of 1821
- Seressaner
- Pandur
- Hajduk
- Uskok
- Grenz infantry
- Serbian revolution

== Sources ==
- Miletić, Jurica (2006a). "Trenkovi panduri (I. dio): U službi Marije Terezije" [In service of Maria Theresa]. Hrvatski vojnik (in Croatian). Ministry of Defence (Croatia). Archived from the original on 10 February 2012.
- Miletić, Jurica (2006b). "Trenkovi panduri (II. dio): Od počasti do propasti" [From glory to defeat]. Hrvatski vojnik (in Croatian). Ministry of Defence (Croatia). Archived from the original on 22 February 2008.
- Vaníček, Fr (1875). Specialgeschichte der Militärgrenze: aus Originalquellen und Quellenwerken geschöpft. Aus der Kaiserlich-Königlichen Hof- und Staatsdruckerei.
- Wrede, Alphons von (1898a). Geschichte der K. und K. Wehrmacht. Vol. 1. L. W. Seidel.
- Wrede, Alphons von (1898b). Geschichte der K. und K. Wehrmacht. Vol. 2. L. W. Seidel.
