= List of rebellions in the Habsburg monarchy =

Revolts against the House of Austria between 1526–1918

Rebellions in the Habsburg monarchy are revolts against the dynasty known by that name in the years 1526–1918, when it ruled over a number of states in Central Europe (starting with the death of the king of Hungary and of Bohemia at the Battle of Mohács in 1526, in accordance with the 1515 Congress of Vienna, the Habsburg dynast became his heir, a situation which endured until the end of the First World War). This does not include the realms also ruled by the Habsburgs in Iberia and the Netherlands during the 15th-18th centuries. Included are only the possessions of the Austrian branch or House of Austria, mainly including Bohemia, Hungary and Croatia)..

The list is incomplete, and so far mainly concentrates on revolts from Bohemia, Hungary and Croatia.

- 1547 Bohemian Estates Revolt against absolutist imperial policies and recatolisation measures. It was fought alongside the
- Schmalkaldic War (1546–1547) between the allied forces of Charles V and the Lutheran Schmalkaldic League (a large-scale war between states, not a rebellion by estates, soldiers, or civilians)
- Anti-Habsburg rebellion (1604–06), in the Kingdom of Hungary, led by Stephen Bocskai
- Bohemian rebellion (1618–20), Bohemia
- Vlach uprisings in Moravia (1618–44), in Moravia.
- Uskok rebellion (1621), by Uskoks (irregular Military Frontier soldiers) due to forced relocation after Uskok War (1615–1617)
- Varaždin rebellion (1632), broke out in the Varaždin generalate (Slavonian Military Frontier) when the frontiersmen rose up against local Austrian governors. The rebellion was suppressed, and knez (count) Marko Bogdanović and harambaša Smiljan Vujica (or Smoljan Vujić) were executed.
- Varaždin rebellion (1665–1666), broke out in the Varaždin generalate when frontiersmen under Stefan Osmokruhović rose up against the Austrian officers, after the rights of the frontiersmen had been compromised.
- Magnate conspiracy (1660s–1671)
- Anti-Habsburg rebellion (1678–82), led by Imre Thököly
- Rákóczi's War of Independence (1703–11)
- Bavarian People's Uprising (1705–06)
- Karlovac rebellion (1746), in the Military Frontier
- Uskok rebellion (1754), in the Military Frontier
- Varaždin rebellion (1755), also known as Severin Uprising, led by Petar Ljubojević, in the Military Frontier
- Revolt of Horea, Cloșca, and Crișan (1784), Romanian-led revolt in Transylvania
- Revolutions of 1848 in the Austrian Empire
  - Hungarian Revolution of 1848
  - Ruthenian/Ukrainian political moves (see Supreme Ruthenian Council)
  - Serb uprising of 1848–1849
  - Transylvanian Revolution: the Romanians
  - Revolutions of 1848 in the Italian states- see Republic of San Marco, Five Days of Milan, First Italian War of Independence
  - Revolution in the Austrian lands, including:
    - the German Austrian lands taking part in the German revolutions
    - Czech uprising in Prague

== See also ==
- List of revolutions and rebellions
- Popular revolts in late medieval Europe

Revolts agains the Spanish Habsburgs

- Revolt of the Comuneros (1520–1522) by citizens of Castile
- Revolt of Ghent (1539–1540) by citizens of the Flemish city

Earlier revolts in the region

- Hussite Wars (1419-1434)
- Transylvanian peasant revolt (1437), popular revolt, Kingdom of Hungary
- Peasants' uprising led by György Dózsa (1514), Banate of Severin, Hungarian Kingdom
