= Statuta Valachorum =

1630 decree by the Holy Roman Emperor

Statuta Valachorum ("Vlach Statute(s)", Serbo-Croatian: Vlaški statut(i)) was a decree issued by Emperor Ferdinand II of the Habsburg monarchy on 5 October 1630 that defined the rights of "Vlachs" (a term used for a community of mostly Orthodox refugees, a term which apart from Vlachs included Serbs and speakers of other languages) in the Military Frontier, in a way that it placed them under direct rule by Vienna, removing the jurisdiction of the Croatian parliament. This was one of three major laws enacted in the early 17th century on the taxation and tenancy rights of the Vlachs, together with the earlier 1608 decree by Emperor Rudolf II and a 1627 decree by Ferdinand.

== Background ==
In the mid-16th century, the Military Frontier was established as a buffer against the Ottoman Empire. Balkan refugees, including Orthodox groups such as Serbs, Vlachs and speakers of other languages, crossed into Habsburg lands. The Vlachs left mountainous homelands and settled in the Ottoman conquered territories, from which a large number of them moved to the Habsburg area in Croatia. This process began in the second half of the 16th century with concentration in Upper Slavonia where they lived in accordance with their traditions which later became part of Statuta Valachorum. Vlachs of Varaždin Generalate were once romanized groups which later gradually became Slavicized and integrated into the Greek Orthodox Church. In the sources fugitives without exception are called Vlachs and names Uskoks, Pribezi, Predavci are rarely used. Military colonists were exempted from some obligations and granted small land tracts, and allowed to elect their own captains (vojvode) and magistrates (knezovi). In the second half of the 16th century Vlachs from Slavonia were no longer an exclusive part of population because the Vlach privileges were attractive for many non-Vlachs who mixed with the Vlachs in order to get their status. A large migration of Serbs (called "people of Rascians or Vlachs") into Croatia and Slavonia from Ottoman territory took place in 1600. Vlachs moved to the Varaždin Generalate of the Slavonian Krajina massively and in a very short time from 1597 to 1600. Freedom of religion was promised to all Orthodox settlers. The Habsburg Monarchy was effectively divided into separate civil and military parts with Emperor Ferdinand's granting full civil and military authority of the Military Frontier to a general officer in 1553. This displeased the Hungarian Diet and Croatian nobility, stripped of their authority in the Frontier. The Croatians tried to reduce the Frontier's autonomy; the incorporation of the Frontier into Croatia would mean the loss of status and prerogative of the Grenzers (Frontiersmen).

In 1608, Austrian emperor Rudolf II instituted such a law, under which "Vlachs" of the Military Frontier, regardless of their faith, owed one tenth of their income to the Bishop of Zagreb, and 1/9th to the feudal lords whose land they occupied. This law had little practical effect, but it appeased the Croatian nobility at the time. The heraldic emblem used for these "Vlachs" was the Serbian Nemanjić dynasty coat of arms. Serbs were issued a Vlachs Diploma by Rudolf II after refuge of Arsenije III Crnojević, the heraldic emblem used for these "Vlachs" was the Serbian coat of arms of Nemanjić dynasty. In the 1610s and 1620s, there were conflicts between the Vlachs (refugees and Frontiersmen) and the Croatian nobility. The Croatians demanded the abolishment of the Frontier and incorporation into Croatia. In 1627, the Varaždin Grenzer told authorities they "rather be hacked into pieces than be separated from their officers and become subjects of the Croatian nobility". In 1627, emperor Ferdinand II granted the "Vlach people inhabiting the regions of Slavonia and Croatia, the right to stay undisturbed in their settlements and estates"; the Frontier Vlachs were allowed land use regardless of the land's ownership, in an effort to make the Grenzers independent of the Croatian nobility, and more willing to wage wars for him. This decision has been interpreted as a feudalization attempt, and in 1628, it was feared that if the Vlachs left the Frontier for Ottoman Slavonia, the military and economical strength of the Habsburg monarchy would be notably weakened and threatened; at an assembly of ca. 3,400 war-equipped Vlachs (mainly Serbs), it was promised that the Vlachs stay under military organization and be given regulations in form of a statute, thereby regulating their legal status. The next year, the Croatian parliament tried once again to pass a law in which the refugee community be included into the jurisdiction of the Habsburg Kingdom of Croatia, however, without results.

In early 1630, representatives of Croatian nobility and Vlachs (Serbs) met in Vienna. The Croatian nobility pressured the Emperor to enact a decree on 10 May in which the Serbs pay the nobility as much as they paid their captains, however, the unhappy Serbs between the Sava and Drava instead gave colonel Trauttmansdorff their own draft, which would regulate relations to the state, and economical, legal and social relations. The War Council established a commission to study this draft. The Austrian court chancellery issued a statement to the emperor on 30 September, in which it is highlighted that "great military importance of the Vlach population accommodated between the Sava and Drava, whose numbers in the last thirty years increased to such extent that they have become the solid bulwark of the Military Frontier against the Turks".

== Statute ==
Based on the Grenzers' petitions and the court statement, Emperor Ferdinand II issued the Statuta Valachorum on 5 October 1630, in effect in the Varaždin generalate, that is, the captaincies of Koprivnica, Križevci and Ivanec. The statute was signed in Regensburg, and was a compromise to the Grenzers' demands. It was given to a delegation of twelve Grenzers, military commanders and clergy. The Orthodox refugee community, called "Vlachs", were mainly Serbs. Privileges of Grenzers (called as "Vlachs" or "Morlachs") on the northern and northwestern border of Bosnia in 1630 was confirmed by Ferdinand II in "Statuta Valachorum". Under Vlach name was and a good part of the local Croatian population while Catholic population in Military Frontier also converted to Orthodoxy. During discussions of the Military Frontier administrative authorities of the Varaždin Generalate, it was established that among the Vlachs fugitives exist Slavonians whose ancestors were serfs who did not flied from the Ottomans and they are mixed among themselves. In its essence, the statute enabled for the Vlachs' election of local authorities, an argument for the consideration of the statute as that of a basis for the population's inner autonomy. The local authorities included knezes and judges, as representatives of executive and legislative powers.

The decree laid out the rights and obligations of the settlers that stabilized their status for years after. These rights assumed free land given to the settlers, their civil administration based on the settlers' traditional law. All the rights were given in return for the settlers' military service to the Austrian Emperor. All males over sixteen were obliged to serve militarily. Ferdinand II did not include matters of land ownership in the statute, so that he wouldn't upset Croatian nobility. The goal of Statuta Valachorum was to bring the "Vlachs" under supervision of the imperial court, giving them an appearance of autonomy, despite the fact that the level of self-government they had prior had actually decreased. The Statute created a separate region at the expense of the Croatia-Slavonia province. The statute also included the first delineation of the Varaždin generalate (Slavonian Military Frontier).

== Aftermath and legacy ==
The Statuta, applied only to Vlachs in the area of the Varaždin Generalate (between Drava and Sava), later came to be used by all Vlachs. A rebellion broke out in the generalate in 1632, when the Frontiersmen rose up against local Austrian governors; the rebellion was suppressed, and knez (count) Marko Bogdanović and harambaša Smiljan Vujica (or Smoljan Vujić) were executed. To determine who has benefits from Statuta Valachorum decree in 1635 a commission was established which supposed to separate real Vlachs from private Vlachs, Slavonians (indigenous population of Slavonia) which are also called Vlachs and Predavci. By engaging this and some others commission with assignment to separate true Vlachs from Slavonians, Predavci and private Vlachs this commission only partially succeed because these different groups lived together for a long time, and there were administrative reasons as well. The serfs continued fled to Military Frontier despite this commission and decision that they should no longer be accepted, so in 1644 the Ferdinand III had to order that General of the Slavonian Military Frontier stop such crossings to Varaždin Generalate. When Ferdinand III came to power (1637), the ownership of the Croatian Military Frontier was transferred to the Imperial court. A rebellion broke out in the generalate in 1665–66 when Frontiersmen under Stefan Osmokruhović rose up against the Austrian officers, after the rights of the Frontiersmen had been compromised. On 14 April 1667 the Statute was revised. In the 18th century, the nobility was finally formally deprived of all Frontier land when it was declared an Imperial fief.

The importance of the statute is seen in it being the first public law document regarding rights of citizens within the Military Frontier. These grants to Serbs made them valuable allies of the Habsburg government against the Catholic Croatian nobility. The warrior-tradition of the Serbs of Croatia, which includes the service to the Habsburg monarchy and the Statuta Valachorum, is an important part of the identity of the community still today. About service of Grencers in Habsburg Monarchy testify documents which includes and the Statuta Valachorum from 1630 which applies to both Orthodox and Catholic Grencers.

== See also ==
- Vlach law
- Supplex Libellus Valachorum

== Annotations ==
1. The term "Vlachs" was also used for Slavs who shared the same pastoral nomadic subsistence mode with the historical Vlachs. As such, it was also used for the Serbs who settled the Military Frontier.
  In historiography, the ethnicity of the settlers has been a subject of debate. Viewpoints which have presented the origin of the Vlach settlers as predominantly Serb have been criticized for overemphasizing the Slavic origin of a part of the settler groups.
  On the other hand, in Croatian nationalist historiography (including Ustashe propaganda) it has been claimed most Serbs of Croatia who are descendants of those settlers, are in fact Vlachs. All South Slavic ethnic groups had some Romance-speaking origin, although there is no evidence that all or most Serbs in Croatia were of Vlach origin. "Rascians" was another term used for the Serbs.

== Sources ==
- Budak, Neven (2002). "Habsburzi i Hrvati". Kolo (in Croatian) (3). Matica hrvatska.
- Kaser, Karl (1995). Familie und Verwandtschaft auf dem Balkan: Analyse einer untergehenden Kultur (in German). Böhlau Verlag Wien. ISBN 978-3-205-98345-3.
- Kašić, Dušan (1967). Srbi i pravoslavlje u Slavoniji i sjevernoj Hrvatskoj (in Serbian). Savez udruženja pravosl. sveštenstva SR Hrvatske.
- Kašić, Dušan (1957). "Beiträge zur Geschichte der "Statuta Valachorum"". Spomenik (in Serbo-Croatian) (106): 37–49. OCLC 78778459.
- Kršev, Boris N. (2011). "STATUTA VALACHORUM – Pravna osnova nastanka Vojne granice - Krajine" (PDF). Civitas (in Serbian) (2). Novi Sad: Fakultet za pravne i poslovne studije.
- Lampe, John R.; Jackson, Marvin R. (1982). Balkan Economic History, 1550-1950: From Imperial Borderlands to Developing Nations. Indiana University Press. ISBN 0-253-30368-0.
- Ramet, Sabrina P. (1997). Whose Democracy?: Nationalism, Religion, and the Doctrine of Collective Rights in Post-1989 Eastern Europe. Rowman & Littlefield. ISBN 978-0-8476-8324-6.
- Sučević, Branko P. (1953). "Razvitak Vlaških Prava u Varaždinskom generalatu" (PDF). Historijski Zbornik (in Croatian) (6): 33–70.
- Trbovich, Ana S. (2008). A Legal Geography of Yugoslavia's Disintegration. Oxford University Press, USA. ISBN 978-0-19-533343-5.
