= Ljubojević =

Ljubojević (Serbian Cyrillic: Љубojeвић, pronounced [ʎubǒːjeʋitɕ]) is a Serbo-Croatian surname. Notable people with the surname include:

- Darko Ljubojević (born 1975), retired Bosnian Serb footballer
- Divna Ljubojević (born 1970), Serbian singer
- Goran Ljubojević (born 1983), retired Croatian footballer
- Ljubomir Ljubojević (born 1950), Serbian Grandmaster of chess
- Petar Ljubojević, Austrian captain of the Varaždin Generalate
