= Stefan Osmokruhović =

Great judge

Stefan Osmokruhović (Note: Name: His surname may also be written as: Osmokrug (Осмокруг), Osmokruh (Осмокрух) and Osmokruč.) (German: Stefan Osmokruch, Serbian Cyrillic: Стефан Осмокруховић; fl. 1665–died in 1666) was the great judge (de. Grossrichter, sr. veliki sudac) of the Križevci captainate, who in 1665 led a revolt of the Grenz infantry soldiers in the Varaždin generalate of the Military Frontier against the Austrian officers, after the rights of the frontiersmen had been compromised.

A Serb, Osmokruhović held secret meetings in the Slavonian Military Frontier, in which many Serbs took part in. He was also supported by the judges of Koprivnica and Ivanica, Ilija Romanović and Nikola Vuković, and they all sent letters to the Austrian Leopold I, Holy Roman Emperor about the issues in March 1666. Appointed the commander of the Varaždin frontiersmen themselves and named great judge (Veliki Sudac), he claimed to answer to no one besides the Austrian Emperor, and sought that the frontiersmen's right to ownership of the land between the Sava and Drava be recognized, among other issues. Austrian lieutenant general Fra Johann Josef Herberstein (1639-1689) went to Križevci and demanded that his candidate be accepted as great judge, but the candidate was murdered by the frontiersmen. The revolt was finally suppressed in 1666 by Herberstein, and Osmokruhović was sentenced to death.

== See also ==
- Statuta Valachorum
- Slavonian Military Frontier
- Petar Ljubojević
