= 1547 Bohemian Estates Revolt =

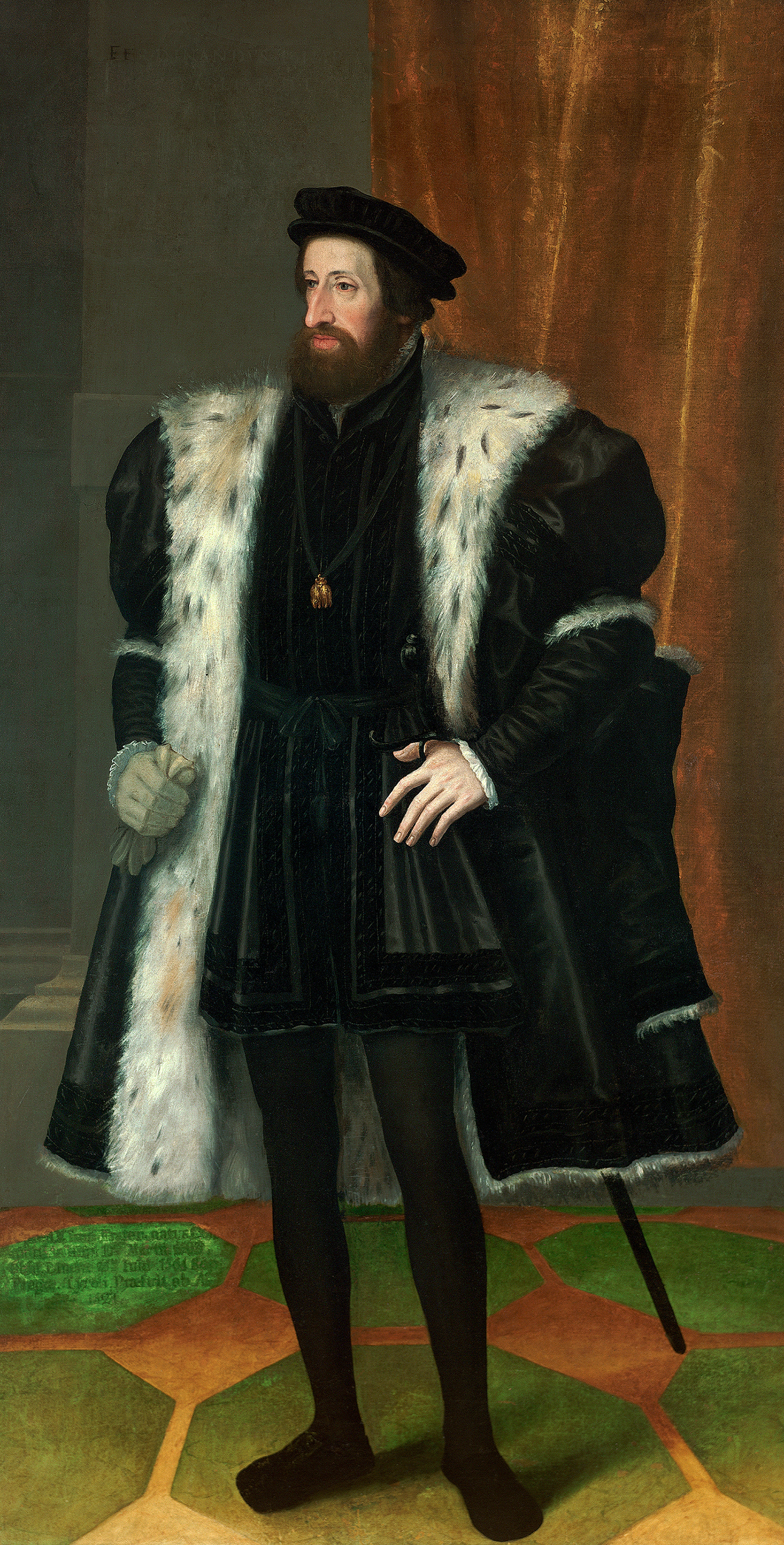
King of Bohemia Ferdinand I of Habsburg (1527–1564), who attempted to centralize and recatolize the lands of the Bohemian Crown, which triggered the Prague uprising of the Estates of 1547. Portrait by Hans Bocksberger der Ältere

The Estates Revolt (Czech: Stavovský odboj roku 1547) was the first anti-Habsburg uprising of the Czech estates, which took place in Prague in January–July 1547, and the third uprising of the estates in the Habsburg Empire after the Revolt of the Comuneros in Spain (1520–1522) and the Revolt of Ghent in Flanders (1539–1540). The uprising was triggered by the absolutist policies of King Ferdinand I of Habsburg, aimed at reducing the political influence of the privileged estates and the recatolization of the lands of the Bohemian Crown.

== Background ==
In the 1520s, the religious situation in Bohemia was complex. Its German population was composed of Catholics and Lutherans. Some Czechs were receptive to Lutheranism, but most of them adhered to Utraquist Hussitism, while a minority of them adhered to Roman Catholicism. A significant number of Utraquists favoured an alliance with the Protestants. At first, Ferdinand accepted this situation and he gave considerable freedom to the Bohemian estates. In the 1540s, the situation changed. In Germany, while most Protestant princes had hitherto favored negotiation with the Emperor and while many had supported him in his wars, they became increasingly confrontational during this decade. Some of them even went to war against the Empire, and many Bohemian (German or Czech) Protestants or Utraquists sympathized with them.

== The beginning of the uprising ==
The most active supporters of the uprising were the citizens of Prague, as well as the nobles who belonged to the community of the Unitas fratrum, or Bohemian Brethren (predecessors of the Moravian Church). A direct reason for the Prague uprising of the Estates was the attempt of Ferdinand I to provide military and financial support to his brother Emperor Charles V in his war with the Protestant Schmalkaldic League of German principalities. In December 1546, King Ferdinand I tried to obtain the consent of the General Sejm to allocate funds to finance the imperial troops, but received a categorical refusal. The estates and a large part of the nobility of Bohemia had denied him support in the German campaign.

== See also ==
- List of rebellions in the Habsburg monarchy

== Bibliography ==
- Tieftrunk, Karel (1872). Odpor stavův českých proti Ferdinandovi I. L. 1547. Prague: V komisí u Františka Řivnáče.
- Janáček, Josef (1984). České dějiny. Kniha 1, 1526-1547. Díl 2, Doba předbělohorská. Prague: Academia.
- Janáček, Josef (1964). "K účasti pražanů v protihabsburském odboji roku 1547" (I) (Pražský sborník historický ed.). Prague: Pražská informační služba.
- Janáček, Josef (1950). "Uvod" (Sixt z Ottersdorfu. O pokoření stavu městskeho léta 1547 ed.). Prague: Melantrich.
