= Seressaner =

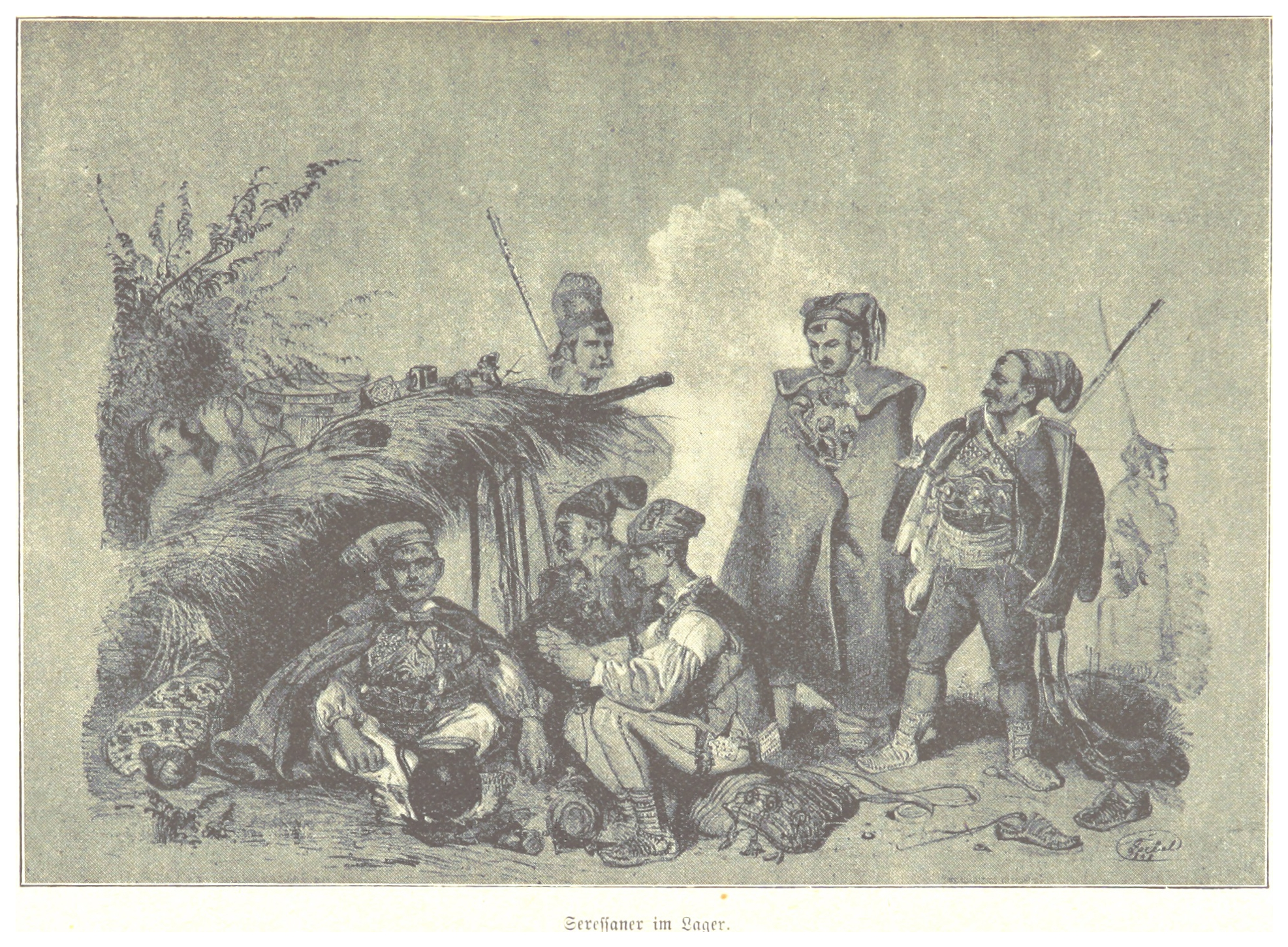
Illustration of a group of Seressaner during the 1848 Revolutions.

The Seressaner (German: Serezaner, Croatian: serežani, Serbian: сережани) were an Habsburg military police unit in Lika, Croatian Military Frontier. The name is derived from Saracens ("tent dwellers").

The Seressaner troops were established after the Treaty of Karlowitz (1699). It had both military and police duties. The members were not paid, but were freed from paying all taxes. As an irregular unit, they wore folk costumes rather than military uniforms. Over the following century, each regiment had one section of the serežani, led by a oberbaša or harambaša (sergeant), several unterbaša (corporal) and vicebaša (lance corporal). They organized the border patrols towards Bosnia, particularly on difficult terrain, and stopped incursions of bandits. They required extensive knowledge of the territory, good marksmanship and to be constantly under arms. They also maintained public law and order in the area of their regiment. There were also cavalry serežan units that served as escort to the high officers of Frontier regiments, carried urgent orders and carried out special patrol duties.

== See also ==
- Trenck's Pandurs
