= Petar Ljubojević =

Austrian soldier

Petar Ljubojević (Serbian Cyrillic: Петар Љубојевић) was an Austrian captain of the Varaždin Generalate (Slavonian Military Frontier) who led the Varaždin frontiersmen in revolt (1754–55). He was called "father and mother of the Varaždin frontier" (otac i majka varaždinske granice). The revolt was organized in the Orthodox church at Severin.

== See also ==
- Stefan Osmokruhović
- Harambasha Smiljan Vujić
- Marko Bogdanović (knjaz)
