= Military Frontier =

Habsburg region bordering the Ottomans (1553–1881)

Military Frontier Militärgrenze (German)
- 1553–1881
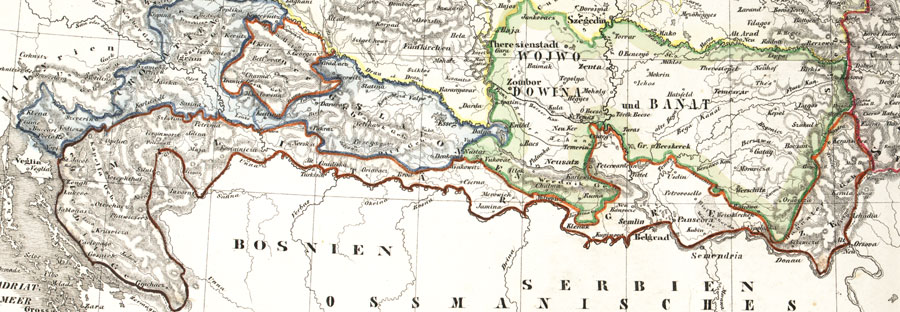
- Map of the Military Frontier (marked with a red outline) in 1800
- Status: Military province
- Religion: Catholic Church; Eastern Orthodox Church
- Historical era: Early Modern period
  - Established (Note: The listed years indicate when specific regions were placed under direct Habsburg military jurisdiction. Domestic territories—including Croatia, Slavonia, Transylvania, and the Banat of Temeswar—continued to exist under separate civil administrations, while territories of the Ottoman Empire were permanently annexed following military conquest.): 1553
  - Disestablished (Note: The listed years indicate when specific districts of the Military Frontier were demilitarised and returned to civilian rule. Following the Austro-Hungarian Compromise of 1867, the Ottoman threat had diminished, making permanent martial law obsolete. The Transylvanian district was integrated first in 1853, followed by the Hungarian and Banat districts between 1871 and 1873. The process concluded on 1 August 1881, when Emperor Franz Joseph I officially abolished the remaining Croatian and Slavonian districts, fully reintegrating them into the civil administration of the autonomous Kingdom of Croatia-Slavonia.): 1881
Preceded by
1553: Kingdom of Croatia
1699: Ottoman Empire
1745: Kingdom of Slavonia
1751: Banat of Temeswar
1762: Principality of Transylvania
Succeeded by
1853: Principality of Transylvania
1871–1873: Lands of the Crown of Saint Stephen
1881: Kingdom of Croatia-Slavonia

The Military Frontier was a borderland of the Habsburg monarchy and later the Austrian and Austro-Hungarian Empire. It acted as the cordon sanitaire against incursions from the Ottoman Empire.

The new defence system in Hungary and Croatia was established in the 16th century, following the election of Ferdinand I as king. The Habsburgs established six districts under special military administration in Hungary and Croatia. The Croatian Military Frontier and the Slavonian Military Frontier came under the jurisdiction of the Croatian Sabor and ban. In 1627, the Habsburg military placed them under direct control. For more than two centuries, they retained complete civilian and military authority over the area until the abolition of the Military Frontier in 1881.

During the 17th century, the territory expanded eastward, and new sections were created. By then, it stretched from Croatia proper in the west to eastern Transylvania in the east and included parts of present-day Croatia, Bosnia and Herzegovina, Serbia, Romania and Hungary. During this period, the defence system was also changed, from a conventional garrison model to one of 'soldier-settler' communities.

The inhabitants of the area were known as the Grenzer (or frontiersmen). They were mostly Serbian, Croatian, German, Vlach and other colonists. In exchange for land-grants, religious freedom and favorable tax rates, they colonized the area and served as the bulwark for the monarchy against Ottoman incursions. Germans were recruited in the late 18th century by the Habsburg monarchy to resettle and develop the Danube River Valley in the Kingdom of Hungary, and became known as Danube Swabians. The military regiments formed by the settlers had a vested reason to fight and were familiar with the local terrain and conditions. They soon gained a formidable military reputation.

== Background ==
King Matthias Corvinus's anti-Ottoman defense system in 1500

The Ottoman wars in Europe caused the border of the Kingdom of Hungary – and subsequently that of the Habsburg monarchy – to shift towards the northwest. Much of the old Croatian territory either became Ottoman land or bordered the new Ottoman domain.

In 1435, in an attempt to strengthen the defences against the Ottomans and Venice, King Sigismund founded the so-called tabor, a military encampment, each in Croatia, Slavonia and Usora. In 1463, King Matthias Corvinus founded the banovina of Jajce and Srebrenik, and in 1469 the military captaincy of Senj, modeled after the Ottoman captaincies in the Province of Bosnia. These actions aimed to improve defence but ultimately proved unsuccessful. They did, however, lead to the development of the Pandur infantry and the Hussar cavalry.

Soldiers known as "Martolos" and "Voynuks" were the most dangerous military element under the Ottomans, while Vlachs and Serbs who fled from the Ottomans in the 15th century had a similar military tradition which the Habsburgs began to use on their side of the border. Under the Habsburgs, they created a special system of land ownership and military organisation: a military frontier. This military border was the site of major war campaigns, but it mostly consisted of unending clashes between Ottoman and Habsburg forces.

== History ==
=== 16th century ===
After the Croatian Parliament elected the Austrian Habsburgs as kings of Croatia in 1526, Ferdinand I promised the Croatian Parliament that he would give them 200 cavalrymen and 200 infantrymen, and that he would pay for another 800 cavalrymen who would be commanded by the Croatians. Soon the Habsburg monarchy founded another captaincy in Bihać. In the short term, this was ineffective: in 1529 the Ottomans swept through the area, captured Buda, and besieged Vienna, wreaking havoc throughout the Croatian border areas.

The Habsburgs aimed to hold Ottoman forces on Hungarian and Croatian territory before they could reach Austria, but they lacked a clear defence plan. In the 1530s, the Habsburgs sent significant reinforcements only to the most important forts on the border with the Ottoman Empire. In the 1540s and following the Ottoman campaign of 1552, several conferences were held in which a new defence strategy was adopted. Separate defence zones were to be established in parts of Hungary and Croatia around the border forts. Austrian and Bohemian provinces were obligated to help finance this new system, beginning in the 1550s. At the end of the 1560s, the new border system consisted of around 100–120 forts and extended from the Adriatic Sea to Transylvania. It was organized into six Border Fortress Captain Generalcies (Grenzgeneralat):

1. The Croatian and Adriatic Border Fortress Captain Generalcy (kroatische und Meergrenze), centred initially in Bihać, and from 1579 in Karlovac;
2. The Slavonian or Wendish Captain Generalcy (slawonische/windische Grenze), centred in Varaždin, after 1578 known as the Wendish-Bajcsavár Captain Generalcy;
3. The Kanizsa Captain Generalcy (kanischarische Grenze), centred in Kanizsa. Renamed the Captain Generalcy across from Kanizsa (gegenüber von Kanischa liegende Grenze) following the loss of Kanizsa in 1600;
4. The Györ Captain Generalcy (Raaber/raaberische Grenze), protecting Vienna;
5. The Captain Generalcy Defending the Mining Towns (bergstädtische Grenze), centred in Léva, and in Érsekújvár after 1589;
6. The Upper Hungary or Kassa Captain Generalcy (oberungarische Grenze), centred in Kassa.

In addition, there were four District Captain Generalcies (Kreisgeneralat).

From the 1530s, immigration to the Military Frontier began to include many Martolos, Vlach military colonists and other irregulars who were part of the Ottoman military system; most were Christians, and some were Muslims.

New military expenditures became a major concern, and the Congress of Inner Austrian lands in Bruck an der Mur in 1578 defined each land's obligations in covering military expenses and set priorities for improving the defensive strategy. The Duchy of Styria would finance the Slavonian and Hungarian Frontiers, and the Duchy of Carniola would finance the Croatian Frontier. The Duchy of Carinthia put its finances at Styria's and Carniola's disposal to direct money where needed. In the 2nd half of the 16th century, there were around 20,000 troops stationed in Hungarian and Croatian border forts.

By the end of the 16th century, Slavicized Vlachs, other Vlachs, and Serbs fled from Ottoman territory to the Military Frontier and Dalmatia. At the same time, the Croatian Military Frontier became known as the Karlovac generalate, and from the 1630s the Upper Slavonian Military Frontier was known as the Varaždin generalat. During the 16th and 17th centuries, the military administration of the Frontier was moved away from the Croatian ban and the Sabor (Parliament) and instead placed under the high command of Archduke Charles and the War Council in Graz.

=== 17th century ===
Despite financial support from the Inner Austrian nobility, financing the Military Frontier was not efficient enough. The military leadership in Graz decided to try solutions other than mercenary units. In the 1630s, the Imperial Court decided to give land and certain privileges to immigrants to the Frontier (the uskok guerrillas as well as refugees from Ottoman-controlled lands) in the area of Žumberak. In return, they would serve in the Imperial army. The remaining local population was also encouraged to remain by receiving the status of free peasants (rather than serfs) and other privileges. These new units were organised into ten or more voivodeships per each captaincy.

In 1627, the Military Frontier was removed from the control of the Croatian Sabor and put under direct rule of the Habsburg military. It would have complete civilian and military authority over it until abolition of the Military Frontiers. In November 1630, Emperor Ferdinand II proclaimed the so-called Statuta Valachorum ("Vlach Statute"), which regulated the status of so-called Vlach settlers (which included Croats, Serbs and Vlachs) from the Ottoman Empire with regard to military command, their obligations, and rights to internal self-administration. Over time, the population of the Frontier (as it was then) became mixed between the autochthonous Croats and Croatian serfs who had fled the Ottoman territories, and the numerous minorities of the Serb and Vlach (who were later assimilated into Croats and Serbs) refugees who strove to expand their rights as a major contributor in the defence of the land. By creating a new military class in the Frontier, the territory eventually became fully detached from the Croatian Parliament and the ban. As they were granted freedom of faith, they preserved their Orthodox faith despite living in a Catholic country. Eventually, the entire male population of the Military Frontier became professional soldiers who served the Empire on several fronts and in many European wars, even after the Ottoman threat eased.

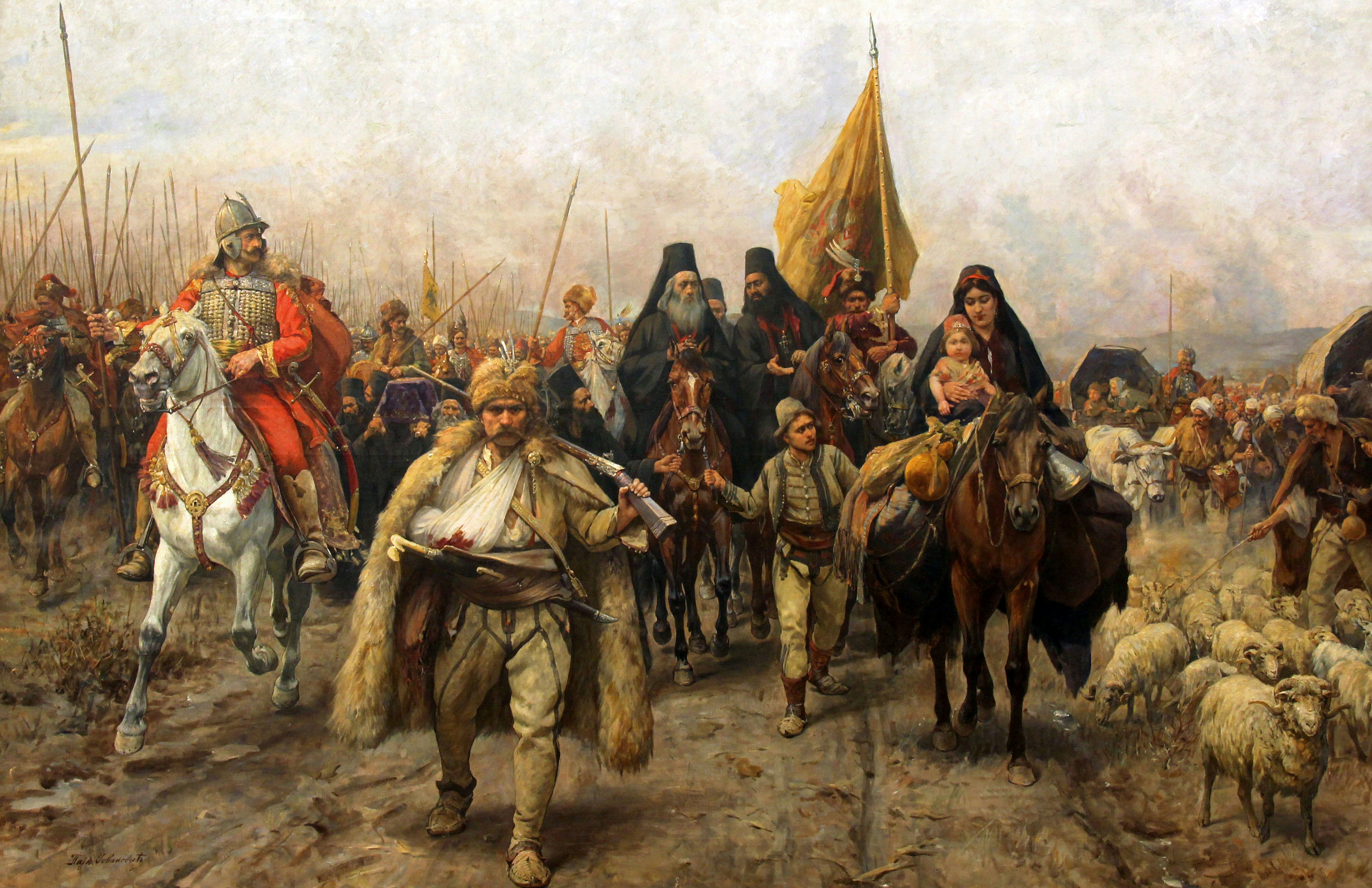
Migration of the Serbs (Seoba Srba), by Paja Jovanović, portrays Serbian Patriarch Arsenije III Čarnojević, surrounded by soldiers, flocks of sheep and women with babies, leading some 36,000 families from his seat in Peć, to what is now Vojvodina in 1690, after the failure of a Serb revolt.

During the 17th century, the Military Frontier expanded eastward, and new sections were created. By then, it stretched from Croatia in the west to eastern Transylvania in the east and included parts of present-day Croatia, Serbia, Romania and Hungary. The area was settled primarily with Croatian, Serbian and German colonists (known as grenzer and graničari) who, in return for land grants, served in the military units defending the empire against Ottomans. The majority of immigrants were Serbs, and some were ethnic Croats, mainly from Bosnia. A large migration of Serbs to Habsburg lands was undertaken by Patriarch Arsenije III Čarnojević. The large community of Serbs concentrated in Banat, southern Hungary, and the Military Frontier included merchants and craftsmen in the cities, but mainly refugees who were peasants.

The 17th century was relatively peaceful, with only small raids from the Province of Bosnia. After the Ottoman army was repelled at the Battle of Vienna in 1683, the Great Turkish War ended with much of the former Croatian lands under Habsburg control. Despite this, the Frontier system was retained and expanded onto former Ottoman territories in Lika, Kordun, Banija, lower Slavonia, Syrmia, Bačka, Banat, Pomorišje, and Transylvania. The Habsburg Empire valued its ability to centrally control the area and draft cheap, numerous army units.

After the Treaty of Karlowitz of 1699, the Seressaner troops were established with both military and police duties. They were unpaid but exempt from taxes. Over the following century, each regiment had a section of Seressaners that organised border patrols towards Bosnia, particularly on difficult terrain, and stopped bandit incursions.

Orthodox Christians who settled the Military Frontier from the Ottoman Empire were called in sources "Vlachs schismatics", and Vlachs or Uskoks; other names which are mentioned are "Valachi seu Rasciani", "Valachi seu Serviani", "Valachi seu Graeci", Vlachs or Morlachs, "Illirica gens graeci ritus" and "homines Ritus Ruthenici seu Graeci". During the 17th and first half of the 18th century, Catholic natives and Catholics immigrated from Bosnia, and the Kingdom of Croatia also converted to Orthodoxy. Most documents state that the Vlachs arrived "from Turkey" or "from Bosnia", i.e. the Bosnia Eyalet.

=== 18th century ===
When the lands of Croatia and Hungary returned in 1699 and 1718, after being occupied by the Ottomans, the vast majority of the area became the Military Frontier. Throughout the entire region of this frontier, various ethnic groups were settled, including Croats, Serbs, Albanians and others, who were also all together called Vlachs. From 1718 to 1739 the Military Frontier also included the Habsburg-controlled northern parts of present-day Bosnia and Herzegovina. In the mid-18th century the Frontier was once again reorganized and modelled after the Imperial army and its regular regiments. In 1737, the Vlach Statute was formally abolished. All previous captaincies and voivodships were discarded, and the area was instead subdivided into general-commands, regiments (Serbo-Croatian: pukovnije) and companies:

- Varaždin general command
  - Križevci regiment
  - Đurđevac regiment
- Karlovac general command
  - Lika regiment
  - Otočac regiment
  - Ogulin regiment
  - Slunj regiment
- Zagreb general command
  - Glina regiment
  - Petrinja regiment
- Slavonia general command
  - Gradiška regiment
  - Brod regiment
  - Petrovaradin regiment
- Banat general command
  - Serb (Illyrian) section
  - German section
  - Romanian (Vlach) section

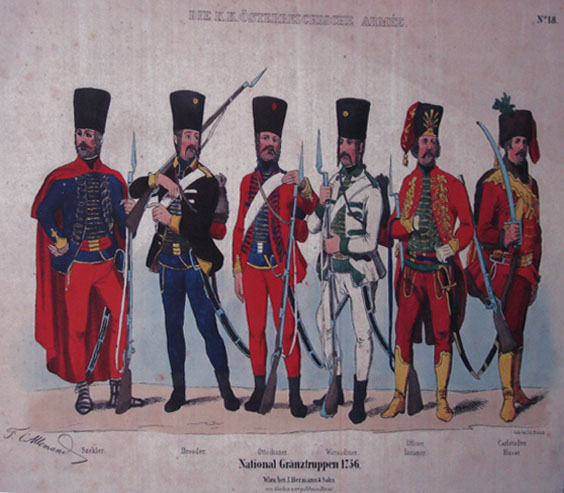
Various Frontier troops, 1756

After 1767, every twelfth inhabitant of the Military Frontier was a soldier – in contrast to every 62nd inhabitant in the rest of the Habsburg Monarchy. The Frontier soldiers became a professional military force, ready to deploy to battlefields across Europe. Due to further immigration of refugees from the Ottoman domain, and to the expansion of the territory to places previously controlled by the Ottomans, the population of the Frontier became even more mixed. Many autochthonous Serbs and Croats remained in Slavonia and parts of present-day Vojvodina (Syrmia, Bačka, and Banat). However, at this time they became outnumbered by the Serb, Croat and Vlach refugees/immigrants. Some Germans, Poles, Magyars and Slovaks also came to the Frontier, mostly as administrative personnel, and a number of other settlers and military personnel arrived from other parts of the Habsburg Empire – Czechs, Poles, Slovaks, Ukrainians, Rusyns and others.

In 1783 the Croatian and Slavonian frontiers came under the unified control of the Croatian General Command headquartered in Zagreb.

The Serbian Free Corps of 5,000 soldiers had been established in Banat, composed of refugees who had fled earlier conflicts in the Ottoman Empire. The Corps would fight for the liberation of Serbia and for unification under Habsburg rule. Several freikorps operated along the Habsburg-Ottoman frontier. The Austrians used the Corps in two failed attempts to seize Belgrade, in late 1787 and in early 1788.

Serbia was subsequently liberated and organised into a Habsburg protectorate. On 8 October 1789 Ernst Gideon von Laudon took over Belgrade. Austrian forces occupied Serbia, and many Serbs fought in the Habsburg free corps, gaining organisational and military skills. By 1791, however, the Austrians were forced into withdrawal across the Danube and Sava rivers, joined by thousands of Serb families who feared Ottoman persecution. The Treaty of Sistova (1791) ended the Austro-Turkish War of 1787.

In 1787, the civil administration became separate from the military, but this was reversed in 1800.

=== 19th century ===
By the end of the 18th century, it had long been apparent that the Ottomans were in decline and were unlikely to attempt further invasions north of the Sava River. The Military Frontier thus began to outlive its usefulness. In 1848, Josip Jelačić, Ban of Croatia, became the commander of the Military Frontier. He pressed for the unification of Croatia, Slavonia, Dalmatia, and the Croatian-Slavonian Frontier. Although he did not have the power to abolish it, he secured approval for reforms and in 1848 the Military Frontier sent representatives to the Croatian Sabor, however, this was revoked in the 1850s. From 1850 the Frontier, Croatia and Slavonia formally constituted a single land, but with separate administration and representation. The whole area of the Military Frontier was under military administration. All population, regardless of age and sex, belonged to the army and was subject to Austrian military legislation. The Main Command had its headquarters in Zagreb, but remained directly subordinate to the Ministry of War in Vienna.

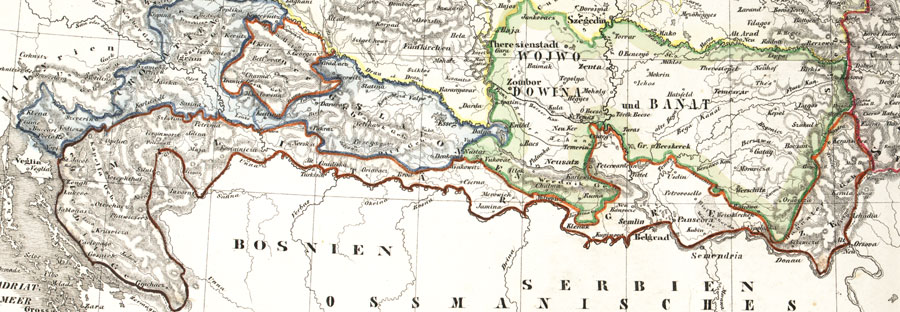
Map of the Military Frontier in the middle of the 19th century (marked with a red outline)

The Croatian Parliament made numerous pleas to demilitarise the Frontier after the Turkish wars subsided. The demilitarisation began in 1869 and on 8 August 1873, under Franz Joseph, the Banat Frontier was abolished and incorporated into the Kingdom of Hungary, while part of the Croatian Frontier (Križevci and Đurđevac regiments) was already incorporated into Croatia-Slavonia on 1 August 1871. The decree in which the rest of the Croatian and Slavonian frontiers were incorporated into Croatia-Slavonia was proclaimed on 15 July 1881, while incorporation began on 1 August 1881, when Ban of Croatia Ladislav Pejačević took over from the Zagreb General Command.

== Administration ==
=== Divisions ===
In the 18th and 19th centuries, the frontier was divided into several districts:

Division	Period	Notes
Danube Military Frontier	1702–1751	Comprised parts of southern Bačka (including Palanka, Petrovac, Petrovaradinski Šanac, Titel, etc.) and northern Syrmia (including Petrovaradin, Šid, etc.). After the abolishment of this section of the Frontier, one part of its territory was placed under civil administration, and another part was joined with other sections of the Frontier.
Tisa Military Frontier	1702–1751	Comprised parts of north-eastern Bačka (including Sombor, Subotica, Kanjiža, Senta, Bečej, etc.). After the abolishment of this section of the Frontier, most of its territory was placed under civil administration, while one small area in the south remained under military administration as part of the Šajkaš Battalion.
Mureș Military Frontier	1702–1751	This frontier included the region of Pomorišje, the area on the northern bank of the river Mureș. After abolishing this section, the entire territory was placed under civil administration.
Sava Military Frontier	1702–1751	It was located along the Sava river.
Banat Military Frontier	1751–1873	It was located on the present-day Serbian-Romanian border. It was divided into Serbian (Illyrian), German (Volksdeutscher) and Romanian (Vlach) sections.
Slavonian Military Frontier	1745–1881	It was located along Posavina, from eastern Croatia, following the river Sava, along the border with Bosnia-Herzegovina and Serbia, and stretched into Syrmia, until inflow into Danube near Zemun (today part of Belgrade). Its north-eastern border followed the Danube up until Petrovaradin.
Croatian Military Frontier	1553–1881	It was located on the border of Croatia and Bosnia. This part of the Military Frontier included the geographic regions of Lika, Kordun, Banovina (named after "Banska krajina"), and bordered the Adriatic Sea to the west, Venetian Republic to the south, Habsburg Croatia to the west, and the Ottoman Empire to the east. It extended onto the Slavonian Military Frontier near the confluence of the rivers Una and Sava.
Šajkaš Battalion	1763–1873	It was a small part of the Frontier, formed in 1763 from parts of the previously abolished Danube and Tisa sections of the frontier. In 1852, the Šajkaš Battalion was transformed into the Titel Infantry Battalion. It was abolished in 1873, and its territory was incorporated into Bačka-Bodrog County.
Transylvanian Military Frontier	1762–1851	It was located in the eastern and southern parts of Transylvania. It was composed of two Székely and two Romanian regiments. The establishment of the frontier was followed by the Mádéfalva Massacre (also known as Siculicidium).

=== Maps ===
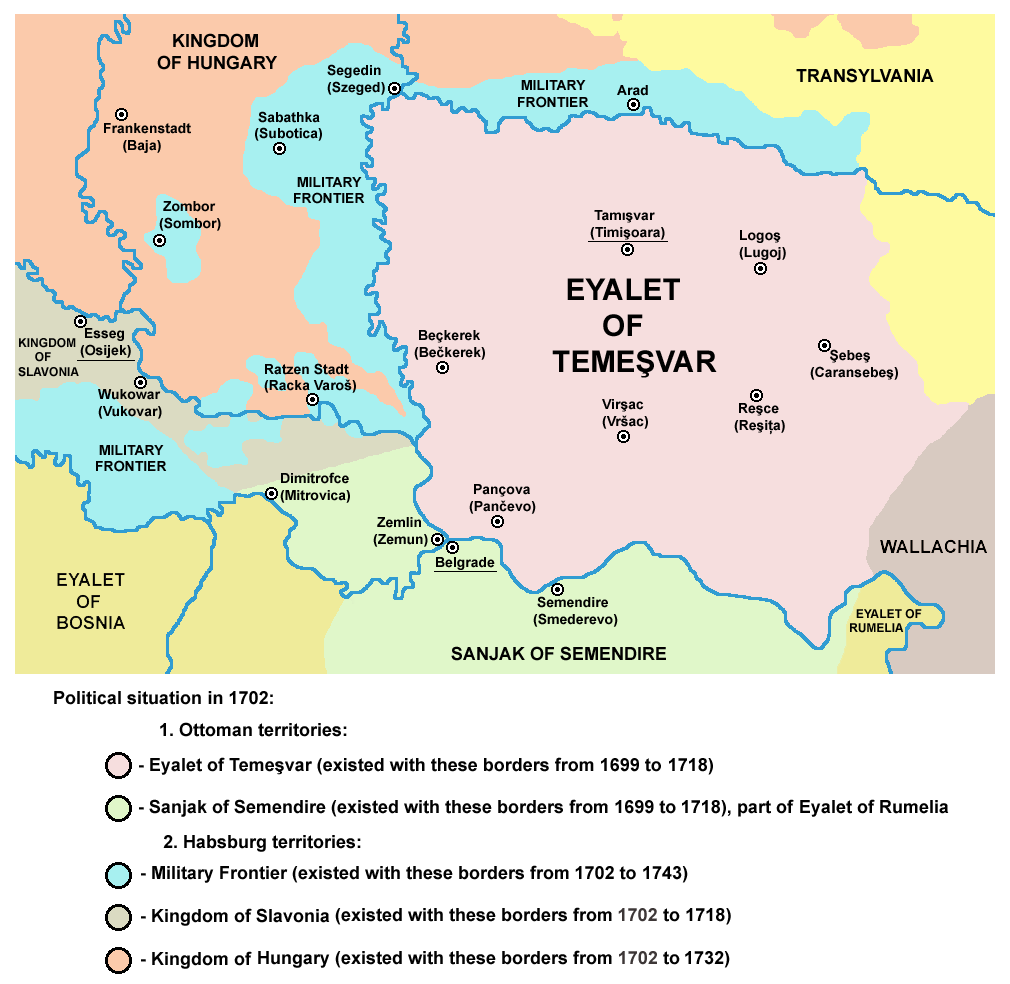
Map of Military Frontier sections in Syrmia, Bačka, and Pomorišje in 1699-1718

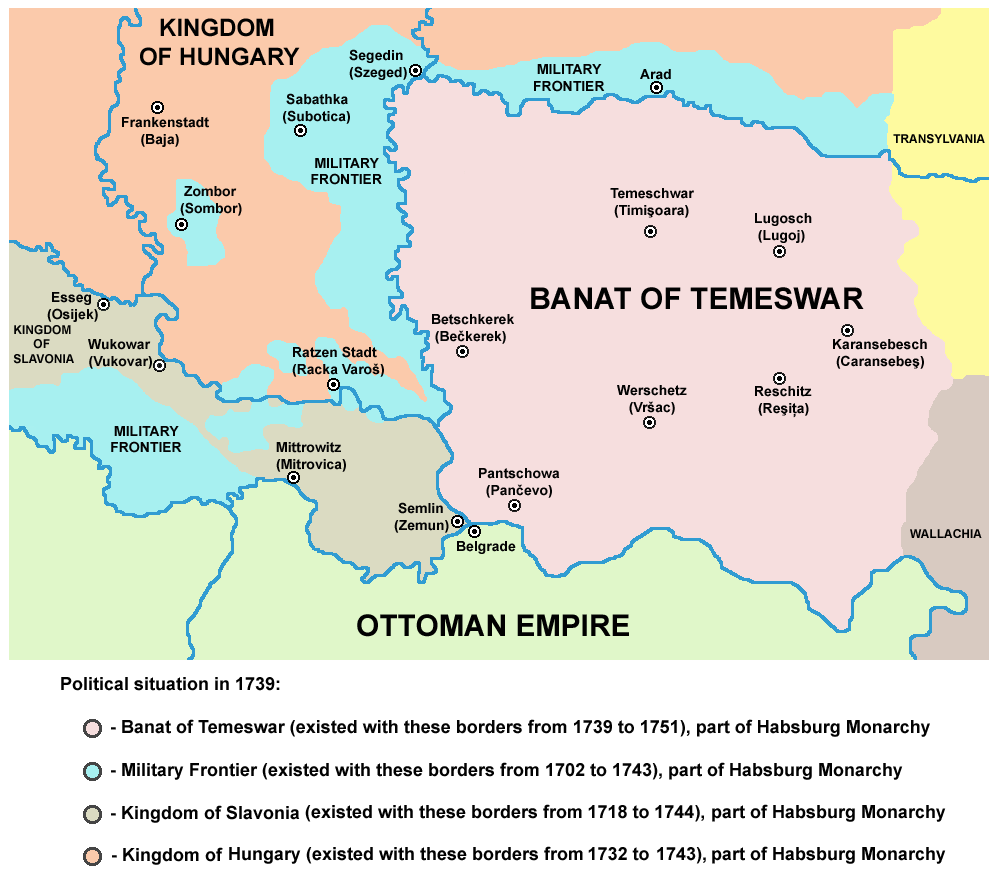
Map of Military Frontier sections in Syrmia, Bačka, and Pomorišje in 1718-1744

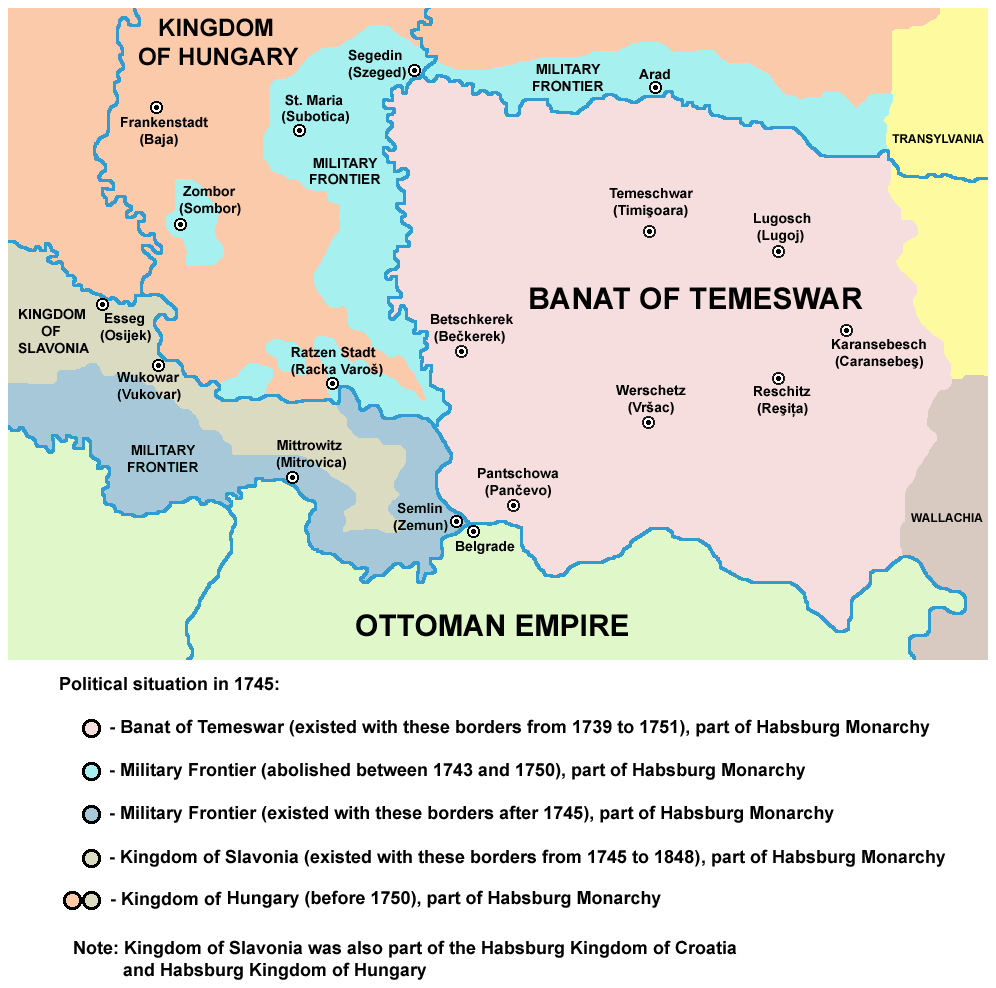
Map of Military Frontier sections in Syrmia, Bačka, and Pomorišje in 1744-1750

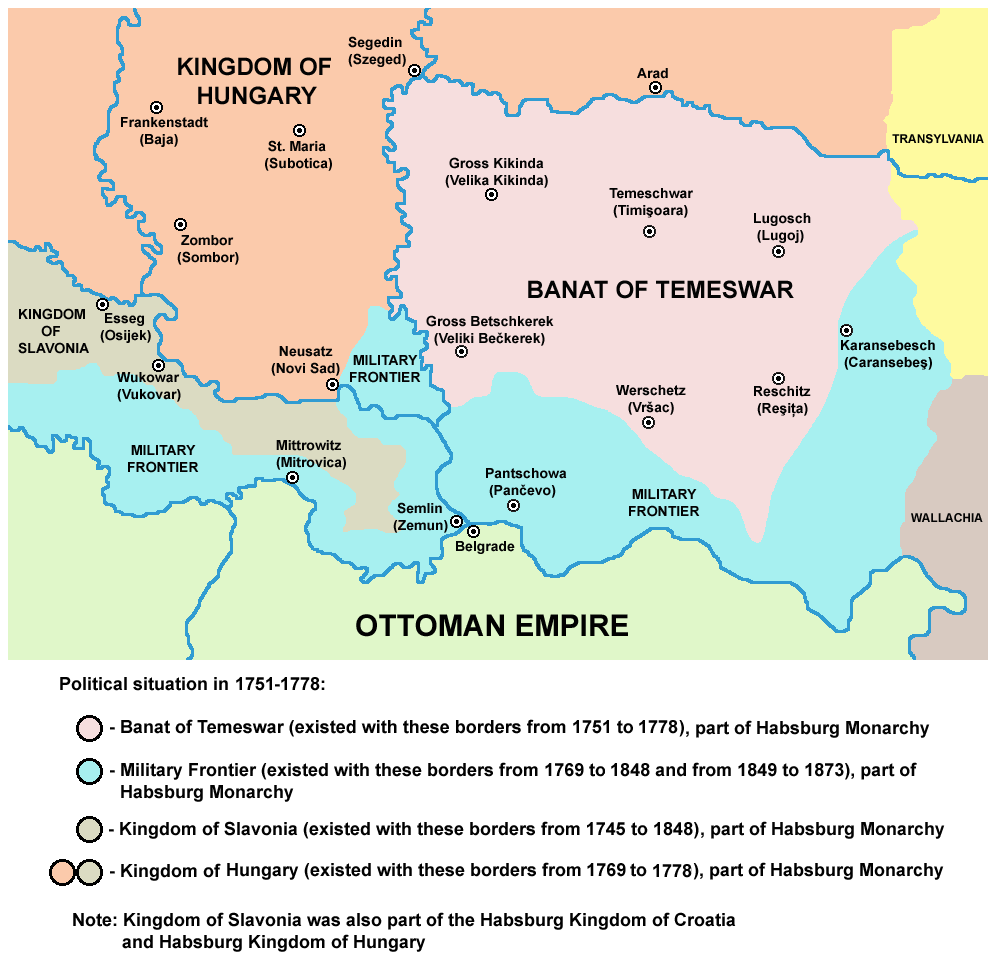
Map of Military Frontier sections in Syrmia, Bačka, and Banat in 1751-1873

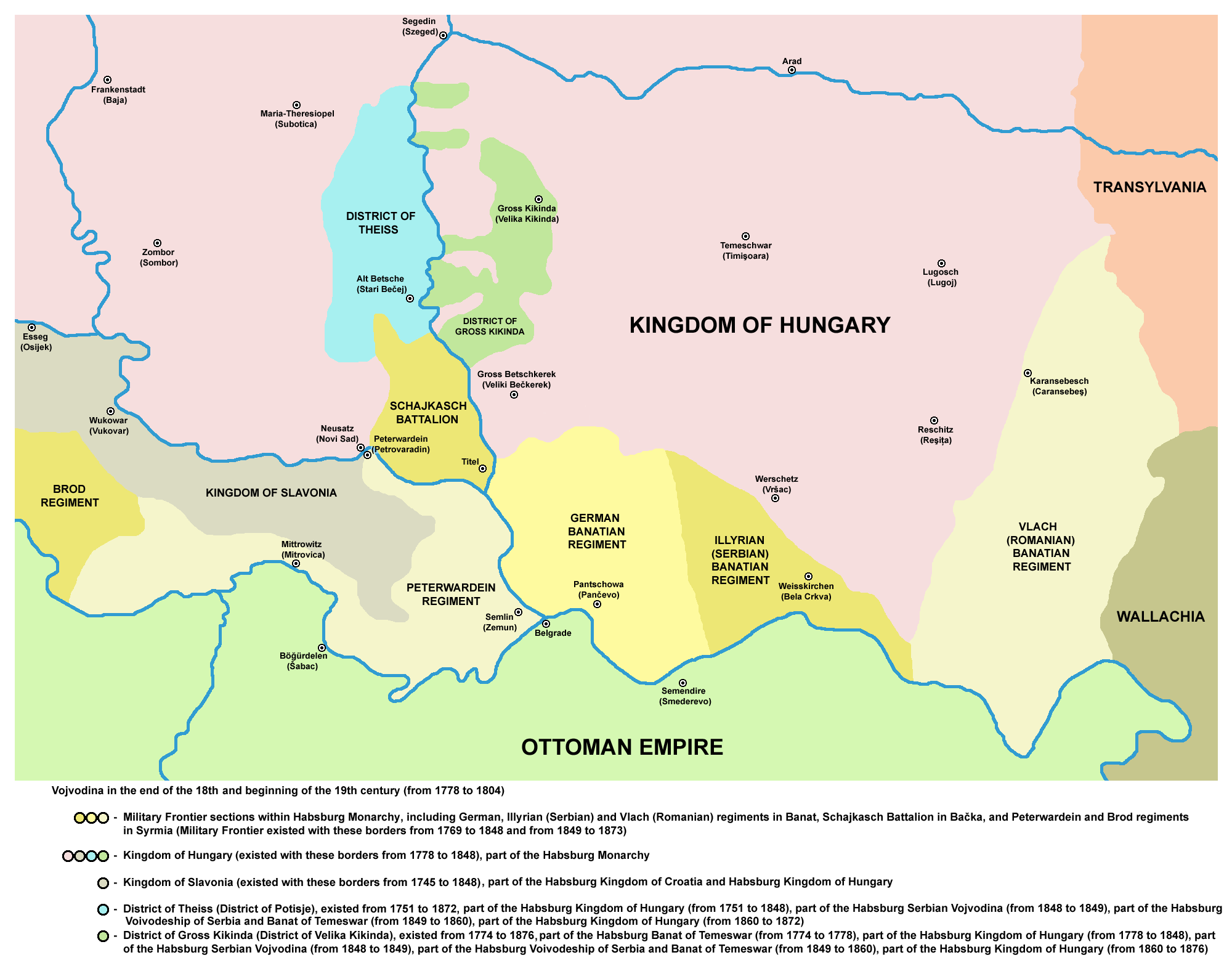
Map of Military Frontier sections in Banat, Syrmia, and Bačka (18th-19th century)

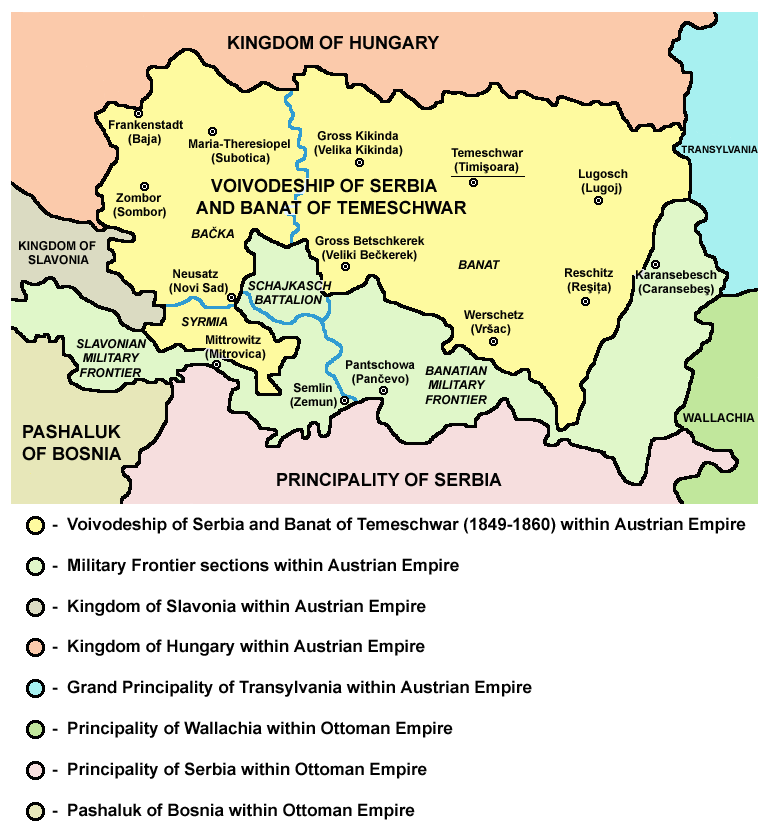
Map of Military Frontier sections in Banat, Syrmia, and Bačka in 1849 - Banatian and Slavonian military frontier and Schajkasch Battalion

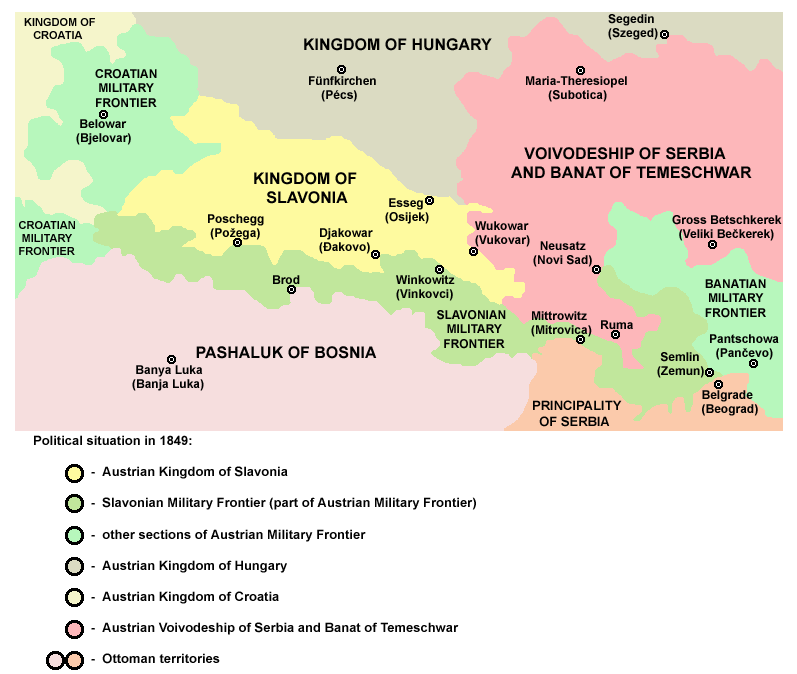
Map of the Slavonian Military Frontier in 1849

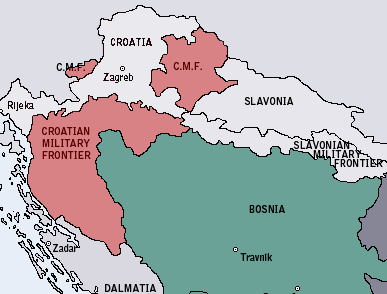
Map of the Croatian Military Frontier in 1868

== Demographics ==
=== 1828 ===
In 1828 the population included:

- 543,154 (50.60%) Eastern Orthodox
- 434,344 (40.46%) Roman Catholics
- 53,073 (4.95%) Greek Catholics
- 42,659 (3.98%) Protestants
- 450 (0.05%) Jews

=== 1846 ===
An Austrian statistical yearbook for 1846 notes that 1,226,408 residents lived in the Military Frontier:

- 598,603 (48.82%) Eastern Orthodox
- 514,545 (41.96%) Roman Catholics
- 62,743 (5.12%) Greek Catholics
- 49,980 (4.08%) Protestants
- 537 (0.05%) Jews

=== 1857 ===
The first modern population census in the Austrian Empire was conducted in 1857 and recorded the population's religion. The population of the Military Frontier numbered 1,062,072 inhabitants, while the religious structure of the Military Frontier was:

- 587,269 (55.30%) Eastern Orthodox
- 448,703 (42.26%) Roman Catholics
- 20,139 (1.91%) Protestants
- 5,533 (0.53%) Greek Catholics
- 404 (0.05%) Jews

Population data by divisions:

Croatian-Slavonian Military Frontier (Total 675,817)

- 396,843 (58.72%) Roman Catholics
- 272,755 (40.36%) Eastern Orthodox
- 5,486 (0.81%) Greek Catholics
- 733 (0.11%) others

Banat Military Frontier (Total 386,255)

- 314,514 (81.43%) Eastern Orthodox
- 51,860 (13.43%) Roman Catholics
- 19,418 (5.03%) Evangelicals
- 393 (0.1%) Jews
- 70 (0.01%) others

== Legacy ==
Many Serbs emigrated north into the southern regions of Hungary while Serbia was largely under Ottoman rule. To attract Serbs to Hungary, Emperor Leopold I decreed that they could elect their own ruler, or Vojvoda, from which the name Vojvodina derives. In 1690, about 30,000 to 70,000 Serbs settled eastern Slavonia, Bačka and Banat in what became known as the Great Serbian Migrations. Later, the Habsburgs did not allow Serbs to elect their own vojvoda; they incorporated the region into the military frontiers of eastern Slavonia and the Banat. However, the strong Serb presence in the region made Vojvodina the cradle of the Serbian renaissance during the 19th century.

From October 1990, eight months before Croatia declared independence (June 25, 1991) from Yugoslavia, the Serbs who lived in the region of the former Military Frontier (Vojna Krajina) started an insurrection and adopted the name (Krajina) for their unrecognised Republic of Serbian Krajina. The occupied territory was largely identical to that of the Military Frontier, but also included some territories that were never part of the former Military Frontier, such as northern Dalmatia, including the town of Knin. Other territories that had constituted the Military Frontier remained under the control of the Republic of Croatia. Croatian forces regained control over Serb-occupied territories after Operation Storm in 1995.

== See also ==
- Grenz infantry
- March (territory)
- Buffer zone
- Hundred Years' Croatian–Ottoman War
- List of rebellions in the Habsburg monarchy

== Sources ==
- Fine, John Van Antwerp Jr. (1994) [1987]. The Late Medieval Balkans: A Critical Survey from the Late Twelfth Century to the Ottoman Conquest. Ann Arbor, Michigan: University of Michigan Press. ISBN 0472082604.
- Fine, John Van Antwerp Jr. (2005). When Ethnicity Did Not Matter in the Balkans: A Study of Identity in Pre-Nationalist Croatia, Dalmatia, and Slavonia in the Medieval and Early-Modern Periods. Ann Arbor, Michigan: University of Michigan Press. ISBN 0472025600.
- Horvat, Rudolf (1906). Najnovije doba hrvatske povjesti [The latest era of Croatian history] (in Croatian). Matica hrvatska. (Wikisource)
- Valentic, Mirko (1978). Vojna Krajina u austrijskoj politici 1849-1860 [Military Border in Austrian politics in 1849-1860] (in Croatian).
- Bundesministerium für Inneres (1859). Statistische Übersichten Über Die Bevölkerung und Den Viehstand Von Österreich. Nach Der Zählung Vom 31. Oktober 1857 [Statistical surveys of the population and livestock of Austria. According to the census of October 31, 1857] (in German).
- Jelavich, Barbara (1983). History of the Balkans: Eighteenth and Nineteenth Centuries. Vol. 1. Cambridge University Press. ISBN 9780521252492.
- Kulauzov, Maša (2008). "The emergence, development and demilitarization of the military border of the Austrian Monarchy" (in Serbian). Matica srpska.
- Miller, Nicholas J. (1997). Between Nation and State: Serbian Politics in Croatia Before the First World War. Pittsburgh: University of Pittsburgh Press. ISBN 9780822939894.
- Pálffy, Géza (2012). "The Habsburg Defense System in Hungary Against the Ottomans in the Sixteenth Century: A Catalyst of Military Development in Central Europe". In Davies, Brian (ed.). Warfare in Eastern Europe, 1500-1800. Brill Publishers. ISBN 9789004221987.
- Štefanec, Nataša (2011). Država ili ne. Ustroj Vojne krajine 1578. godine i hrvatsko-slavonski staleži u regionalnoj obrani i politici [State or Not. Organization of the Military Border in 1578 and Croatian-Slavonian Estates in Regional Defense and Politics] (in Croatian). Zagreb: Srednja Europa. ISBN 978-953-6979-73-8.

== Bibliography ==
- Dabić, Vojin S. (1992). "Wanderungen der Serben nach Kroatien und Slawonien vom Anfang des XVI bis Ende des XVII Jahrhunderts". Историјски часопис. 38 (1991): 43–76.
- Dabić, Vojin S. (2011). "The Habsburg-Ottoman War of 1716-1718 and Demographic Changes in the War-Afflicted Territories". The Peace of Passarowitz, 1718. West Lafayette: Purdue University Press. pp. 191–208. ISBN 9781557535948.
- Fodor, Pál; Dávid, Géza, eds. (2000). Ottomans, Hungarians, and Habsburgs in Central Europe: The Military Confines in the Era of Ottoman Conquest. BRILL. ISBN 9004119078.
- Ilić-Mandić, Jelena (2021). "Forging the Wallachian Military Border, 1769-1772" (PDF). Banatica. 31 (2): 251–273.
- Ilić-Mandić, Jelena (2022b). "The Military Frontier and Emigration Challenges in the 18th Century" (PDF). Migrations in the Slavic Cultural Space From the Middle Ages to the Present Day. Lódź: Wydawnictwo Universytetu Lódzkiego. pp. 45–62.
- Dragutin Pavličević (1984). Vojna krajina: povijesni pregled, historiografija, rasprave. Sveučilišna naklada Liber.
- Vaníček, Fr (1875). Specialgeschichte der Militärgrenze: aus Originalquellen und Quellenwerken geschöpft. Aus der Kaiserlich-Königlichen Hof- und Staatsdruckerei.
- Walter Berger: Baut dem Reich einen Wall. Das Buch vom Entstehen der Militärgrenze wider die Türken. Leopold Stocker Verlag, 1979 ISBN 3-7020-0342-8
- Jakob Amstadt: Die k.k. Militaergrenze 1522 – 1881 (mit einer Gesamtbibliographie). Dissertation, University of Würzburg, 1969
- Heeresgeschichtliches Museum (Hrsg.): Die k. k. Militärgrenze (Beiträge zu ihrer Geschichte). ÖBV, 1973 (Schriften des Heeresgeschichtlichen Museums, 6) ISBN 3-215-73302-1
- Mirko Valentić: Vojna krajina i pitanje njezina sjedinjenja s Hrvatskom 1849–1881, CHP, 1981, Zagreb
- Alexander Buczynski: Gradovi Vojne krajine 1–2, HIP, 1997, Zagreb
- Milan Kruhek: Krajiške utvrde Hrvatskog kraljevstva, HIP, 1995, Zagreb
- Potiska i pomoriška vojna granica (1702–1751), Muzej Vojvodine, Novi Sad, 2003.
