= Croatian Military Frontier =

Habsburg territory (1553–1881)

Croatian Military Frontier Kroatische Militärgrenze Hrvatska vojna granica Hrvatska vojna krajina Horvát határőrvidék
- District of the Military Frontier, Habsburg monarchy
- 1553–1881
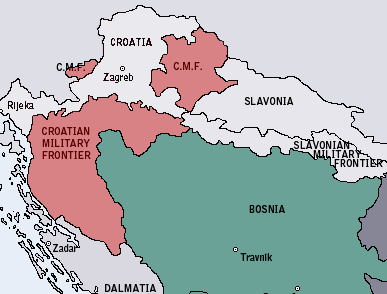
- Croatian Military Frontier in 1868
- Area
  - 1870: 14,903 km^{2} (5,754 sq mi)
- Population
  - 1870: 611,575
- History
  - Established: 1553
  - Disestablished: 15 July 1881
Preceded by	Succeeded by
Kingdom of Croatia (Habsburg); Ottoman Empire	Kingdom of Croatia-Slavonia
- Today part of: Croatia

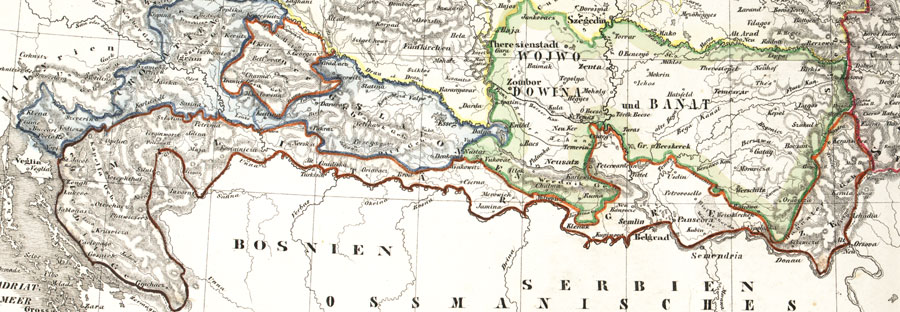
Military Frontier.

The Croatian Military Frontier (Croatian: Hrvatska vojna krajina or Hrvatska vojna granica) was a district of the Military Frontier, a territory in the Habsburg monarchy, first during the period of the Austrian Empire and then during Austria-Hungary.

== History ==
Founded in the late 16th century out of lands of the Habsburg Kingdom of Croatia, it was initially a nominal part of that Kingdom, to be transferred in 1627 to direct imperial rule as part of the Military Frontier. The Frontier was located on the border with the Ottoman Empire. In the Frontier zone, the king-emperors promised free land and freedom of religion to people who came to the area with the majority of the population being Serbs and Vlachs. In exchange, the people who lived in the area had an obligation to fight for the Empire, and to protect the land. In 1630 Emperor Ferdinand II enacted the Statuta Valachorum laws. It was known that the soldiers had to fulfill military service between the ages of 16 and 66. At the end of the 17th century, Habsburg Kingdom of Croatia expanded its borders so the territory of the Croatian Military Frontier was also expanded to include some former Ottoman territories in the east. In 1783 it was placed under the unified control of the Croatian General Command headquartered in Zagreb. The Military Frontier was demilitarized on 8 August 1873. The Croatian Military Frontier existed until 15 July 1881, when it was abolished and incorporated into the Kingdom of Croatia-Slavonia (like the Slavonian one).

== Geography ==
This part of the Military Frontier included the geographic regions of Lika, Kordun, Banovina and bordered the Adriatic Sea to the west, Venetian Republic to the south, Habsburg Kingdom of Croatia to the north-west, the Ottoman Empire to the south-east, Habsburg Kingdom of Slavonia to the east, and Habsburg Kingdom of Hungary to the north.

It extended onto the Slavonian Military Frontier near the confluence of the Una river into the Sava. Like the rest of the Military Frontier, it ceased to exist as a political entity in the late 19th century.

== Sections ==
Croatian Military Frontier included three General Command (Croatian: Generalat) sections which were divided into eight Regiments:

- Varaždin General Command
  - Križevci Regiment N°V
  - Đurđevac Regiment N°VI
- Karlovac General Command
  - Lika Regiment N°I
  - Otočac Regiment N°II
  - Ogulin Regiment N°III
  - Slunj Regiment N°IV
- Zagreb General Command
  - Glina Regiment N°X
  - Petrinja Regiment N°XI

== Demographics ==
In 1802, the estimated population consisted of:

- 195,300 Roman Catholics
- 180,800 Orthodox Christians

In 1820, estimated population of Croatian Military Frontier included:

- 207,747 Catholics
- 198,728 Orthodox Christians

According to Hungarian statistician Elek Fényes, in 1840 the Croatian Military Frontier was populated by 498,947 people and the ethnic structure was:

- 258,454 Croats
- 240,493 Serbs

The first modern census from 1857 recorded the religion of the populace of Croatian Military Frontier:

- 285,344 Roman Catholics
- 253,429 Orthodox Christians
- 5,433 Eastern Catholics

74.8% of the active population in Croatian-Slavonian Military Frontier were employed in agriculture, 18.63% were inactive soldiers, while 3.11% were working in industry.

== See also ==
- Slavonian Military Frontier
- Banat Military Frontier
- Kingdom of Croatia (Habsburg)
- Kingdom of Croatia-Slavonia
- Hundred Years' Croatian–Ottoman War
