= Warasdiner Generalat =

The Warasdiner Generalat (in German, known as English Varaždin Generalate, Serbo-Croatian: Varaždinski generalat), also known as the Windische Grenze ("Slavic Border") in German, was a province of the Military Frontier of the Habsburg monarchy (later the Austrian Empire and briefly Austria-Hungary), that existed between 1531 and the 19th century. While the Generalate was originally based in Warasdin (Varaždin), Varaždin County, including the city, was removed from the Military Frontier in the 18th century; the district the Generalate controlled was thereafter centered on Bellowar (Bjelovar), which also briefly acted as its administrative center until it was moved to Zagreb in 1787.

== History ==
The border command was established by Ferdinand I, Holy Roman Emperor in 1531. By the 1560s the Habsburgs established a frontier defense system, made up of six main Grenzgeneralat (captain-generalcies) in the Military Frontier in Hungary and Croatia, each commanded by captain generals; the one centered in Varaždin was after 1578 known as the Wendish-Bajcsavár captain-generalcy. Until the Long Turkish War, the Military Frontier's defense system had two centers, Karlovac and Varaždin. During the war, the area around the generalate was deserted.

The Statuta Valachorum (1630), a decree of privileges to the Orthodox and some Greek Catholic Vlachs and (Serb) refugee community, was in effect in the generalate. A rebellion broke out in the generalate in 1632, the troops later known as the Frontiersmen (Grenzer) rose up against local Austrian governors; the rebellion was suppressed, and knez (count) Marko Bogdanović and harambaša Smiljan Vujica (or Smoljan Vujić) were executed. A rebellion broke out in the generalate in 1665–66 when Frontiersmen under Stefan Osmokruhović rose up against the Austrian officers, after the rights of the frontiersmen had been compromised.

In 1737 the Military Frontier was re-organized, and the Varaždin general command included the two regiments of Križevci and Đurđevac. The area was ceded to the Habsburg Kingdom of Croatia-Slavonia in 1871 and by 1886 its territory had become the bulk of Bjelovar-Križevci County.

== Commanders ==
- "Oberst der Windischen Grenze", fl. 1616
- Sigmund Friedrich von Trauttmansdorf, "Oberst der Windischen Grenze", fl. 1626
