= Hrvatski vojnik =

- Editor-in-chief: Željko Stipanović
- Categories: Military magazine
- Frequency: Weekly
- Circulation: 3,000
- Publisher: Croatian Ministry of Defense
- First issue: November 1991
- Country: Croatia
- Based in: Zagreb
- Language: Croatian
- Website: www.hrvatski-vojnik.hr
- ISSN: 1333-9036

Hrvatski vojnik (English: Croatian Soldier) is a Croatian military magazine published by the Croatian Ministry of Defense. Established in 1991 and billed as the "first Croatian military journal", the magazine regularly features articles on recent developments in military technology, military history, as well as news about the Croatian Armed Forces' activities at home and abroad.

The magazine underwent several changes in format and frequency throughout its existence. Originally launched as a biweekly newsletter in November 1991, it was published in that form throughout the Croatian War of Independence (1991–1995). In the closing months of the war, in May 1995, Hrvatski vojnik was re-launched as a monthly military journal published alongside the ministry's new weekly newsletter titled Velebit (named after the eponymous mountain range).

In 2000 Velebit was renamed Obrana (English: Defense) and both publications underwent major changes in design and content, with a number of new sections introduced. In October 2004 Obrana was merged back into Hrvatski vojnik, which then continued to be published weekly.

Since 2001 Hrvatski vojnik has been a member of the European Military Press Association.
