= Slavonian Military Frontier =

Habsburg border region (1745–1881)

Slavonian Military Frontier Slawonische Militärgrenze Szlavón határőrvidék Slavonska vojna granica Slavonska vojna krajina Славонска војна крајина
- District of the Military Frontier, Habsburg monarchy
- 1745–1881
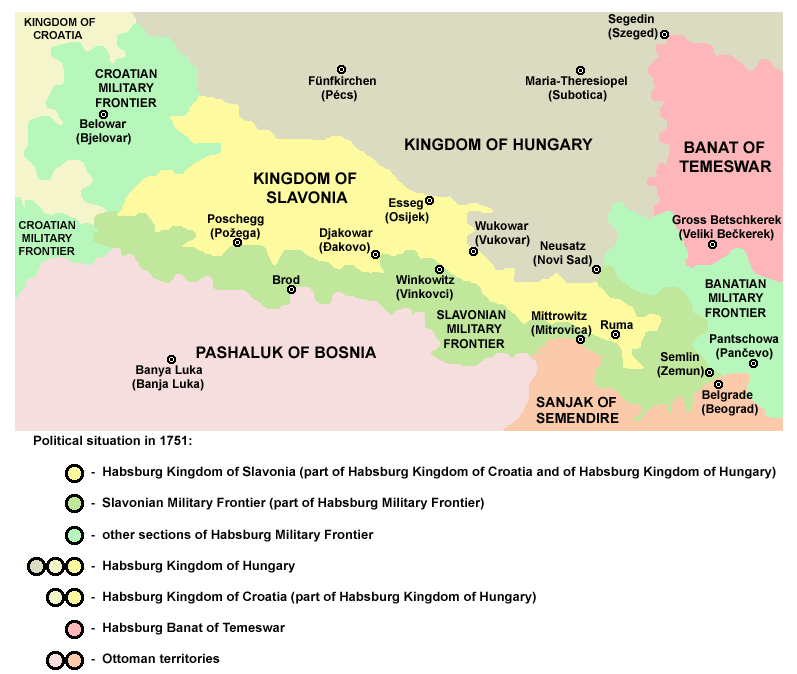
- Slavonian Military Frontier in 1751
- Population
  - 1870: 246,901
- History
  - Established: 1745
  - Disestablished: 15 July 1881
| Preceded by | Succeeded by |
| Ottoman Empire | Kingdom of Croatia-Slavonia |
- Today part of: Croatia; Serbia

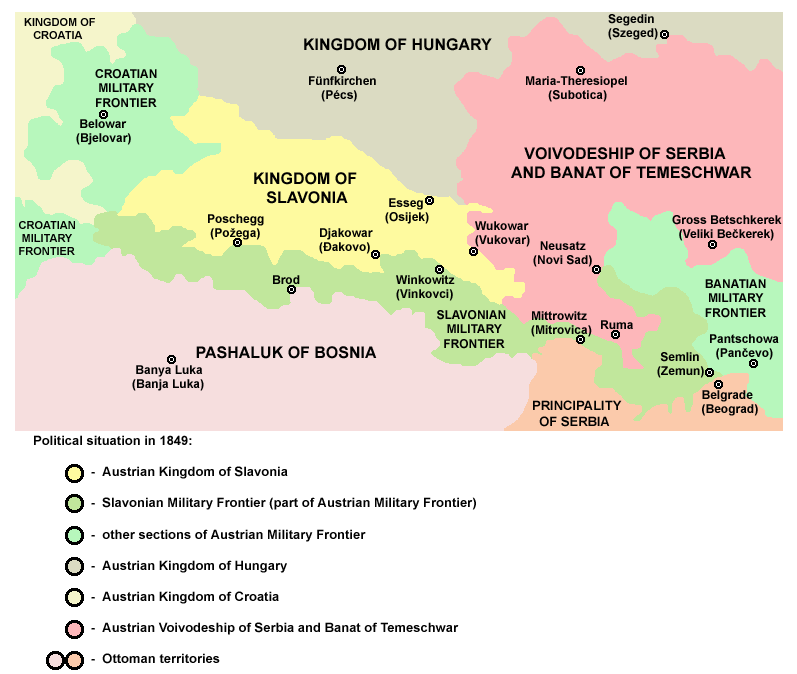
Slavonian Military Frontier in 1849

The Slavonian Military Frontier (Croatian: Slavonska vojna krajina or Slavonska vojna granica; Serbian: Славонска војна крајина; German: Slawonische Militärgrenze; Hungarian: Szlavón határőrvidék) was a district of the Military Frontier, a territory in the Habsburg monarchy, first during the period of the Austrian Empire and then during the Austro-Hungarian Monarchy. It was formed out of territories the Habsburgs conquered from the Ottoman Empire and included southern parts of Slavonia and Syrmia; today the area it covered is mostly in eastern Croatia, with its easternmost parts in northern Serbia (mostly in Vojvodina region.)

== Divisions ==
The Slavonian Military Frontier was divided between three regiments: Regiment N°VII, based at Vinkovci; Regiment N°VIII, based at Nova Gradiška and Regiment N°IX, based at Petrovaradin.

Other important towns in the area included Sremski Karlovci, Stara Pazova, Zemun, and Sremska Mitrovica.

== History ==
During History, the name Slavonian Military Frontier referred to different territories. It was first located in what is now Central Croatia and was known as the Varaždin generalat. It was created from territories that had been part of medieval Banovina of Slavonia. Shortly after its creation in the 16th century, original Slavonian Military Frontier bordered the Ottoman Empire to the east, the Habsburg Kingdom of Croatia (part of the Habsburg monarchy) to the west, the Croatian Military Frontier to the south-west, and the Habsburg Kingdom of Hungary, also part of the Habsburg Empire, to the north.

After the Treaty of Karlowitz (1699), Habsburg monarchy expanded its territory towards east and new sections of the Military Frontier were founded along the Sava, Danube, Tisa and Mureş rivers. New parts of the frontier were divided into two generalats: the first one included territory from Gradiška to river Tisa and the second one included territories along the Tisa and Mureş rivers. Until the middle of the 18th century, the entire Slavonia region was under military administration. In 1745, northern parts of Slavonia were placed under civil administration and were organized into the newly formed Habsburg crownland known as the Kingdom of Slavonia. The southern parts of Slavonia that remained under military administration were organized into Slavonian Military Frontier, while former original Slavonian Military Frontier was organized as Varaždin section of the Croatian Military Frontier.

In the second half of the 18th century, the Slavonian Military Frontier bordered the Habsburg Kingdom of Croatia and the Croatian Military Frontier to the west, the Habsburg Kingdom of Slavonia and the Habsburg Kingdom of Hungary to the north, the Banat Military Frontier to the east and the Ottoman province of Bosnia and Sanjak of Smederevo to the south. In 1783 it was placed under the unified control of the Croatian General Command (German: Kroatisches General-Commando) headquartered in Zagreb. The only changes of this province's borders and neighborhood before its integration into Kingdom of Croatia-Slavonia in 1881 were in 1848–1849 when autonomous Serbian Vojvodina included eastern parts of Slavonian Military Frontier and between 1849 and 1860, during the existence of Voivodeship of Serbia and Banat of Temeschwar, a separate Habsburg crownland which became a north-eastern neighbor of Slavonian Military Frontier. After the creation of the Principality of Serbia in 1815, this was their southeastern neighbor.

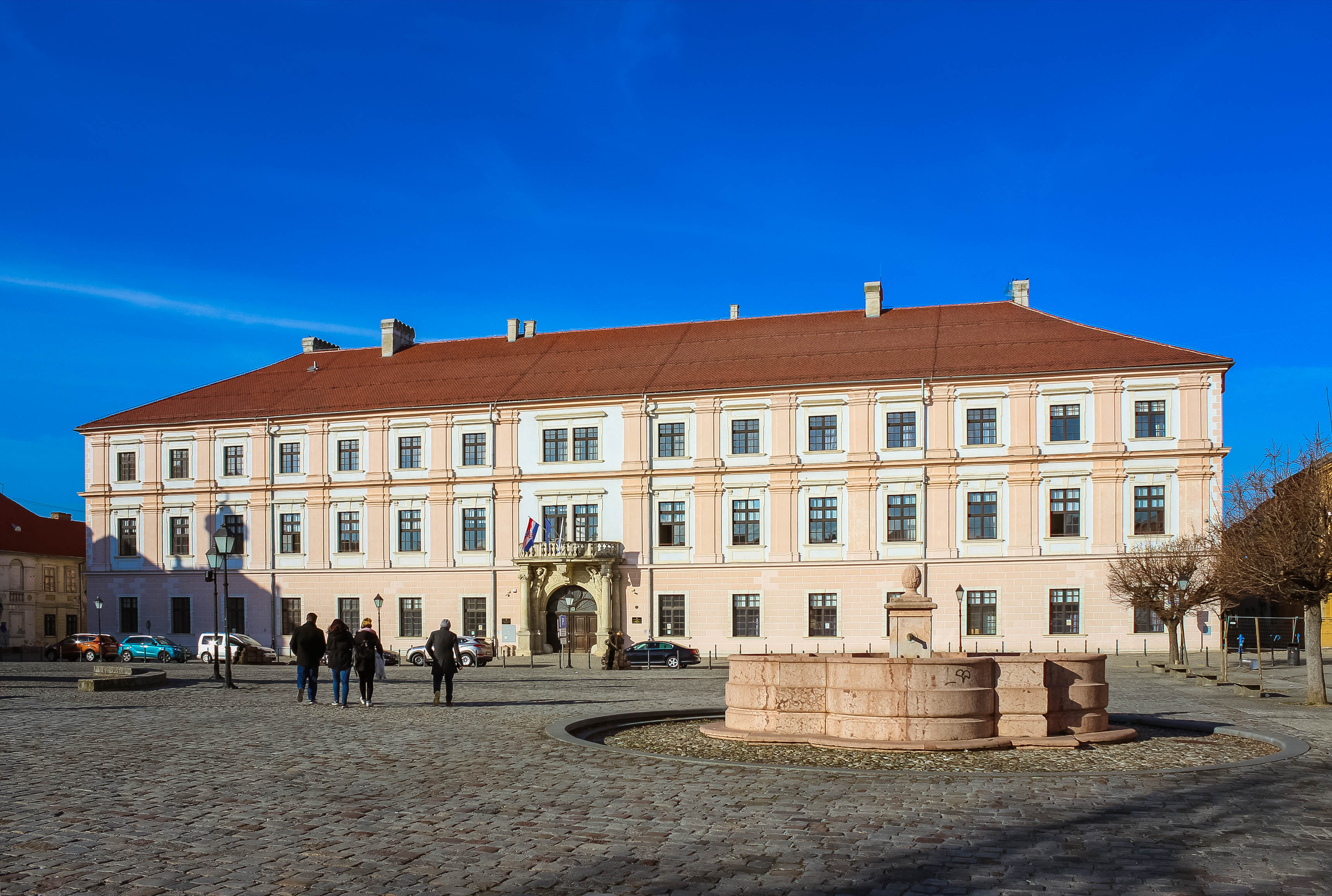
Palace of Slavonian General Command in Osijek

== Population and demographics ==
=== 1776 ===
In 1776, the rural population of the Slavonian military frontier was 177,212. The number of Roman Catholic men was 43,635, while number of Orthodox men was 33,970. The number of inhabitants of cities was 11,353, and that giving a total of 188,565 inhabitants.

In Brod and Gradiška regiments Catholics outnumbered the minority Orthodox, and in Petrovaradin regiment the Orthodox were more numerous.

=== 1820 ===
In 1820, population of Slavonian Military Frontier included 117,933 Catholics and 117,274 Orthodox Christians.

=== 1870 ===
In 1870, Slavonian military frontier had, according to official census, 246,901 inhabitants. Of that number 143,873 were Roman Catholic and 92,991 were Orthodox (living mainly in eastern Syrmia). Brod regiment had 82,540 inhabitants out of which 73,892 were Roman Catholic and 6,886 were Orthodox. Gradiška regiment had 61,596 inhabitants out of which 45,601 were Roman Catholic and 15,933 were Orthodox. Petrovaradin regiment had 102,765 inhabitants out of which 70,172 were Orthodox and 24,380 were Roman Catholic.

== Sources ==
- Mladen Lorković, Narod i zemlja Hrvata, reprint, Split, 2005.

== See also ==
- The Brod Fortress
- Croatian Military Frontier
- Kingdom of Slavonia
- Kingdom of Croatia-Slavonia
- List of rebellions in the Habsburg monarchy

== Literature ==
- Taube, Friedrich Wilhelm von (1777). Historische und geographische Beschreibung des Königreiches Slavonien und des Herzogthumes Syrmien. Vol. 1. Leipzig.
- Taube, Friedrich Wilhelm von (1777). Historische und geographische Beschreibung des Königreiches Slavonien und des Herzogthumes Syrmien. Vol. 2. Leipzig.
- Taube, Friedrich Wilhelm von (1778). Historische und geographische Beschreibung des Königreiches Slavonien und des Herzogthumes Syrmien. Vol. 3. Leipzig.
