= List of Serbs in the Habsburg monarchy =

List of Serbs in the Habsburg monarchy encompasses prominent Serbs in the Habsburg Monarchy, also including the Austrian Empire, and the Austro-Hungarian Monarchy, from 1526 to 1918. In political terminology of the Habsburg Monarchy, the Serbs were also known as "Rascians".

== Nobility and military personnel ==
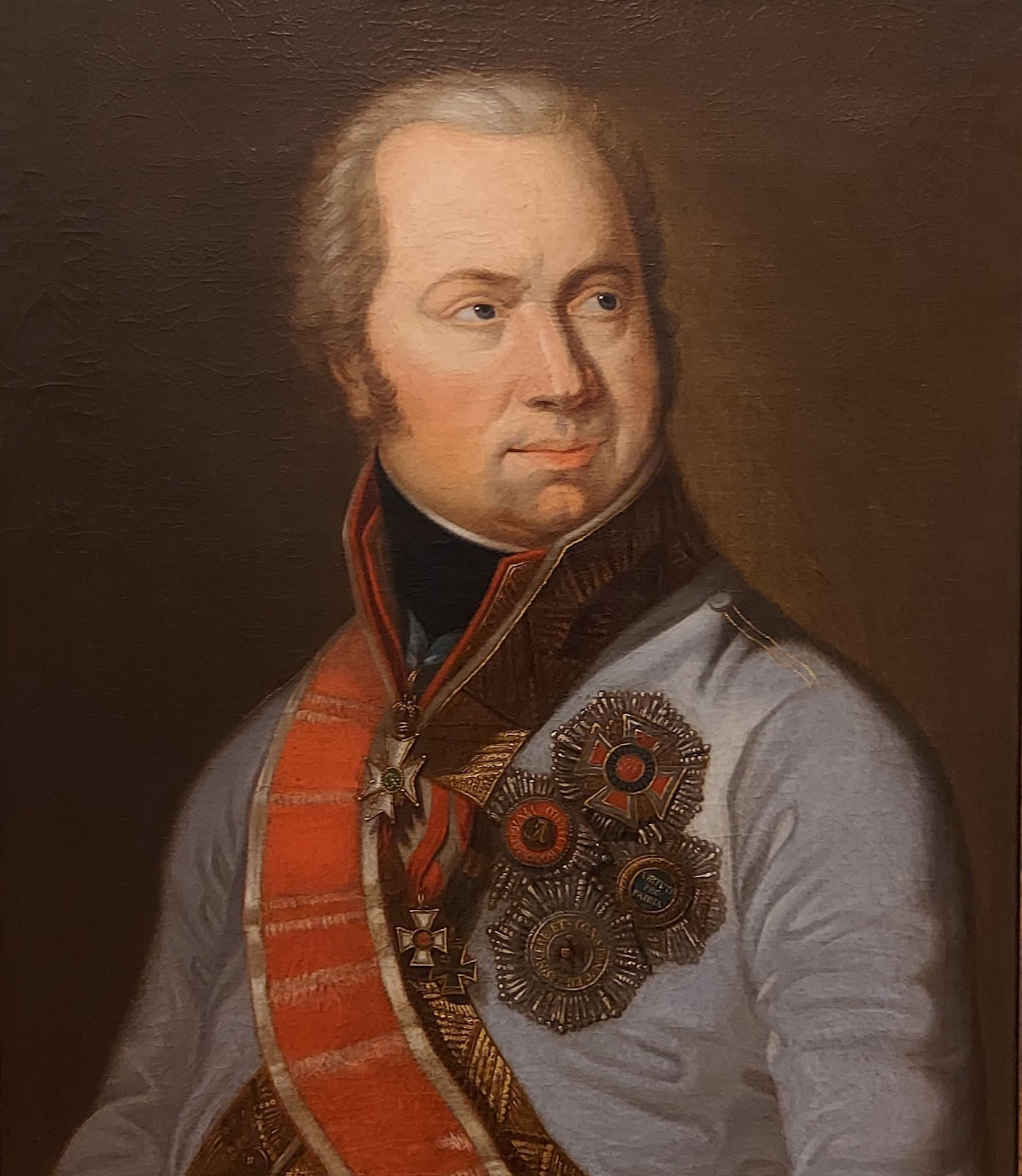
Peter Duka von Kadar

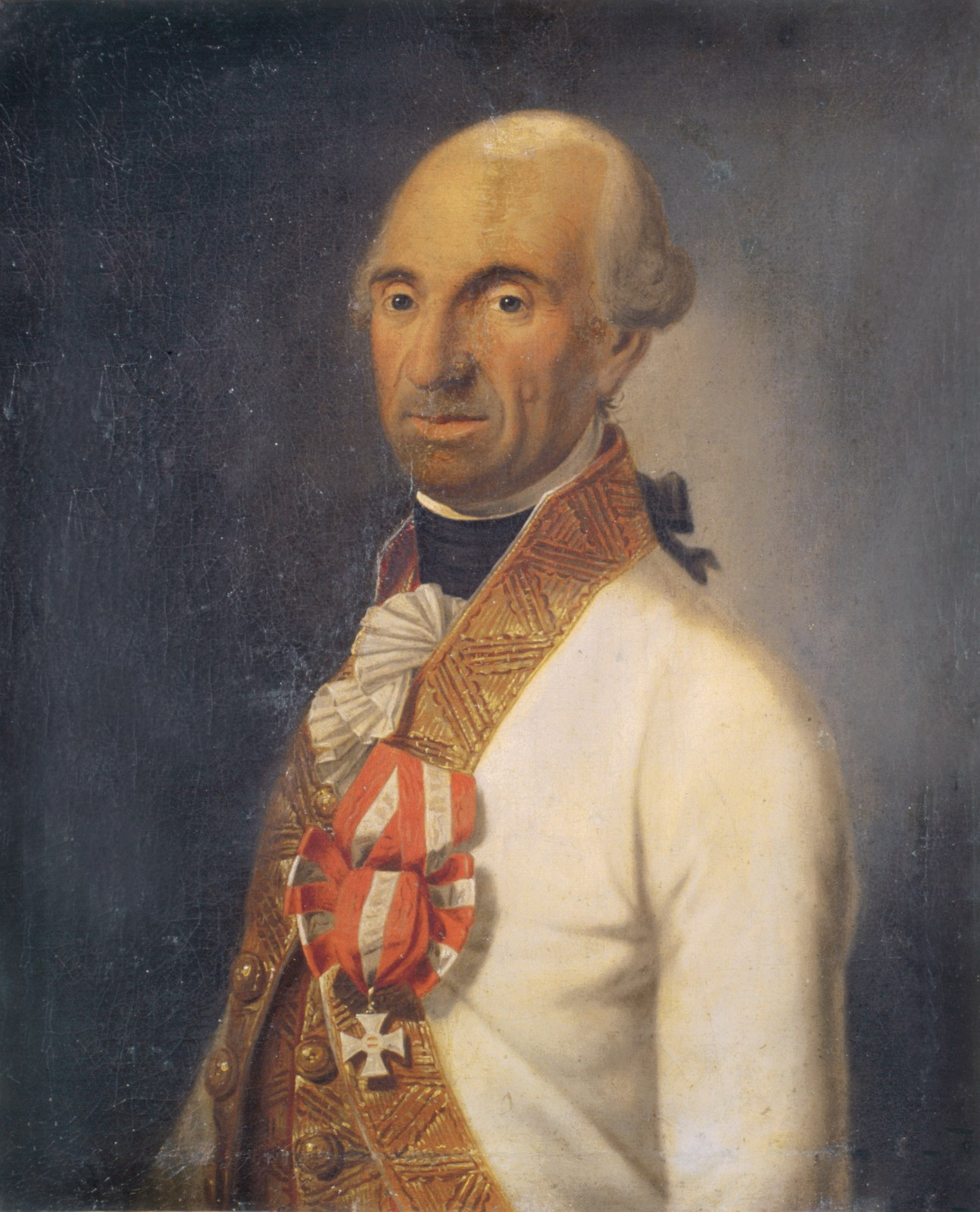
Jeronim Ljubibratić

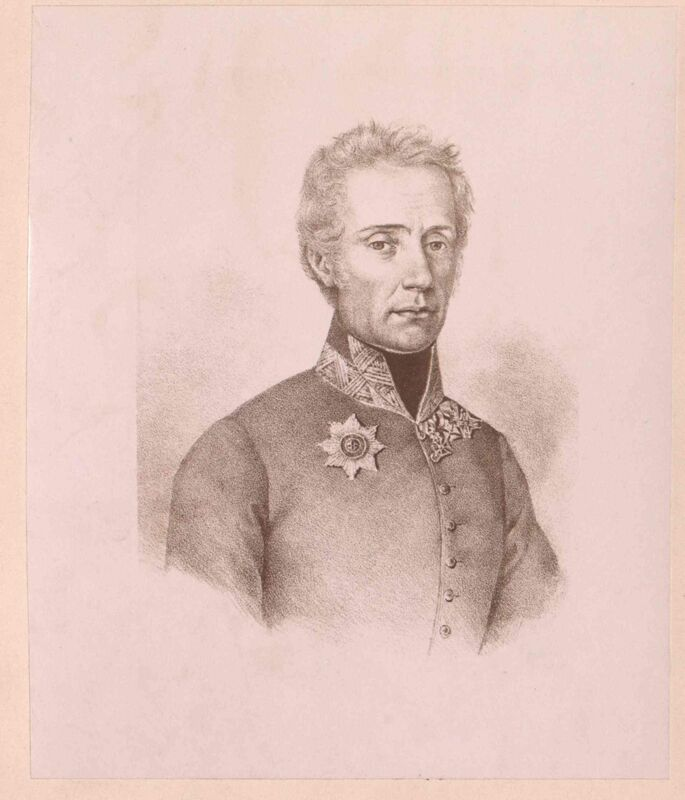
Demeter Radossevich von Rados

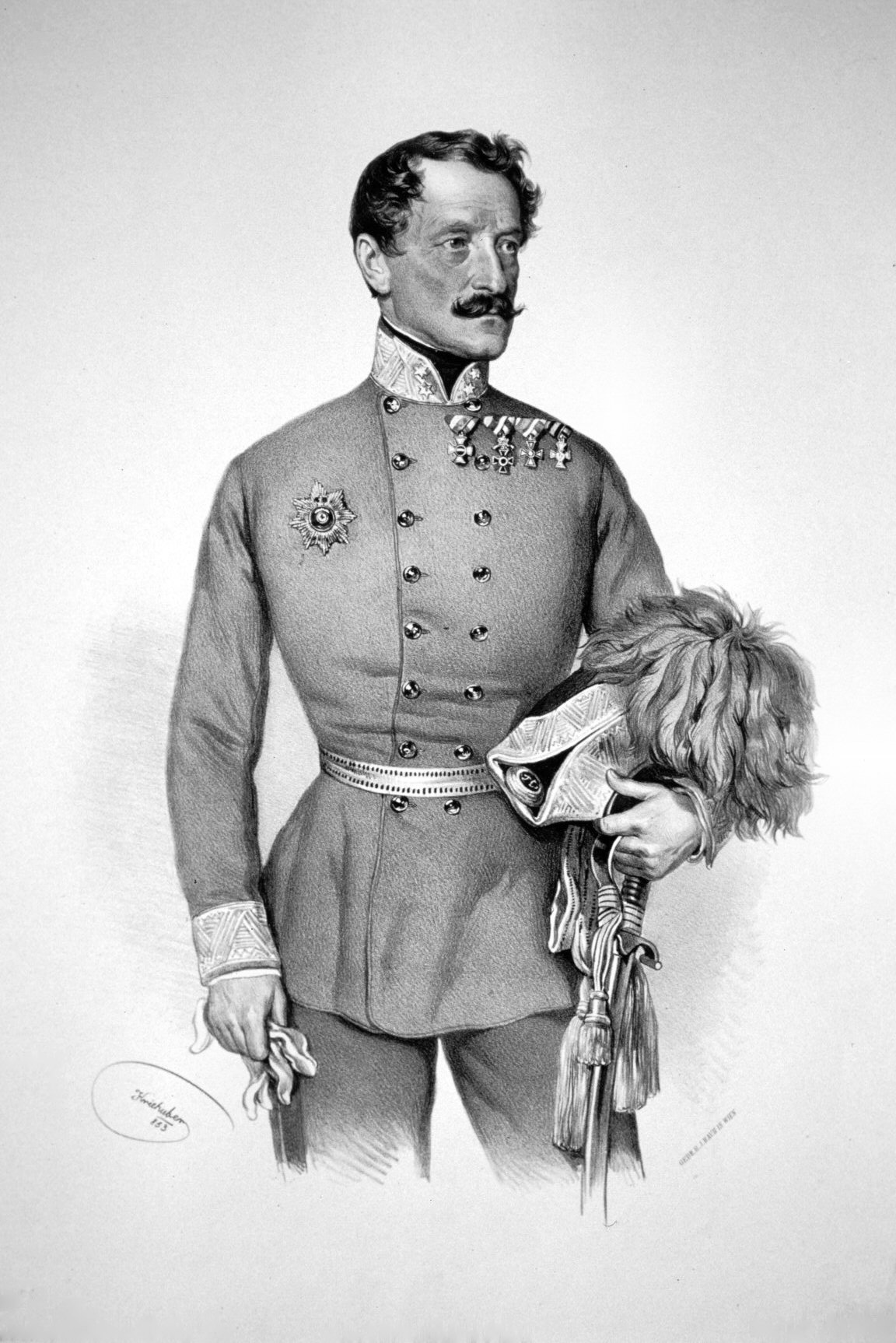
Lazar Mamula

- Crepović noble family
- Radič Božić
- Stjepan Berislavić
- Ivaniš Berislavić
- Miloš Belmužević
- Đorđe Branković
- Jovan Branković
- Jovan Nenad
- Pavle Bakić
- Radoslav Čelnik
- Jakšić noble family
- Vuk Grgurević
- Petar Ovčarević
- Mihailo Ovčarević
- Dimitrije Ovčarević
- Stefan Osmokruhović
- Petar Ljubojević
- Staniša Marković-Mlatišuma
- Bogić Vučković
- Arsenije Loma
- Demeter Radossevich von Rados
- Anton Csorich
- Gabriel Rodić
- Adam Bajalics von Bajahaza
- Andreas Karaczay (1744–1808), Austrian Field Marshal
- Petar Ovčarević (fl. 1521–41), commander
- Mihailo Ovčarević (fl. 1550–79), commander
- Dimitrije Ovčarević (fl. 1552–66), commander
- Jovan Ovčarević (fl. 1557), deputy
- Péter Petrovics (1486–1557), magnate
- Nikola Crepović (fl. 1542–58), magnate
- Deli-Marko (fl. 1596)
- Starina Novak (fl. 1596)
- Jovan Tekelija (1660–1721/22), commander of the Serbian Militia, ennobled by Joseph I
- Stefan Osmokruhović (fl. 1665–d. 1666), rebel leader
- Jovan Monasterlija (fl. 1683–1706), general, Serbian Militia
- Antonije Znorić (fl. 1688–d. 1695), Austrian colonel, Serbian Militia
- Pera Segedinac (1655–1736), captain
- Vuk Isakovič (1696–1759), Serbian Militia commander
- Đorđe Sečujac (fl. 1715–59), Austrian captain (active 1715–59)
- Mihajlo Mikašinović (1715–1774), Austrian Field Marshal
- Jovan Albanez (fl. 1711–27), Russian colonel
- Bogić Vučković (fl. 1735–45), a rebel leader in Austrian service
- Peter Tersich von Cadesich (1739–1806), Austrian general
- Ignaz Stojanich (1741–1807), Austrian general
- Mihailo Mihaljević (1748-1794), Austrian colonel
- Jovan Šević (d. c. 1764), Austrian and Russian general
- Jeronim Ljubibratić (1716–1779), Austrian general
- Vuča Žikić (fl. 1788–d. 1808), Austrian soldier and Serbian Revolutionary
- Arsenije Sečujac (1720–1814), Austrian general (active 1741–83)
- Paul Davidovich (1737-1814), Austrian Lieutenant general
- Andreas von Stoichevich (1751–1810), Austrian Lieutenant Field Marshal
- Aron Stanisavljević von Wellenstreit (1753–1833), Austrian Lieutenant Field Marshal
- Petar Ljubojević (fl. 1754–55), rebel leader
- Sebastian Prodanovich (1755–1822), Austrian Lieutenant Field Marshal
- Josef Philipp Vukassovich (1755-1809), Austrian Lieutenant general
- Paul von Radivojevich (1759-1829), Austrian Lieutenant general
- Emmerich Blagoevich (1784–1850), Austrian Lieutenant Field Marshal
- Kuzman Todorović (1787–1858), Austrian Lieutenant general
- Lazar Mamula (1795–1878), Austrian general and Governor of Dalmatia
- Gavrilo Rodić (1812-1890), Austrian Lieutenant general
- Joseph von Dedovich )1752–1827), Austrian general
- Martin von Dedovich (1756–1822), Austrian general
- Paul Dimich von Papilla (1722–1802), Austrian general
- Peter Duka von Kadar (1756–1822), Austrian general and privy councillor
- Sava Tekelija (1761–1842), nobleman and philanthropist
- Stanoje Glavaš (1763–1815), hajduk and Serbian Revolutionary
- Karađorđe (1768–1817), leader of the First Serbian Uprising
- János Damjanich (1804–1849), Austrian and Hungarian general
- Károly Knezić (1808–1849), Hungarian general, one of The 13 Martyrs of Arad
- Petar Čarnojević (1810–1892), Hungarian nobleman, Royal Commissioner and Grand Prefect of Tamis County
- Petar Preradović (1818–1872), Austrian general
- Josip Runjanin (1821–1878), Austrian military officer and composer
- Emanuel Cvjetićanin (1833–1919), Austro-Hungarian Field Marshal

== Clergy ==
- Teodor of Vršac (fl. 1594–96), bishop of Vršac, leader of Banat Uprising
- Arsenije III Čarnojević (1633–1706), exiled Serbian Patriarch
- Vikentije Jovanović (1689–1737), Metropolitan of Karlovci (1732–37)
- Pavle Nenadović (1703–1768), Metropolitan of Karlovci (1749–68)
- Dionisije Novaković (1705–1767), Bishop of Buda
- Teodor Komogovinski (d. 1788), martyr
- Mojsije Putnik (1728–1790), Metropolitan of Karlovci (1781–90)
- Stefan Stratimirović (1757–1836), Metropolitan of Karlovci (1790–1836)

== Politicians ==
- Đorđe Branković (1645–1711), Transylvanian diplomat and writer
- Dušan Popović (1877–1958), Serb member of Croatian parliament

== Other ==
- Teodor Kračun (1730–1781), painter
- Dimitrije Bačević (1734–1770), icon painter and muralist
- Nikola Nešković (1740–1789), painter
- Teodor Ilić Češljar (1746–1793), painter
- Pavel Đurković (1772–1830), painter
- Georgije Bakalović (1786–1843), painter
- Jovan Avakumović (1748–1810), poet
- Petar Blagojevich (d. 1725), and Arnold Paole (d. c. 1726), alleged vampires
- Gavril Stefanović Venclović (1670–1749), priest, writer, poet, orator, philosopher, and illuminator.
- Zaharije Orfelin (1726–1785), polymath
- Emanuilo Janković (1758–1792), writer, dramatist, philosopher, translator, and editor
- Jovan Rajić (1726–1801), writer, historian, traveller, and pedagogue, considered one of the greatest Serbian academics of the 18th century.
- Teodor Filipović (1778–1807), writer, jurist, and educator
- Jovan Muškatirović (1743–1809), writer, lawyer, and educator
- Dositej Obradović (1739–1811), author, philosopher, linguist, traveler, polyglot, and the first minister of education of Serbia
- Avram Miletić (1755–fl. 1826), merchant and songwriter
- Jovan Pačić (1771–1849), painter and poet
- Sava Petrović (1788-1857)
- Pavel Petrović (1818-1887)

== Families ==
- Bakić noble family
- Branković
- Ovčarević
- Preradović

== See also ==
- List of Serbs
- Rascians
- Ottoman Serbs
- Serbs of Vojvodina
- Serbs in Austria
- Serbs in Hungary
- Serbs of Romania
- Serbs in Croatia
- Serbs in Slovakia
- Serbs in Slovenia

== Bibliography ==
- Adler, Philip J. (1976). "Serbs, Magyars, and Staatsinteresse in Eighteenth Century Austria: A Study in the History of Habsburg Administration". Austrian History Yearbook. 12 (1): 116–147.
- Bataković, Dušan T., ed. (2005). Histoire du peuple serbe [History of the Serbian People] (in French). Lausanne: L’Age d’Homme.
- Ćirković, Sima (2004). The Serbs. Malden: Blackwell Publishing.
- Gavrilović, Slavko (1993). "Serbs in Hungary, Slavonia and Croatia in struggles against the Turks (15th–18th centuries)". Serbs in European Civilization. Belgrade: Nova, Serbian Academy of Sciences and Arts, Institute for Balkan Studies. pp. 41–54.
- Ilić-Mandić, Jelena (2025). "Collective Identity(ies) in the 18th-Century Military Frontier: A Study of the Serbian Case" (PDF). Concepts of Nationalism and Patriotism in Serbian Political Discourse: Medieval, Modern, Contemporary. Belgrade: Faculty of Philosophy. pp. 77–82.
- Krestić, Vasilije (1997). History of the Serbs in Croatia and Slavonia 1848–1914. Belgrade: BIGZ.
- Krestić, Vasilije (2015). "The Serbs in Hungary during the First World War". The Serbs and the First World War 1914-1918. Belgrade: Serbian Academy of Sciences and Arts. pp. 43–56.
- Krstić, Aleksandar R. (2025). "Between Serving the Holy Crown and Keeping Serbian Traditions – On the Identity of the Serbs in Hungary in the Second Half of the 15th and the First Half of the 16th Centuries" (PDF). Concepts of Nationalism and Patriotism in Serbian Political Discourse: Medieval, Modern, Contemporary. Belgrade: Faculty of Philosophy. pp. 65–70.
- Puzović, Predrag (2004). "Pavle Nenadović (1699–1768)". 100 most eminent Serbs. Belgrade: Princip. pp. 108–114.
- Simić, Vladimir (2025). "Religion, Dynasty and Enlightenment: Serbian Patriotism in the Habsburg Monarchy in the 18th Century" (PDF). Concepts of Nationalism and Patriotism in Serbian Political Discourse: Medieval, Modern, Contemporary. Belgrade: Faculty of Philosophy. pp. 88–91.
- Točanac-Radović, Isidora (2022). "The Great Migration of Serbs and the Question of the Serbian Ethnic and Religious Community in the Habsburg Monarchy". Migrations in the Slavic Cultural Space: From the Middle Ages to the Present Day. Łódź: Łódź University Press. pp. 15–27.
- Točanac-Radović, Isidora (2025). "Natio nostra Illyrico-Rasciana seu Serviana: The Creation of a Privileged Identity of Serbs in the Habsburg Monarchy" (PDF). Concepts of Nationalism and Patriotism in Serbian Political Discourse: Medieval, Modern, Contemporary. Belgrade: Faculty of Philosophy. pp. 83–87.
