= Serbs in Austria =

Ethnic group

Serben in Österreich Срби у Аустрији Srbi u Austriji
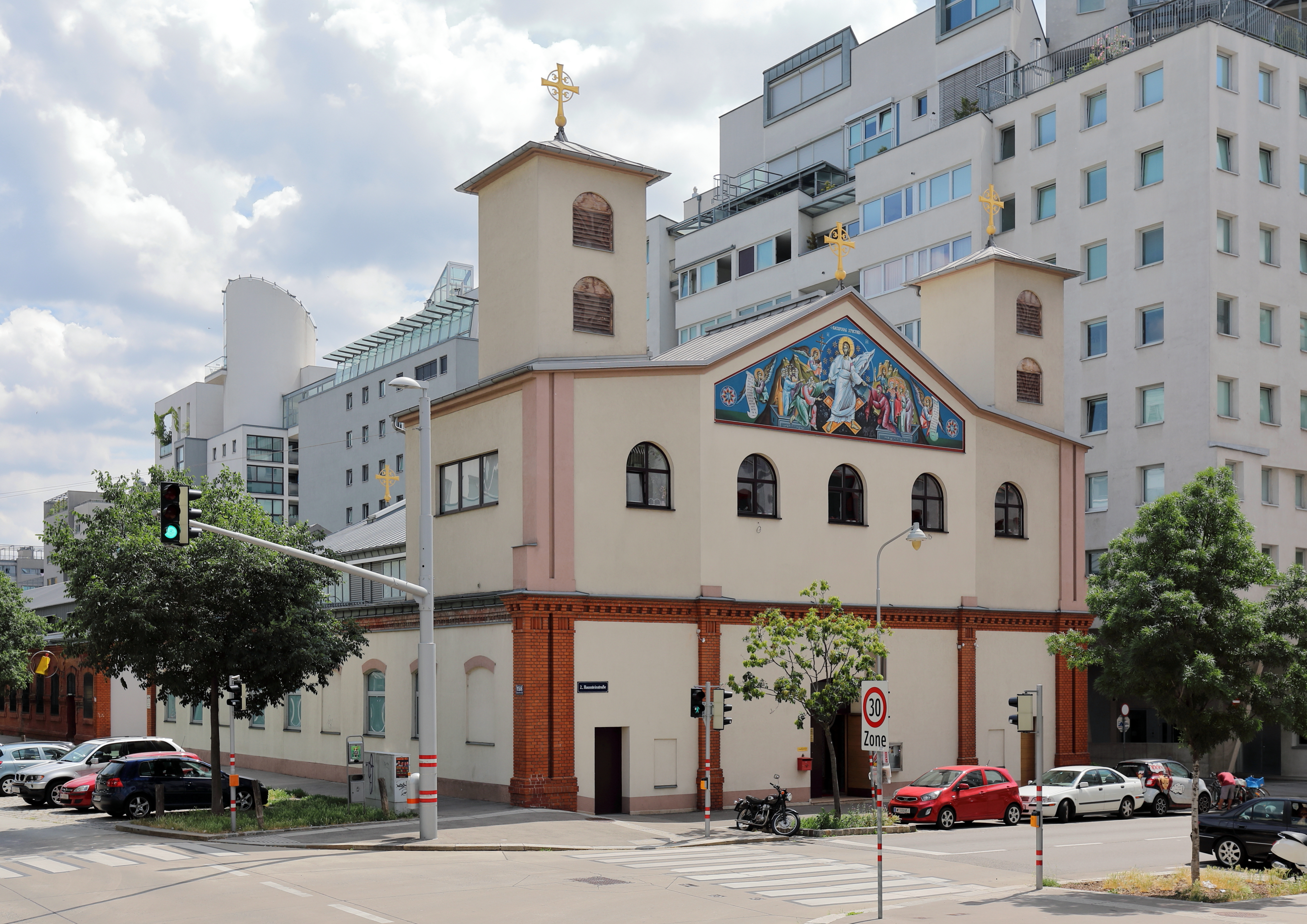
- The Resurrection of Christ Serbian Orthodox Church in Vienna

Total population
- 141,882 Serbia-born residents (2023) ~300,000 of Serb ancestry (est.)

Regions with significant populations
- Vienna, Salzburg, Upper Austria, Styria

Languages
- Austrian German and Serbian

Religion
- Eastern Orthodoxy (Serbian Orthodox Church)

Related ethnic groups
- Serbs in Germany, Serbs in Switzerland

Serbs in Austria are Austrian citizens of ethnic Serb descent and/or Serbia-born persons living in Austria. According to official data from 2023, there were 141,882 Serbia-born people living in Austria, while estimated number of people of Serb ethnic descent stands at around 300,000, representing the second largest group within the global Serb diaspora.

== History ==
Serbs have a long historical presence on the territory of modern-day Austria.

By the end of the Middle Ages, migration of ethnic Serbs towards Austrian lands was caused by expansion of the Ottoman Empire. Exiled members of Serbian noble families were welcomed by Habsburg rulers, who granted them new possessions. In 1479, emperor Friedrich III granted castle Weitensfeld in Carinthia to exiled members of Branković dynasty of Serbia.

During the period of Ottoman–Habsburg wars from 16th to 18th century, Austrian policy towards Serbs was marked by special interests, related to complex political situation in various regions of the expanding Habsburg monarchy. Emperor Leopold I issued several charters (1690, 1691, 1695) to Eastern Orthodox Serbs, who sided with Habsburgs during the Vienna War (1683-1699), granting them religious freedom in the Habsburg Empire.

Serbian Orthodox patriarch Arsenije III visited Vienna on several occasions, and died there in 1706. Serbian Orthodox metropolitan Isaija Đaković, who visited Austrian capital on several occasions since 1690, also died in Vienna, in 1708. Later Serbian Orthodox metropolitans Isaija Antonović (d. 1749) and Mojsije Putnik (d. 1790) also died i Vienna.

During the 18th and 19th century, new communities of ethnic Serbs were developing in major Austrian cities, consisting mainly of merchants, officers and students, who were under the spiritual jurisdiction of the Serbian Orthodox Metropolitanate of Karlovci. Among prominent Serbs who came to live permanently in the imperial capital were Atanasije Dimitrijević Sekereš (d. 1794 in Vienna), philologist Vuk Karadžić (since 1813, until his death in 1864) and various other officials, merchants and representatives of Serbian intelligentsia.

The largest influx by far occurred during Austria's Gastarbeiter ("guest worker") programs during the 1960s and 1970s, driven by labor shortages in Austria's booming postwar economy. Yugoslavia, under Tito's non-aligned communism, signed bilateral agreements allowing its citizens to seek temporary work abroad without defecting. Serbs formed a significant portion, often from rural areas in Serbia and Bosnia-Herzegovina. They filled low-skilled jobs in construction, manufacturing (e.g., steelworks in Linz), agriculture. In Yugoslavia, economic stagnation, housing shortages, and limited opportunities pushed migrants. Austria offered wages 5 to 10 times higher, plus family reunification prospects. With guest worker programs ended, inflows slowed to family reunification (e.g., spouses and children joining earlier migrants).This era transformed Serbs into a visible urban presence, especially in Vienna, where majority of Serbs in Austria still live.

The breakup of Yugoslavia in the early 1990s triggered a massive immigrant wave. Austria, as a neighbor, received Yugoslav asylum seekers between 1991 and 1995, including tens of thousands of Serbs. Vienna's working-class districts like Favoriten became hubs. Many were granted temporary protected status, with integration aided by existing communities.

Easier EU access for Serbian citizens (visa-free from 2010) spurred student and skilled migration. The previous waves of Serbian immigration to Austria were mostly economic (job offers, better pay), while later ones sought education and higher living standards.

In 2011, the Serbian Orthodox Eparchy of Austria and Switzerland was established.

== Demographics ==
The estimated number of people with ethnic Serb ancestry stands at around 300,000. They are heavily concentrated in Vienna, home to 98,940 people of Serb ancestry, making it the largest community in Serb diaspora. The Serbia-born population in Austria numbers 141,822 according to the 2022 census, thus Serbians form one of the largest foreign-born groups in Austria.

== Politics ==
According to post-election analysis of the 2020 Viennese state election, 46% of ethnic Serbs voted for the SPÖ, 16% for the Austrian People’s Party (ÖVP), 9% for the Freedom Party of Austria (FPÖ), and 5% for Team HC Strache – Alliance for Austria (HC).

Since 2006, the Freedom Party of Austria (FPÖ), under the leadership of Heinz-Christian Strache, has sought to gain support among ethnic Serbs in Austria.

== Notable people ==
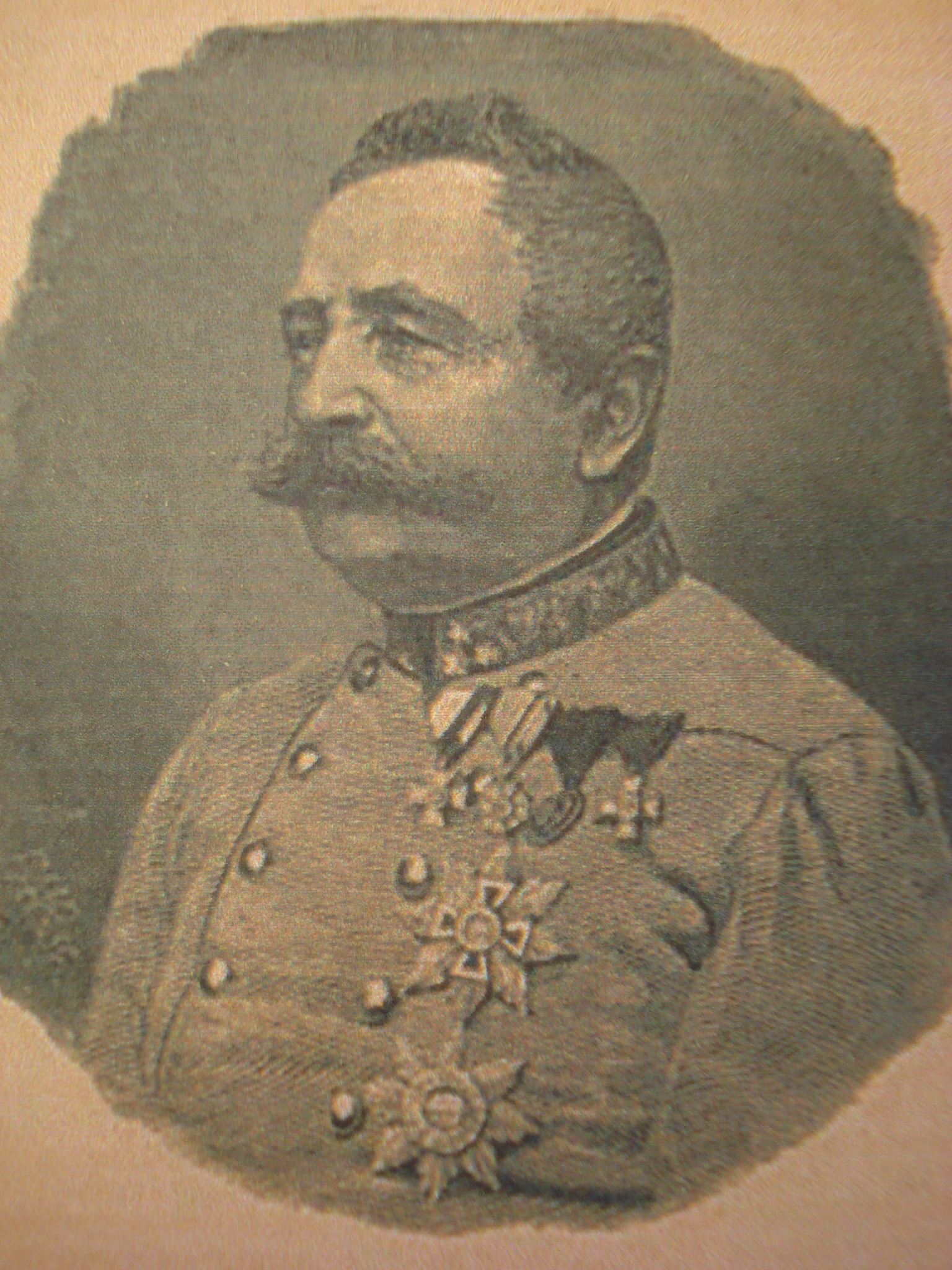
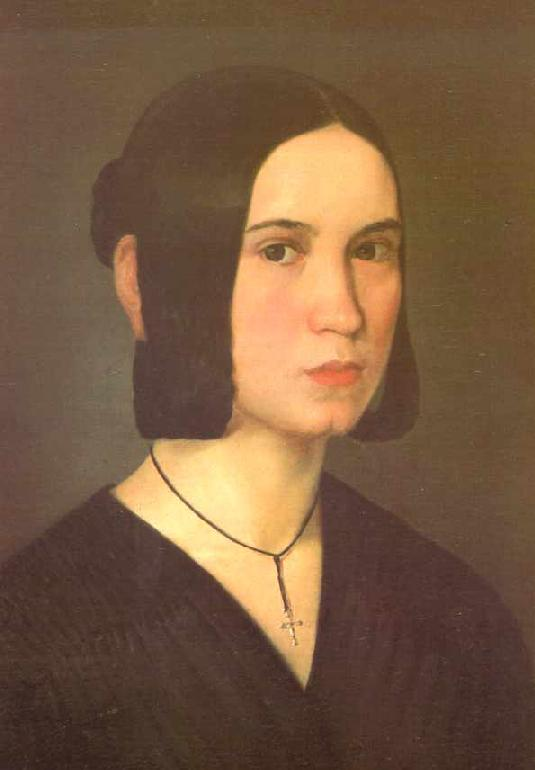
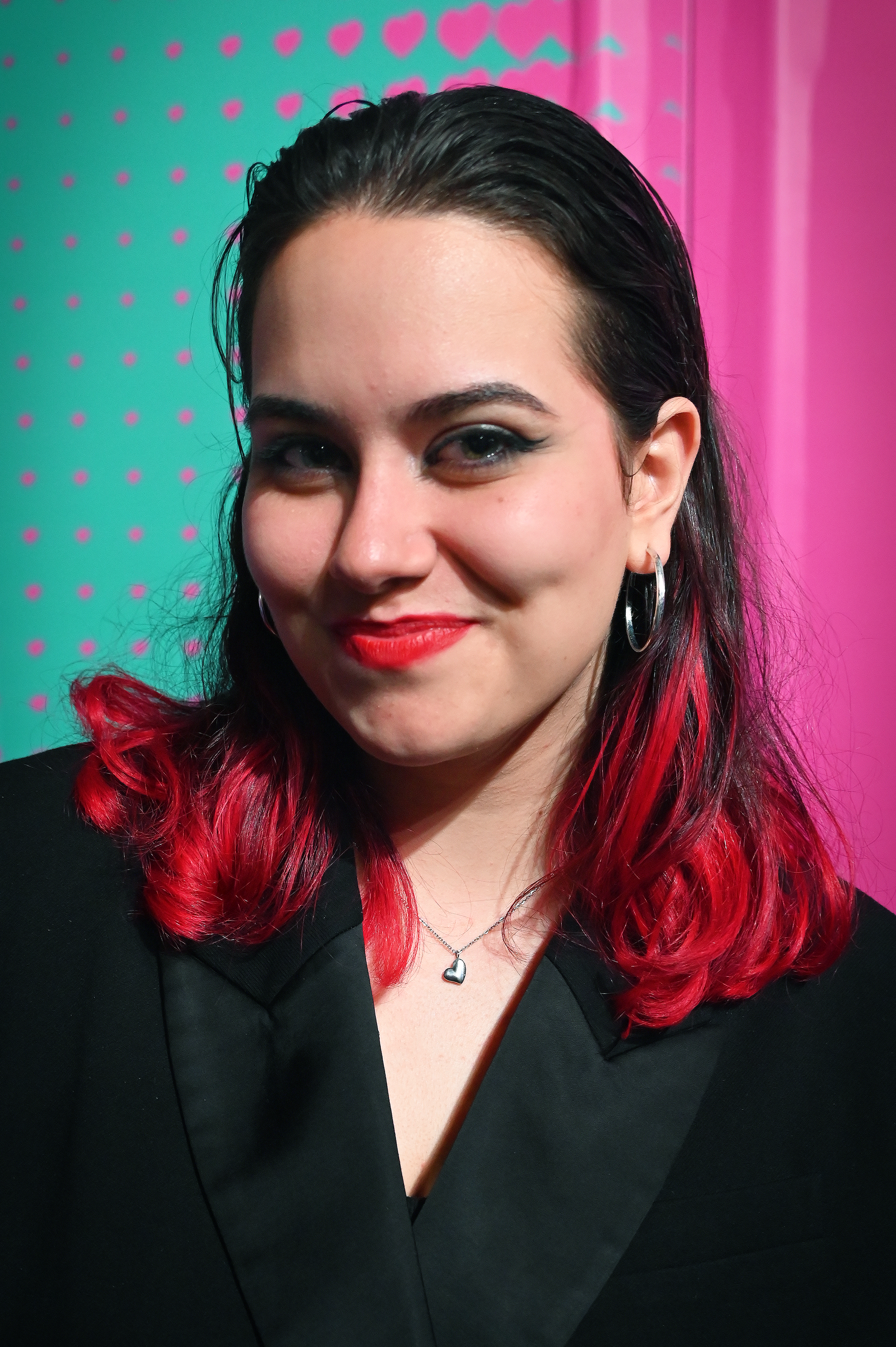
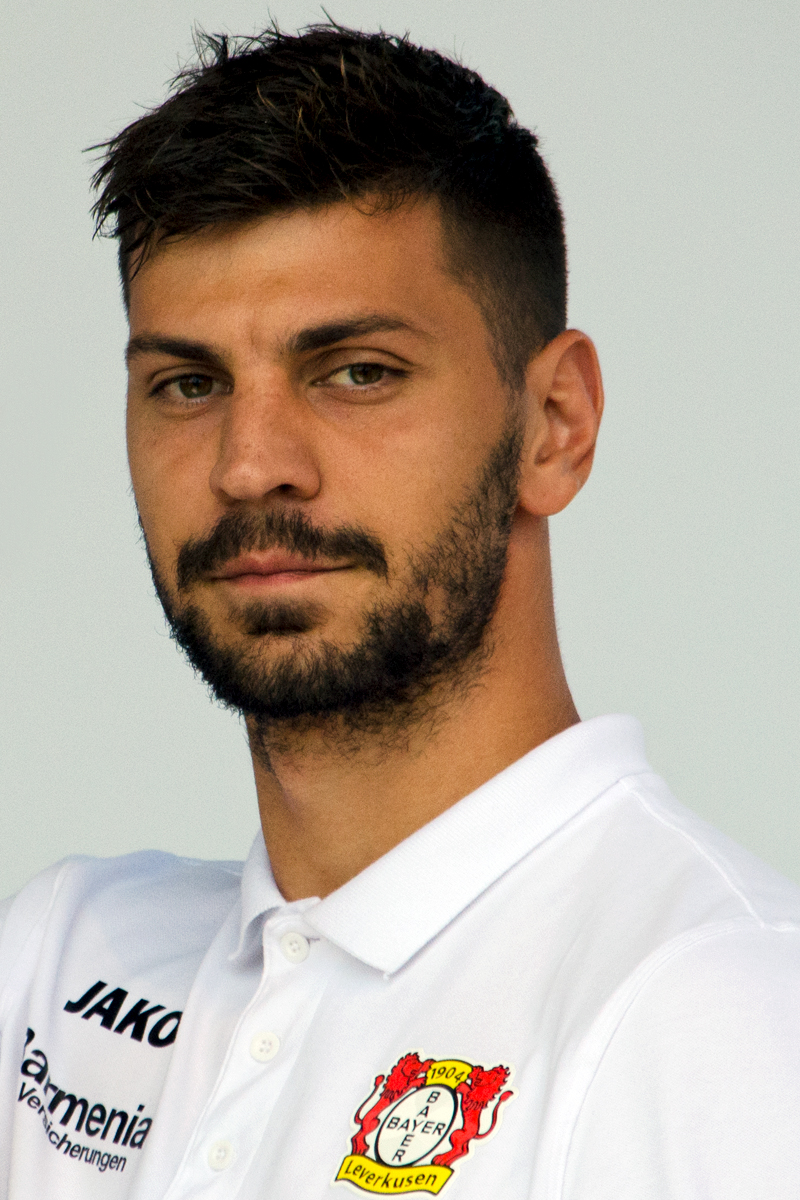
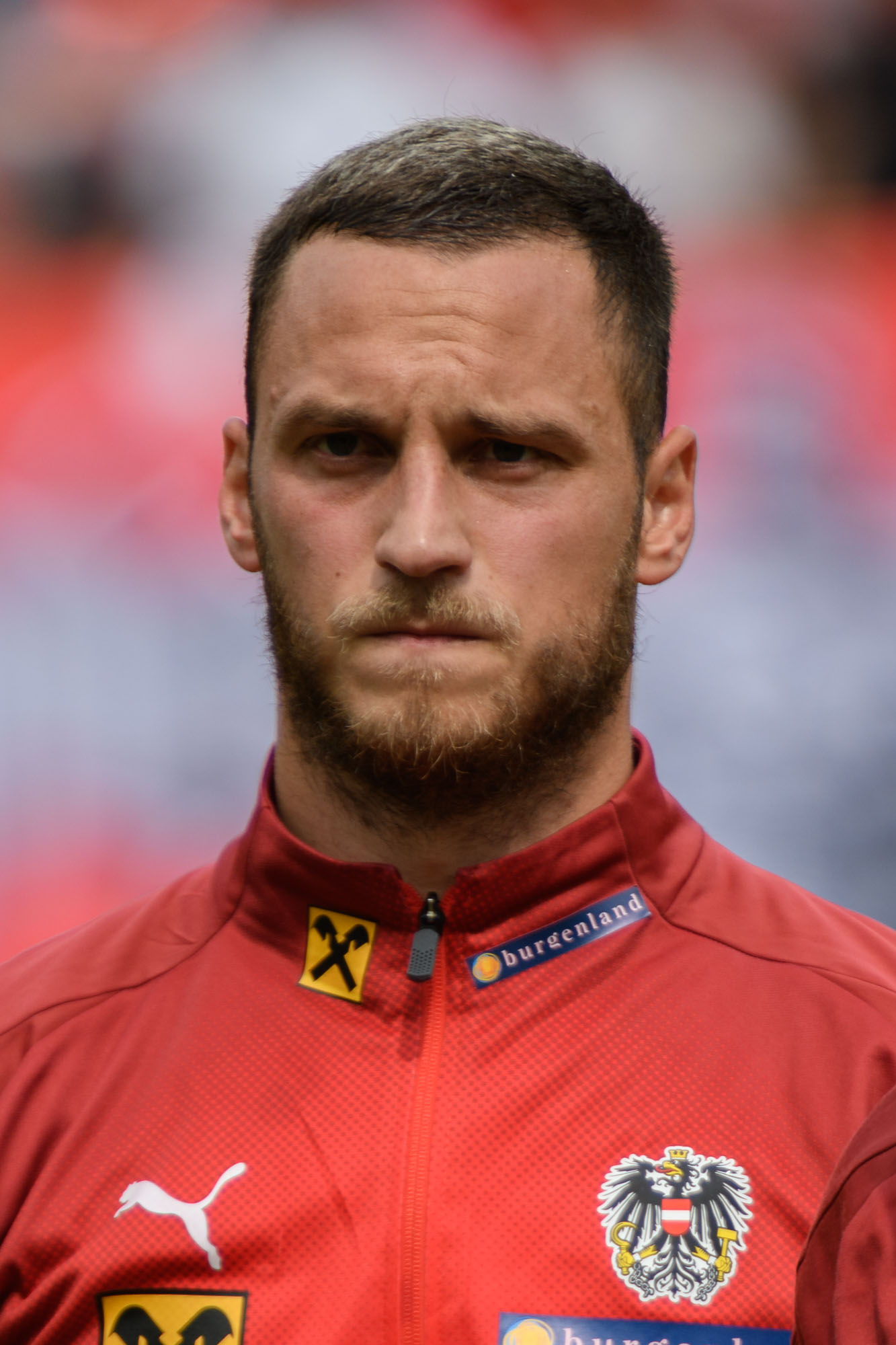
Gavrilo Rodić	Raoul Stojsavljevic	Mina Karadžić	Paja Jovanović	Teya	Madita	Aleksandar Dragović	Marko Arnautović

- Marko Arnautović – football player
- Emmerich Blagoevich – general
- Paul Davidovich – general
- Svetozar Boroević – field marshal
- Peter Tersich von Cadesich – general
- Jasminka Cive – kickboxer and mixed martial artist
- Paul Dimich – general
- Aleksandar Dragović – football player
- Paja Jovanović – painter
- Pavle Julinac – writer
- Zlatko Junuzović – football player
- Peter Duka von Kadar – general
- Andreas Karaczay – general
- Mina Karadžić – painter and writer
- Christian Kovacevic – politician
- Jeronim Ljubibratić – general
- Madita – singer
- Lazar Mamula – general
- Josif Milovuk – writer
- Paul von Radivojevich – general
- Demeter Radossevich von Rados – general
- Gabriel von Rodich – general
- Mileva Roller – painter
- Arsenije Sečujac – general
- Raoul Stojsavljevic – flying ace pilot
- Teya – singer
- Zera – singer

== See also ==
- Immigration to Austria
- Serb diaspora
- Austria–Serbia relations
- Serbian Orthodox Eparchy of Austria

== Sources ==
- Ćirković, Sima (2004). The Serbs. Malden: Blackwell Publishing. ISBN 9781405142915.
- Jireček, Constantin (1918). Geschichte der Serben. Vol. 2. Gotha: Perthes.
- Stiegnitz, Peter; Kosinski, Danuta (1990). Religions in Austria. Vienna: Federal Press Service.
- Točanac-Radović, Isidora (2022). "The Great Migration of Serbs and the Question of the Serbian Ethnic and Religious Community in the Habsburg Monarchy". Migrations in the Slavic Cultural Space: From the Middle Ages to the Present Day. Łódź: Łódź University Press. pp. 15–27.
- Točanac-Radović, Isidora (2025). "Natio nostra Illyrico-Rasciana seu Serviana: The Creation of a Privileged Identity of Serbs in the Habsburg Monarchy" (PDF). Concepts of Nationalism and Patriotism in Serbian Political Discourse: Medieval, Modern, Contemporary. Belgrade: Faculty of Philosophy. pp. 83–87.
