= Mihailo Vitković =

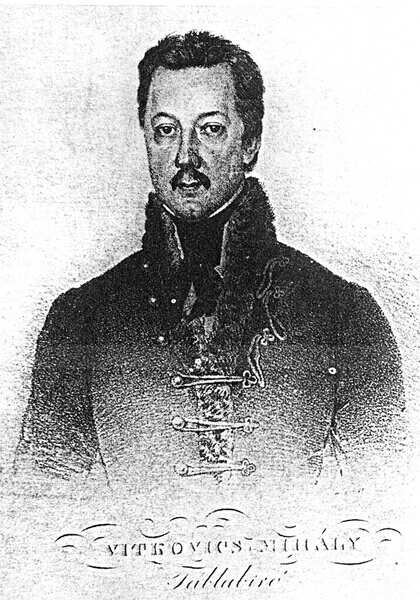
Mihailo Vitković

Mihailo Vitković (Eger, 25 August 1778-Pest, 9 September 1829) was a Serbian and Hungarian poet, translator and lawyer. The well-to-do Serbian lawyer was an active participant in the organization and efflorescence of Hungarian and Serbian cultural and literary development. He was a contemporary of György Bessenyei, Ferenc Kazinczy, József Kármán, Ferenc Toldy, Károly Kisfaludy, Mihály Csokonai Vitéz, József Bajza and Serbs Jovan Pačić, Jovan Muškatirović and Lukijan Mušicki. Vitković carried an extensive correspondence with his prominent Hungarian contemporaries as well as his Serb writers and intellectuals.

Two literatures—one Hungarian (Mihály Vitkovics) -- and the other Serbian (Mihailo Vitković) -- claim him, and with equal right. He cultivated some of the genres (the epigramma, for example) with equal success in both Hungarian and Serbian.

Mihailo Vitković started his career as a writer on the staff of a conservative Hungarian paper adopting a militant attitude with respect to the radical Hungarian reform programme. There can be no doubt as to his having been a bilingual poet and author: he wrote with equal ease in Hungarian and in Serbian, he was equally interested in Serbian and Hungarian literary events, and took an active part in the literary life of both.

As for Mihailo Vitković, his background already was multilingual and multicultural. The Serbs sent their children to the Szeged Piarist School and then to one of the Protestant secondary schools in Debrecen and Sopron, or to other schools in the north of Hungary where they had more opportunities for better education. Vitković 's schooling was no different. In 1804 he graduated from the University of Pest with a law degree, passed his bar exam, and started his practice in the same city. Later, he became a member of the Diet of Hungary (Sabor).

== Translations of novels ==
Serbian work that comes closest to Vitković trend is Dositej Obradović's autobiography Bildungsroman. Mihailo Vitković, however, had another type of novel in mind. He was greatly attracted by the example of Ferenc Kazinczy, the most prominent figure of contemporary Hungarian literary life and language reform and by the possibility of combining the sentimental novel (adapted to his mother tongue) with a good strong plot. Therefore, he made a Serbian "orchestration" of József Kármán's novel, Fanni hagyományai (Fanny's Testament).

== Translations of poetry ==
Vitković's translations of Serbian poetry – A szerbusi, vagyis rác nyelvről (1819) – introduce Hungarian writers to a heroic style that initiates a new wave of Hungarian poetry in the szerbus manir.

== Works in Serbian ==
- Milica (a translation of Marmontel's work)
- Lukijanu Mušickom kad je na stepen arhimandristva stupio (1812)
- Grobnij nadpis Vase Čarapića serbskog junaka (epigram)
- Ljubovi (1817, sentimental city poems)
- Pesmi o berbi (sentimental poems)
