= Muškatirović =

Muškatirović is a Serbian surname, derived from the word musketeer. It may refer to:

- Jovan Muškatirović (1743-1809), Habsburg Serbian writer
- Milan Muškatirović (1934-1993), Yugoslav water polo goalkeeper
- Srđan Muškatirović (b. 1972), Serbian former tennis player
