= Peter Tersich von Cadesich =

- Born: 1739; Kovilj, Habsburg Monarchy
- Died: 22 December 1806 (aged 66–67); Pančevo, Habsburg Monarchy
- Military career
- Allegiance: Habsburg Monarchy; Austrian Empire
- Branch: Army
- Service years: 1751–1806
- Rank: Generalmajor

General Petar Terzić (Peter Tersich von Cadesich (Serbian Cyrillic: Генерал Петар Терзић) was born in Kovilj, Slavonia, Habsburg monarchy, 1739 and died in Pančevo, Banat, Habsburg Monarchy, 22 December 1806. He was an Austrian nobleman and Major General who fought in the Ottoman and Napoleonic wars. By 1802, Tersich von Cadesich was the director of the Ingenieur Akademie in Vienna.

== Career ==
In 1751 he became a cadet; in 1752, an ensign; and in 1753, lieutenant. As a graduate cadet of the Imperial-Royal Army in the Habsburg Monarchy, he rose through the military ranks, in 1765, he was promoted to captain; and by 1790, reached the rank of colonel. In 1794, Tersich von Cadesich was promoted to Generalmajor.

In the Serbian Banat occasionally officers and frontier guardsmen were stripped of their rank. Terzić always supported the Serbian claim in military lawsuits when General Peter Duka came to adjudicate, even though Duka sought to blunt the accusations.

In 1804 when the First Serbian Uprising broke out, Terzić openly supported Karađorđe's Serbia at a time when Austria stood neutral. Terzić again found himself in trouble with his superiors for supporting Serb rebels and, if not for General Duka's intervention, Terzić would have faced a court-martial. Terzić even recorded the exact date of the start of the Serbian Revolution, "7 March 1804".

He was promoted to brigadier general in 1794 and on 21 August 1796 he received the rank of General Major.

== See also ==
- Peter Duka von Kadar
- Martin von Dedovich
- Joseph von Dedovich
- Paul Dimich
- Ignaz Stojanich
- Andreas von Stoichevich
