= Kulpin, Serbia =

Kulpin Кулпин (Serbian) Kulpín (Slovak)
- Village (Selo)
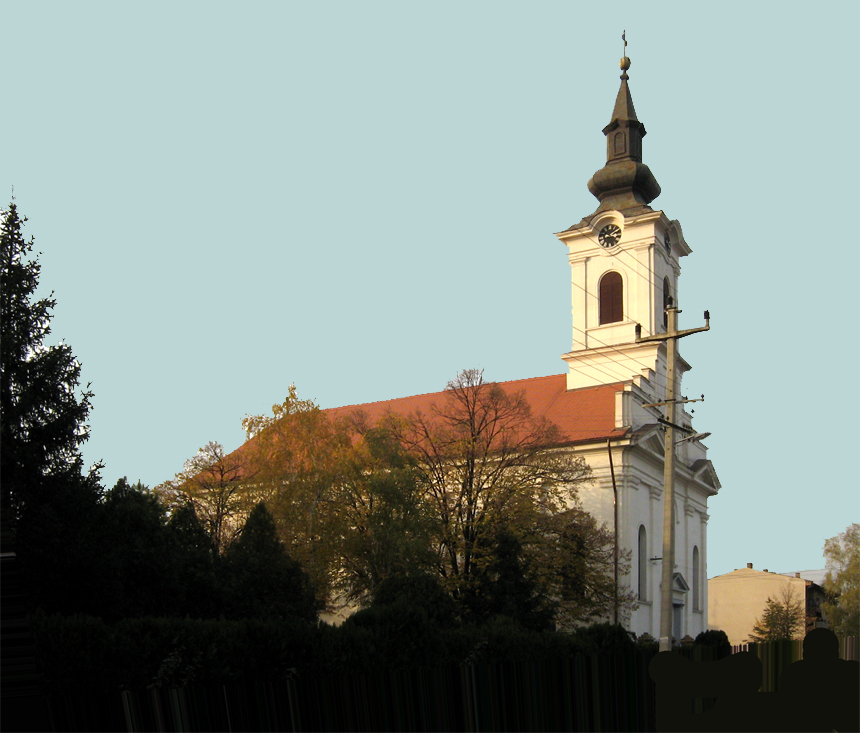
- The Evangelical (Slovak) Church

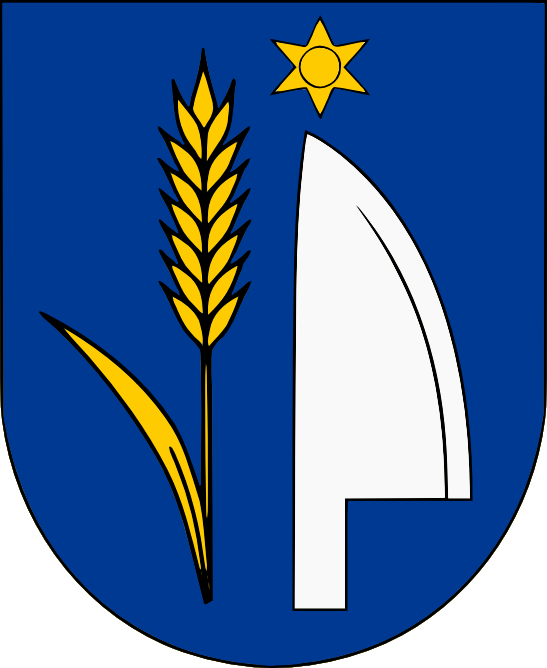
- Seal

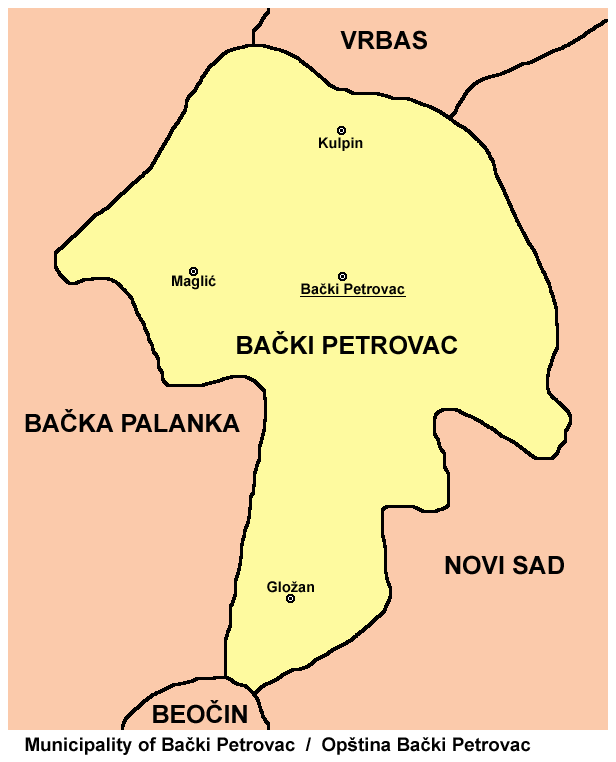
- Map of the Bački Petrovac municipality, showing the location of Kulpin

- Location within Vojvodina Location within Serbia Location within Europe
- Coordinates: 45°24′03″N 19°35′13″E
- Country: Serbia
- Province: Vojvodina
- Region: Bačka (Podunavlje)
- District: South Bačka
- Municipality: Bački Petrovac

Area
  - Land: 14.1 sq mi (36.4 km^{2})
- Elevation: 272 ft (83 m)

Population (2022)
  - Total: 2,431
  - Density: 173/sq mi (66.8/km^{2})
- Time zone: UTC+1 (CET)
  - Summer (DST): UTC+2 (CEST)

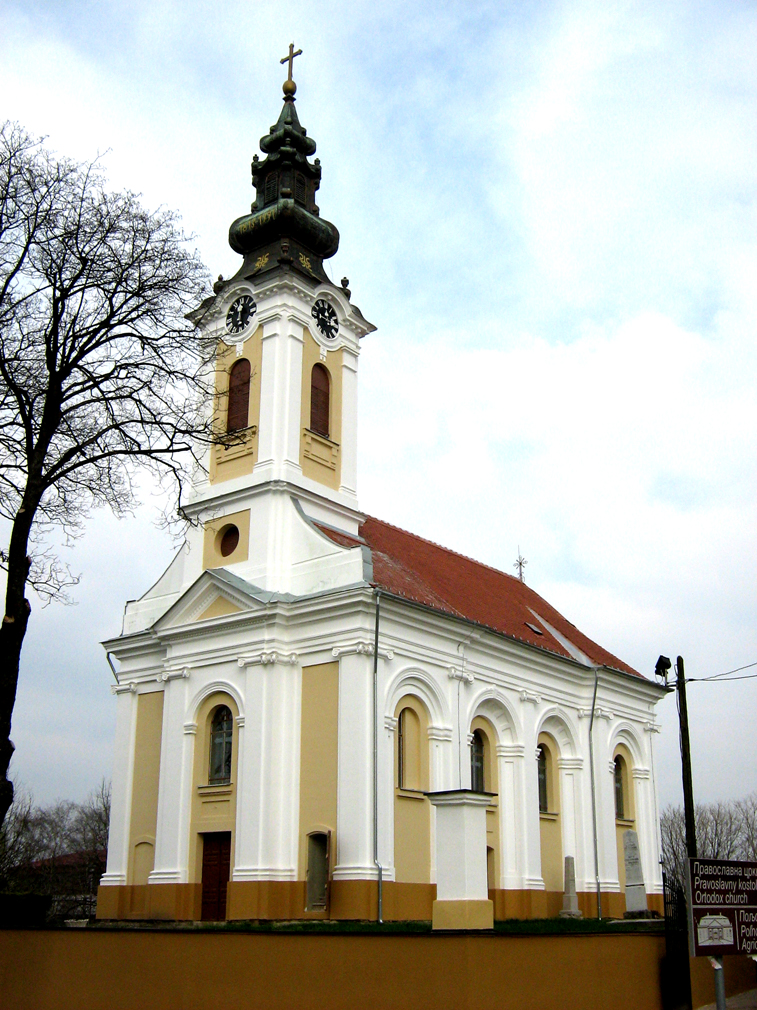
The Orthodox Church

Kulpin (Serbian Cyrillic: Кулпин; Slovak: Kulpín; Hungarian: Kölpény) is a village located in the Bački Petrovac municipality, South Bačka District, Vojvodina, Serbia. The village has a population of 2,431 inhabitants (2022 census).

== Demographics ==
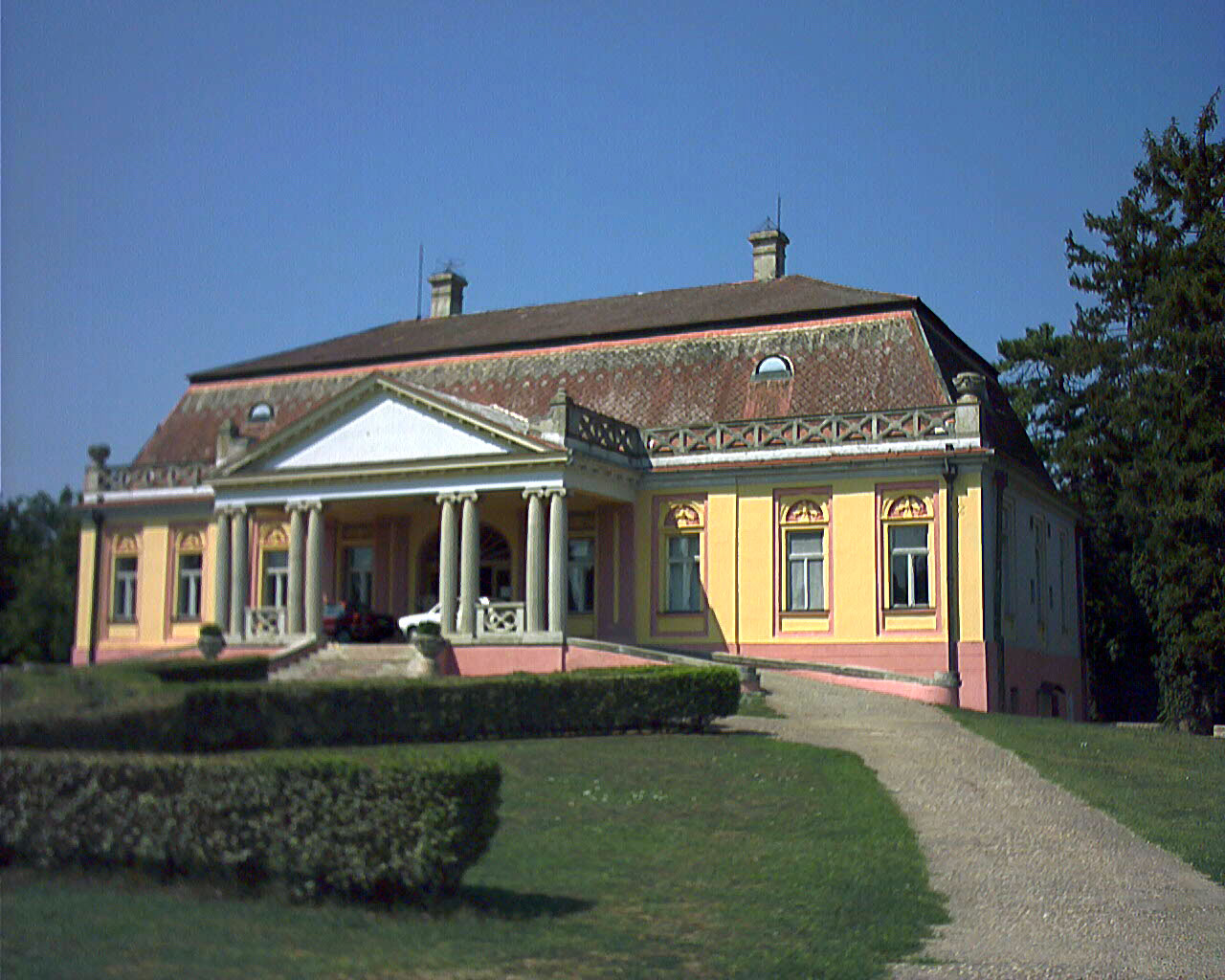
The 'Dunđerski Castle' in Kulpin

=== Historical population ===
- 1961: 3,742
- 1971: 3,312
- 1981: 3,226
- 1991: 3,203
- 2002: 2,976
- 2022: 2,431

=== Ethnic groups ===
According to data from the 2022 census, ethnic groups in the village include:

- 1,588 (65.3%) Slovaks
- 609 (25%) Serbs
- Others/Undeclared/Unknown

== Notable people ==
- Bogić Vučković
- Georgije Branković
- Stefan Stratimirović

== See also ==
- List of places in Serbia
- List of cities, towns and villages in Vojvodina
