= Joakim Marković =

Serbian painter (c.1685–1757)

Joakim Marković (c. 1685–1757) was a Serb painter from Slavonia from the time of the Habsburg monarchy.

== Biography ==
He painted icons for the iconostasis of two bishopric churches in Pakrac and Severin County, and in St. Thomas Church in Dišnik (now Garešnica). Artistically and historically Marković's most interesting iconostasis is the memorial church built by a Serbian military border officer, Baron Mihajlo Mikašinović in Plavšinac.

In Plavšinac, Joakim Marković painted two historical compositions in 1750, one showing the privileges bestowed by Byzantine emperor Basil II on the Serbs and Croats - the privilege of establishing themselves in his dominion. That painting is now in Zagreb. The second Marković's painting shows the Austrian monarch Rudolf II with Serbs.

Marković painted primarily religious-themed icons and frescoes. He did frescoes for the Metropolitanate of Karlovci in the church monasteries throughout Fruška Gora. He later returned to Buda where he continued to work until he died in 1757.

== Selected works ==
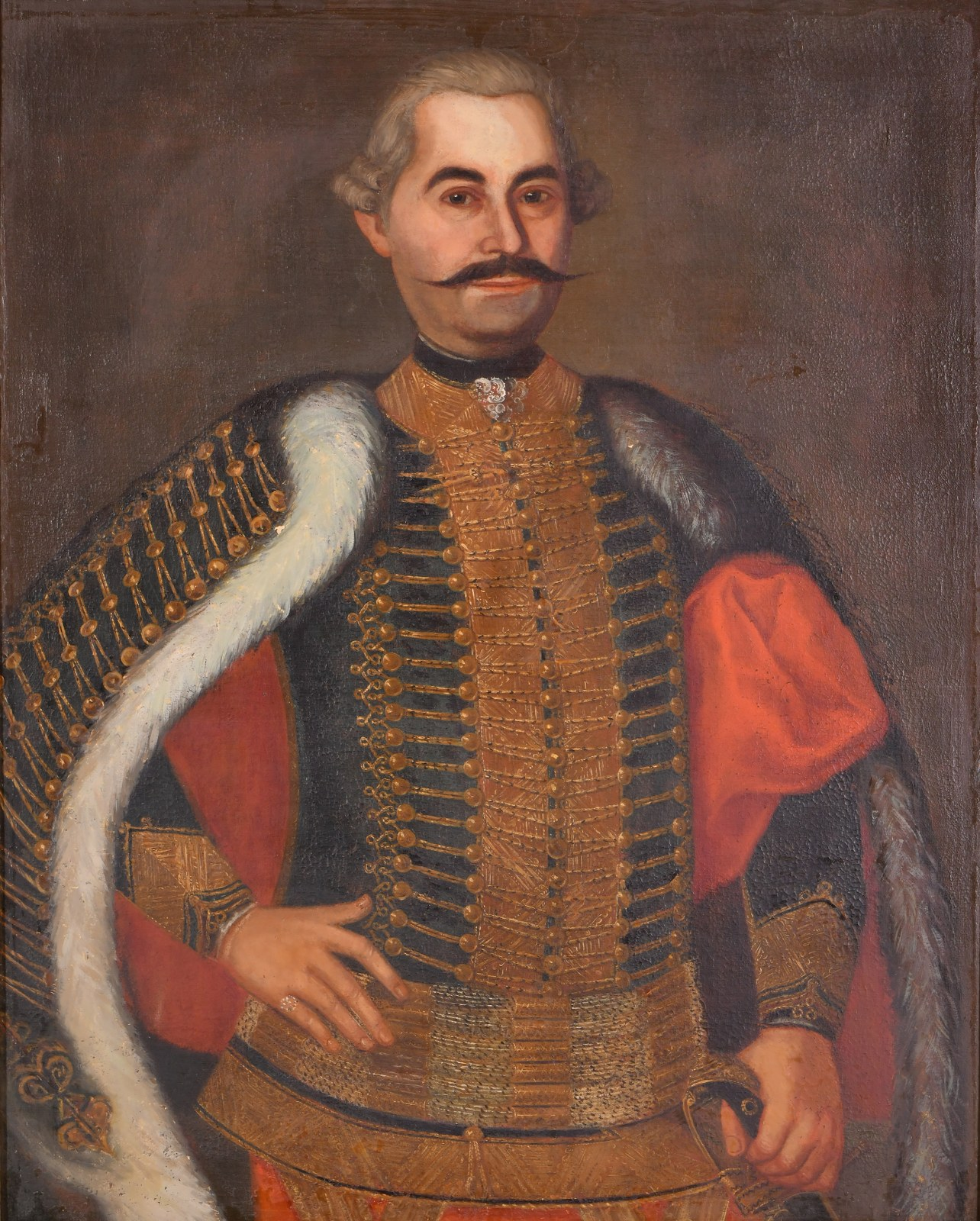
Portrait of Sekula Vitković, Oberkapetan of Petrovaradin (1734), Gallery of Matica Srpska

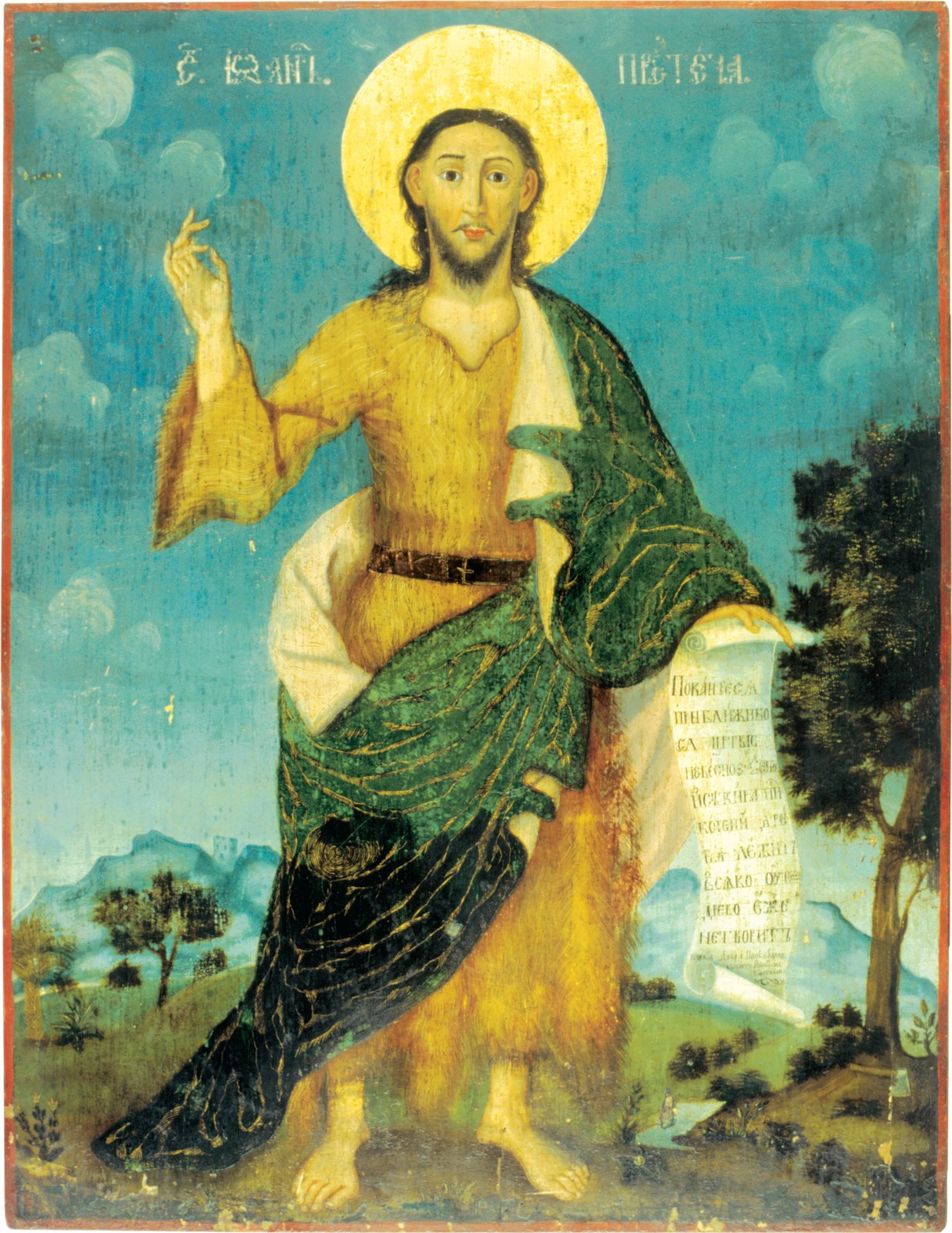
St. John the Forerunner (1749), Gallery of Matica Srpska

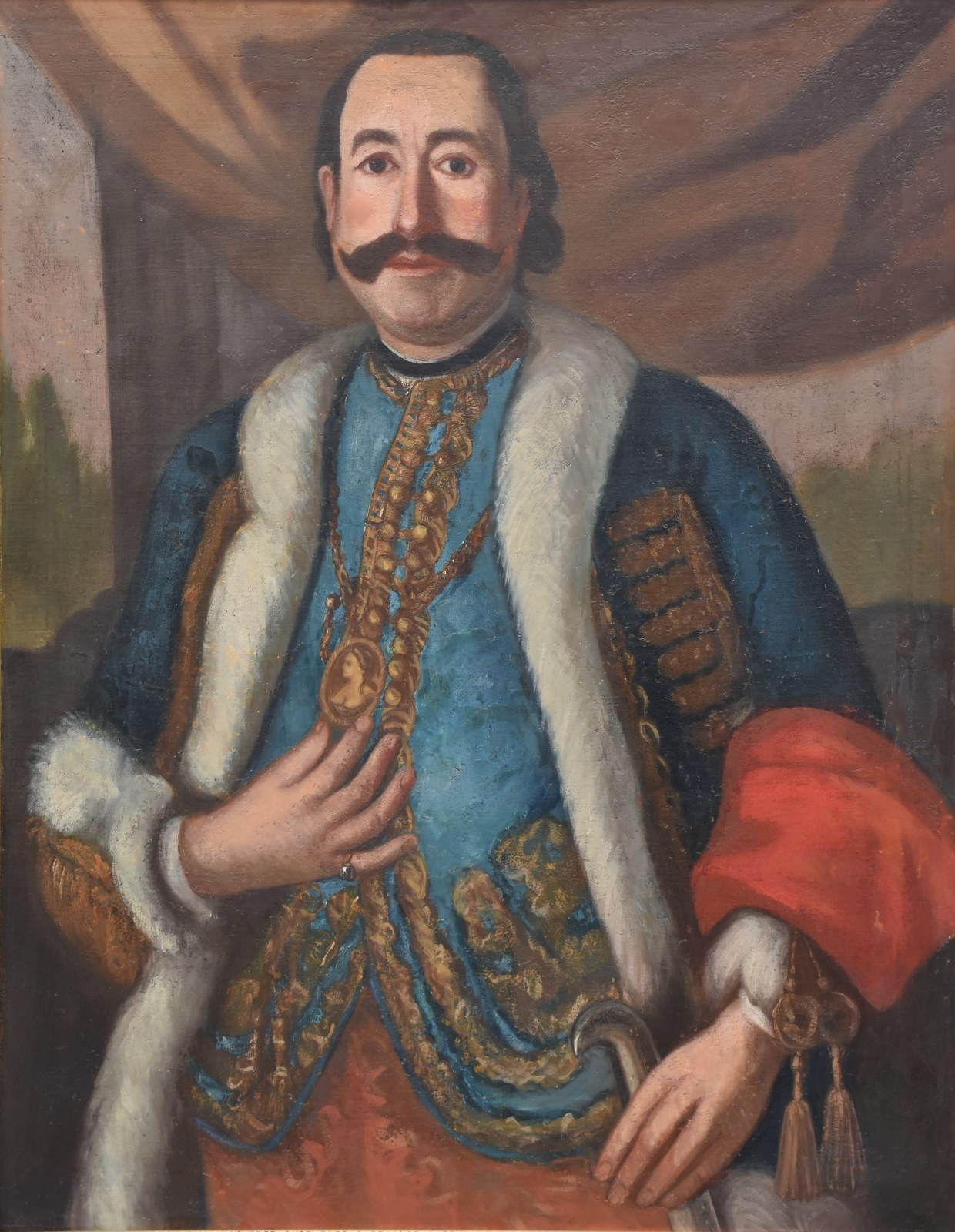
Portrait of Jovan Belgradi (c.1750), Gallery of Matica Srpska

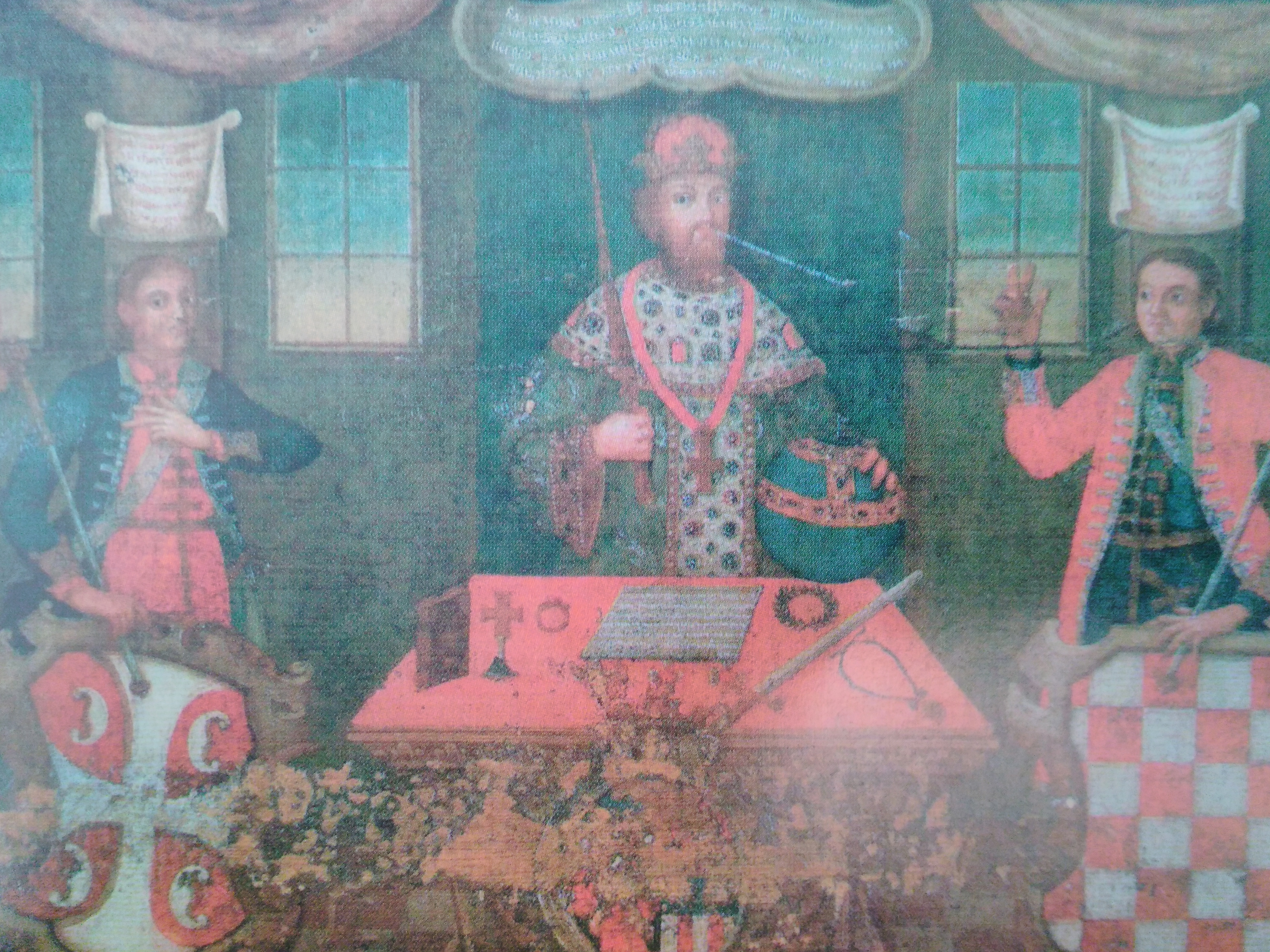
Serbs and Croats in front of Basil II, Holy Roman Emperor, Museum of the Serbian Orthodox Church in Zagreb
