= Battle of Orșova (1788) =

- Part of Austro-Turkish War (1788–1791)
Date	7 August 1788
Location	Orșova
Result	Ottoman victory

Belligerents
Habsburg monarchy	Ottoman Empire

Commanders and leaders
(Habsburg monarchy) Paul Dimich von Papilla (Habsburg monarchy) Lieutenant-Colonel Pál Szentiványi †	Koca Yusuf Pasha

Strength
Wallachian cavalry regiment and the De Vins Hungarian infantry battalion	Unknown

Casualties and losses
Entirety of De Vins battalion except 70 were killed. 11 cannons captured	Unknown

The Battle of Orsova was a military engagement between the Habsbug and the Ottoman armies during the Austro-Turkish War of 1788–1791. The Ottomans were victorious and routed the Austrians.

== Background ==
The Ottomans were determined to pursue their goals. Their first plan was to recapture the Crimean peninsula from the Russian empire which was lost in 1774. Since the Austrians also threatened them from the west, the Ottomans sent a greater part of their forces against them under the leadership of the Grand Vizier, Koca Yusuf Pasha. The Ottoman plan was to break into Banat and defeat the Austrian army at Mehadia.

== Battle ==
The Ottoman vanguard appeared on the right bank of the Danube River opposite old Orsova on the morning of August 7. The Austrians held a position at Szupany, 2,5 kilometers north of the Danube at Orsova. Commanded by Paul Dimich von Papilla, the Austrian force consisted of the Wallachian cavalry regiment and the De Vins Hungarian infantry battalion led by Lieutenant-Colonel Pál Szentiványi. The Ottoman began bombarding De Vin's position which lasted 8 hours. The Ottomans began crossing the Danube using 13 ships and Szentiványi directed his guns against them but failed to prevent them. Seeing the dangerous situation, Papilla dispatched Romanian squadrons to help De Vin's battalion. Szentiványi sent a part of his force to prevent their crossing but failed.

Failed to prevent the Ottoman crossing, De Vin's battalion retreated. The Ottoman captured Austrian boats and facilitated the crossing faster. The Ottomans then chased the retreating battalion and attacked them at the village of Szupany. Szentiványi turned to face them. When he noticed they were about to attack from one of the hillsides, he sent part of his troops against them and defended with the rest in a square formation. But the Ottoman's superior strength made it impossible for him to hold his ground for any time. so he moved slowly backward to the village of Koramnik, north of Szupany.

The village of Koramnik was suddenly swarming with Turks. Attacking them would have meant the destruction of the battalion. The Austrians divided troops into smaller groups and tried to escape from the Ottomans by crossing the mountain range to the west. Even so, the retreat still claimed heavy losses. Only 70 of the battalion escaped on the roads through the rocky crevasses of the mountains. The rest lost their lives on the dangerous steep slopes. Szentivánvi himself, on his horse, fell into a deep ravine and was crushed to death. The Austrians lost 11 cannons alongside ammunition to the Ottomans.

== Aftermath ==
Papilla managed to escape with some of his troops. The troops at Szupany were originally dispatched to guard any possible Ottoman sorites from the city of Orsova. Joseph complained regarding the defeat and claimed it should never happened. Papilla's forces should've taken a position in the mountains But Papilla had either disregarded these instructions or they could not be fulfilled.

== Sources ==
- Matthew Z Mayer (1997), Joseph II, and the campaign of 1788 against the Ottoman Turks.
- István Redvay (1942), Hadtörténelmi közlemények, II. József török háborúja (1788–1790), Vol 43.
