= Mihailo Maksimović =

Mihailo Maksimović also Mihajlo Maksimović (Serbian: Михаило Максимовић; c. 1745 - after 1792) was a Serbian satirist, professor, translator, and writer. He was very familiar with the life and work of Dositej Obradović.

== Biography ==
He is one of the least known literary figures in Serbia whose biography is incomplete. There is no sure date of his birth or death and the chronological happenings that occurred in his lifetime have yet to be put in sequence. His contemporaries were Dositej Obradović, Jovan Rajić, Pavle Solarić, Stefan von Novaković, Arsenije Sečujac and others. As a teacher, he lived and worked in Vienna for a time and was also employed in the Illyrian Court Chancellery (dvorske ilirske kancelarije) as its secretary.

Maksimović wrote his satires in a series of articles under the title Mali bukvar za veliku decu ("Little premier for grown-up children") in the language of the common people instead of the antiquated Slavonic-Serbian. His articles, printed in Serbian newspapers, were later compiled and published as a book in Vienna in 1792 under the same title. We know he was a professor because he was moved so many times to new posts. That happened because he was opposed to the Roman Catholic Church's dominance of secular concerns, especially education. He was forced to spend the rest of his life in minor posts distant from Vienna (such as Petrovaradin and other such places that were considered remote in the Habsburg Empire), like many others in the decade following the French Revolution he became quite reactionary in line with the shifts that saw most of the Austrian Emperor Joseph's reforms of the 1780s retracted before he died.

== Literary work ==
Not surprisingly, the great age of satire in Serbian literature dates from the eighteenth century and comes from the pen of Mihailo Maksimović who put into common Serbian Čto je papa? (Was ist der Papst? or "Who is the Pope?") in 1784 that gleans the works of François-Antoine Devaux's (1712–1796) on reclaiming of lands and the Austrian Febronianist pamphleteer Joseph Valentin Eybel's relentless and scurrilous attacks on the Roman Curia, namely the Pope.

In 1792, Mihailo Maksimović's Mali bukvar za veliku decu (Small Primer for Grown-up Children) was published as the first satirical book of modern Serbian literature.
