= Sečujac =

Sečujac (Serbian Cyrillic: Сечујац, German: Seczujacz) is a Serbian surname meaning "someone from Sečuj. It may refer to:

- Arsenije Sečujac (1720–1814), Habsburg Monarchy general
- Đorđe Sečujac (fl. 1751), Habsburg Monarchy captain
