= Christian Kovacevic =

Austrian politician (born 1968)

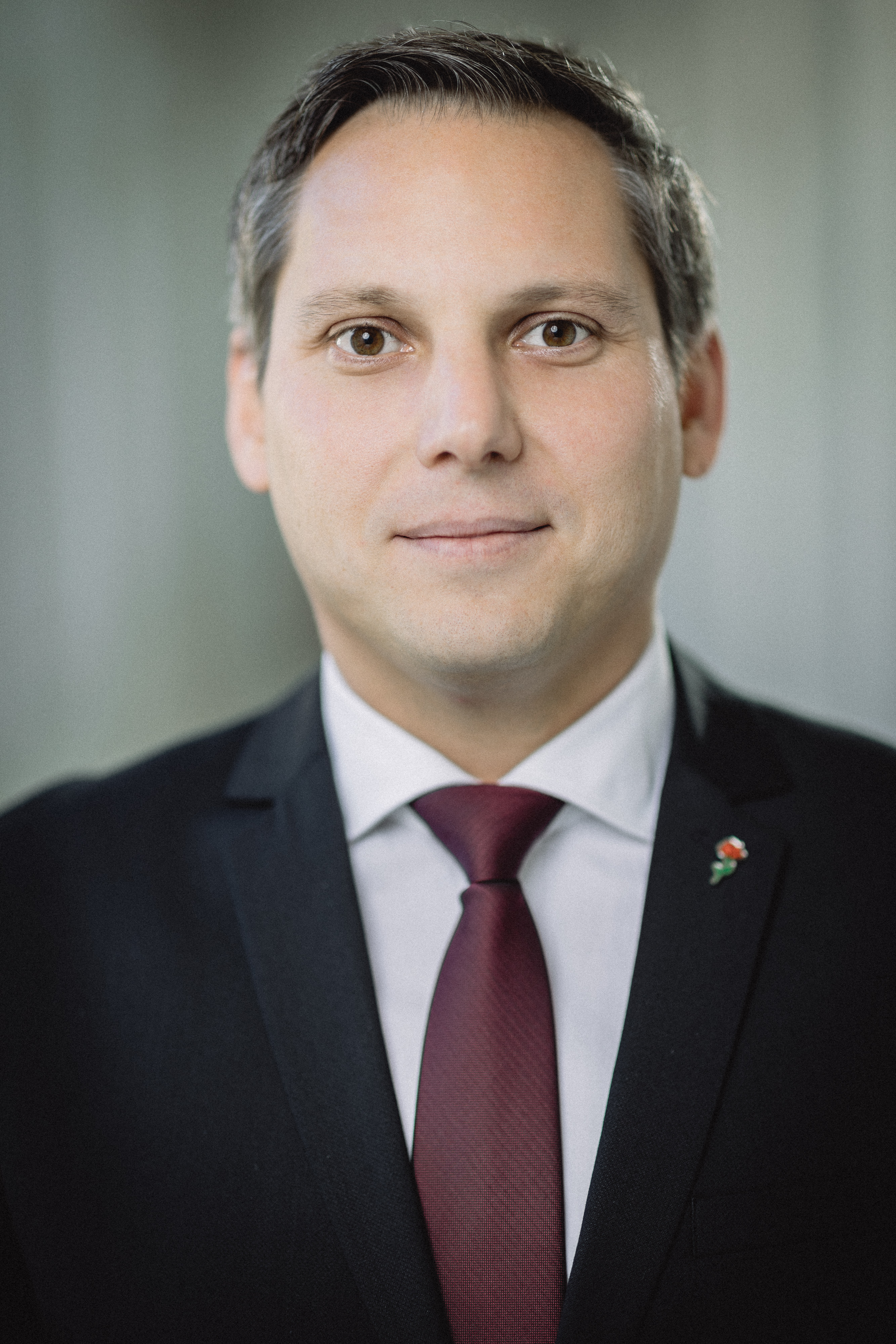

Member of the Landtag of Tyrol
- Incumbent
- Assumed office October 2022

Member of the National Council
- In office 9 November 2017 – 22 October 2019

Personal details
- Born: August 1983 (age 43) Wörgl, Austria
- Party: Social Democratic Party

Christian Kovacevic (born August 1983) is an Austrian politician of the Social Democratic Party. He was elected to the National Council in 2017 and is currently a member of the Landtag of Tyrol. Kovacevic is ethnically Serbian and chaired the Austrian National Council's Friendship Group with Serbia. In 2025, Kovacevic was elected deputy chairman of the Tyrolean SPÖ.
