= Đorđe Sečujac =

Đorđe Sečujac von Heldenfeld
- Born: ca. 1700
- Died: after 1759
- Allegiance: Habsburg Monarchy
- Branch: Army
- Service years: 1715–59
- Rank: captain (1751)
- Commands: Varadin

Đorđe Sečujac or Georgije (fl. 1715–59) was a Habsburg military commander. He was the father of Arsenije Sečujac, a Habsburg major general and baron.

== Life ==
Sečujac was an ethnic Serb. He married Ana Stanisavljević, with whom he had several children, including Arsenije Sečujac, who became a Habsburg major general and baron. His other two sons were also Habsburg military personnel.

Sečujac was the captain of the Varadin captaincy, established in 1750, and he received noble status with the predicate von Heldenfeld in 1759, an award for his 44 years of military service.

== See also ==
- Sečujac, surname
