= József Kármán =

József Kármán

József Kármán (14 March 1769 in Losonc – 3 June 1795 in Losonc), sentimentalist Hungarian author, was born at Losonc (today Lučenec in Slovakia) in 1769, the son of a Calvinist pastor. He was educated at Losonc and Pest, whence he migrated to Vienna. There he made the acquaintance of the beautiful and eccentric Countess Markovics, who was for a time his mistress, but she was not, as has often been supposed, the heroine of his famous novel Fanni hagyományai ("Fanny's testament"). Subsequently, he settled in Pest as a lawyer.

His sensibility, social charm, liberal ideas (he was one of the earliest of the Magyar freemasons) and personal beauty opened the doors of the best houses to him. He was generally known as the Pest Alcibiades, and was especially at home in the salons of the Protestant magnates. In 1792, together with Count Ráday, he founded the first theatrical society at Buda. He maintained that Pest, not Pozsony should be the literary center of Hungary, and in 1794 founded the first Hungarian quarterly, Urania, but it met with little support and ceased to exist in 1795, after three volumes had appeared. Kármán, who had long been suffering from an incurable disease, died in the same year.

The most important contribution to Urania was his sentimental novel, Fanni hagyományai, much in the style of La nouvelle Héloise and Sorrows of Young Werther, the most exquisite product of Hungarian prose in the 18th century and one of the finest psychological romances in the literature. Kármán also wrote two satires and fragments of an historical novel, while his literary program is set forth in his dissertation A nemzet csinosodása ("Beautification of the Nation").
