= Mihajlo Mikašinović =

Serbian general and baron (1715–1774)

- Born: 1715; Plavšinac, Slavonian Military Frontier
- Died: 1774 (aged 58–59); Koprivnica, Military Frontier
- Military career
- Allegiance: Habsburg Monarchy
- Branch: Army
- Rank: Feldmarschalleutnant

Mihajlo Mikašinović (Serbian Cyrillic: Михајло Микашиновић; 1715–1774) was the first Serbian general with the high rank of Lieutenant Field Marshal in the Habsburg Empire.

== Biography ==
Mihajlo Mikašinović was born in the village of Plavšinac (near Novigrad Podravski), to a distinguished Serbian military family from the Slavonian Military Frontier of the Austro-Hungarian Empire.

Around 1750, Mikašinović commissioned Joakim Marković to paint two historical paintings for the iconostas of the church in his village. One depicted the meeting of Serbs and Croats with the Byzantine emperor Basil the Macedonian, and another depicted the 1612 bestowment of Frontier privileges by the Habsburg Emperor Rudolf II. The paintings were located in the old wooden church, and are preserved in the Croatian History Museum in Zagreb.

In 1760, he was given the title of baron, and in 1766, he was promoted to Lieutenant Field Marshal for his services in prosecuting the wars. Mikašinović was the first Serb officer to receive the noble title of baron without renouncing Eastern Orthodoxy in favour of Roman Catholicism.

At the Serbian Orthodox Church Council of 1769, Mikašinović did not support the Austrian candidate for archbishop, but favoured the metropolitan bishop of Eparchy of Gornji Karlovac Danilo Jakšić, who protected Serbian national interests in the empire. For this reason, Mikašinović was immediately sent from Osijek to Karlovac. His activities and writing were monitored. Then, in 1771, he was suddenly dismissed from the army. Mikašinović moved to Koprivnica, where he died in 1774. He was 79.

== Legacy ==
A biography of Baron Mihajlo Mikašinović was published in 2014, thanks to his living relative and editor Branko Mikasinovich, author (Đuro Zatezalo) and translator (Marjorie Mikasen).

== Sources ==
- Horvat, Anđela (1977). "O baroku u srednjoj Podravini". Podravski zbornik (3). Koprivnica Municipal Museum. ISSN 0350-3372.
