= Emmerich Blagoevich =

Austrian general born 1784

Emmerich Freiherr von Blagoevich
- Born: 1784; Vienna, Archduchy of Austria
- Died: 21 January 1850 (aged 65–66); Vienna, Austrian Empire
- Military career
- Allegiance: Habsburg Monarchy; Austrian Empire
- Branch: Army
- Service years: 1800–1848
- Rank: Feldmarschalleutnant
- Wars: War of the Sixth Coalition; Battle of Hanau; Battle of Bar-sur-Aube; Battle of Arcis-sur-Aube; Hungarian Revolution of 1848; Siege of Petrovaradin

Emmerich Freiherr von Blagoevich (1784 – 21 January 1850) was a Lieutenant Field Marshal of the Austrian Empire.

== Biography ==
Blagojevich was born to a wealthy Serb family in Vienna in 1784. He joined the Imperial-Royal Army as a graduate cadet of a military college in 1800. In 1809, he was promoted to the rank of captain. Blagoevich particularly distinguished himself at the Battle of Hanau in 1813 and the Battle of Bar-sur-Aube in 1814, and was wounded at the Battle of Arcis-sur-Aube that same year. He was awarded the Military Order of Maria Theresa in 1815. In 1820 his social status was elevated to Freiherr; in 1829 he became a colonel and in 1835 he was made General major; and in 1844 he became Field Marshal Lieutenant of the Military and Border District in Bukovina. He was promoted to commander-general in Slavonia in 1848. After the Revolution of 1848, he was criticized because of his behavior in the fortress Petrovaradin, which during the battle fell into the hands of the insurgents. He was court-martialed and retired. He died in Vienna on 21 January 1850.

== Bibliography ==
- L. Hirtenfeld; Hirtenfeld-Meynert 1; N.A. Vienna; Wurzbach.

PUBLICATION: ÖBL 1815–1950, Bd. 1 (Lfg. 1, 1954), p. 91
