= Jovan Muškatirović =

Serbian author, lawyer and educator

Jovan Muškatirović (Serbian Cyrillic: Јован Мушкатировић, German: Johann Muskatirovich; 1743 in Senta – 1809 in Buda) was a Serbian author, lawyer and educator who wrote in Serbian, Hungarian and Latin.

== Biography ==
Muškatirović was born in 1743 into a Serb family in the town of Senta, which at the time was part of the Habsburg Military Frontier. From 1764 to 1766 he attended the Protestant Lycee at Pozun (Bratislava) before entering the law school of the University of Pest. In 1769 he graduated among the top of his class.

At the time legal education gained even greater significance following Maria Theresa's Decree on the Legal Profession in 1769. Up until that point, the representation of clients in front of the state administration bodies and the high courts was performed by poorer noblemen or priests, many of whom did not have the proper professional training. Under the Imperial decree, the task of a barrister could only be carried out by those with a law degree and a successfully completed Bar exam, and only after they had been sworn in by a proper government agency. This regulation was in effect throughout the Empire. In southern Hungary, this decree led to the creation of a distinct class of lawyers, within which the leading figures were Serbs. This was the result of a number of circumstances. First of all, positions in the county administration and judiciary were reserved for Hungarians, who gladly chose state service, since it offered more security and a solid income. Other law graduates, among them Serbs, were obligated to face the challenges of a private law practice. In 1773 (only four years after the issuing of the Decree), the first Serb lawyer, Jovan Muškatirović of Senta, was sworn in. He immediately saw his mission in life both in literature and in promoting education for his people. He was influenced by the Age of Enlightenment and personally by Dositej Obradović.

The ethnic composition of the two cities, Buda and Pest, was complex in the late eighteenth century. Ethnic identity was a matter of personal choice, and during the early decades of assimilation, many inhabitants, especially writers and lawyers were bilingual and trilingual with multiple ethnic loyalties. Mihály Vitkovics/Mihailo Vitković wrote in Hungarian and Serbian, Jovan Muškatirović, then a member of the city council, wrote in Latin and Old Church Slavonic as well, and many others spoke and wrote in German, Hungarian, Romanian, Serbian and Latin, besides their Old Church Slavonic.

The most important work of Muškatirović was his collection of Serbian proverbs, "Pričite iliti po prostomu poslovice tjemze sentencije iliti rječenija", published in Vienna in 1787 before Vuk Karadžić began compiling proverbs and national epic songs.

As a promoter of education he had a prominent place in the struggle against traditionalism and superstition. In 1786 he published a treatise "Kratkoe razmislenije o prazdnici" (A Short Deliberation on Holidays), advocating a reduction in the number of religious holidays, an increase in the number of working days and, hence, an improvement of economic power of the nation. He also wrote health hazards of excessive fasting (at the time, fasting was prescribed for 200 days a year) and, about the need to boost agricultural production.

In Serbian eighteenth-century literature Zaharije Orfelin's authorship of "The Life of Peter the Great" was recorded for the first time in 1786 by Jovan Muškatirović. The illustrations of Peter's biography had been announced by Orfelin in 1772, but he began to produce them in 1774, and the whole enterprise was not completed until 1779, when the authorship of the book had been indubitably established. All this, however, was forgotten until Jovan Muškatirović brought it to the attention of his literary circle seven years later.

He died at Buda, 1809.

== See also ==
- List of Habsburg Serbs
