= Bogić Vučković =

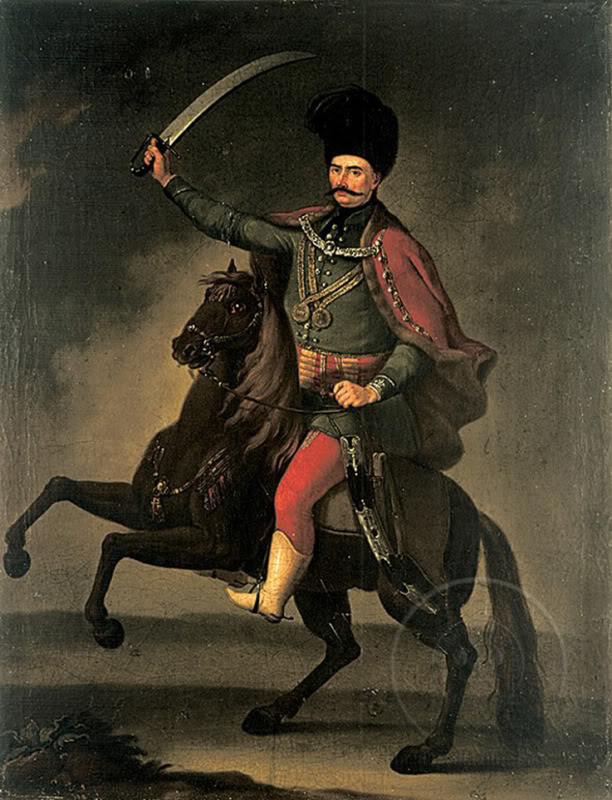
- Painting by Arsa Teodorović (1812).
- Born: Bogić Vučković Petrović Stratimirović; Trebinje hinterland, Sanjak of Herzegovina, Bosnia Eyalet, Ottoman Empire (now Bosnia and Herzegovina)
- Died: Kulpin, Kingdom of Hungary (now Serbia)
- Military career
- Allegiance: Habsburg Monarchy
- Service years: 1737–39
- Awards: Ennobled

Bogić Vučković Stratimirović (Serbian Cyrillic: Богић Вучковић Стратимировић, fl. 1735–1745) was a Serbian rebel leader in the Sanjak of Herzegovina who organized an uprising in 1737, during the Austro-Russian–Turkish War (1735–1739). He was from the Trebinje hinterland, in Herzegovina, the son of Vučko Petrović and grandson of Petar Stratimirović. Early on, he moved to the Kingdom of Serbia (1718–1739). He is mentioned in documents as a merchant from Kragujevac. He bought an attestation from the Republic of Ragusa that he descended from Stracimir Balšić, the Lord of Zeta, then appeared in autumn 1737 at the Habsburg deputy commander's office in Sremski Karlovci, with Aleksa Milišević, presenting themselves as nobility and Vučković stressed that he had readied the Montenegrin peoples to help the Austrian Emperor. Vučković and his brothers organized an uprising in Herzegovina in 1737 during Austrian-Turkish conflicts in the Balkans, at the same time helping the Austrians. After the Capture of Belgrade (1739), for their efforts, he and his brothers were awarded Austrian noble titles and granted the village of Kulpin which they settled. Stefan Stratimirović is a descendant of his.

== Sources ==
- Ǵorǵe Ǵ STRATIMIROVIĆ; Bogić Vučković STRATIMIROVIĆ (1901). О Б. В. Стратимировићу.
