= Crepović noble family (Transylvania) =

Serb noble family

Crepović Цреповић
- Noble house
- Country: Habsburg Monarchy
- Titles: ban of Severin

The Crepović family (Serbian Cyrillic: Цреповић, pl. Crepovići / Цреповићи) was among the most notable Serb noble families in the mid-16th century in Hungary, with their head, Nikola Crepović (Serbian Cyrillic: Никола Цреповић; Hungarian: Cserepovics Miklós; Turkish: Cerepoviki). He was among the Serb nobility living in John Zápolya's part of Hungary that participated in the talks in Horgoš in 1542 to send a representative to King Ferdinand, in the name of the Serbs, to present their requests. In 1550, he was a colonel in the army of Petar Petrović, a relative of Zápolya, who was in armed conflict with fra Juraj Utješenović-Martinušević, a Dalmatian monk and later bishop of Nagyvárad, and the Cardinal, the main individuals of Zápolya's court. With an army of 4,000 Serbs, and as many "Turks", Crepović took six cities and burnt down Csanad. In the battle around Csanad against fra Juraj, some 6,500 Serbs and Turks were captured, while Crepović managed to save himself, the cities which he had taken were returned. In 1551, he was among Ferdinand's voivodes that received a mercenary salary; at the end of that year he was in the army of fra Juraj, while in December he was at the top of the defence of Timișoara when the Ottomans attacked, and managed to capture him, though he was later released from prison. In 1556 he entered among the 16 selected magnates in the State Council, quickly becoming the ban of Severin. Katarina, the younger daughter of Nikola, married nobleman Valentino Terek, while the older daughter Jelena married Wallachian voivoda Peter the Younger (r. 1558–59). King John Sigismund Zápolya (r. 1540–70) adopted Jelena as a sister, and guested the wedding, but she later divorced and married Vladimir the Moscovian.

== See also ==
- Crepović noble family (Pomoravlje)
- Crepović noble family (Herzegovina)
- Jovan Nenad
- Peter Petrovics
- Sava Temišvarac
- Pavle Bakić
- Deli-Marko
- Starina Novak
- Jakšić noble family
- Vuk Grgurević
- Petar Ovčarević
- John Sigismund Zápolya

== Sources ==
- Aleksa Ivić; Dušan Mrđenović; Dušan Spasić; Aleksandar Palavestra (1987). Rodoslovne tablice i grbovi srpskih dinastija i vlastele. Belgrade: Nova knjiga.
- Radovan Samardžić (1994). Mehmed Sokolovitch: le destin d'un grand vizir. L'AGE D'HOMME. pp. 40–. ISBN 978-2-8251-0515-3.
