= Demeter Radossevich von Rados =

Austrian nobleman and general

Demeter Freiherr Radossevich von Rados
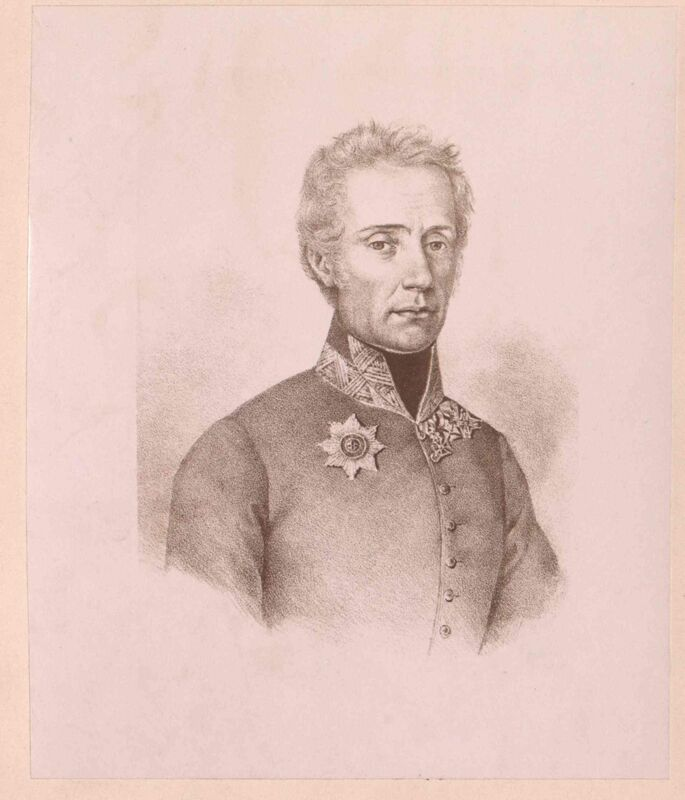
- Born: July 1767; Medak, Croatian Military Frontier
- Died: 4 June 1835 (aged 67); Vienna, Austria-Hungary
- Military career
- Allegiance: Austrian Empire
- Branch: Imperial-Royal Army
- Service years: 1783–1835
- Rank: Feldmarschalleutnant
- Awards: Order of Leopold

Demeter Freiherr Radossevich von Rados (July 1767 – 4 June 1835) was an Austrian nobleman, and an imperial general during the Napoleonic Wars.

== Biography ==
He was born in Medak, in the Croatian Military Frontier, into a Serbian military family ennobled in 1773 with the predicate "von Rados." In 1783 he enrolled in an Austrian military cadet school from where he naturally progressed in rank. He was promoted to captain in 1796, then major sometime in the early 1800s; lieutenant colonel in 1807; Colonel sometime between 1807 and 1813 when he became major general. In the battles of Aspern-Essling and Wagram he showed exceptional bravery and was consequently awarded the Knight's Cross of the Military Order of Maria Theresa. He continued to distinguish himself in battles, namely the Battle of Leipzig, and following the Treaty of Paris he was awarded both the Knight's Cross of the Order of Leopold in 1816. In 1823 his social status was further elevated to Freiherr, the equivalent of baron. From 26 June 1825 to 4 June 1835 he was sent to many places. Though the last years of his life he was in command of all the forces in Slavonia and Srem. He was given charge of the famed Slavonian Infantry Regiment No. 53 from 1825 to 1835. His final posting was Vice President of the Aulic War Council

He died in Vienna on 4 June 1835. In 1807 married with his beloved Antonia Bosnyak aliter Rudnyák de Bácsfa et Magyarbél (1782 - 19.9.1832 Peterwardein), a daughter of royal council & archivist Andreas Bosnyak de Rudnyak et Magyarbél. They had 5 children. His son Theodor was a major.

== Promotions ==
- Major:
- Oberstleutnant (Lieutenant colonel): 1807
- Oberst (Colonel):
- Generalmajor (General Major): 10 August 1813
- Feldmarschalleutnant (Field Marshal Lieutenant): 17 December 1829

== Posts and Offices (Army, Politics, Court) ==
- Commanding General ad interim in the Banat-Warasdin-Karlstadt Military Border: September 1831- February 1832
- Commanding General in Slavonia and Syrmia: February 1832 – June 1834
- Vice President of Hofkriegsrat or the Aulic War Council: June 1834 – 4 June 1835

== Elevation of Social Status ==
- Plain nobility: 15 May 1773 (with predicate: "von Rados")
- Freiherr: 1823

== Orders, Awards, Honorary Appointments (Austria) ==
- Order of Leopold – KC: 4 May 1816
- Silver Cross of the Order of Civil Merit 1813/14: 26 May 1815
- Colonel-Proprietor of the Infantry Regiment N°53: 1825 – 4 June 1835
- Imperial Royal Privy Councillor: 1832

== Orders, Awards, Honorary Appointments (Foreign Countries) ==
- France: Military Order of St. Louis – Commander Cross (CC): 5 April 1816
- Russia: Order of St. Anne 1st class: 1815

== Sources ==
Frank 4, p. 134 | MilSchem | Wrede 1, p. 485 | WZ, 14 October 1813, 28 May 1815, 18 October 1815, 31 May 1816, 12 September 1816 | Zivkovic, Heerführer, p. 67, 68 |

VÍTEK, Peter - PETROVITSOVÁ, Maria - PETROVITS, Silvia M.. Mýty a skutočnosť o rode Bosnijak de Rudnijak. Bratislava, 2009, pp. 25, 27-29.
