= Ignaz Stojanich =

Austrian general (died 1807)

- Died: 23 December 1807; Agram, Austrian Empire
- Military career
- Allegiance: Habsburg Monarchy; Austrian Empire
- Branch: Army
- Rank: General-major
- Wars: Revolt of Horea, Cloșca, and Crișan

Ignaz Stojanich von Selin also written Ignaz Stoianich (Military Frontier, around 1741 - Agram, Habsburg Empire, 23 December 1807) was an Austrian general-major.

He participated in the quelling of a Revolt of Horea, Cloșca and Crișan in Transylvania in 1784.

In 1798 Stojanich commanded the Petrovaradin Krajina Infantry Regiment no. 9 of the Slavonian Generalat of the Military Frontier, headquartered in Mitrovica.

After receiving a high rank in the military it was customary for the recipient Ignaz Stojanich to have his social status elevated. On 17 July 1801, he became a baron with the predicate "von Selin".

He retired from the military in 1807, the year he died on 23 December in Agram, now Zagreb.
