= Paul Dimich =

Austrian nobleman and general (1722–1802)

Paul Dimich von Papilla
- Born: 1722; Arad, Hungary (Habsburg monarchy, now Romania)
- Died: August 28, 1802 (aged 79–80); Temisvar, Habsburg monarchy (now Romania)
- Military career
- Allegiance: Habsburg monarchy
- Branch: Imperial-Royal Army
- Service years: 1749–1790s
- Rank: Major General
- Conflicts: War of Austrian Succession; Seven Years' War; Austro-Turkish War (1788–1791); Battle of Orșova (1788)
- Awards: Knight's Cross of the Military Order of Maria Theresa

Paul Dimich von Papilla (1722 – 28 August 1802) was an Austrian nobleman and general in the Imperial-Royal Army.

== Biography ==
Born in Arad, Hungary (Habsburg monarchy, now Romania) of Serbian descent, Paul Dimich joined the Slavonian border guards in 1749 when he was 18 years old. He participated in the War of Succession, in which he advanced as far as the rank of captain, attended the siege of Ingolstadt, the battles of Striegau and Trautenau, and participated in the new organization that took place after the Peace of Aix-la-Chapelle in the Banat Military Frontier. Well before the beginning of the Seven Years' War, he was made major in the Slavic Gradiskaner regiments.

At the beginning of 1757, Dimich joined the Imperial Russian Army under the command of Field marshal Prince Apraxin, ordered to take part in their operations. In the battle of Silesian Wars, namely the Groß-Jägerndorf on 30 August 1757, Dimich made a particular impression. The first meeting of the Russian Corps had already been set back; the second was starting to get confused. While a village was being set ablaze by the Russians, Dimich noticed that there were large gaps in the ranks of the opposing enemy army. He immediately made up his mind to take advantage of this situation. He then stood in front of a few battalions of Russian grenadiers, asked them in their language to follow him, and, at the head of the troop with enthusiasm about him, attacked the enemy Prussians with bayonets so successfully that they immediately had to give way. With this victorious Attaque (attack), the Russians had gained time to regroup and also proceeded to further attack; this, in fact, decided the outcome of the battle. The Russian Général en Chef, Generals Liven and General Fermor told Dimich that the success of the day was mainly due to his determination.

In the following year (1758) he advanced to lieutenant colonel and distinguished himself again at Gottesgab. In the Battle of Landshut (June 23, 1760) he forced the heights of Passendorf and Reichshemmersdorf, drove out the enemy, captured the commander Colonel Le Noble and captured the guns and tents. When the trenches were opened in front of Glatz, he commanded the left-wing and was injured. Dimich was rewarded for his armed deeds in the "7th Promotion" (on 30 April 1762) by the Knight's Cross of the Military Order of Maria Theresa and a "diploma" in 1765 elevated to the status of baron. In 1768 he joined the Brooder Regiment. In 1773 he was promoted to colonel and commandant and in 1783, advanced to major general. During the Turkish war, Dimich was in Wartensleben’s corps in the Banat and stood with his troops at Schupanek (Szupany) to prevent the Turks from entering the country. He fought back the Turks several times in June and July 1788 but was finally forced to give way to the far superior enemy. When the war was over, Dimich retired and lived in Temisvar, where he died at the age of 80 in 1802.

== See also ==
His contemporaries at the time:

- Arsenije Sečujac
- Paul von Radivojevich
- Paul Davidovich
- Karl Paul von Quosdanovich
- Mathias Rukavina von Boynograd
- Josef Philipp Vukassovich
- Peter Duka von Kadar
