= Arsenije Sečujac =

Austrian general (1720–1814)

Arsenije Sečujac Арсеније Сечујац Arsenius Feiherr Seczujacz von Heldenfeld
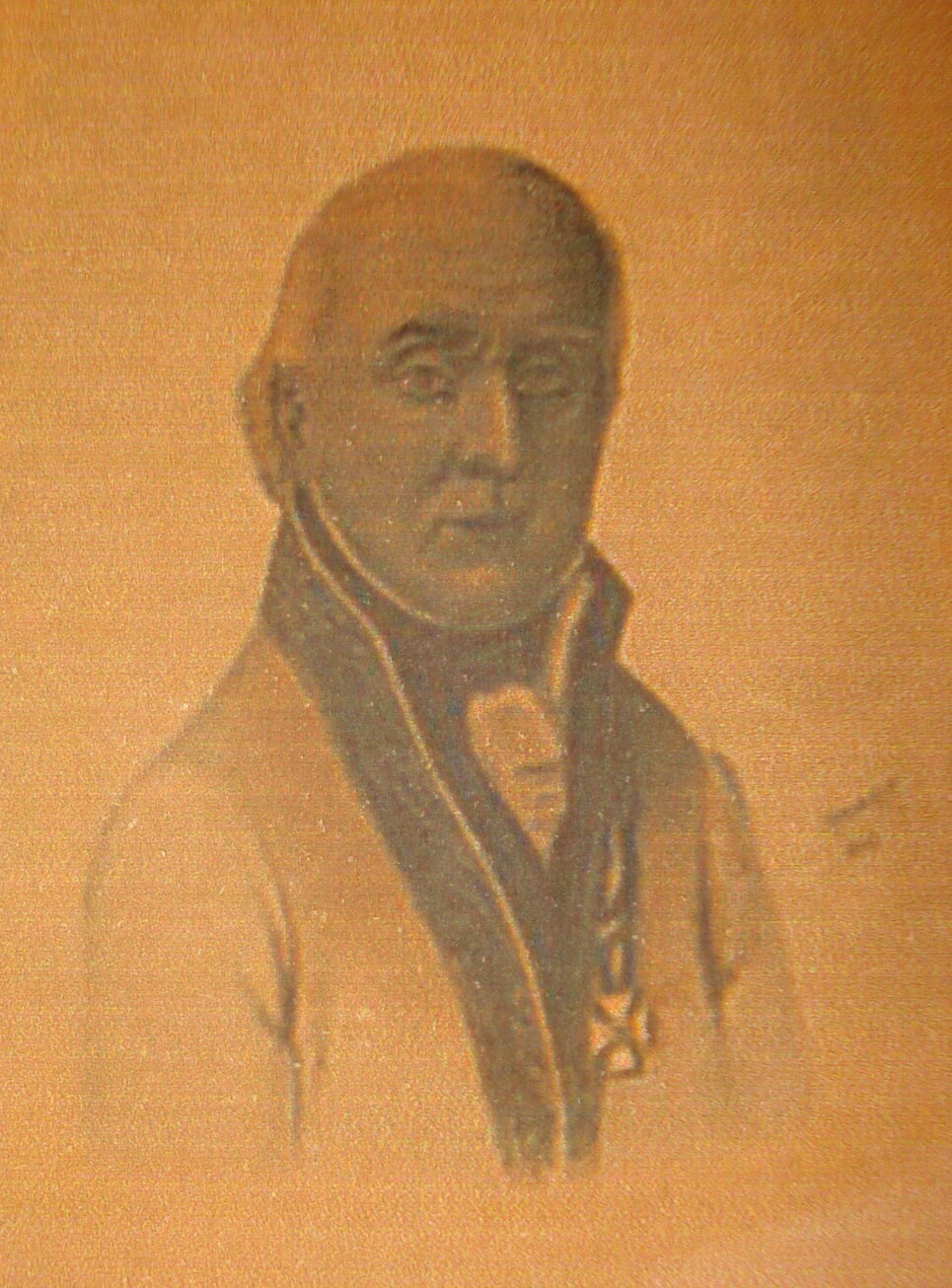
- Born: 1720; Eastern Syrmia, Slavonian Military Frontier, Habsburg monarchy (modern Serbia)
- Died: 13 January 1814 (aged 93–94); Vienna, Austrian Empire
- Military career
- Allegiance: (Habsburg monarchy) Habsburg Austria
- Branch: Army
- Service years: 1741–1783
- Rank: major (ca. 1755); oberstleutnant (1765); oberst (1773); generalmajor (1783)
- Conflicts: Battle of Piacenza, battle of Kolin, battle of Landeshut (1760): War of the Austrian Succession; Seven Years' War; War of the Bavarian Succession
- Awards: Military Order of Maria Theresa, Knight (1762)

Arsenije Sečujac (Serbian Cyrillic: Арсеније Сечујац, German: Arsenius Feiherr Seczujacz von Heldenfeld; 1720 – 13 January 1814) was a Serbian Habsburg general who earned the rank of major general at the very end of his military career and was awarded the Knight's Cross of the Military Order of Maria Theresa, the highest Monarchy decoration, in 1762.

== Biography ==
=== Early life ===
An ethnic Serb, Sečujac was born in 1720, somewhere in Syrmia, most likely in Eastern Syrmia (in modern Serbia), which at the time was part of the Slavonian Military Frontier (where the Slavonia-Petrovaradin Military Infantry Regiment was established later, in 1747). His father was Đorđe (or Georgije), a Habsburg military commander, and his mother was named Ana Stanisavljević. Two of his brothers also served in the military.

=== Military career ===
Sečujac joined the army in 1741 as a cadet in the Stara Gradiška infantry unit, of the Slavonian Military Frontier and fought in many battles during several wars (War of the Austrian Succession, Seven Years' War, War of the Bavarian Succession). During the first years of the Seven Years' War he became a major and in 1762 he was awarded the Knight's Cross of the Military Order of Maria Theresa and promoted to lieutenant colonel. He received noble status in 1763.

Having succeeded the noble status from his father, who had received the ennobling predicate "von Heldenfeld" (Serbo-Croatian: Heldenfeldski), Sečujac was elevated to baron on 29 December 1767 (and henceforth known as Baron Seczujacz von Heldenfeld). During his lifetime, he served in several garrisons or military bases, ending his career as commanding officer of the 66th Slavonian-Brod Military Frontier Infantry Regiment, a unit which he took over as colonel in 1777.

A chancellery was established, in which the first counselor was bishop (eparch) Petar Petrović of the Archdiocese of Arad; on November 17, the same year, the counselor was general-major and baron Arsenije Sečujac; other notable members were Mihailo Maksimović, Uroš Nestorović, Teodor Avramović.

A captaincy which he established was based in Bela Crkva, but was short-lived, disestablished in 1776.

He headed a political group which advocated unity of the Serbian people. He was a supporter of Dositej Obradović.

At the very end of his military career, on 24 February 1783, he was promoted to the rank of major general, but he retired on the 10 April that year.

He died at the age of 93 in Vienna in 1814.

== See also ==
- Sečujac, surname
- Jeronim Ljubibratić
- Paul Davidovich
- Gavrilo Rodić
- Svetozar Borojević
- Paul von Radivojevich
