= Petar Ovčarević =

Serb hajduk and river flotilla commander

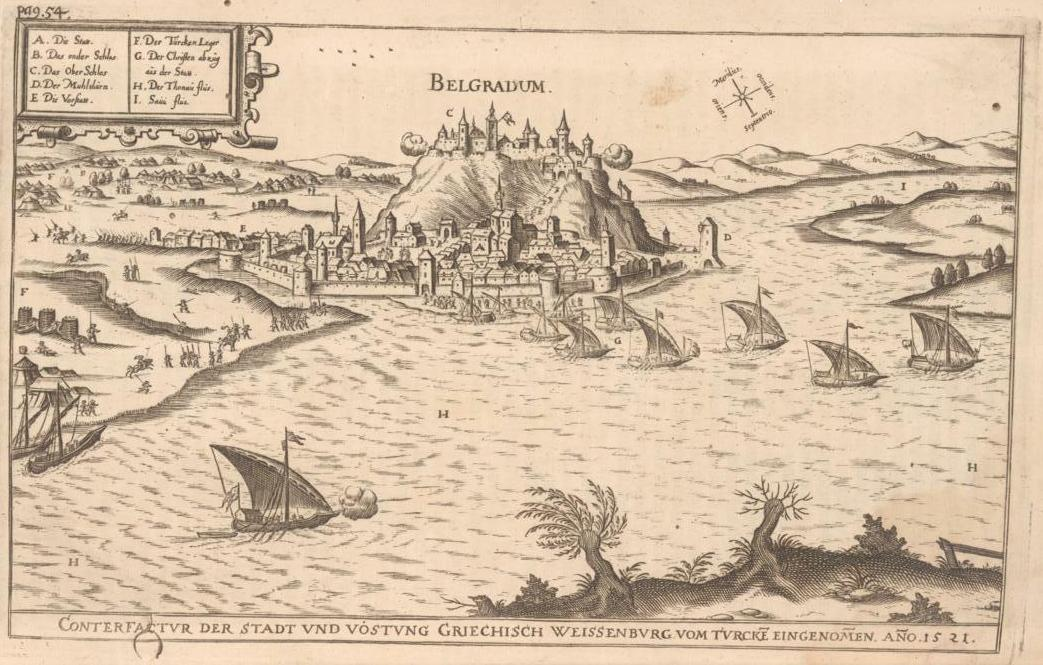
Belgrade Fortress during the Ottoman siege in 1521. Ovčarević was the main commander of the Hungarian river flotilla during the siege, which ended in Ottoman victory.

Petar Ovčarević (Serbian Cyrillic: Петар Овчаревић; fl. 1521–41) was an Ottoman Serb and later Hungarian river flotilla commander, who during his Ottoman service spied and informed the Christian army on the intentions and movements of the Ottoman army. His last years were spent in the Eastern Hungarian Kingdom, as one of the most notable magnates.

The past of this man is characteristic for the era during which he lived. It is apparent that he was of rare skills when dealing with people. His appearance and holding was sure to instill trust. With these traits of his he managed to emerge among the most notable of our [Serb] people...

–D. Popović

Petar Ovčarević hailed from Belgrade, and was a hajduk. As a youngster he was captured by the Ottomans, but managed to have himself freed and join the Ottoman army. He for long served the Ottomans, then joined Hungarian service. He was a commander of the Šajkaši (Danube river flotilla) in Zemun, and during the Siege of Belgrade (1521) was the main commander of the Šajkaši in Belgrade. After surviving the siege, which ended in Ottoman takeover, and vacillating for a time, he joined the Ottomans and became a confidant of Ottoman general and sanjak-bey of Belgrade, Bali Bey Jahjapašić. He became a Martolos commander, commanding Serbs, based by the Belgrade rivers, inhabiting their own quarter and commanding a galley fleet. His unit was entrusted with the protection of Ottoman ferries on the Sava and Danube.

Through Pavle Bakić, Ovčarević came into contact with Hungarian commander Pál Tomori, and helped the safe transfer of Bakić and his followers into Hungarian territory. He was a friend of Bakić, who seems to have assisted his secret crossing into Hungary a few months prior to the Battle of Mohács (29 August 1526). It seems that his aid to Bakić led to loss of confidence, according to D. Popović, as the Serb crew was replaced by an Ottoman one. All this time he was in confidential service to both King Ferdinand I and John Zápolya (rival kings of Hungary) and also representatives of other states, informing them of affairs in the Ottoman Empire. After Bali Bey's death, he rose further in rank and became the second-in-command and adviser of Bali Bey's younger brother and successor Mehmed Bey Jahjapašić, evidence of the very high trust he enjoyed. He greatly helped the Christian side in the war with the Ottomans by spying and sending secret reports to Hungarian commanders on the intentions and movements of the Ottoman army. Ovčarević was explicitly mentioned during the defense of the Buda fortress when Ferdinand I attacked at the end of 1530. He led 800 Serb and Turkish soldiers who arrived at Buda via the Danube. In 1531 Ferdinand's main confidant in Belgrade, the Ragusan Michael Bocignolo, reported that Petar Ovčarević "participates in all consultation in the Belgrade Sanjak, especially those relating to the war, and that he for the second day informs him". Ovčarević informed Ferdinand through Bakić, whom he personally met, about affairs in the Ottoman Empire and Zapolya's country. In 1531 he and Stepko Vratković were in the company of Lasky, Zapolya's envoy, during negotiations with Rogendorf.

It is unknown when he crossed into Zapolya's country. He received nobility status, and was mentioned in 1540 as the owner of Solymos and one of the most notable magnates in Zapolya's lands. After the death of Zapolya, he was the tutor (or guardian) of minor king John Sigismund, alongside Queen Isabelle and monk Đorđe Utešinović, and likely the commander of the Šajkaši. In 1541 he influenced Queen Isabelle into leaving Buda.

His family, the Ovčarević, was one of the notable Serb noble families in Hungarian service in the 16th century. His kinsmen or descendants were Mihailo Ovčarević (fl. 1550–79), a Šajkaši commander, Dimitrije Ovčarević (fl. 1552–66), captain of Gyula, and Jovan Ovčarević (fl. 1557), an emissary.

== Sources ==
- Cerović, Ljubivoje; Stepanov, Ljubomir (2000). Srbi u Rumuniji. Savez Srba u Rumuniji. p. 26. ISBN 9789739965712.
- Čobeljić, Nikola (2003) [1999]. Društvene nauke o srbima u Mađarskoj: zbornik radova sa okruglog stola održanog 6-8. decembra 1998. Samouprava Srba u Mađarskoj. p. 52. ISBN 978-963-210-143-9.
- Čubrilović, Vasa (1974). Istorija Beograda: Stari, srednji i novi vek. Prosveta. pp. 263, 264, 325.
- Ivić, Aleksa (1929). Istorija srba u Vojvodini. Matica srpska. pp. 55, 56, 60, 61, 62, 111, 116, 123, 127, 151, 174, 176.
- Kalić-Mijušković, Jovanka (1967). Београд у средњем веку. Српска књижевна задруга. pp. 242–244.
- Kolundžija, Zoran (2008). Vojvodina: Od najstarijih vremena do velike seobe. Prometej. pp. 214–216. ISBN 9788651503064.
- Popović, Dušan J. (1957). Srbi u Vojvodini (1): Od najstarijih vremena do Karlovačkog mira 1699. Matica srpska. pp. 158–159.
- Samardžić, Radovan (1987). Sulejman i Rokselana. Jugoslavijapublik. pp. 64, 107, 275, 430. ISBN 9788671210171.
- Stojkovski, Boris (2015). Đura Hardi (ed.). "The cultural and historical heritage of Vojvodina in the context of classical and medieval studies". Novi Sad: Filozofski fakultet. pp. 205–222.
- Vasić, Milan (1967). Martolosi u jugoslovenskim zemljama pod turskom vladavinom. ANUBiH. pp. 46, 54, 55, 63, 159.
