= Dimitrije Ovčarević =

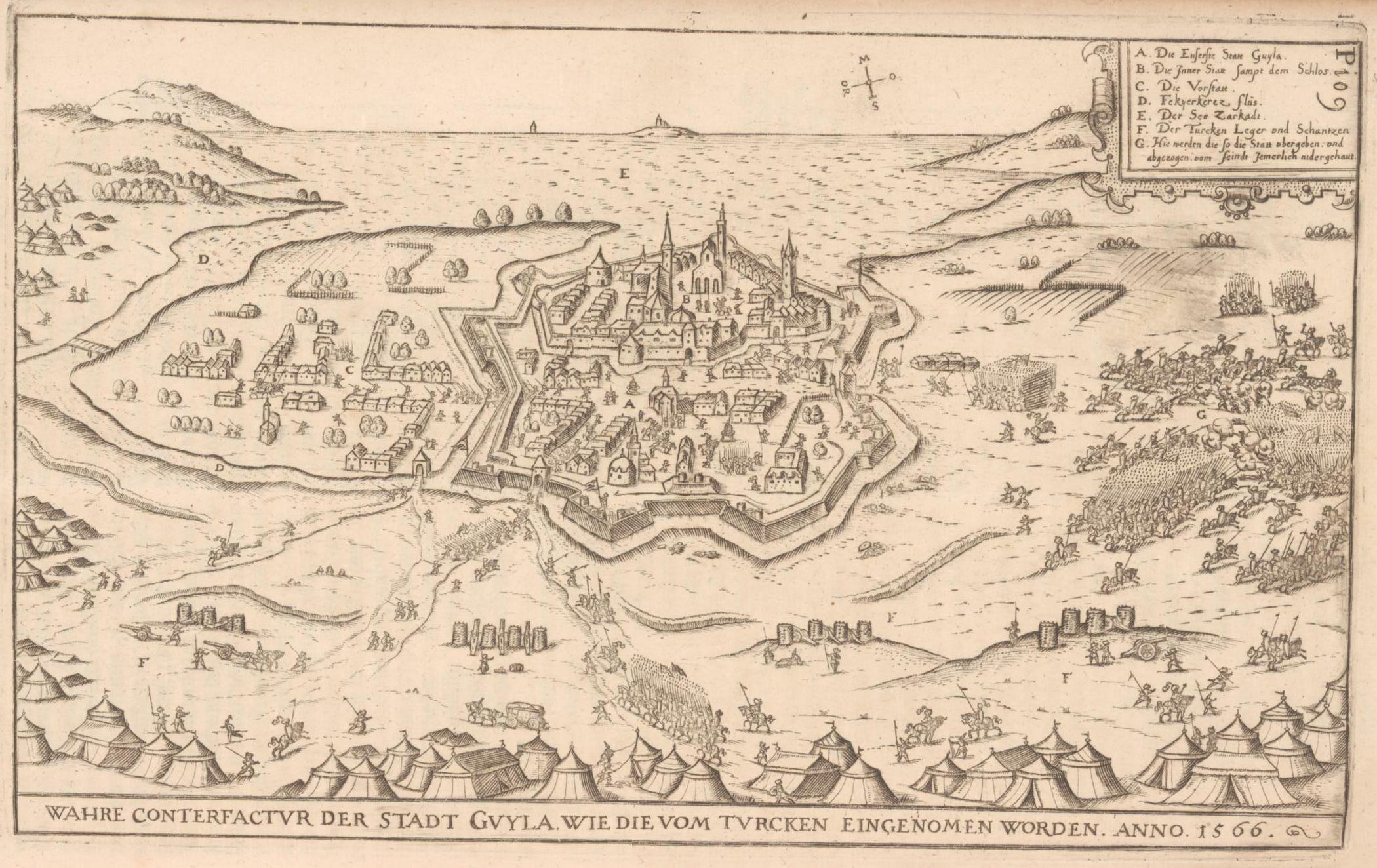
Ottoman camps outside Gyula during the 1566 campaign. Dimitrije Ovčarević, the captain of Gyula, died while defending the city.

Dimitrije Ovčarević (Serbian Cyrillic: Димитрије Овчаревић; fl. 1552–66) was a Habsburg Serb nobleman. Dimitrije Ovčarević belonged to the Ovčarević family, a notable Serb family in Habsburg service in the 16th century, and was a relative of the earlier Petar Ovčarević (fl. 1521–41), a Šajkaši commander and spy, and contemporaries Mihailo Ovčarević (fl. 1550–79), a Šajkaši commander, and Jovan Ovčarević (fl. 1557), an emissary. In 1552 he is mentioned as a leader of the Serbs in Banat, and in 1553 as the captain of Gyula. He was very loyal to King Ferdinand I and enjoyed his support. In 1556 it was planned that he travel to Vienna to meet Ferdinand for some business, however, the king asked him to postpone due to Ottoman movement. The same year he was given to govern a part of the Csanád chapter until its populating, in order to maintain troops. The king often used Church property, due to financial shortage, to pay the voivodes' expenses and troop maintenance. Dimitrije also held the estates of Kerekegyháza and Nagyfalu in the Temes County; Turegyház, Bócsar, Bikács and Szanád in the Torontál County; Mezőtakancs and Délegyháza in the Csanád County; Csokás, parts of Szentpéter, Fenlak, Variaș, Torny, Bata in the Arad County; and Marian and Kétegyháza in the Zărand County. The royal treasurer paid the maintenance of 85 cavalry, several dozen being under Dimitrije's command. In war-time this number increased significantly. Other captains mentioned in the muster were Vladislav Kerecseny, Pavle Beke, Franja Horvat and others alongside Dimitrije. When the Ottoman army set out on campaign in 1566, a part of the army attacked Transylvania and surrounded Gyula. Dimitrije fell while bravely defending the city. Many castellans and captains died during the Ottoman campaign of 1566. Shortly after his death, the city surrendered to the Ottomans. He was survived by his sister Margarita, who was married to Nikola Crepović, a respected Serb leader in Banat.

== Sources ==
- Ivić, Aleksa (1929). Istorija srba u Vojvodini. Izdanje matice srpske. pp. 177, 179, 186, 189.
- Kolundžija, Zoran (2008). Vojvodina: Od najstarijih vremena do velike seobe. Prometej. p. 216. ISBN 9788651503064.
- Popović, Dušan J. (1957). Srbi u Vojvodini (1): Od najstarijih vremena do Karlovačkog mira 1699. Matica srpska. p. 159.
- Stojkovski, Boris (2015). Đura Hardi (ed.). "The cultural and historical heritage of Vojvodina in the context of classical and medieval studies". Novi Sad: Filozofski fakultet. pp. 205–222.
