= Mihailo Ovčarević =

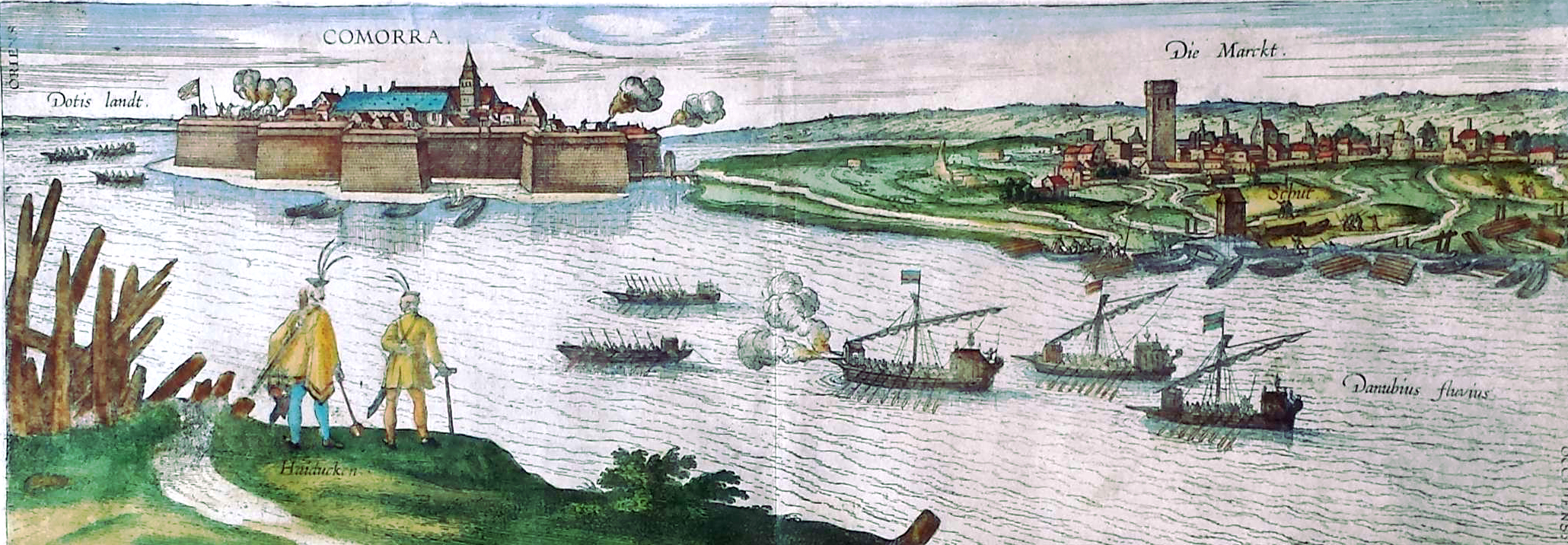
View of Komárno with chaikas, 1597. Mihailo Ovčarević was a vojvoda (commander) of the Šajkaši, the river flotilla that defended the Danube and Sava rivers against the Ottomans.

Mihailo Ovčarević (Serbian Cyrillic: Михаило Овчаревић; fl. 1550–79) was a Habsburg Serb vojvoda (commander) of the Šajkaši (river flotilla). Mihailo Ovčarević belonged to the Ovčarević family, a notable Serb family in Habsburg service in the 16th century, and was a relative of the earlier Petar Ovčarević (fl. 1521–41), a Šajkaši commander and spy, and contemporaries Dimitrije Ovčarević (fl. 1552–66), captain of Gyula, and Jovan Ovčarević (fl. 1557), an emissary. He is mentioned in 1550 as a vojvoda of the Šajkaši. After a denunciation, Emperor Ferdinand I had Mihailo imprisoned, where he stayed for several months until having proved his innocence. As compensation, Ferdinand I issued him a yearly 50 gold coins, which was then changed to 25. In 1557 he asked the War Council to appoint him a vojvoda in Komárno. It is unknown whether he succeeded. It seems that he continued living on his low pension which was not paid regularly; the payment issue is evident from his many appeals. He is last mentioned in 1579.

== Sources ==
- Ivić, Aleksa (1929). Istorija srba u Vojvodini. Izdanje matice srpske. pp. 177, 179, 186, 189.
- Kolundžija, Zoran (2008). Vojvodina: Od najstarijih vremena do velike seobe. Prometej. p. 216. ISBN 9788651503064.
- Popović, Dušan J. (1957). Srbi u Vojvodini (1): Od najstarijih vremena do Karlovačkog mira 1699. Matica srpska. p. 159.
- Stojkovski, Boris (2015). Đura Hardi (ed.). "The cultural and historical heritage of Vojvodina in the context of classical and medieval studies". Novi Sad: Filozofski fakultet. pp. 205–222.
