= Piri Mehmed Pasha Mosque =

Mosque in Silivri, Istanbul, Turkey

- Piri Mehmet Paşa Cami
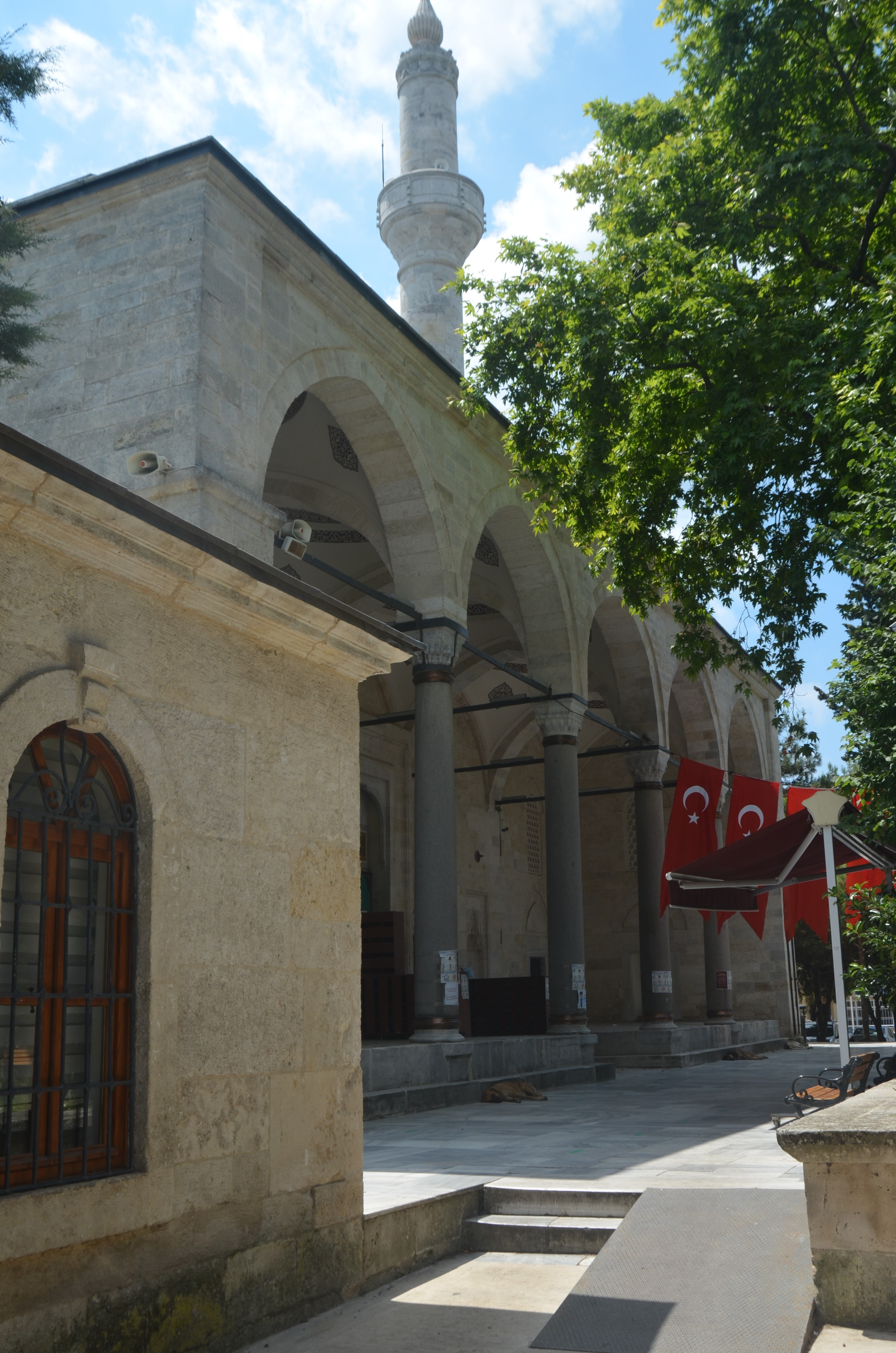

- Location of Piri Mehmed Pasha Mosque in Istanbul Province

Religion
- Affiliation: Islam
- District: Silivri
- Province: Istanbul

Location
- Country: Turkey
- Coordinates: 41.07345°N 28.24565°E

Architecture
- Type: Mosque
- Style: Islamic, Ottoman architecture
- Completed: 1530–1531

Specifications
- Domes: 1 main dome, 5 narthex domes, 2 side domes and 1 mihrab half dome
- Minaret: 1

Piri Mehmed Pasha Mosque (Turkish: Piri Mehmet Paşa Cami) is an Ottoman-era mosque in Silivri, Istanbul Province, Turkey, built in 1530–31 by Grand vizier Piri Mehmed Pasha.

== History ==
The mosque complex is located in the center of Silivri district of Istanbul Province, northwestern Turkey. It was commissioned by Ottoman Grand vizier Piri Mehmed Pasha (in office 1518–1523), and built in 937 AH (1530–31) according to the wall-hung inscription above the main gate. Here are various records and rumors about the architecture of the complex. The architect of the mosque is not known. In the period of the construction of the mosque complex, the chief architect was Acem (Esir) Ali ("Ali the Persian (Captive)").

== Architecture ==
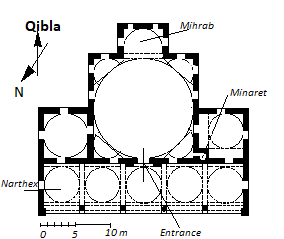
Floor plan of Piri Mehmed Pasha Mosque in Silivri (mid) and minbar, Istanbul (right).

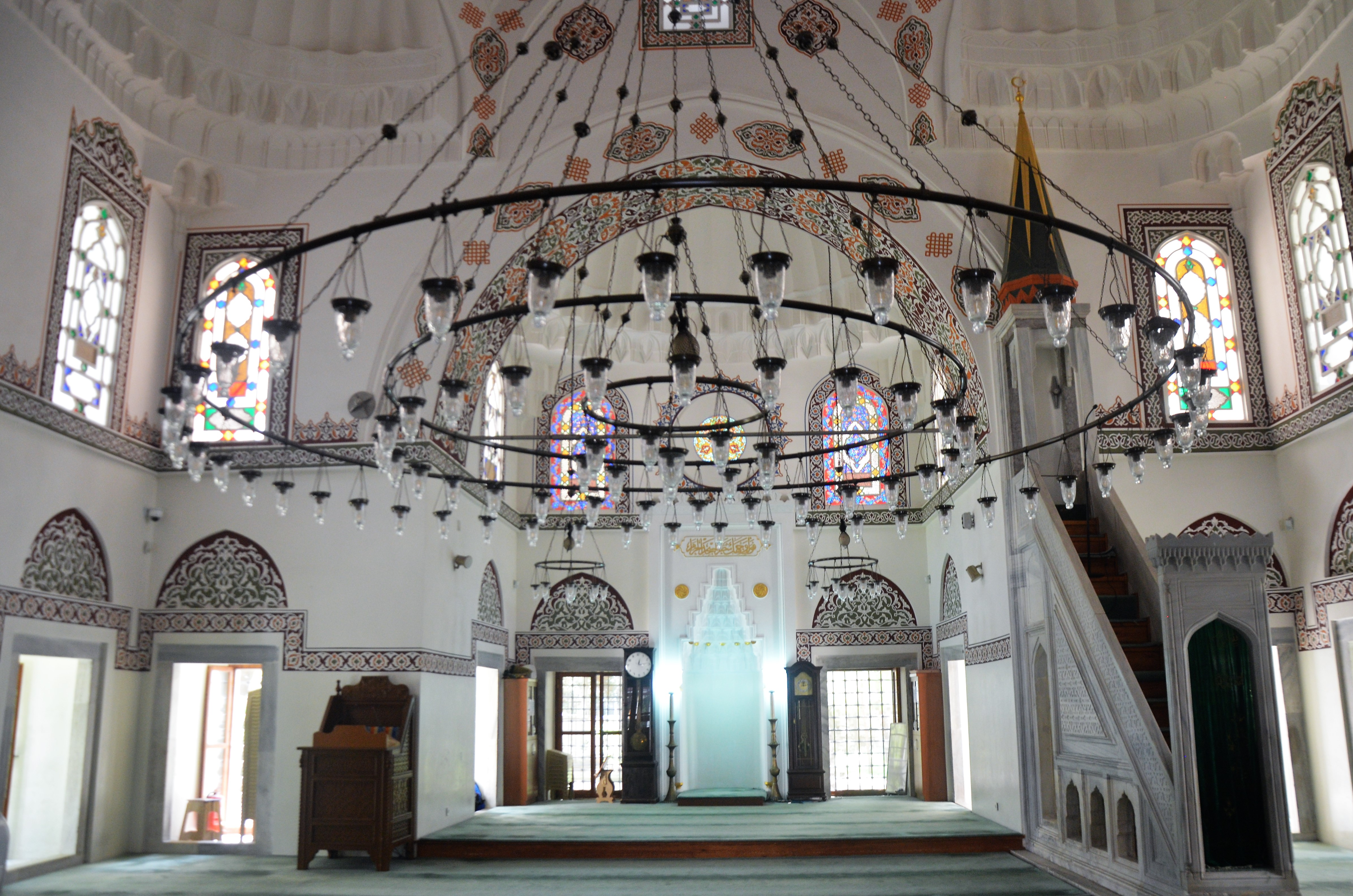
Mosque interior with mihrab (mid) and minbar (right).

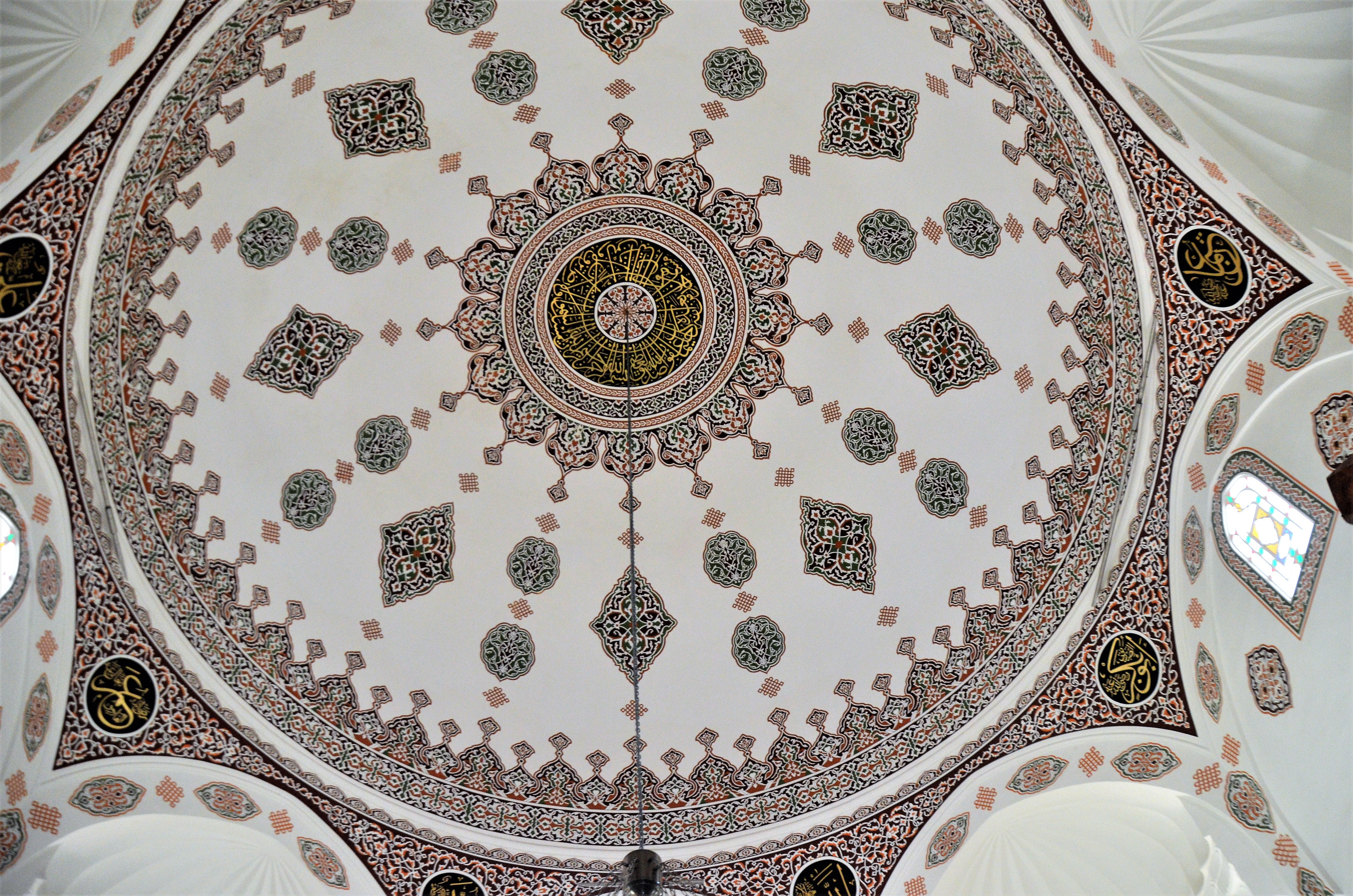
Decorated dome interior featuring in the center the Quran verse ʾĀyat al-Kursī ("The Throne Verse") in Arabic script.

The mosque is situated in the middle of a courtyard on a terrace. Built in ashlar, it has a square plan form topped with a lead-sheet covered dome of 11.90 m (39.0 ft) diameter. It has two lines of windows, the upper line windows are in pointed arch form and the ones below have rectangular form. The mihrab, situated in a stem, which is topped by a half dome, opens to the main prayer room by a large pointed arch. On two sides of the main prayer room, there are two domed cells, which have doors to the outside and the inside. Both cells have a window opening to the outside in the south, and a window opening to the narthex in the north. The mosque features a narthex with five pointed-arch spacings in front of the main entrance. The five domes of the narthex are carried by four columns with muqarnas capitals. The middle narthex dome is higher than the others. The narthex is flanked by walls with a window on both sides. The interior of the domes, arches, walls and particularly around the windows are decorated with hand-drawn figures. The interior of the main dome features the Quran vers ʾĀyat al-Kursī ("The Throne Verse"). The mosque has one minaret with a single balcony in the northwest, which is accessible from th mosque's inside. The minaret's base is original while the tower was re-built during the renovation works of the mosque complex, which were commissioned by the trustee Sâdeddin Bey and took place 1179 AH (1765–66), according to an inscription situated on both sides of the main gate.. In the middle of the courtyard, there is an octagonal shadirvan with pyramidal roof covered by zinc sheet. It was built during the restoration works of 1966–1971.

The mosque complex consisted of facilities such as guest house for travellers' stay up to three days, imaret, kitchen, dining room, woodshed, inn, infants' school, nine-room madrasa, orphanage and service building for soldiers returned from the Belgrade Fortress. In order to continue the activities of those facilities, about ten shops were endowed to the mosque complex for in addition to cropland, mill, well and farm.

The mosque underwent two major restorations in 1765 and 1895 as shown on inscriptions. The inscription of the restoration in 1313 AH (1895–96) is situated on the middle dome of the narthex. According to restoration records, the minaret is an example of Baroque architecture design.

The inn, which was used by traders for lodging, was built close to the mosque in the 18th century. The abreuvoir and the fountain in front of the inn were removed in the 1940s.

The fountain in the courtyard of the mosque, which is designed in mixture of the Baroque and Neoclassical Empire style, is named after Hacı İsmail Ağa. Another fountain, which is situated on the retaining wall at south of the courtyard, was relocated here in the 1990s from its initial place one street away.

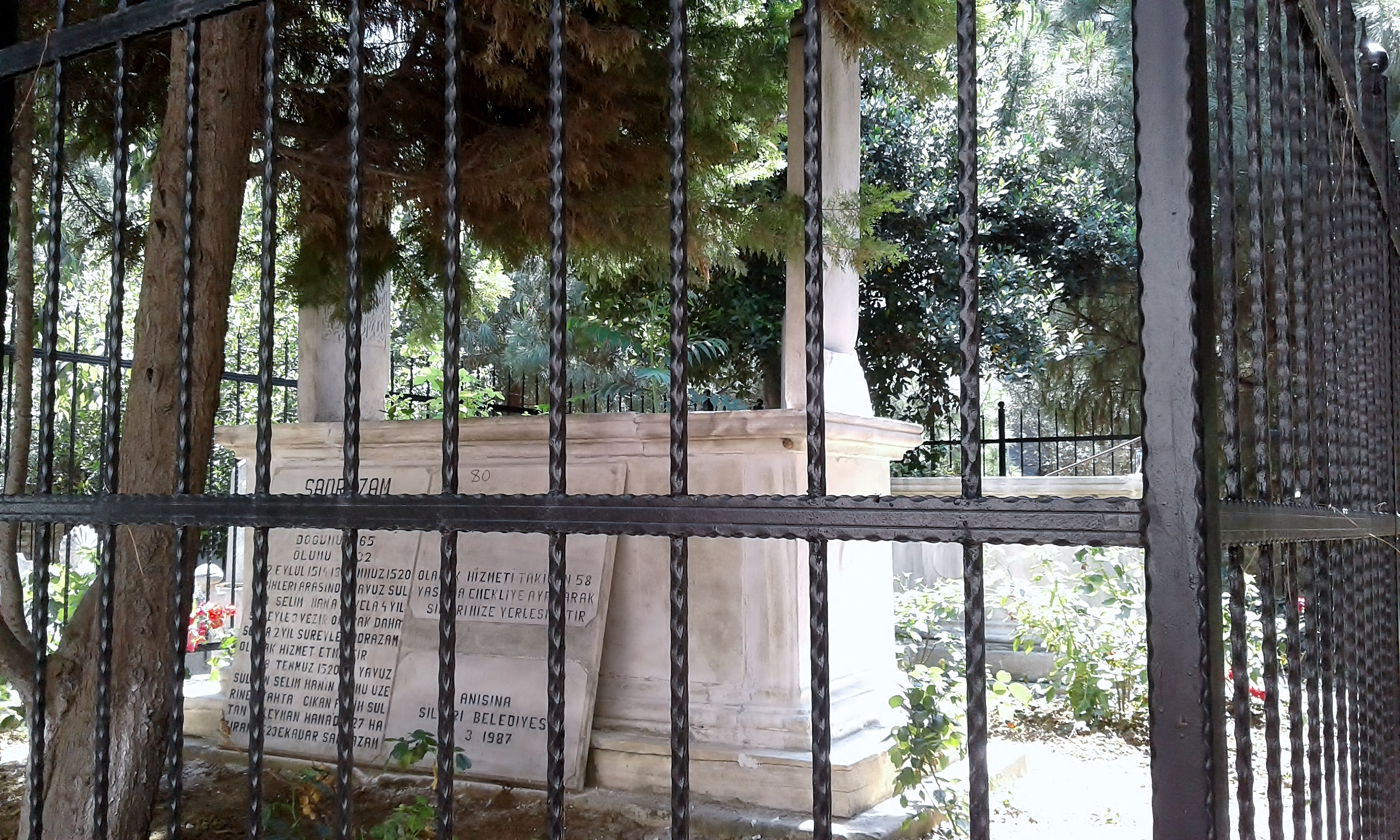
Sarcophagus of Grand vizier Piri Mehmed Pasha in the graveyard of the mosque.

The graveyard of the mosque complex is walled and located at the qibla side of the mosque. It initially occupied a wide area in the courtyard, but was reduced in a relative smaller place of 12 m × 23 m (39 ft × 75 ft) area during the restoration works by the Directorate General of Foundations. The marble sarcophagus of Piri Mehmed Pasha is situated in the northeast corner of the graveyard. The sarcophagus of his son Muhyiddin Mehmed Râşid Efendi is next to his grave.

== Today ==
Piri Mehmet Pasha Mosque took its recent outlook after the restoration works carried out by the Directorate General of Foundations between 1961 and 1971.

Only the mosque, as well as one room of the orphanage and the madrasa, each survived to today.

Latest restoration works of the mosque began in April 2013. On 3 June 2016, it was opened to worship again.
