= Jovan Ovčarević =

Habsburg Serb nobleman

Jovan Ovčarević (Serbian Cyrillic: Јован Овчаревић; fl. 1557) was a Habsburg Serb nobleman. He was a member of the Ovčarević family, a notable Serb family in Habsburg service in the 16th century, and was a kinsman or descendant of the earlier Petar Ovčarević (fl. 1521–41), a Šajkaši commander and spy, and relative of contemporaries Mihailo Ovčarević (fl. 1550–79), a Šajkaši commander, and Dimitrije Ovčarević (fl. 1552–66), the captain of Gyula. Jovan Ovčarević was mentioned as accompanying a mission to the sultan in 1557, being in the entourage of Vrančić and Franja Zaj while they were legates in Constantinople. Nothing more is known of him.

== Sources ==
- Ivić, Aleksa (1929). Istorija srba u Vojvodini. Izdanje matice srpske. p. 179.
- Kolundžija, Zoran (2008). Vojvodina: Od najstarijih vremena do velike seobe. Prometej. p. 216. ISBN 9788651503064.
- Popović, Dušan J. (1957). Srbi u Vojvodini (1): Od najstarijih vremena do Karlovačkog mira 1699. Matica srpska. p. 159.
- Stojkovski, Boris (2015). Đura Hardi (ed.). "The cultural and historical heritage of Vojvodina in the context of classical and medieval studies". Novi Sad: Filozofski fakultet. pp. 205–222.
