= Ovčarević =

Ovčarević (Serbian Cyrillic: Овчаревић) is a Serbian surname, derived from ovčar ("sheepdog"). The Ovčarević were a notable Serbian family in Habsburg service in the 16th century. It may refer to:

- Petar Ovčarević (fl. 1521–41), Habsburg Serb commander
- Mihailo Ovčarević (fl. 1550–79), Habsburg Serb commander
- Dimitrije Ovčarević (fl. 1552–66), Habsburg Serb commander
- Jovan Ovčarević (fl. 1557), Habsburg Serb emissary
