= Siege of Belgrade (1521) =

European battle

- Part of the Ottoman wars in Europe and Hungarian–Ottoman Wars
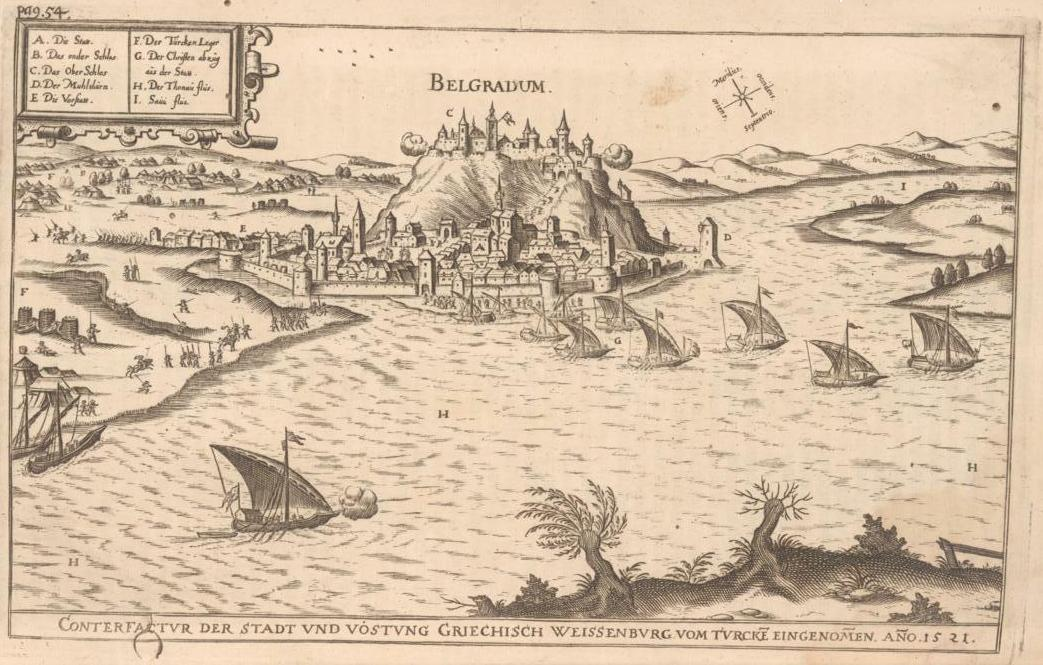
Date	25 June – 29 August 1521
Location	Nándorfehérvár, Kingdom of Hungary (present-day Belgrade, Serbia)
Result	Ottoman victory
Territorial changes	Ottoman conquest of Belgrade

Belligerents
Ottoman Empire	Kingdom of Hungary

Commanders and leaders
Suleiman I Gazi Husrev Bey; Piri Mehmed; Ahmed Pasha; Mustafa Pasha	Mihály Móré (WIA); Balázs Oláh (surrendered); Petar Ovčarević (surrendered)

Strength
100,000, of which 30,000 soldiers	700 soldiers

The siege of Belgrade (Hungarian: Nándorfehérvár ostroma) in 1521 is an event that followed as a result of the third major Ottoman attack on this Hungarian stronghold in the Ottoman–Hungarian wars at the time of the greatest expansion of the Ottoman Empire to the west. Ottoman Sultan Suleiman the Magnificent launched his army in mid-May 1521. The Hungarian state was almost in disarray and unable to effectively counter the Ottoman army.

== Background ==
Initially, nobody, including the sultan, actually knew the target of the campaign. Hain Ahmed Pasha, the rival of Piri Mehmed Pasha, who would later have a role in Piri's dismissal from the grand vizierate, suggested taking first Šabac, then cross the Sava and strike Buda. Piri argued that if they didn't capture Belgrade before attacking the Hungarian capital Buda, the Hungarians could cut them off in their return to Belgrade. The sultan preferred Ahmed's plan, but at the same time permitted Piri to besiege Belgrade with a small portion of the army. The sultan conquered Šabac, while Piri conquered Zemun fortress.

== Battle ==
The sultan then ordered Piri to lift the siege in Belgrade and join the bulk of the army as he started to build a bridge to cross the Sava. However: Piri, who had conquered Zemun and was besieging Belgrade with a small portion of the army, refused to lift the siege. Mustafa Ali complained that the sultan failed to congratulate Piri for Zemun, and sees Ahmed behind this decision; however, it is more likely that the sultan actually needed all forces in preparation to attack Buda. Next, the attempt to cross the Sava was a failure. The Sava flooded, so much as to make it impossible to cross the bridge to the other side. The sultan informed Piri that they would soon join him. Together, they captured the city, which was taken on 24 August. Whereas in Šabac the Turks slaughtered all the defenders, in Belgrade about 70 out of 700 defenders survived. Suleiman spared their lives. However, most of the Serbian inhabitants were deported to Istanbul.

The fall of Belgrade showed the inability of the Hungarian authorities to oppose the expansionist policies of the Ottoman Empire, which would show their supremacy in the Battle of Mohács plains in 1526. After the defeat and breakdown of Hungary, the leader of the Christian struggle against the Ottoman penetration of Europe would become the Habsburg monarchy, which would include Hungary. Belgrade would come under the rule of a Christian force only in 1688 when Maximilian of Bavaria conquered it for Austria.

== Post battle ==
When Selim I died in 1520, his son Suleiman became sultan of the Ottoman Empire. The Kingdom of Hungary, on the other hand, was almost in ruins. The Hungarian nobility was divided into numerous parties, and without a strong central government it could not unite in defense of the country. King Louis II of Hungary was weakened by numerous conflicts. The lower nobility clashed with the higher nobility and court circles, and the Voivode of Transylvania, John Zápolya, one of the wealthiest greats of his time, represented open opposition to the already weak regime of King Louis II. The faction that supported the Voivode of Transylvania was in constant conflict with the court circles. The king himself was a powerless figure in the hands of his ambitious associates. He often did not have the money for his own existence. On such occasions, it was not possible to strengthen the defense system at the southern border and to undertake any military campaigns.

== See also ==
- Ottoman Serbia

== Sources ==
- Bataković, Dušan T., ed. (2005). Histoire du peuple serbe [History of the Serbian People] (in French). Lausanne: L’Age d’Homme.
- Ćirković, Sima (2004). The Serbs. Malden: Blackwell Publishing.
- Fine, John Van Antwerp Jr. (1994) [1987]. The Late Medieval Balkans: A Critical Survey from the Late Twelfth Century to the Ottoman Conquest. Ann Arbor, Michigan: University of Michigan Press. ISBN 0472082604.
- Fotić, Aleksandar (2005). "Belgrade: a Muslim and non-Muslim cultural centre (Sixteenth-Seventeenth centuries)". Provincial Elites in the Ottoman Empire: Helcyon Days in Crete V. Rethymno: Crete University Press. pp. 51–75.
- Popović, Marko (2018). "Siege of Belgrade in 1521 and restoration of fortifications after conquest". Belgrade: 1521-1867. Belgrade: The Institute of History. pp. 5–25.
- Cseh, Valentin: Nándorfehérvár 1521. évi ostroma és elvesztése - Opsada is pad Beograda 1521. godine, HM Zrínyi Nonprofit Kft. - Zrínyi Kiadó, Budapest, 2022.
