= Piri Mehmed Pasha =

Grand Vizier of the Ottoman Empire from 1518 to 1523

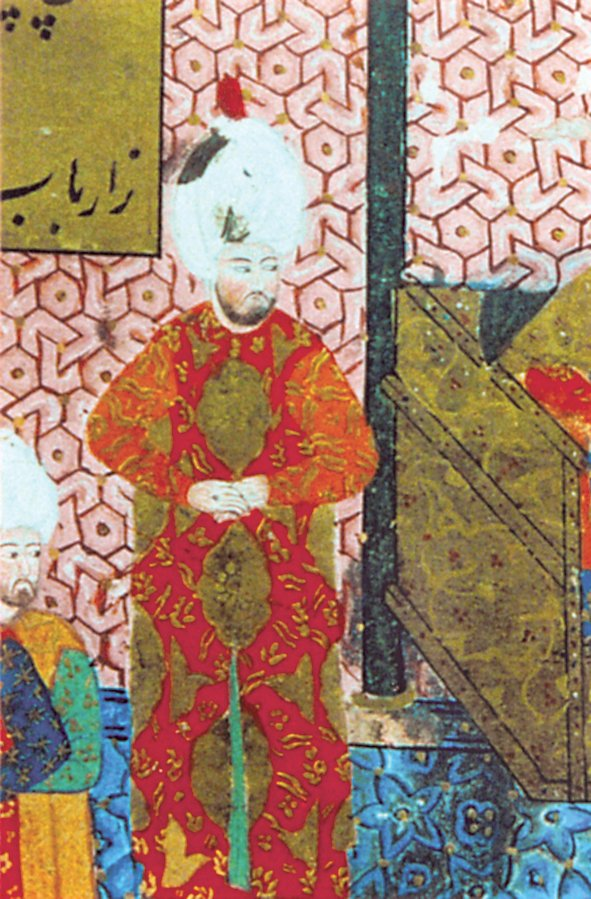
- A miniature depicting Piri Mehmed Pasha in the Süleymannâme, c. 1558

27th Grand Vizier of the Ottoman Empire
- In office 25 January 1518 – 27 June 1523
- Monarchs: Selim I Suleiman I
- Preceded by: Yunus Pasha
- Succeeded by: Pargalı Ibrahim Pasha

Personal details
- Born: c. 1463 Konya, Ottoman Empire
- Died: 1532 (aged 66–67) Silivri, Ottoman Empire

Piri Mehmed Pasha (c. 1463– 1532 Silivri) was an Ottoman statesman, and grand vizier of the Ottoman Empire from 1518 to 1523. He was of Turkish origin.

== Biography ==
=== Early life ===
Piri Mehmed Pasha was born in Konya, probably around 1463. He was a grandchild of Cemaleddin Manastirli, one of the professors of Zinciriye Medrese in Manastir. He was born to Sheikh Cemâl-i Halvetî, also known as the Çelebi Khalifa. His father was the sheikh of Halvetiyye in Amasya and the founder of the Cemâliyya branch of the sect. Matrilineally, he descended from Mevlana Hamazatuddin, buried in Larende (Karaman). Piri was educated in the madrasa of Amasya. He completed his studies in Constantinople. In 1491 he was employed as a clerk at the Amasya Court. He was then promoted chief clerk due to his superior abilities. Upon Bayezid II's accession to the throne, he entered the state service and served as a judge in Sofia, Silivri, Galata, and, in 1499, Seres. Then he became the trustee of Istanbul Fatih Sultan Mehmed Imareti. In 1508, he became the Anatolian treasurer during the Beyazıt period.

Piri Mehmed Çelebi participated in the Çaldıran campaign as the chief treasurer. He made a name for himself fulfilling the food and range works. He won the appreciation of Sultan Selim with his words about attacking immediately without waiting in a war council. After the victory against Shah Ismail, he was tasked with the capture and protection of Tabriz. He was tasked with seizing Shah Ismail's treasury and property in the city. On October 15, 1514, he was appointed vizier. The post was vacated as a result of Mustafa Pasha's dismissal. His house was looted during the Janissary revolt in Amasya.

Piri was dismissed from the viziership, however, he was reinstated on 22 August 1515. A few months later, however, he was dismissed again, along with the grand vizier. He was briefly imprisoned, but released the same day by the new grand vizier. He was thereupon appointed as the Istanbul guard and governor of the sedaret after Yavuz Sultan Selim's departure to Egypt with the Ottoman army in 1516. As guard of Istanbul, he solved the problems relating to the salary of the army in Egypt. Soon, he was also appointed Arab and Persian kazasker.

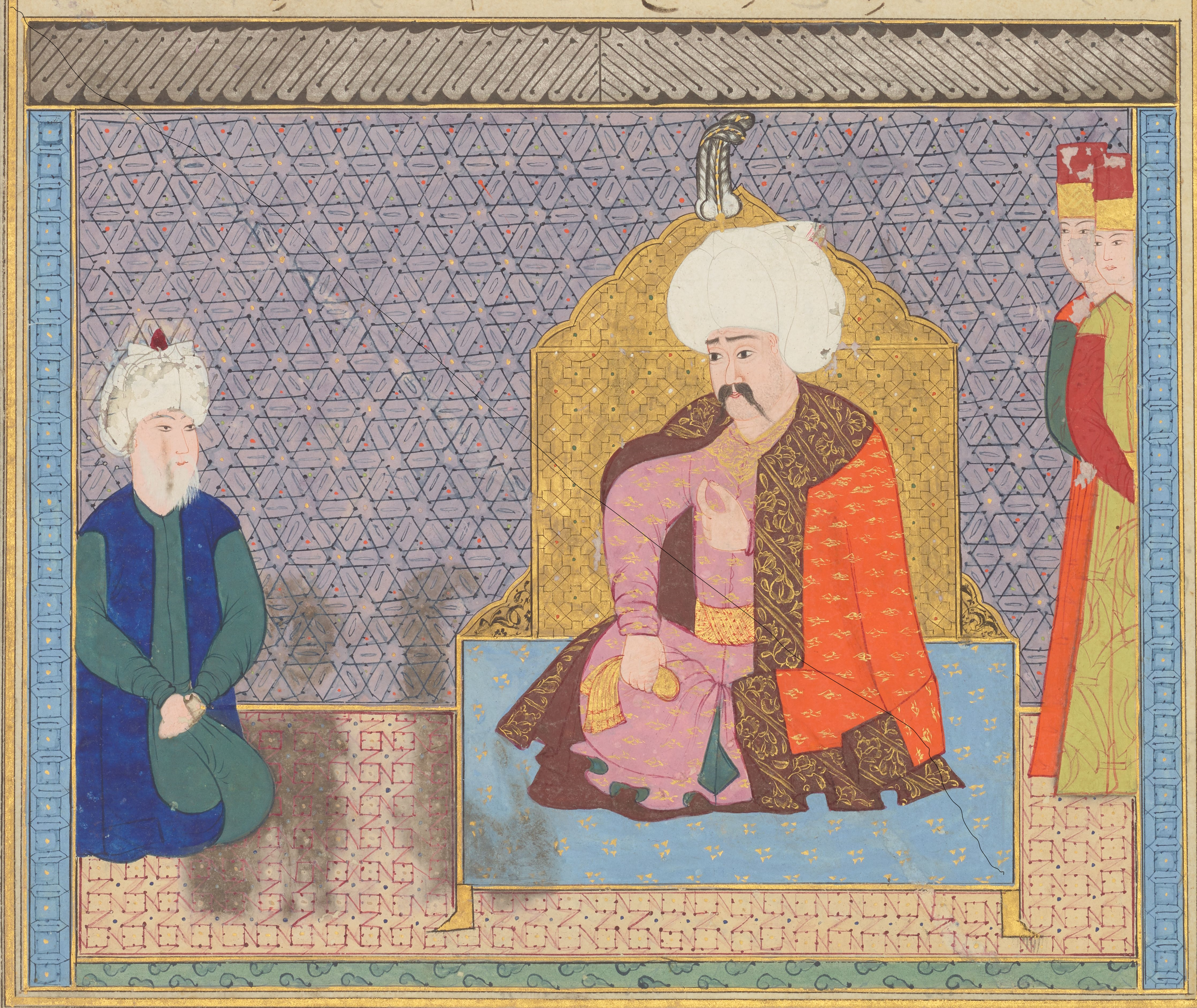
A miniature of Ottoman Sultan Selim I (right) and Piri Mehmed Pasha

After the conquest of Egypt, Yavuz Sultan Selim requested a navy fleet to bring food and ammunition from Istanbul to the Ottoman army in Egypt and to transport the booty from Egypt to Istanbul. Piri Mehmed Pasha, who was the guard of Istanbul, equipped the fleet to be sent to Alexandria with great care. Even more ships than the number requested by the sultan were prepared in Galata and Gallipoli. They were arranged as six cannon and five horse ships. But due to the severe winter at the beginning of 1517, this fleet left Istanbul only on March 26, 1517. Treasures and booty were loaded onto ships arriving in Alexandria, and this fleet arrived in Istanbul on July 15, 1517. All these works and efforts of Piri Mehmed Pasha were preparing him for the position of grand vizier in the eyes of Yavuz Sultan Selim.

Upon his return from the Egypt Campaign, Yavuz Sultan Selim had Yunus Pasha, who was the grand vizier, executed on September 13, 1517, with a sudden decision. Meanwhile, Piri Mehmed Pasha, who was in Istanbul, was urgently summoned to Syria. Piri Mehmed Pasha reached the camp in Damascus on January 24, 1518, and was appointed to the position of grand vizier the next day.

=== Grand Vizier ===
Upon the execution of the grand vizier Yunus Pasha on his return from Egypt, Piri was brought from Istanbul to meet the sultan in Damascus and appointed as the grand vizier (January 1518). He kept his duty as grand vizier until the death of Yavuz Sultan Selim, and also served as grand vizier to Suleiman the Magnificent for nearly three years.

While he was returning to the capital, Selim left Piri and a few soldiers in Diyarbekir region. While there, Piri tried to suppress the Iranian influence in the southern Anatolian area. He conquered regions in Northern Iraq, and made a tahrir of the regions he conquered.

With his personality and courage, he was favored by Yavuz Sultan Selim. In the siege of Belgrade, he gave an important contribution in the capture of the castle in August 1521. He constantly persuaded the new sultan that Belgrade should be conquered, and he advocated the view that its conquest should be given priority. Ahmed Pasha (Hain, "Traitor"), his rival who would later have a role in Piri's dismissal, suggested taking first Šabac, then cross the Sava and strike Buda. Piri, on the other hand, argued that if they didn't capture Belgrade before attacking the Hungarian capital Buda, the Hungarians could cut them off in their return to Belgrade. The sultan preferred Ahmed's plan, but at the same time permitted Piri to besiege Belgrade. It was only thanks to his desperate attempt to convince the sultan to attack the closest valuable target that the Ottomans attacked Belgrade. He was given about 1000 janissaries, soon joined by a contingent from Anatolia. The sultan conquered Šabac while Piri conquered the Zemun Fortress and laid siege on Belgrade. The sultan then ordered Piri to lift the siege in Belgrade and join the bulk of the army as he started to build a bridge to cross the Sava. However: Piri, who had taken Zemun and was besieging Belgrade with a smaller portion of the army, refused to lift the siege in Belgrade. Mustafa Ali complained that the sultan failed to congratulate Piri for Zemun, and sees Ahmed behind this decision; however, it is more likely that the sultan actually needed all forces for the attack on Buda. Next, the attempt to cross the Sava was unsuccessful. The Sava flooded, so much as to make it impossible to cross the bridge to the other side. Fortunately, Piri had not given up on Belgrade, and the sultan informed him that they would soon join him. Together, they captured the city, which was definitely taken on 24 August. Whereas in Šabac the Turks slaughtered all the defenders, in Belgrade about 70 out of 700 defenders survived. Suleiman spared their lives. However, most of the Serbian inhabitants were deported to Constantinople.

The next year, Piri insisted that Rhodes must be taken in the council convened about the conquest of Rhodes. Piri, Çoban and Kurtoğlu participated in the divan meetings, and Piri urged the sultan to hurry to Rhodes. He then joined the siege of the city with the sultan in the Rhodes campaign. He played an important role in the capture of Rhodes, but Ahmed Pasha put pressure on the sultan, and upon his return from the expedition an investigation started against him for allegedly receiving bribery. He was found guilty by the Rumelian and Anatolian kazaskers, and it is said that Ahmed Pasha had to do with the verdict as well. One of the kazaskers, Fenarizade Muhyiddin Çelebi, is said to have supported Ahmed Pasha.

=== Dismissal ===
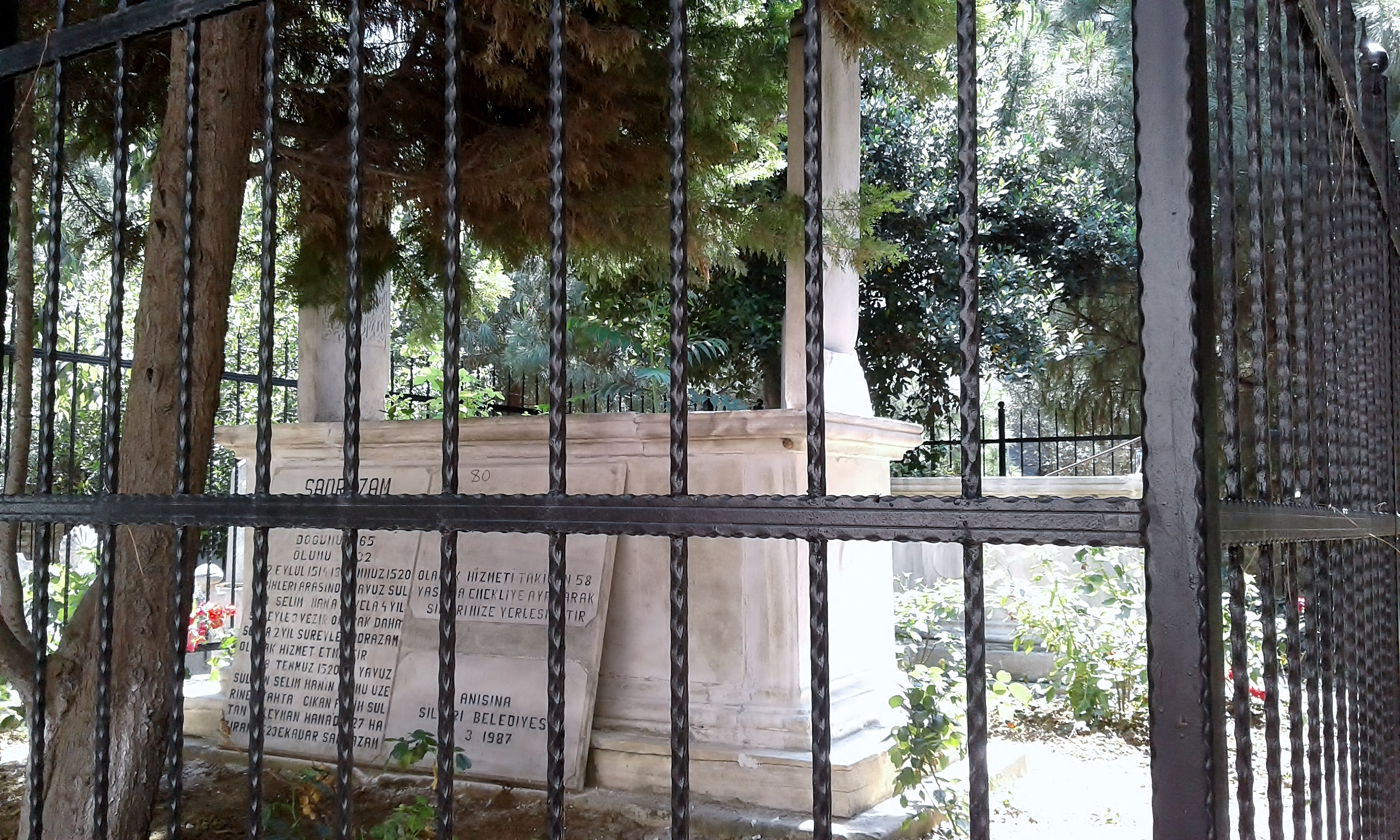
Sarcophagus of Piri Mehmed Pasha in the graveyard of the mosque named after him in Silivri, Istanbul Province.

In order to become grand vizier, the Second Vizier Ahmet Pasha tried to persuade Suleiman to dismiss him, using the old age of Piri Mehmed Pasha as an excuse, and ultimately succeeded.

While the Sultan Suleiman the Magnificent was supposed to bring the second vizier, Ahmed Pasha, to the grand viziership, he appointed Pargalı İbrahim Pasha as the grand vizier. After arriving in Egypt as the beylerbeyi, Ahmet Pasha rebelled by gathering the Mameluke statesmen around him. He delivered a sermon declaring his independence and started printing money to establish a new state. However, two emirs attempted to kill him in his own bath, and shortly after he was captured and killed by Ottoman authorities. Ibrahim Pasha traveled south to Egypt in 1525 and reformed the Egyptian provincial civil and military administration system. He promulgated an edict, the Kanunname, outlining his system. Ibrahim Pasha then returned to Istanbul after a major administrative and financial reforms in the Egyptian province.

=== Death ===
It is rumored that Piri Mehmed Pasha, who retreated to his farm in Silivri after retiring from the Grand Viziership, visited the palace very often and even had a good relationship with Suleiman. From this point of view, it is rumored that Pargalı İbrahim Pasha feared that his grand viziership would be taken back, and in 1532 he made an agreement with Mehmed Pasha's son, Mehmed Efendi, who poisoned his father. He was buried in the tomb next to the mosque he had built in Silivri.

== Legacy ==
=== Reputation ===
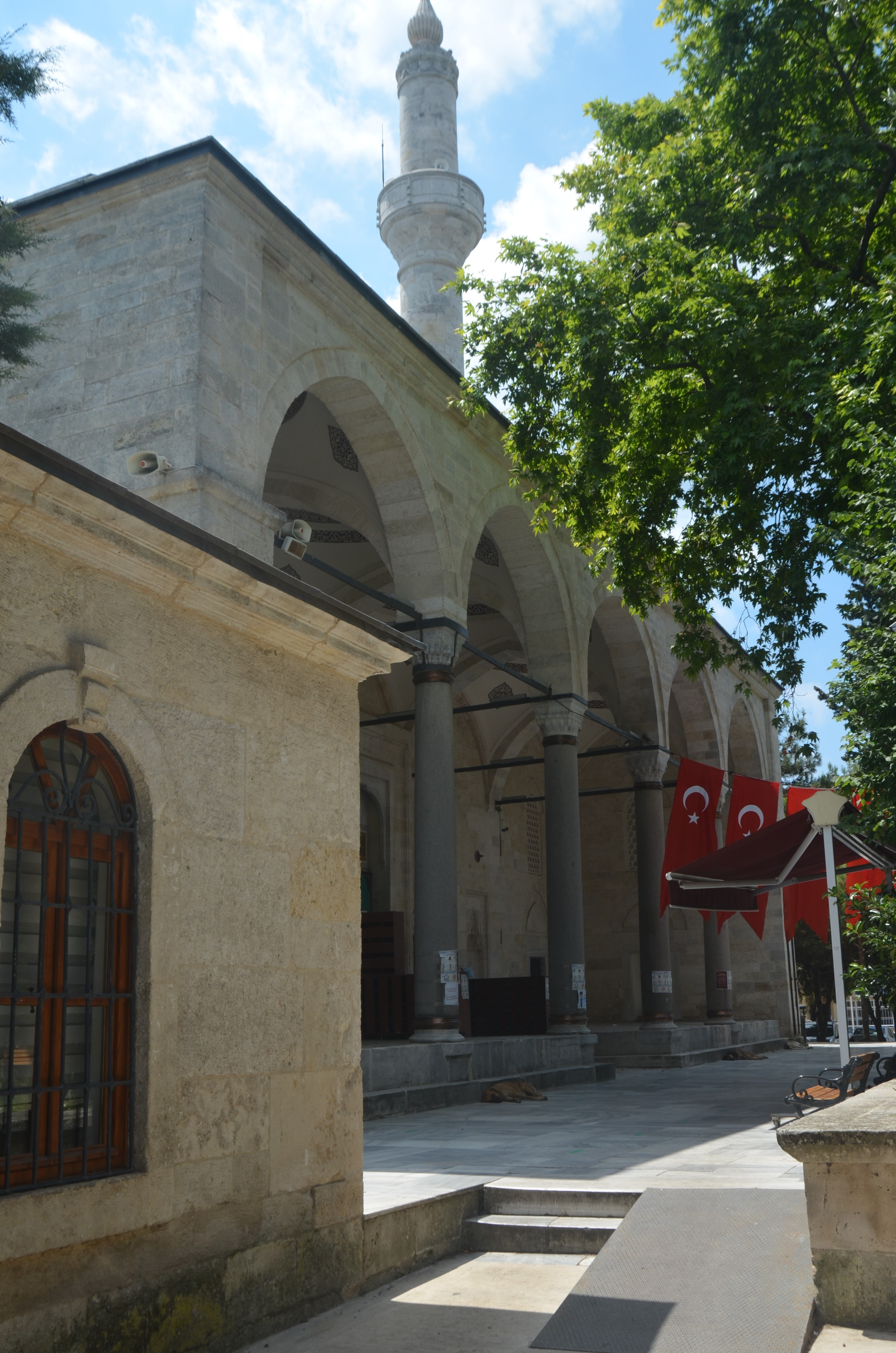
Piri Mehmed Pasha Mosque in Silivri, Istanbul

Piri Mehmed Pasha is generally described as a good statesman. The fact that he was appointed grand vizier and served as such for a long time is witness to his abilities. He was educated in the ilmiye, and yet displayed military skills, playing an important role in the Ottoman successes of the day. Further, he developed the navy, also building a shipyard of large dimensions. As a person interested in Sufism, he helped the Sufists, especially in their struggle against the Safavid order. He was especially fond of Mevlevi and Halvetîs. Because he was a poet and a scholar, he helped in the development of those fields, protecting scholars and poets. Among those who benefited from his protection are: Tâcîzâde Cafer Çelebi, Celâlzâde Mustafa Çelebi and Sucudî Çelebi from Tetovo.

=== Works ===
Piri Mehmed Pasha had many charitable works built. There is a district bearing his name between Halıcıoğlu and Hasköy on the Golden Horn in Istanbul. There are a masjid and a bath built by him in this district. Also in Istanbul are Halveti Tekke, Soğukkuyu Mosque and Madrasa in Zeyrek, Terlikçiler Masjid in Mercan, Halvetî Zaviye, known as Körüklü Lodge, around Molla Gürânî Mosque, and a sibyan school in Camcı Ali district.

In Silivri, where he retired and died, he has a complex consisting of a mosque, soup kitchen (Imaret), school and madrasah, and his tomb is located here. There are also charitable works in many parts of the former Ottoman Empire. Among them a soup kitchen in Belgrade, a mosque, imaret and lodge in Konya, a school in Aksaray, zawiya and ribat near Gülek Castle, a mosque and its complex in Kosovo (Piri Nazir Mosque). He also financed many land and real estate foundations in Anatolia and Rumelia.

== In popular culture ==
He was portrayed by Ayberk Atilla in the 2003 series Hürrem Sultan and by Arif Erkin Güzelbeyoğlu in the 2011 series Muhteşem Yüzyıl.

== See also ==
- Piri Mehmed Pasha Mosque in Silivri, Istanbul Province

Political offices
Preceded by Yunus Pasha	Grand Vizier of the Ottoman Empire; 25 January 1518 – 27 June 1523	Succeeded by Pargalı Ibrahim Pasha
