= Bocignolo =

Noble family of the Republic of Ragusa

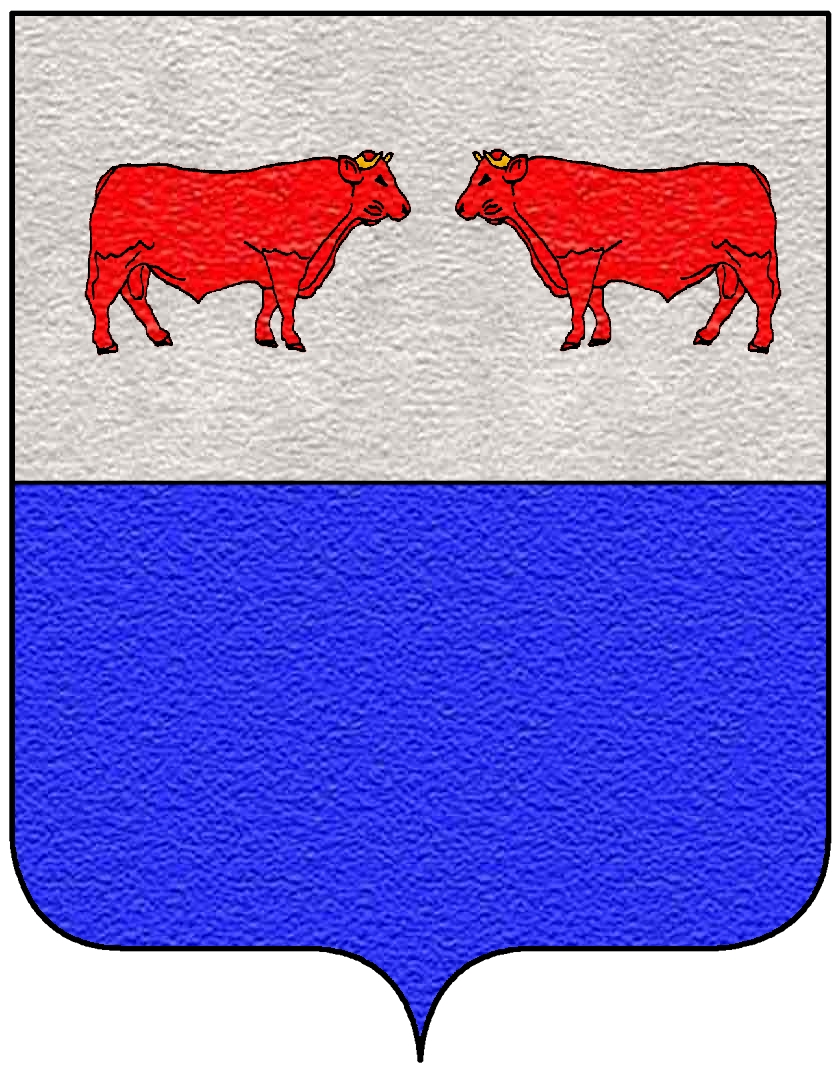
Coat of arms of the Buzignolo.

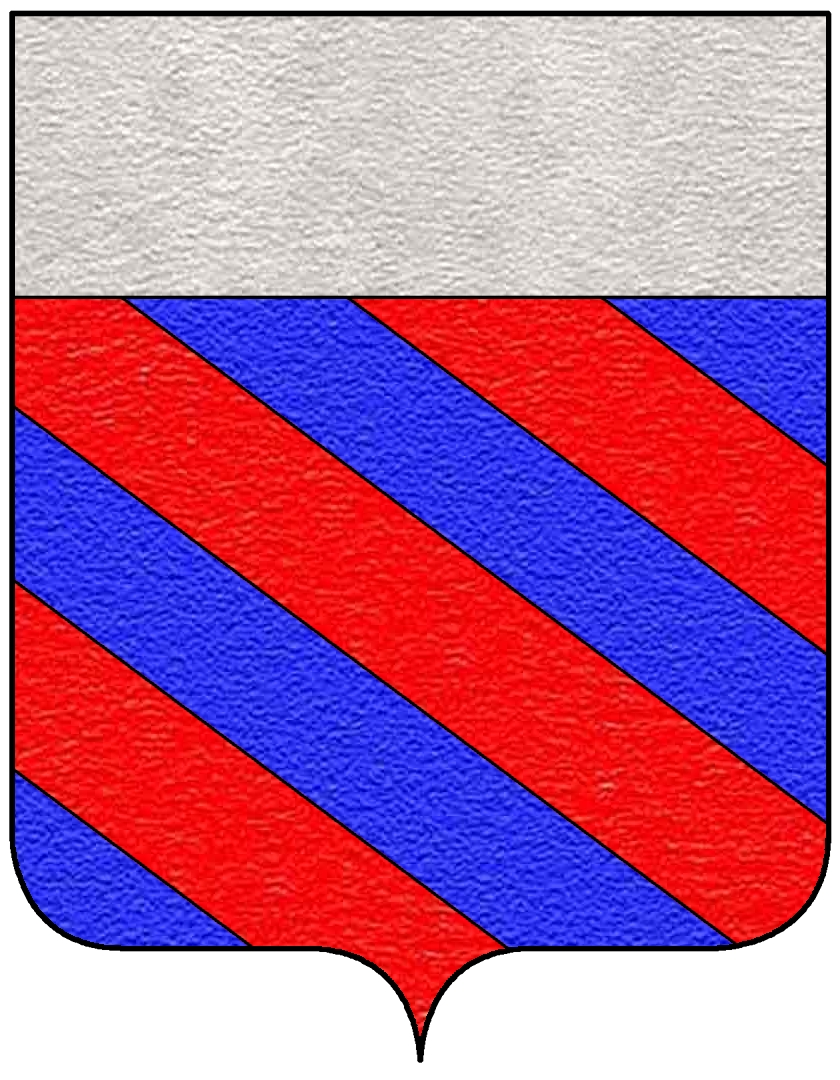
Coat of arms of the Buzignolo.

The House of Bocignolo or Bučinić was a Ragusan noble family.

== History ==
It hailed from Chlieuno (Livno), a town in Hum. In the 15th century they were one of the eleven smallest Ragusan houses. It was mentioned as living in the city of Ragusa (Dubrovnik) in 1588. In 1535 a member was at Vienna in the service of Ferdinand Habsburg, the future emperor.

== Prominent members ==
- Marini de Bocignolo (1319–63).
- Gervasio de Bocignolo (fl. 1313).
- Marino de Bocignolo (fl. 1380).
- Маrinus de Buzignolo (fl. 1395).
- Michael de Buzignolo (fl. 1455), rector.
- Micho de Marinus Bocinolo (fl. 1414–66), politician.
- Marinus de Micho de Marinus Bocinolo (fl. 1477–90), politician.
- Michael Bucignoli (fl. 1524).
- Michael and Paulus Bucignoli (fl. 1537).
- Giovanni Bucignoli (fl. 1547).
- Marco Buzignolo (fl. 1590), ambassador at Constantinople.
- Marinus Petri de Bucignolo
- Marinus Martoli de Bucignolo
- Marinus Martcholi de Bucignoli.
- Hierolamo di Marin di Bucignolo
- Damianus Geruasii de Bocignolo
- Damianus de Bozignolo

== Annotations ==
1. Also spelt Bucignola, Buzignola, Bocignolo, Bocinolo, and Bozignolo. The name has been Slavicized into Bocinich and Bučinčić.

== Sources ==
- Dotto, Diego (2008). Scriptae venezianeggianti a Ragusa nel XIV secolo: edizione e commento di testi volgari dell'Archivio di Stato di Dubrovnik. Viella. p. 86. ISBN 978-88-8334-337-7.
- Rheubottom, David (2000). Age, Marriage, and Politics in Fifteenth-century Ragusa. Oxford University Press. pp. 102–. ISBN 978-0-19-823412-8.
