= 1st Cuirassier Regiment (France) =

- 1er Régiment de Cuirassiers
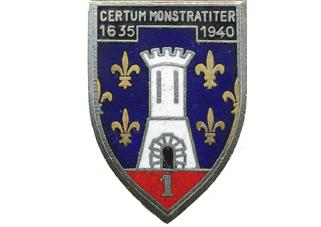
- Unit insgina
- Active: 1635-1815; 1816-1920; 1939-1940; 1943-1999
- Country: France
- Branch: French Army
- Type: Heavy cavalry
- Nickname: Le Régiment de fer (The regiment of iron)
- Mottos: Certum monstrat iter Il montre le droit chemin
- March: Le Regiment de Fer (Eng: The Iron Regiment)
- Engagements: Thirty Years' War; War of the Spanish Succession; French Revolutionary Wars; Napoleonic Wars; World War I World War II

Commanders
- Notable commanders: Henri de la Tour d'Auvergne, Vicomte de Turenne

The 1st Cuirassier Regiment (French: 1er Régiment de Cuirassiers, 1er RC) was the oldest armoured regiment in the French Army, until it was amalgamated with 11th Cuirassiers Regiment. Today its traditions are carried on by the 1st Cuirassier Squadrons Group of the 1st-11th Cuirassier Regiment.

== History ==
=== Origins ===
The regiment was a part of a small army raised by Bernhard of Saxe-Weimar in 1631 to help Gustavus Adolphus against the emperor during the Thirty Years' War. The regiment fought together with the Swedish Army at Breitenfeld, Rain and Lützen. With the death of Gustavus Adolphus and the disaster at Nördlingen the army of Bernhard of Saxe-Weimar entered French service on 26 October 1635. During this time the regiment was commanded by Colonel Trefsky and carried his name: Trefsky-Cavalerie (Trefsky Cavalry).

With Saxe-Weimer's army France began involving itself directly into the war, instead of only subsidizing the Swedes. The Trefsky regiment took part in the victories of Rheinfelden and Breisach, but with Bernard of Saxe-Weimer's death in the summer of 1639, the army loses its leader. Some of the Trefsky Cavalry and other regiments wished to return to Swedish service, but Guébriant, a future Marshal of France, persuaded the army, with the incentive of increased pensions, to remain permanently in French service.

At the time of the Revolution the Trefsky Cavalry was the only regiment was the only French regiment still to be equipped with cuirasses. It had been renamed Colonel-General in 1657. In 1791 it was again renamed as the 1er Régiment de Cavalerie; in 1801 renamed 1er Régiment de Cavalerie-Cuirassiers and in 1803 1er Régiment de Cuirassiers. With the first Bourbon restauration in 1814 the regiment became Cuirassiers du Roi, but it was restored to 1er Régiment de Cuirassiers by Napoleon during the Hundred Days. It was disbanded on 24 December 1815 at Loches after Napoleon's defeat. Re-raised in 1816 it was named Cuirassiers de la Reine (Queen's Cuirassiers).

The regiment was a part of the great cavalry charge in the Battle of Eylau.

=== Regimental war record during the revolution and empire ===
(battles and combats)

- 1792: Jemappes, Anderlecht, and Tienen
- 1793: Maastricht, La Roer, Neerwinden, and Maubeuge
- 1794: Mouscron, Pont-a-Chin, Roeselare, and the Capture of Mechelen
- 1796: Rivoli and Tagliamento
- 1799: Le Trebbia, La Secchia, Novi, and Genola
- 1800: Mozambano
- 1801: San-Massiano and Verone
- 1805: Wertingen, Ulm, Hollabrunn, Raussnitz, and Austerlitz
- 1806: Jena and the Capture of Lubeck
- 1807: Hoff and Eylau
- 1809: Eckmuhl, Ratisbonne, Essling, Wagram, Hollabrunn, and Znaim
- 1812: La Moskowa and Winkowo
- 1813: La Katzbach, Leipzig, Hanau, and the defense of Hamburg
- 1814: La Chausee, Vauchamps, Bar-sur-Aube, Sezanne, and Valcourt
- 1815: Ligny, Genappe, and Waterloo

=== Restoration ===
When Louis XVIII returned to France again after the second abdication of Napoleon I, one of his first acts was to dissolve the entire French Army. The 1st Cuirassier Regiment was disbanded in Loches. According to General Susane its manpower went into the two new created Royal Guard cuirassier regiments and its depot was taken over by the 4th Cuirassier Regiment.

The Count of Béthune formed a new regiment on 27 September 1815. it was named the 1st Cuirassier Regiment or The Queen's Cuirassiers (French: Cuirassiers de la Reine). The regiment was organized with four squadrons and received its new standard on 28 August 1816 from the Duchess of Angoulme, in Compiegne.

Between 1816 and 1828, the regiment was successively garrisoned in Dijon (1819), Toul (1823), Sedan (1824), Nancy (1825), Joigny (1826), Vendôme (1827) and Tours (1828). When the 1830 revolution against the Bourbon monarchy broke out, the regiment was sent to Angers to ensure the maintenance of law and order, but did not have to actively intervene.

=== July Monarchy ===
The end of Bourbon rule in France also meant changes for the French Army. The regiment received a new commander: Colonel Count Ordener, on 5 August 1830. Several officers, who had been retired on half-pay since 1815 because of their Napoleonic sympathies, were able to return to the regiment. The regiment also lost the name: "Cuirassiers de la Reine" becoming simply the 1st Cuirassier Regiment.

Between 1830 and 1848, the regiment was garrisoned in various cities: Vendôme, Meaux (1830), Versailles (1831) and then Lille. The 1st Cuirassiers left the latter garrison to take part in the short campaign in Belgium in support of Belgian independence. When the regiment returned to France it was garrisoned in Compiegne (1832), Nancy (1833–1836), Paris (1837), Haguenau (1838–1842) and finally in Vesoul from 1843 to 1848.

During the French Revolution of 1848, the regiment was sent first to Mantes, then to Paris, to ensure law and order.

=== Second Empire ===
During the Second Empire, the French army’s cuirassier regiments went through a period of relative inactivity. As heavy cavalry with slow movements, they were not well suited for overseas warfare in Algeria, Mexico, and China. Consequently, the 1st Cuirassier Regiment remained in peacetime garrisons for most of this period, intended to be used as shock troops in a future European war.

=== Second Italian War of Independence ===
However, during the Italian campaign of 1859 against Austria, the 1st Cuirassier Regiment was sent with the French army of Napoleon III. During the Battle of Solferino, the cuirassiers took part as shock troops during the decisive moments of the engagement. The French attack began to stall due to strong Austrian resistance in the defensive positions of the locality, and Napoleon III, observing the situation and with few alternatives to break the enemy’s defenses, employed the Imperial Guard and the cuirassiers to reinforce the advance.

These troops were sent to carry out a massive charge alongside the Imperial infantry, which was advancing through the other sectors of Solferino. The combined attack broke the Austrian resistance, forcing their troops to abandon their positions and securing the capture of Solferino.

After securing Solferino, the cuirassiers advanced rapidly to protect the French sector. The Austrians, witnessing this, attempted to take advantage of the situation by launching a cavalry attack to break the French positions. The 1st Cuirassier Regiment, which had only just arrived in that sector and was rapidly taking up positions, resisted alongside the Imperial Guard cavalry. Although they did everything possible to hold their position, the situation became increasingly difficult due to their numerical inferiority against the Austrian forces. However, they managed to hold out long enough until the arrival of the Imperial Guard artillery, whose intervention stopped the enemy advance, causing heavy losses to the Austrian cavalry and forcing it to withdraw.

Meanwhile, the Austrians observed that the Sardinian forces were advancing on the other sector of the battlefield and that their attempted attack had failed. Faced with an increasingly unfavorable situation, Emperor Franz Joseph I ordered the withdrawal of his army. This retreat gave victory to the Franco-Sardinian forces and made the Battle of Solferino one of the decisive engagements of the war against Austria.

The Battle of Solferino highlighted the importance of the 1st Cuirassier Regiment as shock troops. Their intervention contributed to the capture of the locality and, afterwards, they resisted very well against Austrian forces superior in number, gaining valuable time for the French army and achieving victory in the battle and in the war against Austria.

=== Franco-Prussian War ===
Its next major participation in combat came in 1870 during the Franco-Prussian War. The 1st Cuirassier Regiment, belonging to the 2nd Cavalry Reserve Division, took part in an important, though costly, charge during the Battle of Frœschwiller on 6 August 1870. During the engagement, the cuirassiers were ordered to charge the Prussian forces, first attacking and capturing several enemy artillery batteries before disrupting the Prussian lines and later engaging their counterparts, the Prussian cuirassiers, whom they managed to defeat in combat. The charge provided valuable time that helped save a significant portion of the French army during the retreat. Although the charge caused casualties among the cuirassiers, it achieved its main objective by preventing the destruction of a large part of the French army and inflicting serious damage on the enemy.

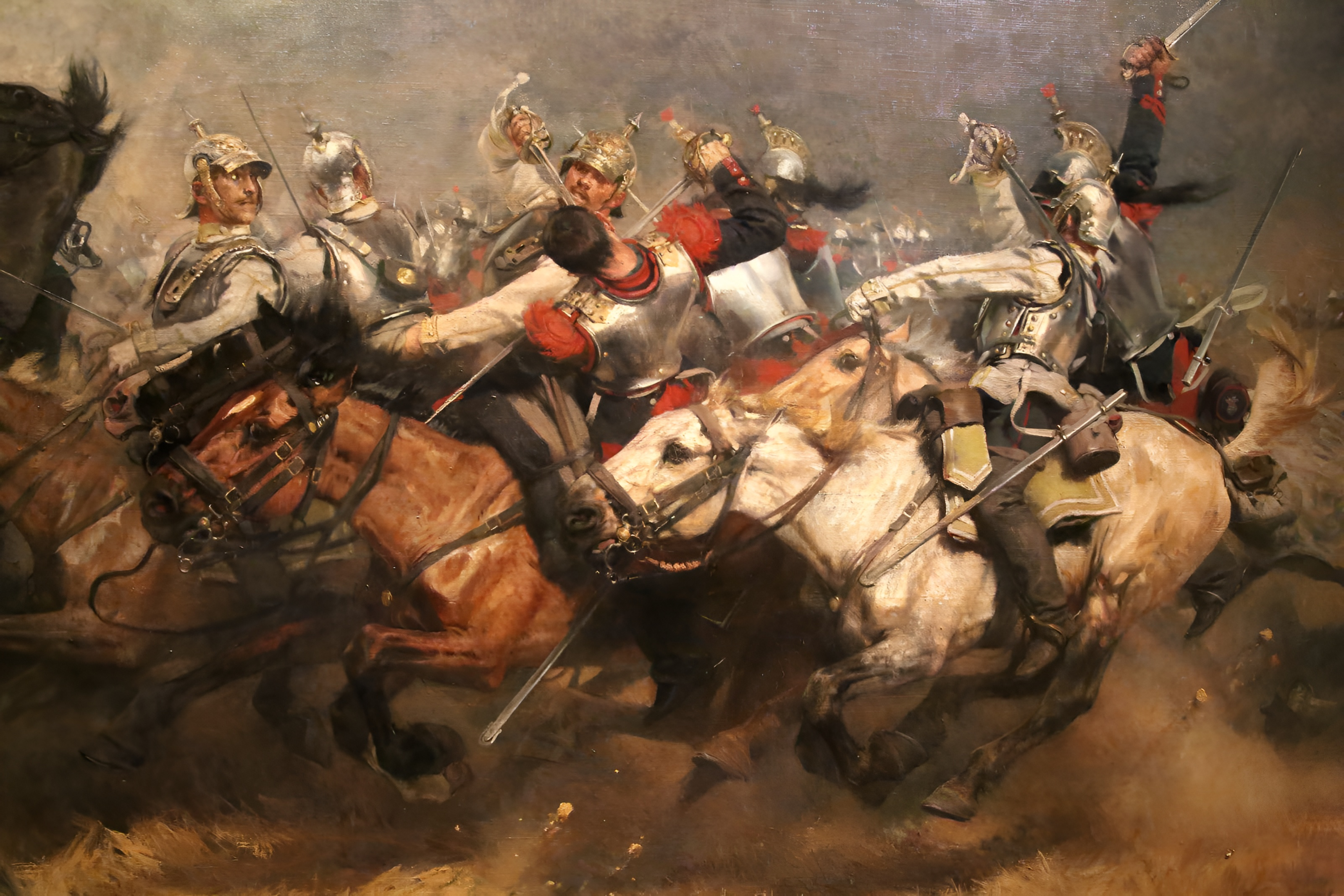
The charge of the French cuirassiers against the Prussian cuirassiers at the Battle of Frœschwiller

After the Battle of Frœschwiller, the regiment continued to take part in the Franco-Prussian War, distinguishing itself throughout the campaign until reaching the Battle of Sedan on 1 September 1870. During this engagement, the French cuirassiers launched several charges against the Prussian positions in a desperate attempt to break the encirclement and relieve pressure on the French army. Advancing under intense enemy fire, they managed to penetrate some enemy positions, inflicting considerable casualties on the Prussian forces and even temporarily capturing several artillery pieces.

During their attacks, the cuirassiers advanced beyond the Prussian defensive lines and charged against enemy infantry units, surprising the Prussians by continuing their advance farther than expected and maintaining the momentum of their attacks. With little to no support from French infantry or artillery, they continued their advance with remarkable courage, fighting almost alone, inflicting numerous casualties and causing disorder among the Prussian forces before eventually being forced to withdraw. Despite this, their action was highly valuable, as it provided a much-needed respite for the French army, temporarily reducing Prussian pressure and allowing several units to reorganize, recover their positions, and continue fighting during the engagement.

Although their charges could not change the final outcome of Sedan, they demonstrated that French heavy cavalry could still inflict significant losses and disrupt enemy formations through determined attacks. Their bravery and sacrifice earned them the respect of even their opponents and, according to a historical tradition, King William I of Prussia admired their actions and reportedly exclaimed: “What brave men!”

=== Between the World Wars ===
The twelve French cuirassiers that had existed in 1914 were reduced to six in 1919. As a regiment which had remained horse mounted throughout the war, the 1st Cuirassiers had had little opportunity to distinguish itself on active service after the opening stages of the conflict. It was accordingly amongst the cuirassier regiments disbanded. The regiment was however recreated as a mechanised unit in 1940.

== Honours ==
=== Battle honours ===
Flag of the regiment

- Jemmapes 1792
- Austerlitz 1805
- Eylau 1807
- La Moskowa 1812
- L'Avre 1918
- La Marne 1918
- Colmar 1945
- Stuttgart 1945
- AFN 1952–1962

=== Decorations ===
- Croix de guerre 1914-1918 with one palm and one star.
- Croix de guerre 1939-1945 with three palms.
