= Roquefort-la-Bédoule =

Commune in Provence-Alpes-Côte d'Azur, France

Roquefort-la-Bédoule Ròcafòrt e la Bedola (Occitan)
- Commune
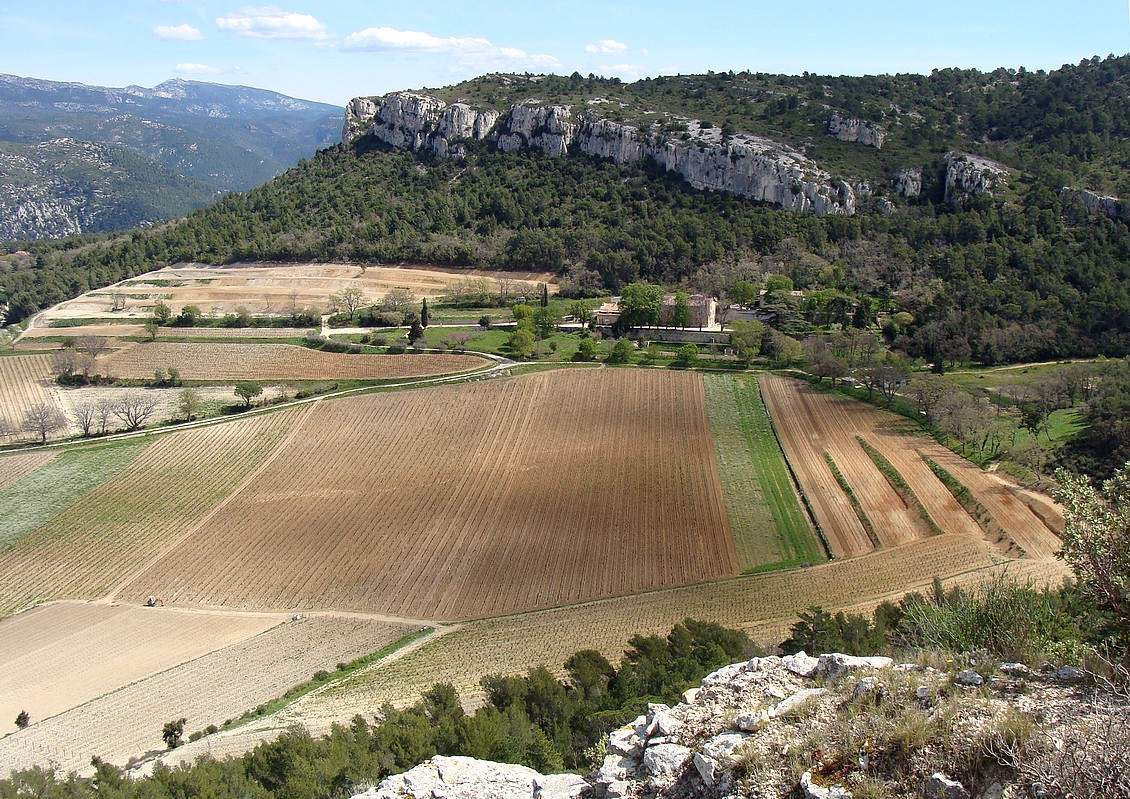
- A view of the Château de Roquefort and its surroundings

- Coat of arms
- Location of Roquefort-la-Bédoule
- Location within France Location within Provence-Alpes-Côte d'Azur
- Coordinates: 43°14′54″N 5°35′29″E
- Country: France
- Region: Provence-Alpes-Côte d'Azur
- Department: Bouches-du-Rhône
- Arrondissement: Marseille
- Canton: La Ciotat
- Intercommunality: Aix-Marseille-Provence

Government
  - Mayor (2026–32): Marc Del Grazia
- Area^{1}: 31.15 km^{2} (12.03 sq mi)
- Elevation: 276 m (906 ft)
- Highest elevation: 567 m (1,860 ft)
- Lowest elevation: 158 m (518 ft)
- Population (2023): 5,798
  - Density: 186.1/km^{2} (482.1/sq mi)
- Time zone: UTC+01:00 (CET)
  - Summer (DST): UTC+02:00 (CEST)
- INSEE/Postal code: 13085 /13830
- Dialling codes: 0491
- ^{1} French Land Register data, which excludes lakes, ponds, glaciers > 1 km^{2} (0.386 sq mi or 247 acres) and river estuaries.

Roquefort-la-Bédoule (French pronunciation: [ʁɔkfɔʁ la bedul]; Occitan: Ròcafòrt e la Bedola) is a commune in the Bouches-du-Rhône department in the Provence-Alpes-Côte d'Azur region in Southern France. Its inhabitants are called Bédoulens (masculine) and Bédoulennes (feminine).

== Geography ==
Roquefort-la-Bédoule is situated north of Cassis, Ceyreste and La Cadière-d'Azur, Var; south of Aubagne, Gémenos and Cuges-les-Pins; east of Carnoux-en-Provence; and west of Le Castellet, Var.

== History ==
The town of Roquefort-la-Bédoule was founded in the 7th century. In 1966, the new commune of Carnoux-en-Provence was established on former Roquefort-la-Bédoule territory.

== Demographics ==
Historical population

Year	Pop.	±% p.a.
1793	430	—
1800	359	−2.55%
1806	419	+2.61%
1821	448	+0.45%
1831	395	−1.25%
1836	394	−0.05%
1841	400	+0.30%
1846	429	+1.41%
1851	459	+1.36%
1856	492	+1.40%
1861	535	+1.69%
1866	546	+0.41%
1872	600	+1.58%
1876	648	+1.94%
1881	787	+3.96%
1886	888	+2.44%
1891	1,075	+3.90%
1896	1,333	+4.40%
1901	1,904	+7.39%

Year	Pop.	±% p.a.
1906	2,167	+2.62%
1911	2,002	−1.57%
1921	1,814	−0.98%
1926	1,859	+0.49%
1931	1,848	−0.12%
1936	1,515	−3.90%
1946	1,120	−2.98%
1954	1,231	+1.19%
1962	1,635	+3.61%
1968	1,770	+1.33%
1975	2,384	+4.35%
1982	3,355	+5.00%
1990	4,162	+2.73%
1999	4,733	+1.44%
2007	5,085	+0.90%
2012	5,148	+0.25%
2017	5,688	+2.02%
2023	5,798	+0.32%

Source: EHESS and INSEE (1968–2023)

== See also ==
- Communes of the Bouches-du-Rhône department
