= Battle of Khotyn =

Battle of Khotyn can refer to several battles that took place near Khotyn:

- Battle of Khotyn (1509)
- Battle of Khotyn (1530)
- Battle of Khotyn (1621)
- Battle of Khotyn (1673)
- Siege of Khotyn (1788)
