= Battle of Neerwinden =

Battle of Neerwinden may refer to:

- Battle of Neerwinden (1693), a battle between the French, British, and Dutch
- Battle of Neerwinden (1793), a battle between the French and Austrians
