= Karl Mack von Leiberich =

Austrian field marshal (1752–1828)

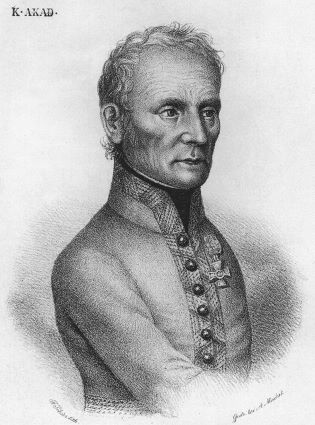
- Karl Mack von Leiberich
- Born: 25 August 1752; Nennslingen, Principality of Ansbach
- Died: 22 December 1828 (aged 76); St. Pölten, Lower Austria
- Military career
- Allegiance: Holy Roman Empire; Austrian Empire
- Service years: 1770–1807
- Rank: Feldmarschall-leutnant
- Conflicts: War of the Bavarian Succession; Austro-Turkish War; Siege of Belgrade (1789); War of the First Coalition; Battle of Aldenhoven (1793); Battle of Neerwinden; War of the Second Coalition; Battle of Civita Castellana [it]; Battle of Otricoli [it]; War of the Third Coalition; Ulm Campaign; Battle of Günzburg; Battle of Haslach-Jungingen; Battle of Ulm (POW)
- Awards: Military Order of Maria Theresa

Karl Freiherr Mack von Leiberich (25 August 1752 – 22 December 1828) was an Austrian officer. He is best remembered as the commander of the Austrian forces that capitulated to Napoleon's Grande Armée in the Battle of Ulm in 1805.

== Early career ==
Karl Mack was born at Nennslingen, in the Principality of Ansbach. In 1770 he joined an Austrian cavalry regiment, in which his uncle, Georg Wilhelm Leiberich, was a squadron commander, becoming an officer seven years later. During the brief War of the Bavarian Succession he was selected for service on the staff of Count Kinsky, under whom, and subsequently under the commander-in-chief Field Marshal Count Lacy, he did excellent work. He was promoted first lieutenant in 1778, and captain on the quartermaster-general's staff in 1783. Count Lacy, then the foremost soldier of the Austrian army, had the highest opinion of his young assistant. In 1785 Mack married Katherine Gabrieul, and was ennobled under the name of Mack von Leiberich.

In the Turkish War he was employed on the headquarters staff, becoming in 1788 major and personal aide-de-camp to the emperor, Joseph II and in 1789 was promoted to lieutenant colonel. He distinguished himself in the storming of Belgrade in 1789. Shortly after this, disagreements between Mack and Ernst Gideon von Laudon, now commander-in-chief, led to the former demanding a court-martial; Mack left the front but received a colonelcy (1789) and the Order of Maria Theresa. In 1790 Laudon and Mack, reconciled, were again on the field together. During these campaigns Mack received a severe head injury from which he never fully recovered. In 1793 he was made quartermaster-general (chief of staff) to Prince Josias of Saxe-Coburg, commanding in the Netherlands and he enhanced his reputation by the ensuing campaign. The young Archduke Charles of Austria, who won his own first laurels in the action of March 1, 1793, wrote after the battle, "Above all we have to thank Colonel Mack for these successes".

== French Revolutionary Wars ==
Mack distinguished himself again on the field of Neerwinden and had a leading part in the negotiations between Coburg and Dumouriez. He continued to serve as quartermaster-general and was made titular chief (Inhaber) of a cuirassier regiment. He received a wound at Famars and in 1794 was once more engaged in active service after being made a major-general.

While Mack had been credited with the initial successes of March–April 1793, the ultimate failure of the coalition allies was also ascribed to him even though it was due to political and military factors over which he had no control. He fell into disfavour in military circles with only the Emperor (now Francis II) remaining as his supporter. In 1797, Mack was promoted Feldmarschall-leutnant and the following year he accepted the command of the Neapolitan army at the personal request of the Emperor. The unpromising material of his new command against the French revolutionary troops and being in actual danger of being murdered by his own men prompted Mack to abandon his command and to take refuge in the French camp. Initially, he was promised to be returned to his own country but Napoleon ordered instead that he should be sent to France as a prisoner of war.

=== Napoleon about Mack ===
In early 1800, Napoleon Bonaparte met Mack in Paris and reportedly formed the following impression of him:

Mack is a man of the lowest mediocrity I ever saw in my life; he is full of self-sufficiency and conceit, and believes himself equal to anything. He has no talent. I should like to see him opposed some day to one of our good generals; we should then see fine work. He is a boaster, and that is all. He is really one of the most silly men existing; and, besides all that, he is unlucky.

— Louis A.-F. de Bourrienne (Ramsay W. Phipps, ed.), Memoirs of Napoleon Bonaparte, Scribner, 1905, Vol.I, p.350.

== War of the Third Coalition ==
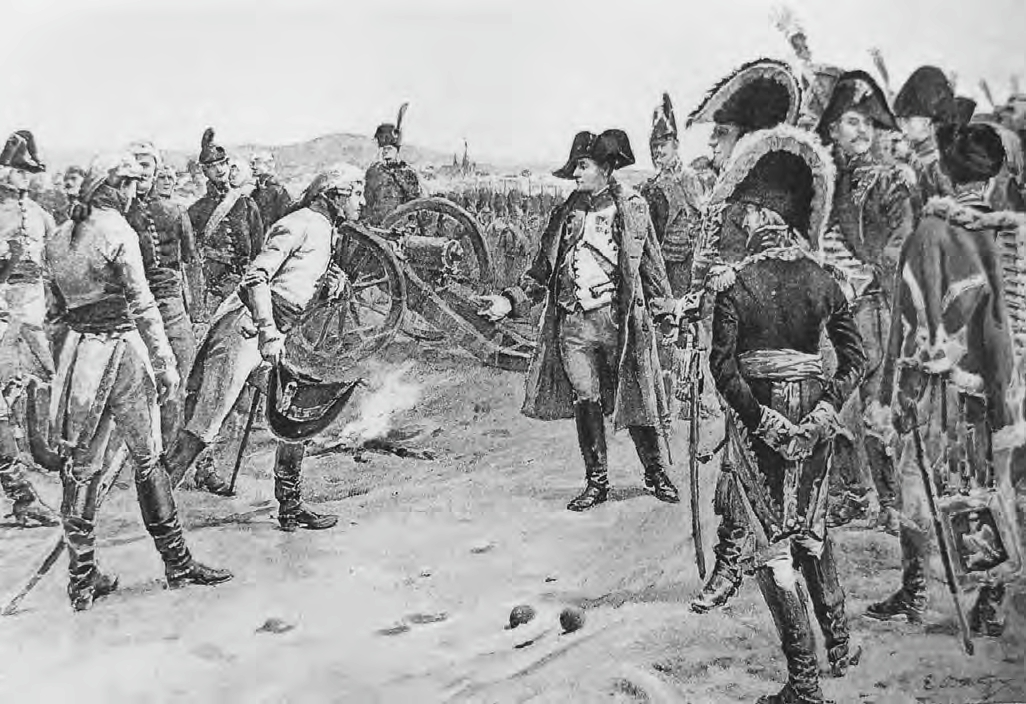
General Mack surrenders his army at Ulm, 20 October 1805.

Two years later he escaped from Paris in disguise. There were allegations that he broke his parole, a severe allegation that reflected on his honor as a gentleman and an officer (in the opinion of the anonymous author of his biography in the 1911 Eleventh edition of Encyclopædia Britannica this allegation was false).

He was not employed for some years, but in 1804, when the war party in the Austrian court needed a general to oppose the peace policy of the Archduke Charles, Mack was made quartermaster-general of the army, with instructions to prepare for a war with France. He did all that was possible within the available time to reform the army, and on the opening of the war of 1805 he became quartermaster-general to the titular commander-in-chief in Germany, the Archduke Ferdinand Karl Joseph of Austria-Este, who was himself inexperienced in military command. Consequently, Mack held the real responsible commander of the army that opposed Napoleon in Bavaria, but his position was ill-defined and his authority treated with minimal respect by the other general officers. Furthermore, the restructuring of the Habsburg military had been incomplete; Mack chose to initiate some of Charles' innovations, while ignoring others. His own insecurities and vagaries did not encourage the confidence of the staff; in the campaigning that led up to the Battle of Ulm, Mack's frequent reversals of Viennese policy, and even his own decisions, further undermined an already fragile command structure.

At Ulm in October 1805, he surrendered the entire army to Napoleon. A few of his officers, including Prince von Schwarzenberg, broke through the French defenses in a massed cavalry charge and escaped, but most of the Austrian high command was captured with 25,000 men, 18 generals, 65 guns, and 40 standards. The general officers received a parole that required them to abstain from combat with France, removing the bulk of Habsburg commanders from the possibility of service in the upcoming campaign of the Upper Danube.

After Austerlitz, Mack was convicted of cowardice by a court-martial. He was deprived of his rank, his regiment, and his honors, chiefly the Order of Maria Theresa, and imprisoned for two years. Upon his release in 1808, he lived in relative obscurity until 1819, when the ultimate victory of the allies had obliterated the memory of earlier disasters, he was, at the request of Prince Schwarzenberg, reinstated in the army as Feldmarschall-leutnant, and a member of the Order of Maria Theresa. He died on 22 October 1828 at S. Pölten. Mack makes a brief appearance as a character in book two of Volume I of Tolstoy's War and Peace.

== Sources ==
- Endnotes:
  - C. A. Schweigerd: Oesterreichs Helden und Heerführer von Maximilian I. bis auf die neueste Zeit in Biographien und Charakterskizzen .... Vienna, 1854
  - Constantin von Wurzbach: Biographisches Lexikon des Kaiserthums Oesterreich. Vienna 1856 - 1891.
  - Johann Ritter von Rittersberg: Biographien der ausgezeichnetesten Feldherren der k.k. oesterreichischen Armee. Prague, 1828
  - The Historisches Taschenbuch (a yearbook founded by Friedrich von Raumer) for 1873 contains a vindication of Mack.
  - A short critical memoir will be found in Streffleur (i.e., Österreichische Militärische Zeitschrift) for January 1907.
