= Battle of Aldenhoven =

Battle of Aldenhoven may refer to:

- Battle of Aldenhoven (1793)
- Battle of Aldenhoven (1794)
