= Siege of Giurgiu (1790) =

1790 battle during the Austro-Turkish War

- Part of Austro-Turkish War (1788–1791)
Date	30 May – 11 June 1790
Location	Giurgiu, Ottoman Empire
Result	Ottoman victory

Belligerents
Habsburg monarchy	Ottoman Empire

Commanders and leaders
(Habsburg monarchy) Prince Coburg (Note: During Coburg's personal reconnaissance (in his absence), the Ottomans made their successful sortie.) (Habsburg monarchy) von Thurn † (Habsburg monarchy) General Ausek †	Çavuşzade Abdullah Pasha; Cengiz Mehmed Giray

Strength
15,000 men	4,000 men

Casualties and losses
800 killed 200 wounded 24 siege batteries lost other estimates: 6,000 killed	Unknown

The siege of Giurgiu was launched by the Austrian army led by Prince Coburg, who besieged the Ottoman city of Giurgiu in 1790. The siege ended in fiasco for the Austrians and was one of the last engagements in the Austro-Turkish War of 1788–1791.

== Background ==
The ongoing war with the Ottomans took a toll on the Austrians; their emperor Joseph had died, and their country was on the verge of war with Prussia, who were allied with the Ottomans, which forced Austria to withdraw parts of their forces against Prussia. The Russian general, Alexander Suvorov, made plans with the Austrian general, Prince Coburg, to launch an offensive against the Ottomans. Their plan was to capture Orșova and Giurgiu and to cross the Danube River.

However, the Russian prince, Grigory Potemkin, disapproved of this plan as he simply disliked Prince Coburg considering him incompetent and selfish. Coburg decided to take matters on his own without the help of Russia. The prince began the siege of Orșova. The city surrendered to the Austrians on April 7. Encouraged by this victory, they marched towards Giurgiu, but slowly.

== Siege ==
The Austrian army consisted of 9 battalions of infantrymen and 16 squadrons of cavalry, making the total force of the Austrians 15,000 men. They arrived in Giurgiu at the end of May. The Ottoman garrison was led by Çavuşzade Abdullah Pasha and Cengiz Mehmed Giray. The Ottomans had a force of only 4,000 men. The Austrians began the siege work at the beginning of June, managed to erect the first siege battery, and began bombing the fort, but with little effect. The Ottomans remained in their castle. The Austrians underestimated the Ottomans, thinking it would be an easy siege. They paid no attention to the fort built on the Russian or French model.

By June 8, a breach battery of four 18-pound cannons and seven mortars was installed 80 steps from the fortress. The Austrians remained in their trenches, not expecting any Ottoman attack; however, on June 10, the Ottomans launched a sortie with only 400 men. The Ottomans used yatagan in their sortie. The Austrians were taken by surprise, as they were not trained for close combat. At this time Coburg and General Splény set out in boats, down and up the Danube, to survey the banks of the river and communicate with the right bank. The Ottomans fell upon the 3 battalions occupying the trenches and forced them to retreat. The two battalions rushed to save the first one; however, the Ottomans routed them as well.

The artillery commander, Thurn, was killed in this battle along with General Ausek. The Ottomans then rushed to the siege batteries, captured 9 mortars, 8 siege guns, and 7 field guns, and took them to the castle. Having lost all of his siege batteries, Coburg was forced to raise the siege on June 11. The Austrians lost 800 men and had 200 wounded. Other estimates put the Austrian losses at 6,000.

== Aftermath ==
The siege of Giurgiu marked the turning point of the war. Potemkin heavily criticized Coburg for this failure, calling him a fool. The defeat forced the Austrian emperor, Leopold, to abandon his predecessor policy of gaining territory from the Ottomans and made him inclined to peace talks. Austrian plans to capture Wallachia ended in failure. The Battle of Giurgiu made a decisive contribution to undermining Austrian imperialism in the Balkans. In July, the Vienna court negotiated to sign a separate agreement with Prussia; the conditions were ceding back their conquests to the Ottomans and nullifying their alliance with Russia; thus, Russia found itself deserted with no allies.

== Sources ==
- Andrei Nikolaevich Petrov, The Second Turkish War during the reign of Empress Catherine II. 1787–1791.
- Alexander Petrushevsky, Generalissimo Prince Suvorov.
- Alexander Mikaberidze, Kutuzov: A Life in War and Peace.
- Ionel-Claudiu Dumitrescu, The Austrian disaster at Giurgiu (June 8, 1790).
