= Carnoux-en-Provence =

Commune in Provence-Alpes-Côte d'Azur, France

Carnoux-en-Provence Carnós de Provença (Occitan)
- Commune
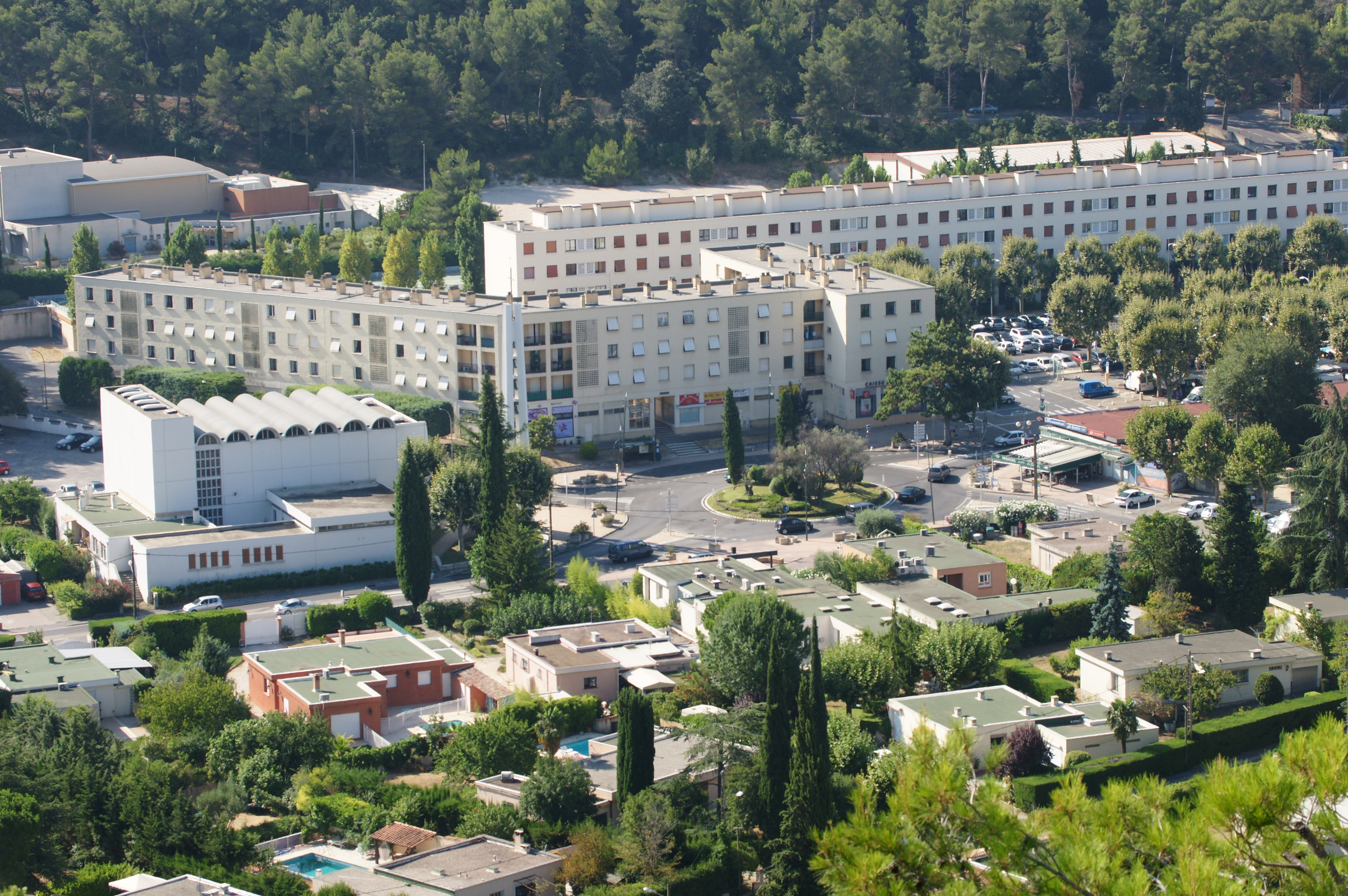
- A view of Carnoux-en-Provence

- Coat of arms
- Location of Carnoux-en-Provence
- Location within France Location within Provence-Alpes-Côte d'Azur
- Coordinates: 43°15′23″N 5°33′52″E
- Country: France
- Region: Provence-Alpes-Côte d'Azur
- Department: Bouches-du-Rhône
- Arrondissement: Marseille
- Canton: La Ciotat
- Intercommunality: Aix-Marseille-Provence

Government
  - Mayor (2026–32): Nicolas Bouland
- Area^{1}: 3.45 km^{2} (1.33 sq mi)
- Highest elevation: 380 m (1,250 ft)
- Lowest elevation: 180 m (590 ft)
- Population (2023): 6,873
  - Density: 1,990/km^{2} (5,160/sq mi)
- Time zone: UTC+01:00 (CET)
  - Summer (DST): UTC+02:00 (CEST)
- INSEE/Postal code: 13119 /13470
- Dialling codes: 0491
- ^{1} French Land Register data, which excludes lakes, ponds, glaciers > 1 km^{2} (0.386 sq mi or 247 acres) and river estuaries.

Carnoux-en-Provence (French pronunciation: [kaʁnu ɑ̃ pʁɔvɑ̃s]; Occitan: Carnós de Provença), commonly referred to simply as Carnoux, is a commune in the Bouches-du-Rhône department in the Provence-Alpes-Côte d'Azur region in Southern France. It was created in 1966 from the commune of Roquefort-la-Bédoule.

Carnoux-de-Provence is located 16.3 km (10.3 mi) to the east-southeast of Marseille. Camp de Carpiagne, the garrison for the 1st Foreign Cavalry Regiment and formerly 1st-11th Cuirassier armoured (tank) regiment of the French Army, is found in the town's western part, as well as with territory in the 9th arrondissement of Marseille, Aubagne and Cassis, north of the renowned road from Marseille to Cassis.

== History ==
In 1957, French citizens repatriated from Morocco established the town of Carnoux on the land of Roquefort-la-Bédoule, where those repatriated from Algeria were also welcomed from 1962.

In 1966, the commune of Carnoux-en-Provence was officially created, becoming the 119th commune in Bouches-du-Rhône. The city's urban and municipal policies were developed by French architect Jean Rozan (1887–1977).

== Population ==
Population development since 1968:

Historical population
Year	Pop.	±% p.a.
1968	2,207	—
1975	3,120	+5.07%
1982	5,149	+7.42%
1990	6,363	+2.68%
1999	7,042	+1.13%
2007	6,886	−0.28%
2012	6,764	−0.36%
2017	6,600	−0.49%
2023	6,873	+0.68%
Source: INSEE

== Geography ==
=== Situation ===
Carnoux-en-Provence is situated to the east of Marseille, with Aubagne to the north and Cassis to the south, with hills to the east extending to the Massif de Saint-Cyr.

=== Climat ===
Carnoux-en-Provence benefits from a Mediterranean weather.

=== Adjacent towns ===
- Aubagne to the north and west;
- Cassis to the south;
- Roquefort-la-Bédoule to the southeast and east.

== List of mayors ==
List of mayors of Carnoux-en-Provence
Term start	Term end	Name	Affiliation
January 1967	March 1971	Pierre Maret	
March 1971	December 1977 (resignation)	Adolphe Faure	
January 1978	March 1983	Marc Laprie	
March 1983	March 2001	Jean Chaland	DVD
March 2001	In office	Jean-Pierre Giorgi	DVD

== See also ==
- Communes of the Bouches-du-Rhône department
