= Roland Giberti =

French politician

Mayor of Gémenos
- Incumbent
- Assumed office 2001

Member of the General Council of Bouches-du-Rhône
- Incumbent
- Assumed office 2004
- Constituency: Canton of Aubagne-Est

Vice-president of Marseille Provence Métropole Urban Community

Personal details
- Born: 1951 (age 74–75) Gémenos, Bouches-du-Rhône, France
- Party: Nouveau Centre
- Occupation: Politician, mathematics teacher

Roland Giberti, born in Gémenos (Bouches-du-Rhône department, Provence-Alpes-Côte-d'Azur region)) in 1951, is a French politician belonging to the Nouveau Centre party.

Trained as a mathematics teacher, he was elected mayor of Gémenos in 2001, after having served eighteen years (since 1983) as a member of the city council. He was elected representative in the general council (Conseil général) of the Bouches-du-Rhône department in 2004 for the canton of Aubagne-Est. He is also vice-president of the Urban Community of Marseille Provence Métropole.
