= 1st-11th Cuirassier Regiment =

Former tank regiment of the French Army

1er-11e Régiment de Cuirassiers
- Active: 5 June 1999 – 29 July 2009
- Country: France
- Branch: French Army
- Type: Armoured Cavalry
- Role: Armoured warfare Raiding; Reconnaissance
- Size: 1350 personnel
- Part of: 3rd Mechanised Brigade
- Garrison/HQ: Carpiagne (Carnoux-en-Provence)
- Equipment: Leclerc

The 1st–11th Cuirassier Regiment (French: 1er-11e Régiment de Cuirassiers, 1er-11e RC) was an armoured (tank) regiment of the French Army. It was the armoured component of the 3rd Mechanised Brigade from 1 July 1999.

== History ==
The Chief of Staff of the French Army decided on 1 September 1990 to create a new experimental armoured regiment of 80 tanks with two squadron groups (Groupes d'Escadrons, GE). Each group would consist of three combat squadrons and one command and logistics squadron.

The 1er-11e RC was formed on 5 June 1999 by merging the 1st Cuirassier Regiment and the 11th Cuirassier Regiment. It was disbanded 29 July 2009.

== Organization ==
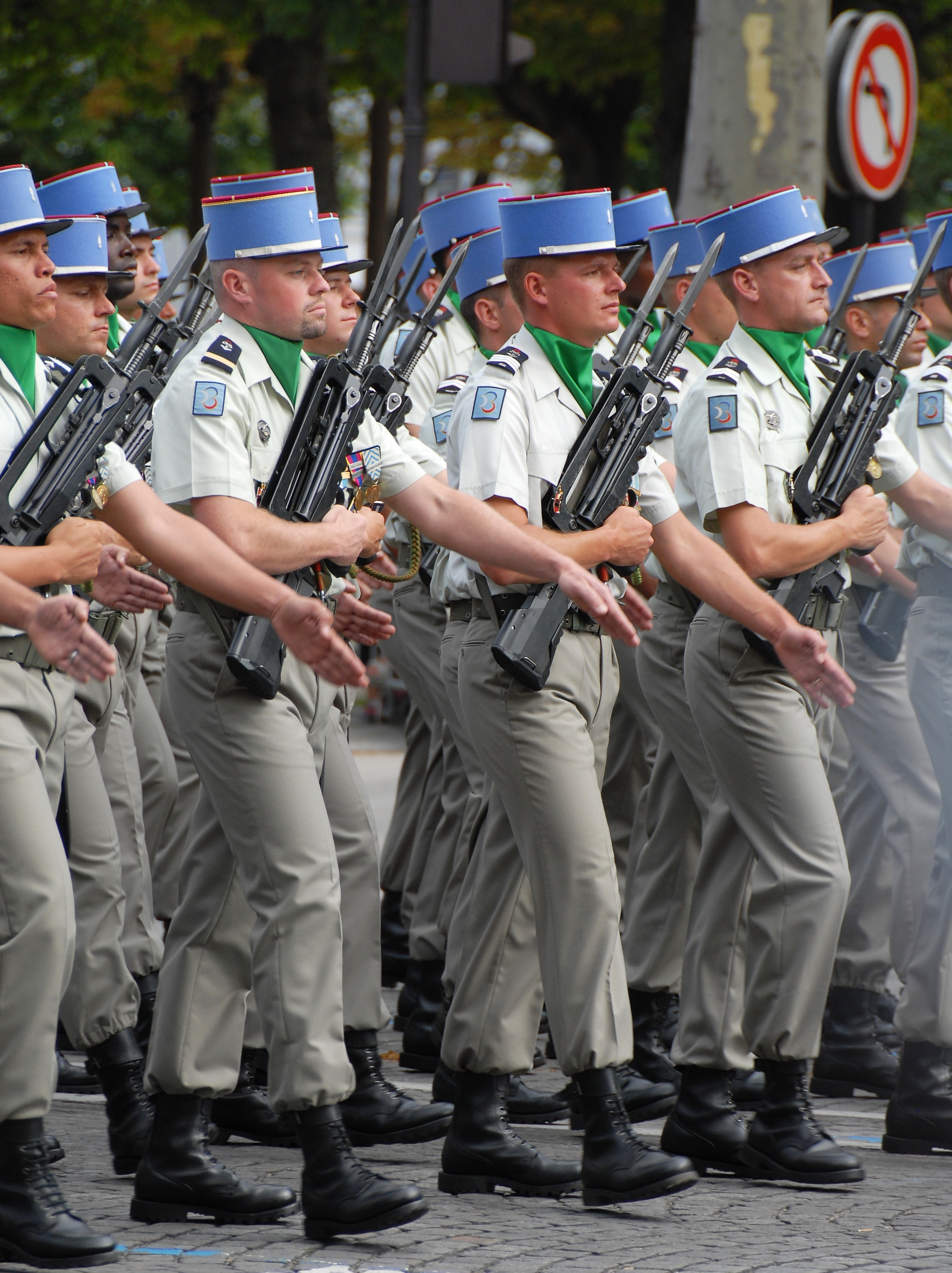
Men of the 1st–11th Cuirassier Regiment on the 2007 Bastille Day parade at the Champs-Élysées

The regiment was composed of around 1350 personnel organized into 13 Squadrons.

- 1st Cuirassier Groupe d'Escadron (1er CGE) – 1st Cuirassier Squadron Group (x40 MBTs)
  - ECL – Command and Logistics Squadron
  - 1e Esq – 1st Squadron
  - 2e Esq – 2nd Squadron
  - 3e Esq – 3rd Squadron
- 11e Cuirassier Groupe d'Escadron (11e CGE) – 11th Cuirassier Squadron Group (x40 MBTs)
  - ECL – Command and Logistics Squadron
  - 1e Esq – 1st Squadron
  - 2e Esq – 2nd Squadron
  - 3e Esq – 3rd Squadron
- EBI – Base and Instructions Squadron
- EMR – Regimental Maintenance Squadron
- ESGM – Garrison Support & Maintenance Squadron
- EEI – Reconnaissance Squadron
- 5e Esq – 5th Squadron (Reserve)

== Commanding officers ==
List of Commanding Officers (French: Chefs de corps) since 1999.

=== 1st–11th Cuirassier Regiment ===
- Colonel Dumont Saint Priest, July 1999
- Colonel de Courreges d'Ustou, July 2001
- Colonel Hautecloque Raysz, July 2003
- Colonel Pillet, July 2005

=== 1st Cuirassier Squadrons Group ===
- Lieutenant Colonel Guillemet, July 1999
- Lieutenant Colonel Darnaudat, July 2001
- Lieutenant Colonel Beaussant, July 2003
- Lieutenant Colonel Fremin du Sartel, July 2005

=== 11th Cuirassier Squadrons Group ===
- Lieutenant Colonel Galy-Dejean, July 1999
- Lieutenant Colonel Tavernier, July 2001
- Lieutenant Colonel Isabellon, July 2003
- Lieutenant Colonel Philipeau, July 2005
