= Canton of La Ciotat =

Coordinates: 43°10′25″N 5°36′36″E

La Ciotat
- Canton
- Interactive map of La Ciotat
- Country: France
- Region: Provence-Alpes-Côte d'Azur
- Department: Bouches-du-Rhône
- No. of communes: {{{nbcomm}}}

Government
  - Representatives (2021–2028): Danielle Milon and Patrick Ghigonetto
- Area: 187.10 km^{2} (72.24 sq mi)
- Population (2023): 75,487
  - Density: 403.46/km^{2} (1,045.0/sq mi)
- INSEE code: 1308

The canton of La Ciotat is a canton located within the Bouches-du-Rhône department of France.

== Composition ==
Since the French canton reorganisation which came into effect in March 2015, the communes of the canton of La Ciotat are:

1. Carnoux-en-Provence
2. Cassis
3. Ceyreste
4. La Ciotat
5. Cuges-les-Pins
6. Gémenos
7. Roquefort-la-Bédoule

== See also ==
- Cantons of the Bouches-du-Rhône department
- Communes of the Bouches-du-Rhône department
