= Prince Josias of Saxe-Coburg-Saalfeld =

18th-century nobleman and military commander

Prince Frederick Josias of Saxe-Coburg-Saalfeld
- Friedrich Josias von Sachsen-Coburg-Saalfeld
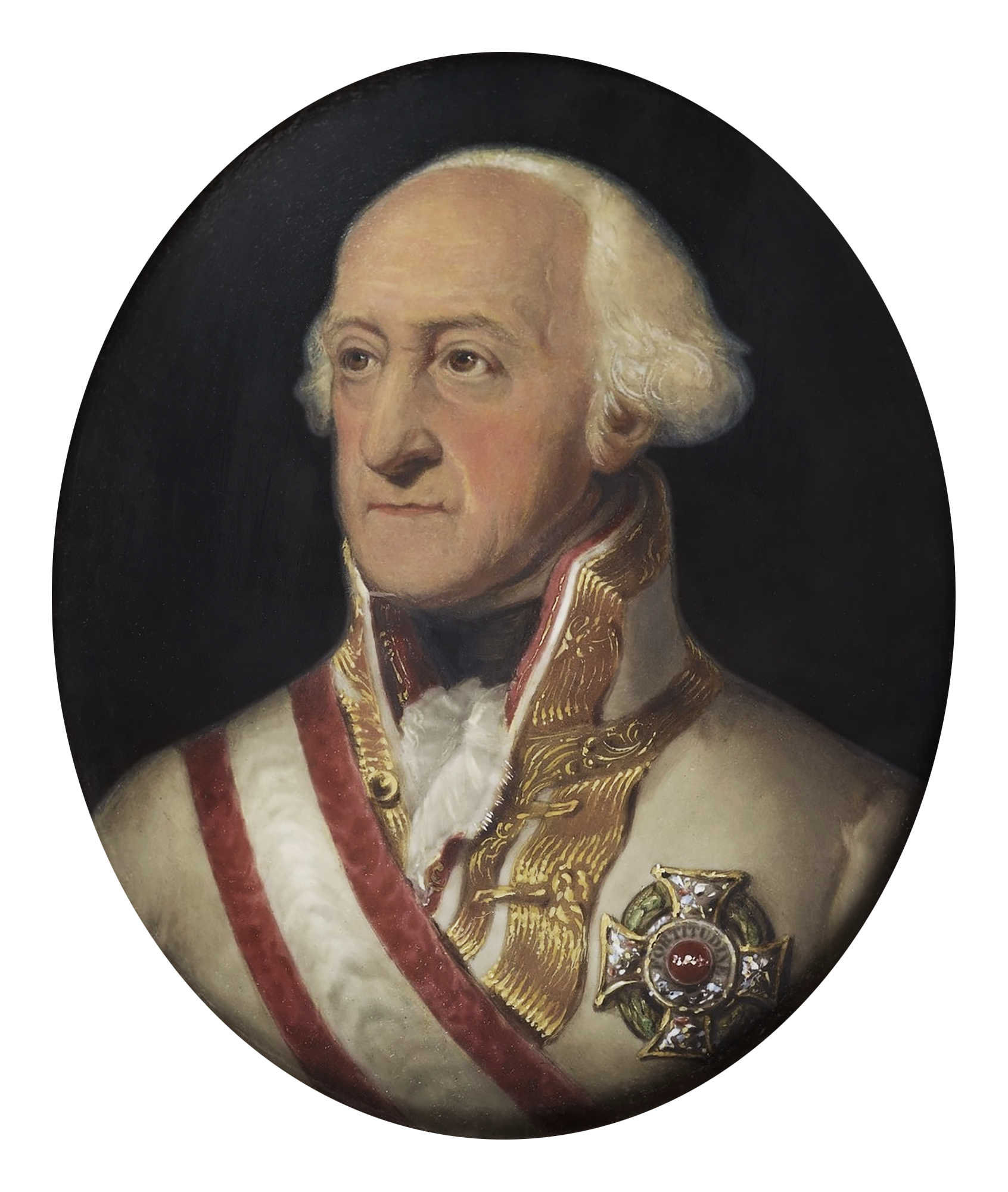
- Portrait by William Essex after an 1810 original by Ferdinand Jagemann
- Born: 26 December 1737; Coburg, Saxe-Coburg-Saalfeld
- Died: 26 February 1815 (aged 77); Coburg, Saxe-Coburg-Saalfeld
- Relatives: Francis Josias, Duke of Saxe-Coburg-Saalfeld (father); Princess Anna Sophie of Schwarzburg-Rudolstadt (mother)
- Military career
- Allegiance: Holy Roman Empire
- Branch: Army
- Service years: 1756–1794
- Rank: Generalfeldmarschall
- Conflicts: See battles: Seven Years' War; Battle of Lobositz; Battle of Prague; Battle of Hochkirch; Battle of Landshut; Battle of Liegnitz; War of the Bavarian Succession; Austro-Turkish War (1788–1791); Siege of Khotin; Battle of Focșani; Battle of Rymnik; Siege of Giurgiu; Battle of Calafat; French Revolutionary Wars; War of the First Coalition; Battle of Aldenhoven; Siege of Maastricht; Battle of Neerwinden; Battle of Raismes; Battle of Famars; Battle of Caesar's Camp; Battle of Wattignies; Battle of Tourcoing; Battle of Tournay; Battle of Fleurus
- Awards: Military Order of Maria Theresa

Prince Frederick Josias of Saxe-Coburg-Saalfeld (German: Friedrich Josias von Sachsen-Coburg-Saalfeld; 26 December 1737 – 26 February 1815) was a military commander in the army of the Holy Roman Empire. He began his career at the age of 18 in a cavalry regiment with which he took part in the Seven Years' War. Coburg's bravery allowed him to quickly rise through the ranks. Promoted to colonel in 1759, he became a general officer in the following years and, in this capacity, took command of an army corps during the Austro-Turkish War. Coburg campaigned successfully in Moldavia where he won the battles of Focşani, Rymnik and Martinestje against the Ottomans, which earned him the rank of field marshal in 1789.

Thanks to his extensive experience, Coburg was appointed supreme commander of the Imperial Army in the Austrian Netherlands at the beginning of the French Revolutionary Wars. He triumphed at the Battle of Aldenhoven, then at the Battle of Neerwinden in March 1793, but these victories were overshadowed some time later by his defeat at the Battle of Wattignies. In 1794, Coburg was defeated by General Jean-Baptiste Jourdan at the Battle of Fleurus and had to abandon the Austrian Netherlands to the French. He was relieved of his command following this setback and retired to his lands in Coburg. Coburg was also Inhaber (owner) of a dragoon regiment from 1769 to 1802 and of an infantry regiment from 1802 to 1815.

== Biography ==
Frederick Josias of Saxe-Coburg-Saalfeld was born in Coburg on the night of 26 to 27 December 1737. He was the youngest child of Duke Franz Josias of Saxe-Coburg-Saalfeld and Princess Anna Sophie of Schwarzburg-Rudolstadt. He joined the Army of the Holy Roman Empire on 4 January 1756 as a Rittmeister in the Anspach Cuirassier Regiment No. 33. Coburg, then aged 18, first saw action in the Seven Years' War, in which he distinguished himself. He fought at the battles of Lobositz, Prague and Hochkirch, where he was seriously wounded, then at Landshut and Liegnitz. In the meantime, Coburg was promoted to Oberstleutnant on 16 April 1758 and to Oberst (colonel) on 16 January 1759.

After the end of hostilities, Coburg was successively promoted to Major-General on 30 July 1766, to Feldmarschall-Leutnant on 1 May 1773 and to General der Kavallerie on 22 August 1786, in addition to the post of military governor of Galicia and Bukovina. He also became Inhaber (owner) of the Dragoon Regiment No. 37 in 1769. Coburg then fought in the War of the Bavarian Succession from 1778 to 1779. In 1788, he was sent to the Ottoman front at the head of an army corps and invaded Moldavia. After a series of victories against Ibrahim Nasir Pasha's army, Coburg laid siege to Khotyn on 15 May. The city capitulated on 16 September, delivering a large amount of equipment to the Imperials.

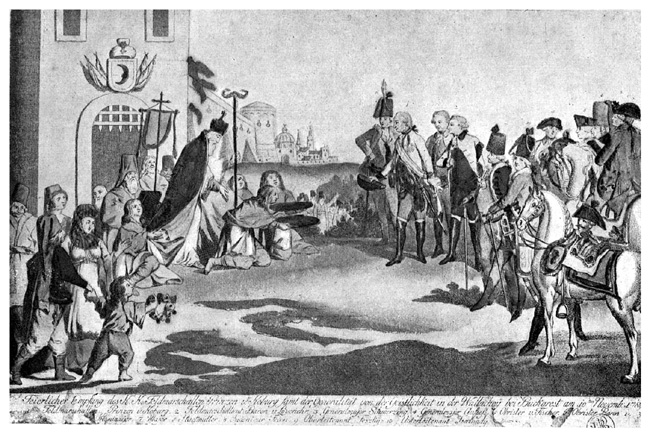
Reception of the Prince of Saxe-Coburg by the people of Bucharest, 1789

Coburg followed up his success and, with the help of General Suvorov's Russian troops, defeated the Ottomans at Battle of Focşani on 21 July 1789. Knighted in the Military Order of Maria Theresa, he scored another victory over the Turks at the Battle of Rymnik on 22 September, and emerged victorious at Martinestje the following day. Following this engagement, Coburg was promoted to Generalfeldmarschall on 3 October. He then set out to conquer Wallachia and seized Bucharest, where he was enthusiastically welcomed by the population. He concluded his campaign with the capture of Orșova in April 1790.

=== French Revolutionary Wars ===
==== Early victories in Belgium and France ====
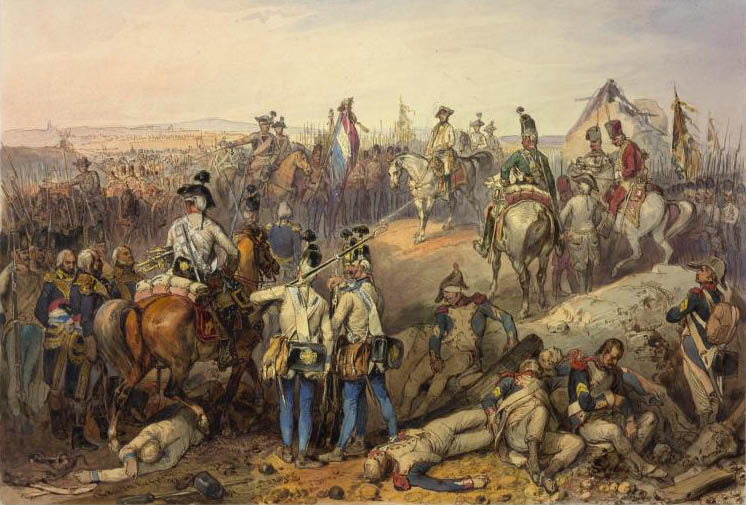
Coburg receiving captured French generals after the Battle of Neerwinden. Watercolor by Peter Johann Nepomuk Geiger.

In February 1793, Coburg was made Reichsgeneralfeldmarschall, a rank confirmed to him by decree on 8 April, and commander-in-chief of the imperial army in the Austrian Netherlands (Belgium). The Holy Roman Empire was then taking part in the War of the First Coalition against Revolutionary France. On 1 March, Coburg attacked the French reserve corps under the command of General Lanoue at Aldenhoven; charged by the imperial cavalry, the revolutionary troops were routed, losing 2,300 men, seven cannons and two flags. Two days later, the French abandoned the Siege of Maastricht. On 18 March, Coburg clashed with the French army of General Charles François Dumouriez at the Battle of Neerwinden. The forces were balanced at around 40,000 men on each side. In a defensive position, the prince divided his army into three groups: Archduke Charles on the right, Colloredo and the Duke of Württemberg in the center and finally Clerfayt on the left with the reserves. The French attacked in the morning, pushed back the left flank of the Imperials and took Neerwinden, but Clerfayt managed to restore the situation and recaptured the village after a fierce fight. Despite continuous assaults, Dumouriez failed to break through Coburg's lines. He ordered a retreat on the morning of 19 March, after losing 5,000 men and 30 cannons against 2,800 Austrian casualties.

The victory at Neerwinden opened the way into Belgium to Coburg's army. At this stage, the prince was in favour of a diplomatic agreement with France to end the war, even going so far as to declare: "I am the ally of all friends of order, ready to renounce all projects of conquest carried out in the name of emperors". Harshly reprimanded by the government in Vienna, he was nevertheless forced into action. The Coalition forces, comprising the imperial army and the British-Hanoverian corps, to which was added a Dutch contingent, then totalled 118,000 men under Coburg's command. He quickly besieged Condé and Valenciennes, which capitulated in July 1793, creating a breach in the French defensive system. In parallel with the siege operations, Coburg won the battles of Raismes on 8 May and Famars on 23 May. He then obtained the surrender of Le Quesnoy on 13 September, but his allies failed to take Dunkirk. The strategic situation nevertheless remained very favourable to the Coalition: "only Maubeuge [...] remained in the hands of the French. However, if it fell in turn, a large breach would open up in the border protection system. Nothing would stop Coburg's army from marching on Paris and, then, only a battle in the open countryside would make it possible to redress the situation".

==== Defeats at Wattignies and Fleurus ====
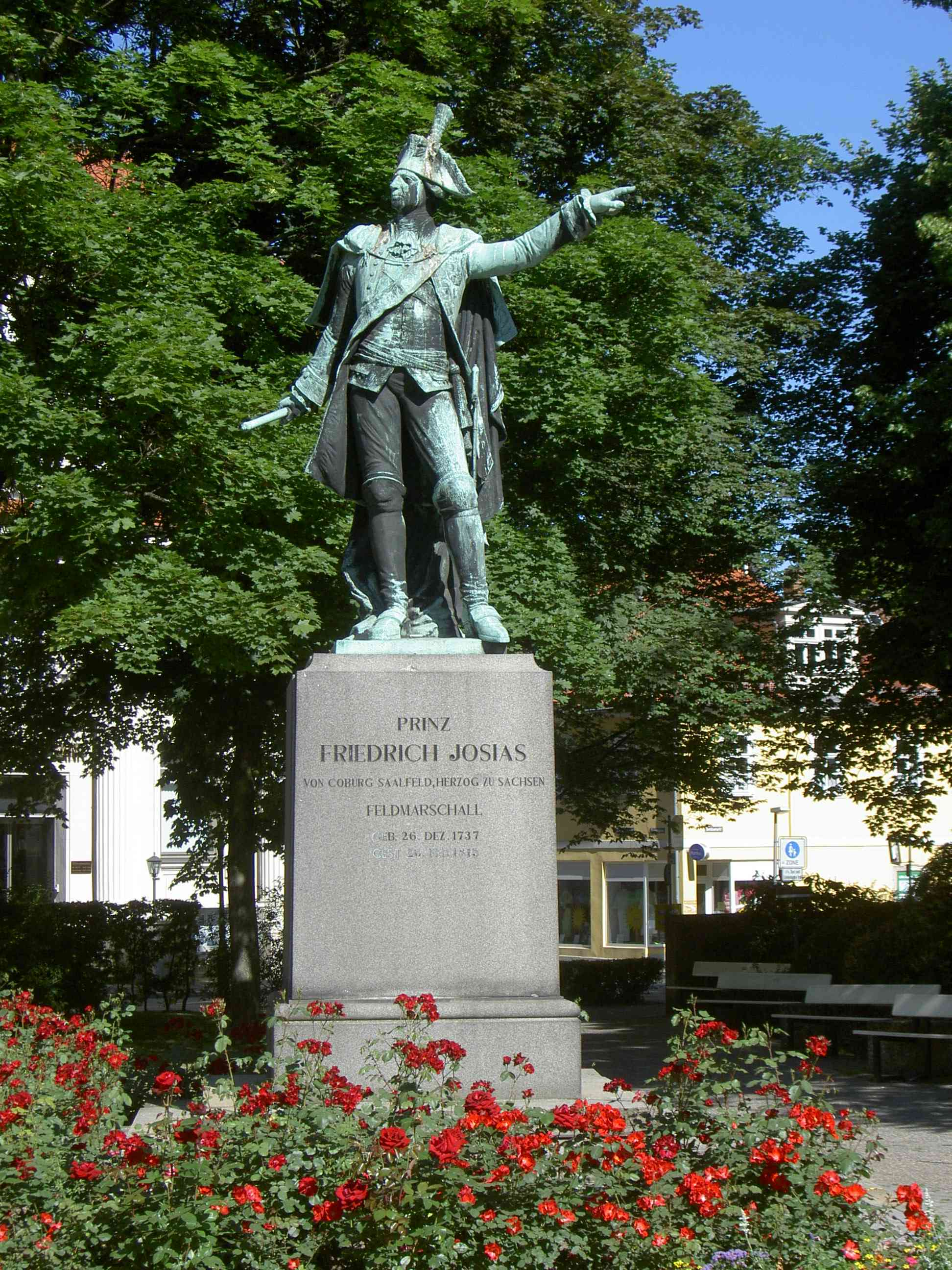
Statue of the Prince of Saxe-Coburg-Saalfeld in his native Coburg, Germany.

While Cambrai and Bouchain, lacking garrisons, were at Coburg's mercy, the commander of the imperial army chose first to take Maubeuge, which he placed under siege on 30 September 1793. General Jean-Baptiste Jourdan, the new commander-in-chief of the French Army of the North, pressed by the Committee of Public Safety, decided to go on the offensive to defeat Coburg's forces and relieve Maubeuge. The imperial army took up position on the heights of Wattignies, which the prince had fortified and equipped with artillery. Confident in his chances of success, the prince declared: "if they get here, I'll become a sans-culotte!", though the phrase is possibly apocryphal. The Battle of Wattignies began on 15 October. French attacks followed one another all day long but were repelled on the right, left and centre, to the point that Coburg believed the battle had been won. However, the fighting resumed the next day with the same intensity; led by Jourdan and representative on mission Carnot, the French took control of the field despite the efforts of Coburg's troops. Reinforced late by the Duke of York, Coburg ordered a retreat behind the Sambre and lifted the Siege of Maubeuge. His army went into winter quarters shortly afterwards and remained inactive until the following year.

In April 1794, Coburg launched an offensive against the fortress of Landrecies which, according to the Coalition strategy, was to serve as a concentration point for the Allied armies before they began the march on Paris. Coburg had around 100,000 men at his disposal for this campaign, divided between the forces of the Count of Kaunitz on the left, his own in the centre and those of the Count of Clerfayt on the right. Having recently arrived at the army headquarters in Valenciennes, Emperor Francis II himself led the whole operation, thus replacing Coburg as supreme commander of the Coalition forces. Landrecies, after a brief siege, capitulated on 30 April 1794 despite General Pichegru's attempts to relieve it. The rivalries and lack of coordination between the generals, however, affected the cohesion of the Allied high command. Coburg was severely defeated at the Battle of Tourcoing on 18 May, leaving 5,500 casualties and six cannons on the battlefield. Mack, his chief of staff, who before the battle had talked about "exterminating" the French army, was replaced. The prince won a rematch a few days later at the Battle of Tournai where he forced Pichegru to retreat after inflicting 6,000 casualties on his army. The Emperor returned to Vienna on June 13, allowing Coburg to resume overall command of operations.

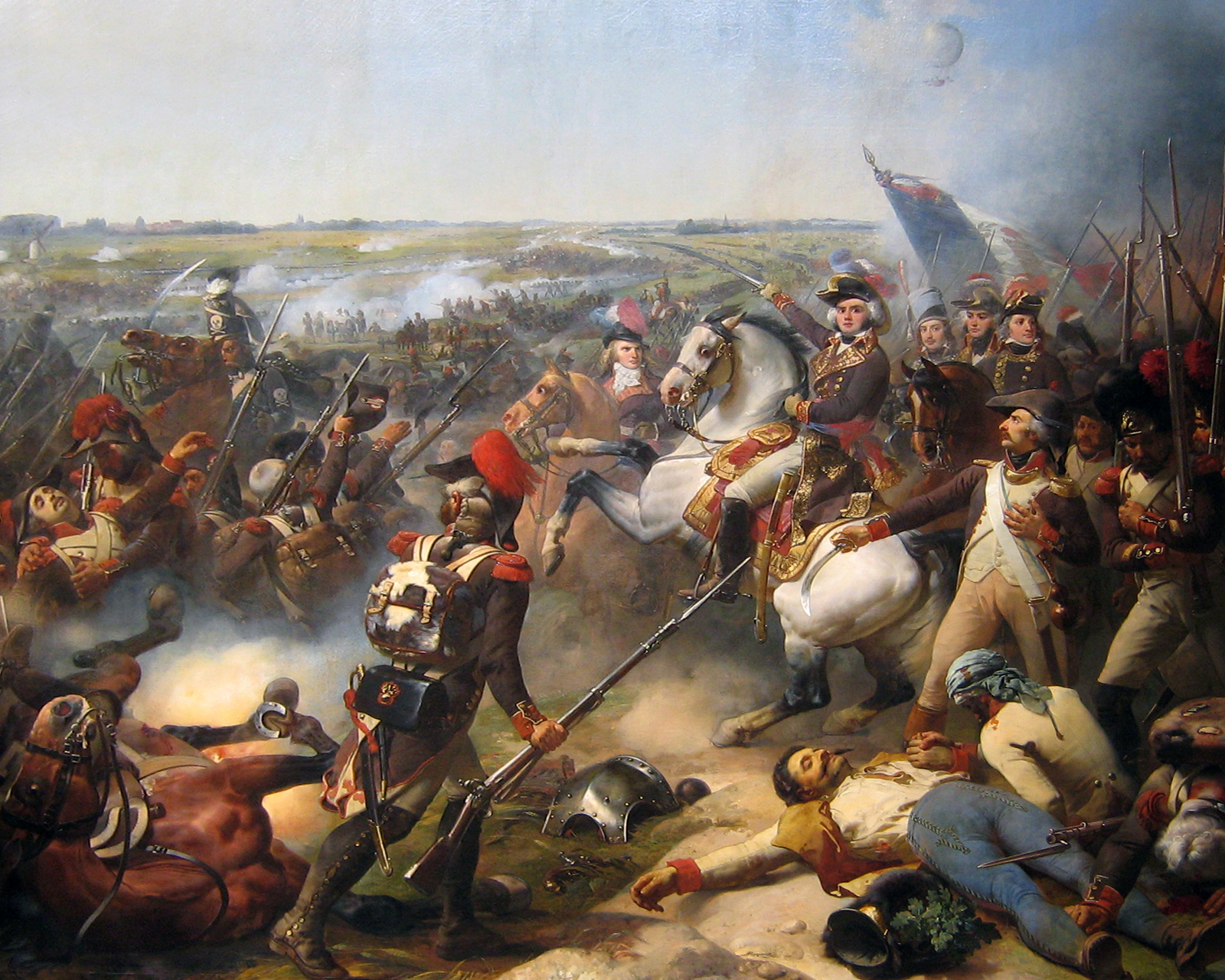
The Battle of Fleurus on 26 June 1794, where the Prince of Coburg was defeated by General Jourdan. Painting by Jean-Baptiste Mauzaisse, 1837.

Coburg then faced two French armies, soon to be reinforced by a third under the command of Jourdan. On 12 May, the French general had already succeeded in expelling Beaulieu from the town of Arlon; then, pushing back Kaunitz's corps, Jourdan's troops crossed the Sambre and laid siege to Charleroi. Faced with the urgency of the situation, Kaunitz requested the support of Coburg. The latter, after several days of forced marches, finally arrived near the city on 26 June and immediately prepared to go to battle, unaware that Charleroi had surrendered to the besiegers the day before. The French forces entrenched themselves on the heights of Fleurus, with Kléber at Trazegnies, Championnet at Heppignies and the Marceau and Lefebvre divisions at Lambusart. Supervising the operations on the left wing himself, Coburg delegated command of the center to General Quasdanovich and of the right wing to the Prince of Orange. The Allied attacks were however carried out without any coordination. Orange struck first but was held in check in front of Trazegnies; Quasdanovich then managed to briefly control Heppignies before being driven out by a combined counterattack by Jourdan's and Championnet's troops. Finally, Coburg engaged last with the right column with which he headed towards Lambusart. The Marceau division was quickly overwhelmed by superior numbers and it took the intervention of Lefebvre, then of the reserves commanded by Jourdan, to drive the Imperials out of the area. Held in check on the entire front, and informed in the meantime of the capitulation of Charleroi, Coburg decided to retreat. Both armies suffered around 5,000 casualties.

=== Later life ===
Coburg's defeat at Fleurus led to the loss of Brussels on 10 July and, in a few months, of all of Belgium. On the 16 July, shortly after the fall of Namur, he was defeated by Jourdan one last time near Leuven. Following this final setback, Coburg asked to be relieved of his command and blamed the defeat on his subordinates, whom he accused of having deliberately caused the campaign to fail in order to intrigue against him. The prince was dismissed from his duties on 9 August 1794 and was replaced on 1 September by the Count of Clerfayt. He then retired to his lands in Cobourg where he died on 26 February 1815, at the age of 77.

== Family ==
Coburg married morganatically Therese Stroffeck in 1789. Their son Friedrich (1789–1873) was unable to claim his father's titles but was made Baron of Rohmann (Freiherr von Rohmann). Frederick Josias was the younger brother of Christian Francis of Saxe-Coburg-Saalfeld (1730–1797), who also served the Imperial Army, reaching the rank of Major-General. His nephew, Louis Charles Frederick of Saxe-Coburg-Saalfeld (1755–1806), became a Feldmarschall-Leutnant in 1796. Coburg was the great-uncle of King Leopold I of Belgium and the great-great-uncle of Queen Victoria of the United Kingdom.

== Ancestry ==
Ancestors of Prince Josias of Saxe-Coburg-Saalfeld

8. Ernest I, Duke of Saxe-Gotha
4. John Ernest IV, Duke of Saxe-Coburg-Saalfeld
9. Elisabeth Sophie of Saxe-Altenburg
2. Francis Josias, Duke of Saxe-Coburg-Saalfeld
10. Josias II, Count of Waldeck-Wildungen
5. Charlotte Johanna of Waldeck-Wildungen
11. Wilhelmine Christine of Nassau-Siegen
1. Prince Josias of Saxe-Coburg-Saalfeld
12. Albert Anton, Prince of Schwarzburg-Rudolstadt
6. Louis Frederick I, Prince of Schwarzburg-Rudolstadt
13. Emilie Juliane of Barby-Mühlingen
3. Anna Sophie of Schwarzburg-Rudolstadt
14. Frederick I, Duke of Saxe-Gotha-Altenburg
7. Anna Sophie of Saxe-Gotha-Altenburg
15. Magdalena Sibylle of Saxe-Weissenfels

== See also ==
- Low Countries theatre of the War of the First Coalition

== Sources ==
- Birnstiel, Frédéric Guillaume (1768). Genealogie ascendante jusqu'au quatrieme degre inclusivement de tous les Rois et Princes de maisons souveraines de l'Europe actuellement vivans [Genealogy up to the fourth degree inclusive of all the Kings and Princes of sovereign houses of Europe currently living]. Bordeaux.
- Dodge, Theodore Ayrault (2011). Warfare in the Age of Napoleon: The Revolutionary Wars Against the First Coalition in Northern Europe and the Italian Campaign, 1789-1797. Leonaur Ltd. ISBN 978-0-85706-598-8.
- Ebert, Jens-Florian. "Feldmarschall Prinz von Sachsen-Coburg-Saalfeld". Die Österreichischen Generäle 1792-1815.
- Fortescue, John W. (1918). British Campaigns in Flanders 1690-1794 (extracts from Volume 4 of A History of the British Army). London: Macmillan.
- Hulot, Frédéric (2013). "Le maréchal Jourdan". Les grands maréchaux de Napoléon. Pygmalion. ISBN 978-2-7564-1081-4.
- Phipps, Ramsay Weston (2011). The Armies of the First French Republic: Volume I: The Armée du Nord. Pickle Partners Publishing. ISBN 978-1-908692-24-5.
- Smith, Digby (1998). The Napoleonic Wars Data Book. London: Greenhill. ISBN 1-85367-276-9.
- Smith, Digby; Kudrna, Leopold (2008). "A Biographical Dictionary of all Austrian Generals during the French Revolutionary Wars and Napoleonic Wars 1792-1815: Sachsen-Coburg-Saalfeld, Friedrich Josias Prinz von". The Napoleon Series.
