= Henri Christian Michel de Stengel =

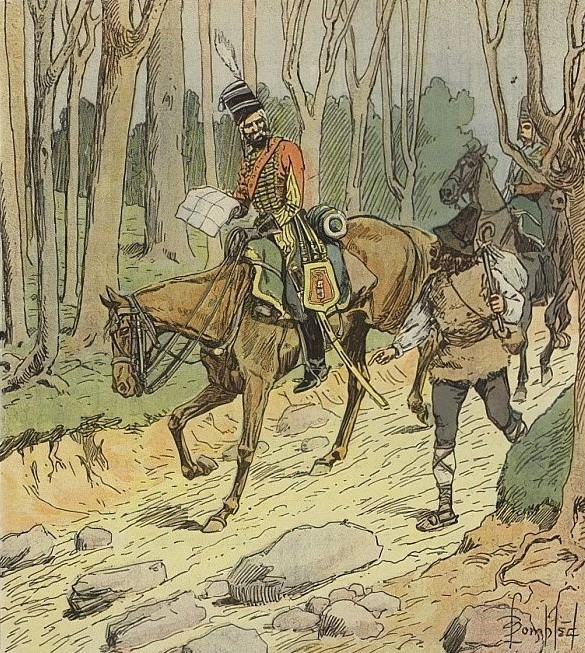
Henri Christian Michel de Stengel

Henri Christian Michel de Stengel (11 May 1744 – 28 April 1796) joined the French royal army, rapidly rose to general officer rank during the French Revolutionary Wars, and was mortally wounded in the Italian campaign while serving in General Napoleon Bonaparte's army.

== Early career ==
Born in Neustadt an der Weinstraße in the Electorate of Bavaria in 1744, Stengel joined the Bavarian army's Palatine Guards in 1758. He entered the French army in 1760 and fought in the Seven Years' War. He became a lieutenant in 1762, a captain in 1769, and a major in 1788. After the French Revolution he was appointed colonel of the 1st Hussar Regiment.

== French Revolutionary Wars ==
Soon after, Stengel served as a general of brigade in the Army of the North at the Battle of Valmy in September 1792. Still under the command of Charles Dumouriez, he fought at the Battle of Jemappes in November 1792. Later that year, he led Dumouriez's advance guard in successful actions at Mechelen (Malines) and Voroux-les-Liers in the Austrian Netherlands. On 1 March 1793, he was defeated at Aldenhoven and the next day driven out of Aachen by the Allies. For this he was arrested and tried before a Revolutionary Tribunal. He was acquitted but retired from military service.

Restored to favor, Stengel was reappointed general of brigade on 1 March 1795. Promoted to general of division on 13 June, he was transferred to command the cavalry of the Army of Italy. At the Battle of Mondovì on 21 April 1796 he was seriously wounded in the arm while leading a charge against the Sardinian Army. On 28 April he died in Carassonne following a surgery in which his arm was amputated. He was buried in the church of San Giovanni in Lupazzanio beside the altar "A cornu epistulae" (at the right side).

At Saint-Helena, Napoleon wrote of Stengel, "Adroit, intelligent, alert; was a true general of outposts, collecting all military and topographic information without being directed; combined the qualities of youth with the experience of age."
