= Siege of Khotyn (1788) =

Battle in the Austro-Turkish War of 1788-1791

Coordinates: 48°30′N 26°30′E

- Part of the Austro-Turkish War (1788–1791) and the Russo-Turkish War (1787–1792)
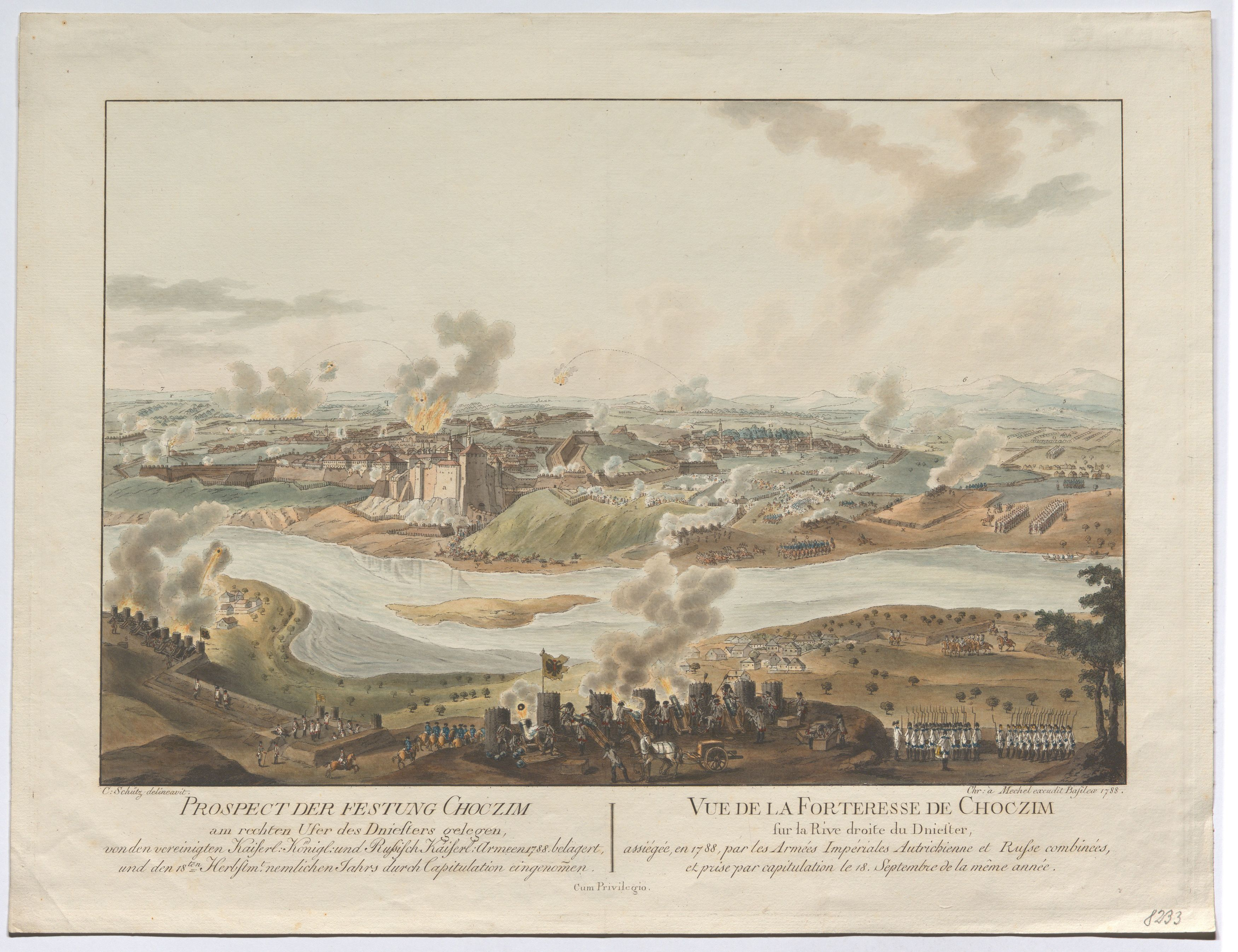
- Siege of the Khotyn Fortress
Date	2 July – 19 September 1788
Location	Khotyn, modern-day Ukraine
Result	Austro-Russian victory

Belligerents
Habsburg monarchy Russian Empire	Ottoman Empire

Commanders and leaders
(Habsburg monarchy) Josias of Coburg (Russian Empire) Ivan Saltykov	Pasha of Khotyn

Strength
(Habsburg monarchy) 18,000	

The siege of Khotyn took place in Khotyn, modern-day Ukraine, in 2 July–19 September 1788, and was part of the Austro-Turkish War and the Russo-Turkish War. The Habsburg Austrian army of 18,000 men led by Prince Josias of Saxe-Coburg-Saalfeld marched from Bukovina to lay siege to Khotyn. It was joined by an Imperial Russian army commanded by Ivan Saltykov. The combined Russian–Austrian forces besieged the Ottoman garrison in the fortress of Khotyn (also Khotin, Hotin) led by the Pasha of Khotyn, who held out for more than two months before capitulating. The Allies eventually forced the surrender of the fortress. Under the terms of surrender, any resident of Khotyn who wished to leave could join the Turks, who were allowed to march out with flags flying. The civilian refugees were to be provided with food and given 3,000 carts to move their possessions. This agreement, made by the Austrian generals, was ridiculed throughout Europe as too lenient. The fortress would be occupied by the Russians until the end of the Russo-Turkish war in 1792.
