= Ceyreste =

Commune in Provence-Alpes-Côte d'Azur, France

Ceyreste Ceiresta (Occitan)
- Commune
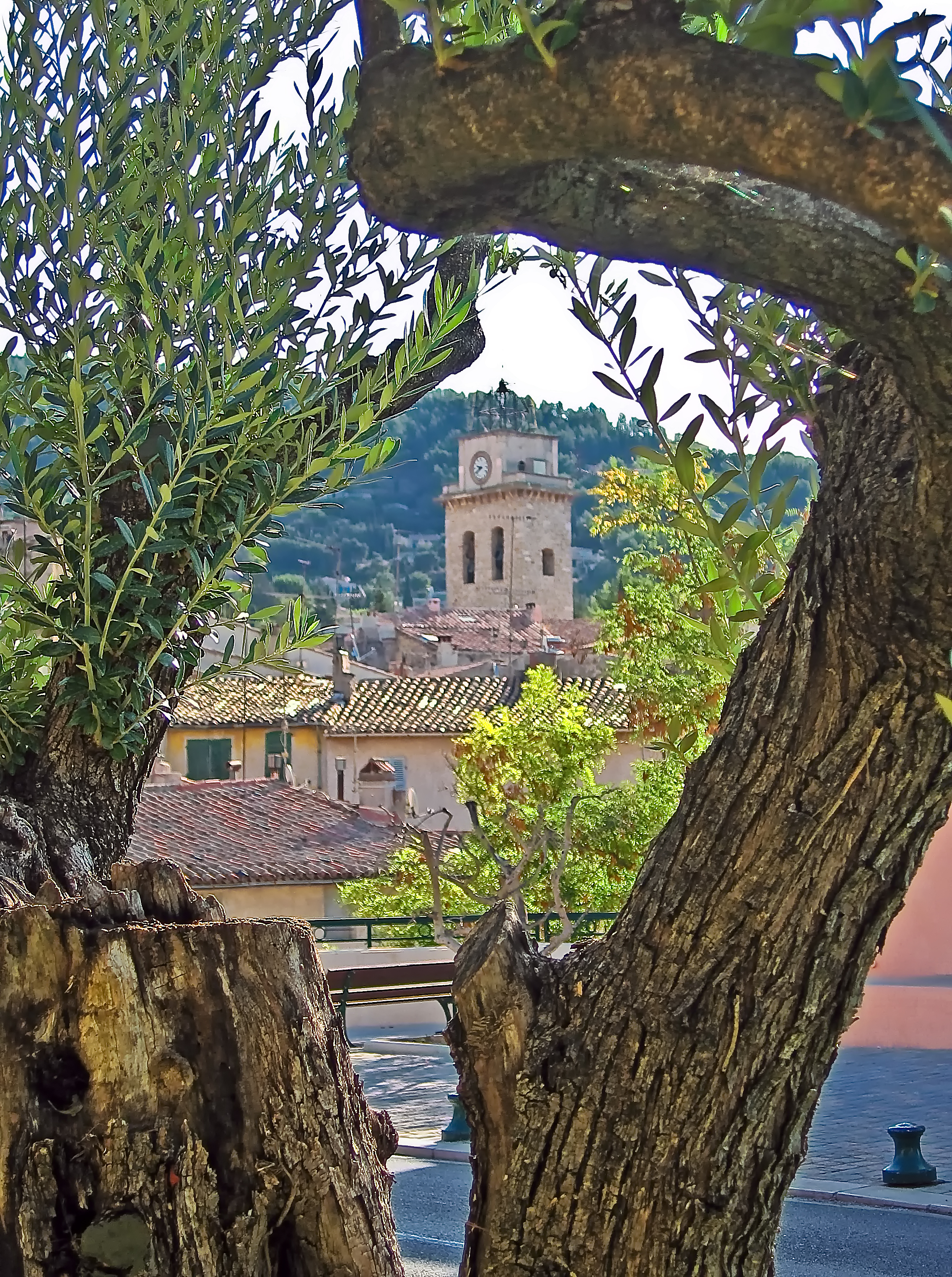
- The bell tower of Ceyreste

- Coat of arms
- Location of Ceyreste
- Location within France Location within Provence-Alpes-Côte d'Azur
- Coordinates: 43°12′49″N 5°37′47″E
- Country: France
- Region: Provence-Alpes-Côte d'Azur
- Department: Bouches-du-Rhône
- Arrondissement: Marseille
- Canton: La Ciotat
- Intercommunality: Aix-Marseille-Provence

Government
  - Mayor (2026–32): Patrick Ghigonetto
- Area^{1}: 22.61 km^{2} (8.73 sq mi)
- Elevation: 74 m (243 ft)
- Highest elevation: 501 m (1,644 ft)
- Lowest elevation: 57 m (187 ft)
- Population (2023): 4,863
  - Density: 215.1/km^{2} (557.1/sq mi)
- Demonym: Ceyrestens
- Time zone: UTC+01:00 (CET)
  - Summer (DST): UTC+02:00 (CEST)
- INSEE/Postal code: 13023 /13600
- Dialling codes: 0442
- Website: www.ceyreste.fr
- ^{1} French Land Register data, which excludes lakes, ponds, glaciers > 1 km^{2} (0.386 sq mi or 247 acres) and river estuaries.

Ceyreste (French pronunciation: [seʁɛst]; Occitan: Ceiresta or Ceirèsto) is a commune in the Bouches-du-Rhône department in the Provence-Alpes-Côte d'Azur region in southern France. It is located about 23 km (14.3 mi) east of Marseille, on the departmental border with Var, at La Cadière-d'Azur.

== Population ==
Its inhabitants are called Ceyrestens (masculine) and Ceyrestennes (feminine) in French.

Historical population

Year	Pop.	±% p.a.
1793	660	—
1800	638	−0.48%
1806	675	+0.94%
1821	722	+0.45%
1831	700	−0.31%
1836	702	+0.06%
1841	665	−1.08%
1846	620	−1.39%
1851	645	+0.79%
1856	684	+1.18%
1861	729	+1.28%
1866	632	−2.82%
1872	608	−0.64%
1876	610	+0.08%
1881	587	−0.77%
1886	592	+0.17%
1891	629	+1.22%
1896	636	+0.22%
1901	624	−0.38%

Year	Pop.	±% p.a.
1906	553	−2.39%
1911	627	+2.54%
1921	522	−1.82%
1926	559	+1.38%
1931	591	+1.12%
1936	686	+3.03%
1946	562	−1.97%
1954	949	+6.77%
1962	1,298	+3.99%
1968	1,581	+3.34%
1975	2,037	+3.69%
1982	2,544	+3.23%
1990	3,004	+2.10%
1999	3,636	+2.14%
2007	4,139	+1.63%
2012	4,178	+0.19%
2017	4,584	+1.87%
2023	4,863	+0.99%

Source: EHESS and INSEE (1968–2023)

== See also ==
- Communes of the Bouches-du-Rhône department
- Antoine Sartorio
