= Gémenos =

Commune in Provence-Alpes-Côte d'Azur, France

- Commune
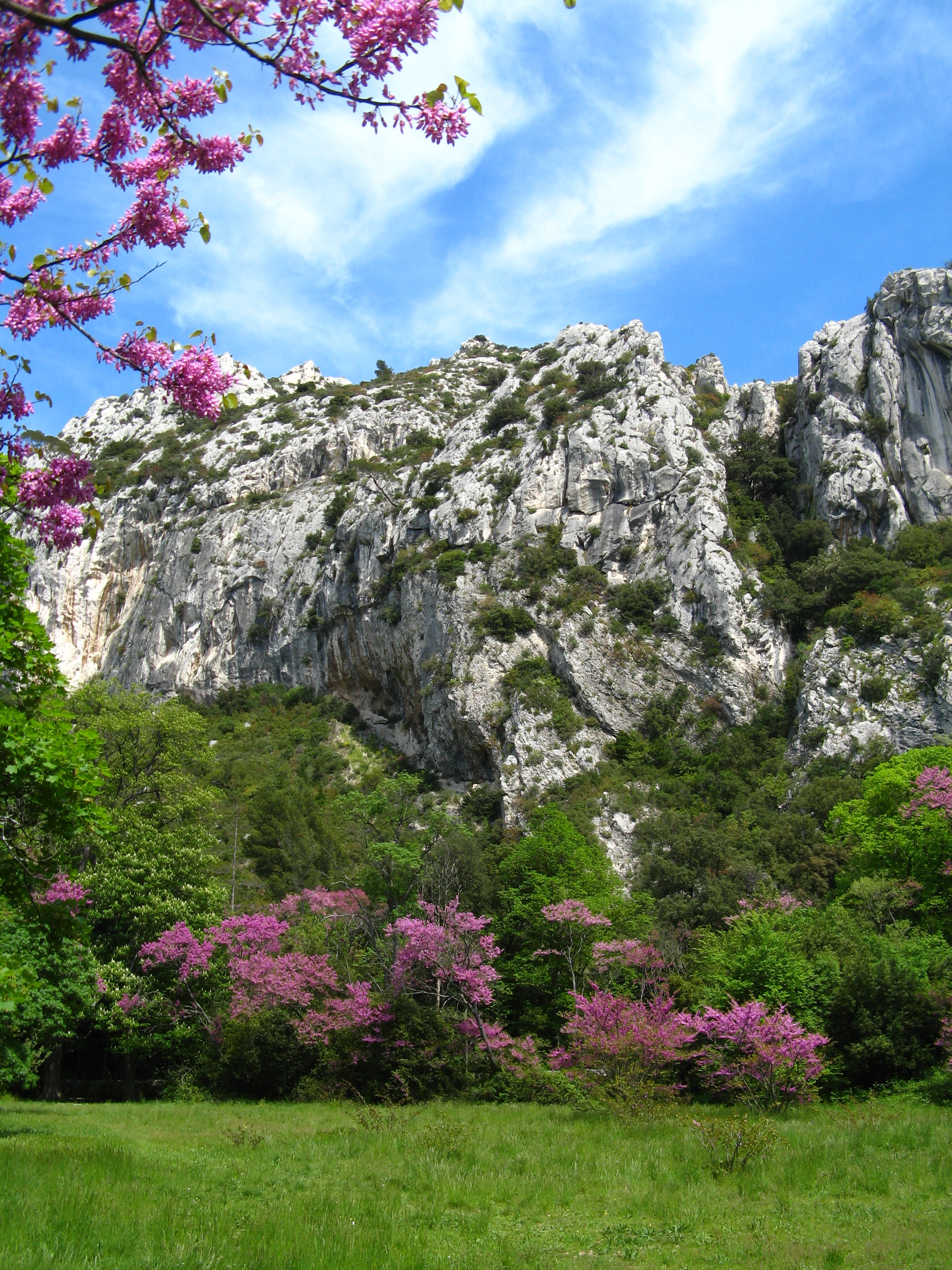
- Saint-Pons Park

- Coat of arms
- Location of Gémenos
- Location within France Location within Provence-Alpes-Côte d'Azur
- Coordinates: 43°17′46″N 5°37′37″E
- Country: France
- Region: Provence-Alpes-Côte d'Azur
- Department: Bouches-du-Rhône
- Arrondissement: Marseille
- Canton: La Ciotat
- Intercommunality: Aix-Marseille-Provence

Government
  - Mayor (2026–32): Roland Giberti
- Area^{1}: 32.75 km^{2} (12.64 sq mi)
- Highest elevation: 1,041 m (3,415 ft)
- Lowest elevation: 104 m (341 ft)
- Population (2023): 6,579
  - Density: 200.9/km^{2} (520.3/sq mi)
- Time zone: UTC+01:00 (CET)
  - Summer (DST): UTC+02:00 (CEST)
- INSEE/Postal code: 13042 /13420
- Dialling codes: 0442
- ^{1} French Land Register data, which excludes lakes, ponds, glaciers > 1 km^{2} (0.386 sq mi or 247 acres) and river estuaries.

Gémenos (French pronunciation: [ʒɛm(ə)nɔs]; Occitan: Gèmas) is a commune located 20 kilometers east of Marseille in the Bouches-du-Rhône department in the Provence-Alpes-Côte d'Azur region in southern France.

== Population ==
Historical population

Year	Pop.	±% p.a.
1793	1,408	—
1800	1,115	−3.28%
1806	1,229	+1.64%
1821	1,447	+1.09%
1831	1,832	+2.39%
1836	1,835	+0.03%
1841	1,802	−0.36%
1846	1,809	+0.08%
1851	1,861	+0.57%
1856	1,815	−0.50%
1861	1,752	−0.70%
1866	1,660	−1.07%
1872	1,486	−1.83%
1876	1,534	+0.80%
1881	1,564	+0.39%
1886	1,554	−0.13%
1891	1,468	−1.13%
1896	1,498	+0.41%
1901	1,555	+0.75%

Year	Pop.	±% p.a.
1906	1,510	−0.59%
1911	1,444	−0.89%
1921	1,520	+0.51%
1926	1,430	−1.21%
1931	1,437	+0.10%
1936	1,547	+1.49%
1946	2,008	+2.64%
1954	2,194	+1.11%
1962	2,597	+2.13%
1968	2,807	+1.30%
1975	3,029	+1.09%
1982	4,548	+5.98%
1990	5,025	+1.25%
1999	5,481	+0.97%
2007	5,945	+1.02%
2012	6,198	+0.84%
2017	6,502	+0.96%
2023	6,579	+0.20%

Source: EHESS and INSEE (1968-2023)

== History ==
Excavations at Gémenos uncovered an ancient road and buildings likely marking a roman settlement entrance (1st–3rd century AD). Finds indicate vineyards, a possible bath complex for travelers, and craft activities like metalworking.

A property abstract belonging to Wilhem, Count of Marseille, dating back to February 9 934, noted for the first time the existence of a castrum named Geminas at the entry of the Saint Pons valley.

In 1204, the bishop of Marseille Rainier founded the Cistercian abbey of Saint Pons.

Around the 15th century, Geminas was deserted.

In 1563 the Marquis d'Albertas Nicolas and his brother Gaspard, both of Italian origin, acquired the demesne of Gémenos, leading to the development of Gémenos as it is known today.

== See also ==
- Communes of the Bouches-du-Rhône department
