= Siege of Maastricht (1793) =

Siege of the War of the First Coalition

- Part of the Flanders campaign in the War of the First Coalition
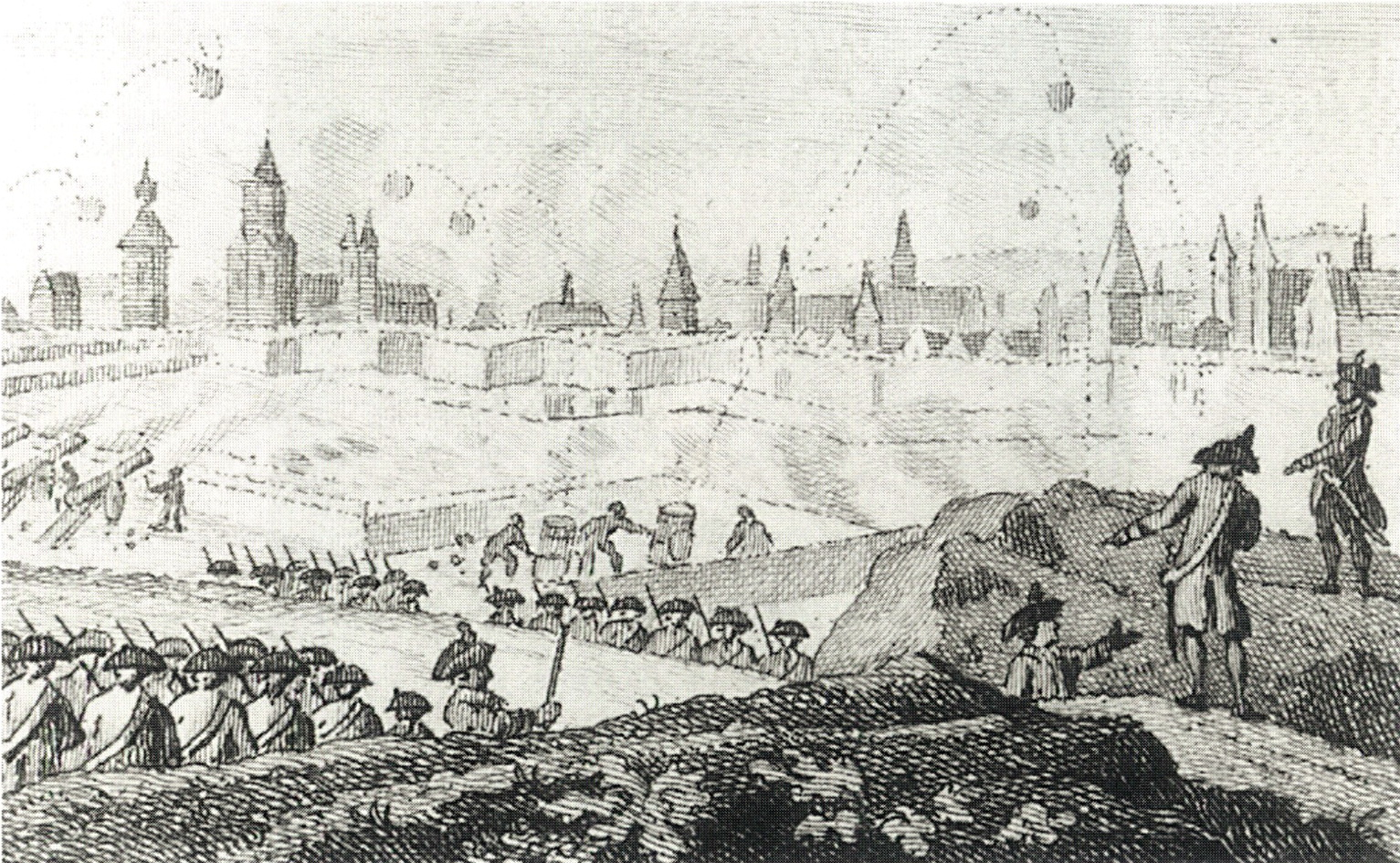
- Bombing of Maastricht, 1793
Date	2 March 1793
Location	Maastricht, Limburg, Netherlands 50°51′N 5°41′E
Result	Coalition victory

Belligerents
(French First Republic) France	Dutch Republic: Armée des Émigrés; (Habsburg monarchy) Austria (Kingdom of Prussia) Prussia

Commanders and leaders
(French First Republic) Francisco de Miranda	(Dutch Republic) Prince Frederick; Jean Thérèse (Habsburg monarchy) Prince Josias

Strength
15,000	4,500; 1,200; 50,000; 20,000

Casualties and losses
Unknown	Unknown
- Location within Netherlands Siege of Maastricht (1793) (Europe)

The siege of Maastricht was a failed siege of the city of Maastricht by the forces of the French First Republic from 6 February to 2 March 1793, marking the final action of the 1793 campaign of the War of the First Coalition. The city was successfully defended by the Dutch garrison with the assistance of a small band of French Royalists.

== Course ==
On 29 November 1792, John Skey Eustace sent a letter to the commander of Maastricht, Prince Frederick of Hesse-Kassel, demanding the surrender of French emigrants who had taken refuge in the city. He then personally visited Maastricht, where he dined with the German commander in Austrian service. As a result, he was removed from command on 13 December and a few days later succeeded by Francisco de Miranda. Dumouriez ordered Eustace to report to the National Convention. Eustace ignored the order and, claiming to be dangerously ill, retired to Tongerlo Abbey, where he resisted an attempt to question and arrest him.

It was the last of several French Republican sieges during 1792–1793. Inspired by military successes in the Austrian Netherlands, the French First Republic declared war on the Dutch Republic and England on 1 February 1793. General Charles-François Dumouriez invaded the Dutch Republic from the south-west, aiming for Breda, while Miranda advanced along the river Meuse towards the heavily-fortified city of Maastricht. Miranda hoped to take the city in a few days with only 15,000 men and invested it from the Wyck suburb side. The Dutch garrison of 4,500 men was led by the governor of Maastricht, Prince Frederick of Hesse-Kassel. They were assisted by around 1200 French Royalists of the Armée des Émigrés, including 300 officers, under the command of Jean Thérèse de Beaumont d'Autichamp, a former cavalry general of the French royal army.

On 6 February, De Miranda completed the circumvallation of Maastricht and Wyck. Sapping took around two weeks, after which the city was heavily bombed for ten days. More than 800 buildings were destroyed.

Marat accused Eustace and Miranda of the failure of the Siege of Maastricht, and Dumouriez planned to send him to Paris to explain his behavior before the Convention Nationale. However, Eustace ignored the order and, claiming to be dangerously ill, retired to the Tongerlo Abbey, where he successfully resisted an attempt to question and arrest him.

After the Austrian victory at the nearby Battle of Aldenhoven on 1 March, the French Republican lines were themselves besieged by 50,000 Austrians and 20,000 Prussians, led by Prince Josias of Saxe-Coburg-Saalfeld. Miranda ordered a retreat on 2 March, described by some as a "flight".

On 4 March, the Prince of Coburg held a triumphal entrance in the city, followed by a Te Deum in the Church of Saint Servatius. A year and a half later, Jean-Baptiste Kléber was more successful. He conquered the city in 45 days, after which Maastricht was part of France for twenty years.

== Sources ==
- Jaspar, E., Kint geer eur eige stad?, pages 96-98. Maastricht, 1968
- Rickard, J., Siege of Maastricht, 23 February-3 March 1793, 2009
