= Battle of Aldenhoven (1793) =

Battle of the War of the First Coalition

- Part of the Flanders Campaign in the War of the First Coalition
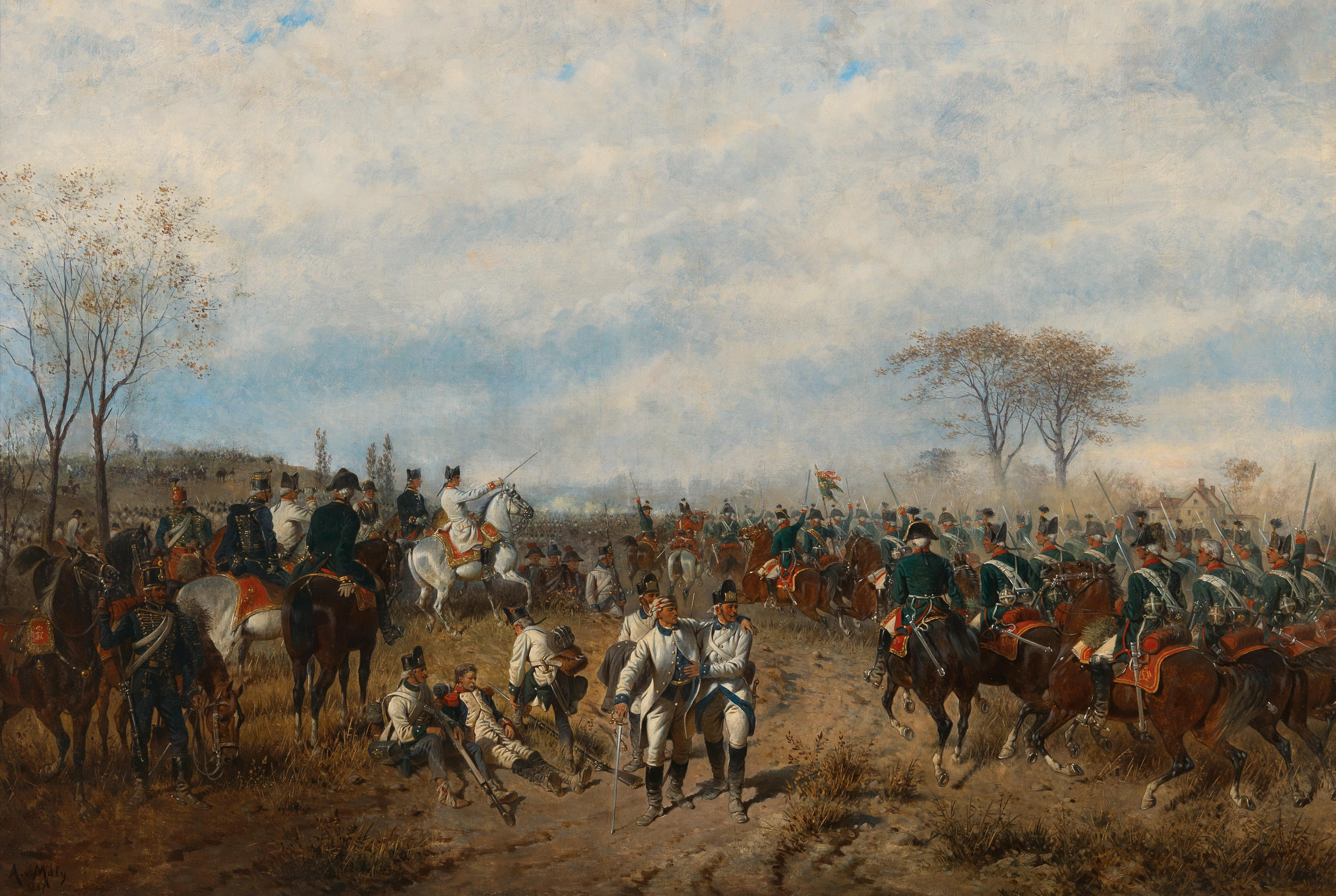
- Archduke Charles at the Battle of Aldenhoven by August von Maly, 1887
Date	1 March 1793
Location	Aldenhoven, Germany 50°53′45″N 6°16′59″E
Result	Austrian victory

Belligerents
(Habsburg monarchy) Habsburg Austria	Republican France

Commanders and leaders
(Habsburg monarchy) Prince of Coburg (Habsburg monarchy) Archduke Charles	(France) René de Lanoue (France) Henri de Stengel

Strength
39,000	9,000

Casualties and losses
50	2,300, 7 guns, 2 colors

The Battle of Aldenhoven (1 March 1793) saw the Habsburg Austrian army commanded by Prince Josias of Saxe-Coburg-Saalfeld attack a Republican French force under René Joseph de Lanoue. The Austrians successfully crossed the Roer River and engaged in a cavalry charge led by Archduke Charles, Duke of Teschen which routed the French and inflicted heavy losses. The War of the First Coalition battle occurred near Aldenhoven, a city in North Rhine-Westphalia, Germany located about 55 kilometres (34 mi) west of Cologne.

After a victory in the Battle of Jemappes on 6 November 1792, the French army of Charles Francois Dumouriez conquered most of the Austrian Netherlands. That winter, Dumouriez attempted to overrun the Dutch Republic while Francisco de Miranda besieged Maastricht, covered by Lanoue's troops along the Roer. Sent by the Austrian government to reconquer Belgium, Coburg's troops attacked early on the morning of 1 March and dispersed the French. The Battle of Neerwinden on 18 March would decide who controlled the Austrian Netherlands.

== Battle ==
In the decisive charge, Archduke Charles, Duke of Teschen led the Latour Dragoon Regiment Nr. 31 and the Esterhazy Hussar Regiment Nr. 32. Lanoue had on hand 9,000 troops in seven battalions, six squadrons and 12 artillery pieces. The French units were the 3rd and 4th Grenadier Battalions, Liège Battalion, 14th Light Infantry Battalion, 2nd Battalion of the Paris National Guard, two battalions of the 29th Line Infantry Regiment and the 6th and 12th Chasseurs à Cheval. Henri Christian Michel de Stengel was one of Lanoue's subordinates.

== Results ==
The Coalition suffered 50 casualties while the French suffered 2,000. In addition, 300 men, seven field pieces and two colors were captured by the Coalition. One of the colors was taken from the 29th Line. This defeat caused the siege of Maastricht to be abandoned. For three days Stengel disappeared and it was feared that he had defected. Instead, he turned up at Namur with a squadron of the 12th Chasseurs and the army's military pay chest. On 9 March, three French armies reassembled at Leuven (Louvain) under the command of Francisco de Miranda. They were the Army of the North on the left, the Army of Belgium in the center and the Army of the Ardennes on the right.
