= Battle of Raismes =

French Revolutionary Wars (1793)

- Part of the Flanders campaign in the War of the First Coalition
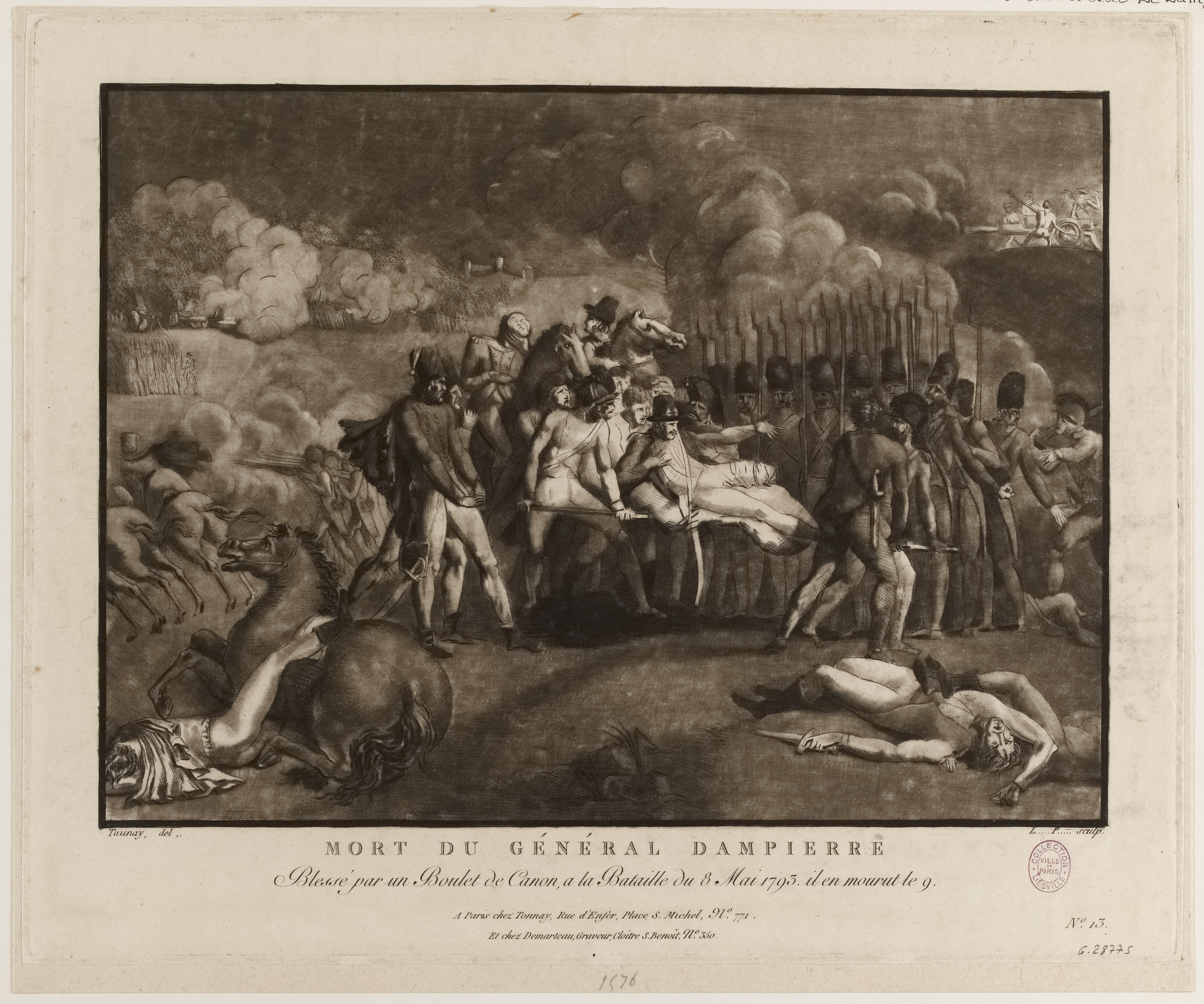
- Death of General Dampierre by Nicolas-Antoine Taunay, 1793-1798
Date	8–9 May 1793
Location	near Raismes, Austrian Netherlands
Result	Coalition victory

Belligerents
Habsburg Monarchy; Great Britain; Kingdom of Prussia	French Republic

Commanders and leaders
(Habsburg monarchy) Prince Coburg (Habsburg monarchy) François de Clerfayt (Kingdom of Great Britain) Duke of York (Kingdom of Prussia) A. von Knobelsdorff	Marquis de Dampierre (DOW); François Lamarche

Strength
60,000	30,000

Casualties and losses
600–870	2,100

The Battle of Raismes, also known as the Battle of Condé or St. Amand, (8 May 1793) saw the French Republican army led by Auguste Marie Henri Picot de Dampierre attack the Allied Coalition army of Prince Josias of Saxe-Coburg-Saalfeld. The French intended to raise the Siege of Condé, but were defeated by Coalition forces. The battle was fought during the Flanders Campaign in the War of the First Coalition. After hard fighting, the French were driving back a Prussian force when British reinforcements arrived to stabilize the situation. Dampierre was fatally wounded while leading a final unsuccessful assault. The Allies recaptured the lost ground two days later.

== Background ==
=== Plans ===
On 18 March 1793, the Allies under Prince Coburg defeated the French at the Battle of Neerwinden. Very quickly the French armies withdrew from the Austrian Netherlands and the Dutch Republic and reassembled behind the French frontier. The French commander Charles François Dumouriez briefly attempted to use the army to overthrow the National Convention. However, the coup failed and Dumouriez defected to Habsburg Austria on 5 April along with several generals including Louis Philippe, Duke of Chartres and Jean-Baptiste Cyrus de Valence. Dumouriez had turned over the French War Minister, Pierre de Ruel, marquis de Beurnonville to the Austrians, so that the office was henceforth controlled by the extreme Jacobin faction. After Dumouriez's treason, French generals in the field were regarded with suspicion and were often denounced by the all-powerful Representatives on Mission or agents of the War Office.

When Dampierre was the commandant of Le Quesnoy, he refused to go along with Dumouriez's plot, so the French government selected him to lead the armies facing Flanders. The French forces were reorganized into the Army of the North under Dampierre and the subordinate Army of the Ardennes under François Joseph Drouot de Lamarche. The Army of the North contained the main French field forces. The Army of the Ardennes had a very weak field force, since it was mostly distributed in garrisons. While visiting the Kingdom of Prussia before the war, Dampierre became so enamored of its military system that he effected Prussian manners and dress. King Louis XVI once remarked of Dampierre, "Have you seen that lunatic with his Prussian manners?"

On 8 April 1793, the Allied army advanced to besiege the fortress of Condé-sur-l'Escaut, held by a 4,300-man French garrison. By mid-May, Coburg expected to employ 92,000 Coalition troops, while an additional 5,000 Austrian and 8,000 Hessian reinforcements would arrive in June. When complete, Coburg's army would number 105,200 soldiers, including 55,000 Austrians, 15,000 Dutch, 8,000 Prussians, 12,000 Hanoverians, 8,000 Hessians, and 7,200 British. Of these, the Hanoverian and Hessian soldiers were being paid by Great Britain. While blockading Condé, Coburg planned to lay siege to Valenciennes with 52,000 men, leaving 40,000 to cover the frontier between Maubeuge and Ostend. After Valenciennes fell, Coburg promised to help capture Dunkirk, which was important to the British government. Coburg was a capable commander and very popular with his soldiers. He was also slow and cautious, and he employed the cordon system where much of the army was dispersed on a wide front to cover every possible road. Coburg's chief-of-staff was Karl Mack von Leiberich who enjoyed a good reputation and who was respected by the British.

=== Forces ===
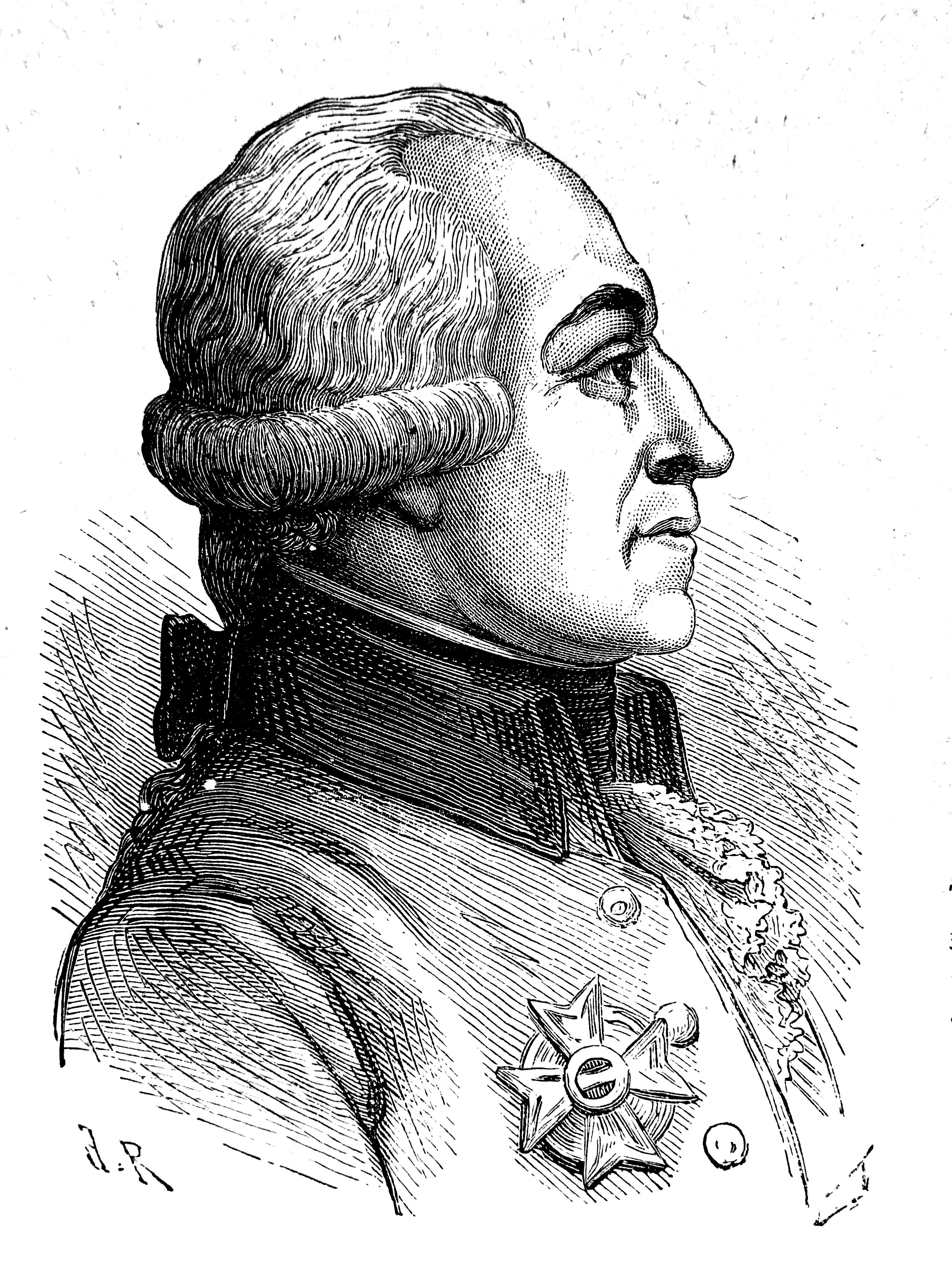
Prince Coburg

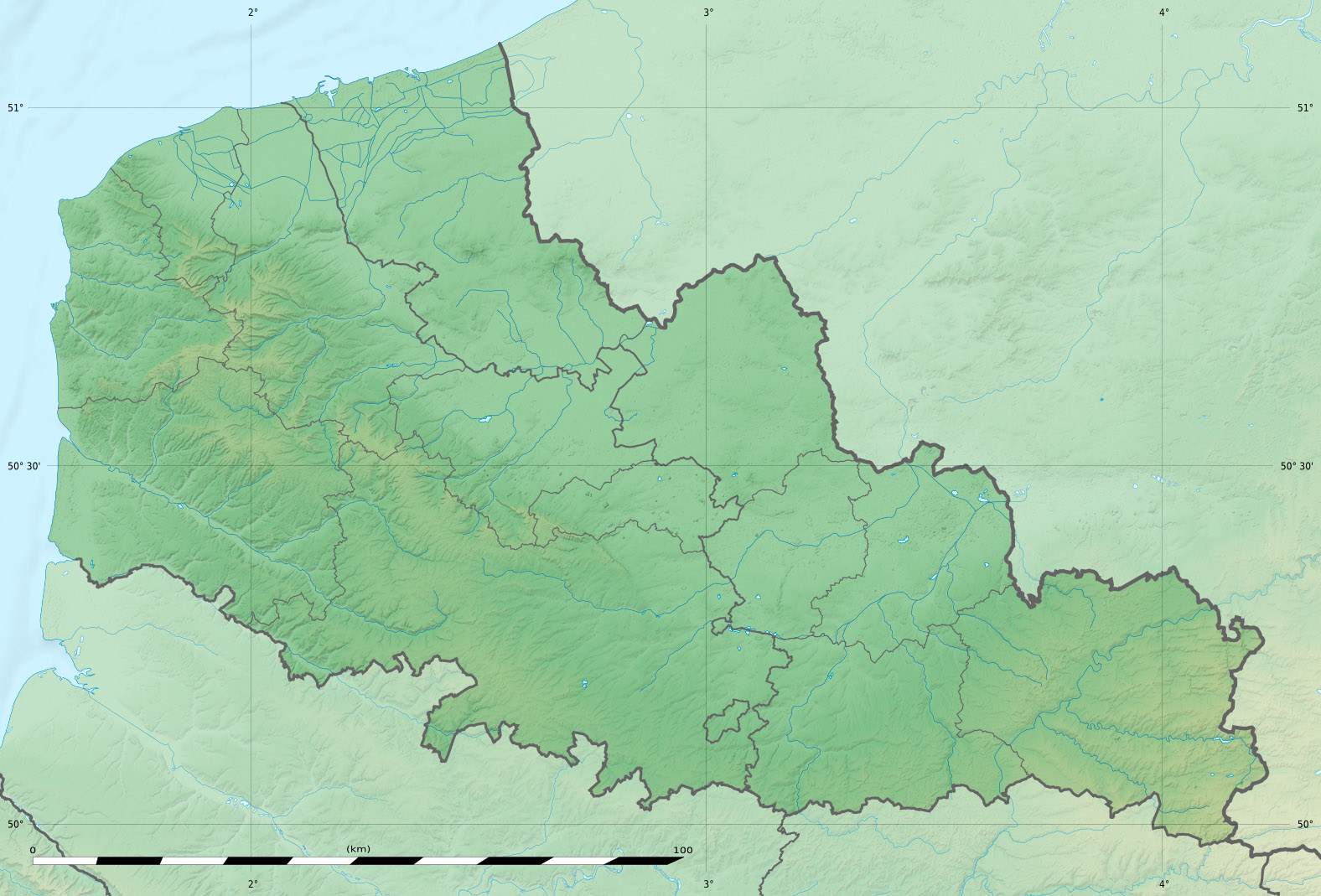
Flemish campaign: important locations, May 1793

On 15 April, Dampierre's army reoccupied the Camp of Famars near Valenciennes. Dampierre deployed 10,000 troops on his right flank under Louis-Auguste Juvénal des Ursins d'Harville between Maubeuge and Philippeville, 10,000 men on his left flank under Antoine Collier, Comte de La Marlière in an entrenched camp at Cassel, and 30,000 soldiers of the main body at the Camp of Famars. Some troops of the main body held a fortified position at Anzin northwest of Valenciennes. In addition, 5,000 men were posted in Hasnon, Nomain, and Orchies, covering the gap between Lille and Famars. Other soldiers garrisoned Dunkirk, Lille, Condé, Valenciennes, and Le Quesnoy, and were unavailable for field operations. Dampierre wished to rest his troops and wait to be reinforced, but pressure from the Representatives on Mission compelled him to act. They accused him of being insufficiently zealous for the revolution, and Dampierre complained to Louis Lahure, "Ah, I wish I might have an arm or a leg carried away, to be able to retire honorably."

On 23 April 1793, Coburg's army covered the Siege of Condé with its components distributed as follows. On his right flank 6,000 Dutch and 3,000 Imperials under William V, Prince of Orange lay at Furnes, Ypres and Menin (Menen). There were 2,500 British and the same number of Austro-Prussians under Frederick, Duke of York and Albany at Tournai. Alexander von Knobelsdorff commanded 8,000 Prussians holding the towns of Maulde, Lecelles and Saint-Amand-les-Eaux on the Scarpe River. François de Croix, Count of Clerfayt with 12,000 men was at Vicoigne and Raismes and covered the blockade of Condé on the south. Duke Frederick of Württemberg with 5,000 besieged the town on the north. Coburg's principal army of 15,000 troops lay to the south of Condé at Onnaing, with a detachment at Saint-Saulve. Maximilian Anton Karl, Count Baillet de Latour lay to the east with 6,000 men at Bettignies, observing Maubeuge, with a detachment at Bavay. Coburg's host numbered about 60,000 soldiers.

Not only was Coburg's army numerically superior to Dampierre's army, but the Allies enjoyed a large qualitative superiority over the French. At the end of April, the British cavalry and Hanoverians had not yet joined Coburg's army, but they were approaching. The Allied lines were well-entrenched. However, there were defects in Coburg's position: the Scheldt (Escaut) River split the Coalition army in half, the Allied defenses covered a too-great extent, and the supply lines for the various armies went in different directions. The British line of communications led west to the English Channel, the Dutch line went north to Antwerp, and the Austrian line led east to Namur. An Austrian general, Friedrich Wilhelm, Fürst zu Hohenlohe-Kirchberg led a 30,000-strong Imperial army covering Namur, Luxembourg City, and Trier, but this last force was not a factor in the campaign.

== Battle ==
=== 1 May action ===
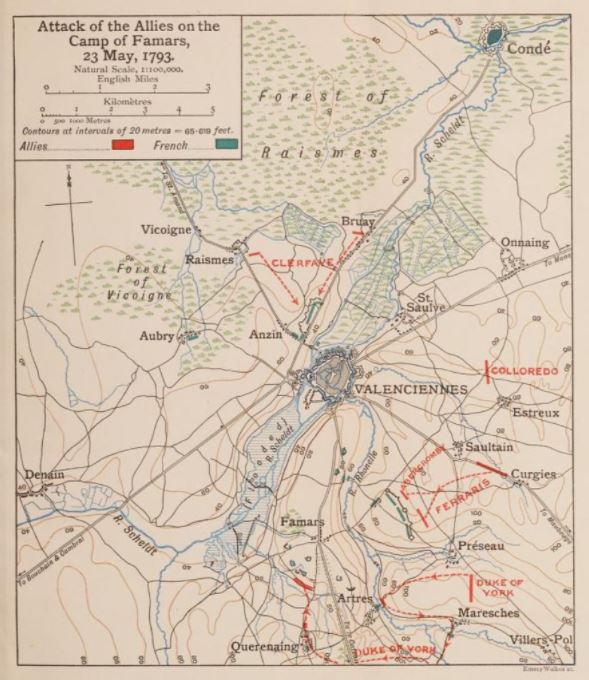
This map of a later battle shows Raismes, Vicoigne, Condé, and Valenciennes. Saint-Amand is off-map at the upper left.

Coburg allowed Dampierre to seize the initiative from his superior army. On 1 May, the French launched an assault along the length of the Allied front from Saint-Saulve to Saint-Amand. To add weight to the attack, Dampierre employed some of La Marlière's soldiers on the left and a part of Lamarche's Army of the Ardennes on his right. On the east bank of the Scheldt, a French division under Charles Joseph de Nozières d’Envezin de Rosières initially drove back the outposts of Rudolf Ritter von Otto. Joseph de Ferraris appeared with Austrian reinforcements, halted the advance and drove the French back into Valenciennes. A second French column under Lamarche set out from Curgies but the soldiers panicked after seeing a large force of Austrian cavalry under Wenzel Joseph von Colloredo approaching. Lamarche's men fled to their camp behind the Rhonelle stream, pursued by Colloredo's troops.

On the west bank of the Scheldt, Clerfayt easily repulsed Charles Edward Jennings de Kilmaine's French column from Anzin. On the left flank, La Marlière's column, which included 3,000 soldiers brought from Lille, was able to seize Saint-Amand and drive its 4,000 Prussian defenders back to Maulde. The Duke of York led forward the 1st Foot Guards and 2nd Foot Guards to help block La Marlière's assault. Not knowing how the other attacking columns fared, La Marlière withdrew. The French suffered a loss of 2,000 men and some guns.

=== 8 May action ===
Despite this setback, the Representatives on Mission insisted that Dampierre must try again to save Condé. The 1 May attack exposed the Allied right flank as too weak. Accordingly, Coburg pulled in his right flank units toward the center and assigned the Duke of York to defend Maulde. This time, Dampierre limited attacks east of the Scheldt to minor demonstrations, while concentrating his main assault against Clerfayt at Raismes and the Duke of York at Maulde and Saint-Amand. On the left flank, La Marlière mounted his attack in three columns. The right-hand column under Charles Joseph Paul Leyris Desponches attacked Vicoigne, the center column under La Marlière advanced on Saint-Amand, and the left column under Dominique-Prosper de Chermont marched on Rumegies. Dampierre himself led a frontal attack from Anzin against Raismes and Vicoigne, and after being repulsed four times eventually captured the position at Raismes, with the exception of the village itself.

Joseph de Hédouville's men seized part of Raismes, but Clerfayt brought up reserves under Franz Xaver von Wenckheim and the French were driven out. At this, Dampierre led forward eight battalions, but his thigh was struck by a cannonball which took off his leg. Lamarche assumed command, but seeing the troops become demoralized after Dampierre fell, he ordered a withdrawal. La Marlière's column took Saint-Amand, which was no longer occupied by the Prussians. One of La Marlière's divisions (Note: Presumably this was Desponches' column, though Fortescue does not say.) crossed the Scarpe and advanced undetected through the Forest of Vicoigne. These troops deployed an artillery battery where it could fire on the village of Vicoigne and constructed a redoubt. This fortification threatened to break the link between the divisions of Clerfayt and Knobelsdorff. Earlier, the Duke of York shifted the British Guards brigade to Nivelle, just north of Saint-Amand, and promised to support Knobelsdorff. At noon, the Duke of York set the 1st, 2nd, and 3rd Foot Guards in motion toward the fighting.

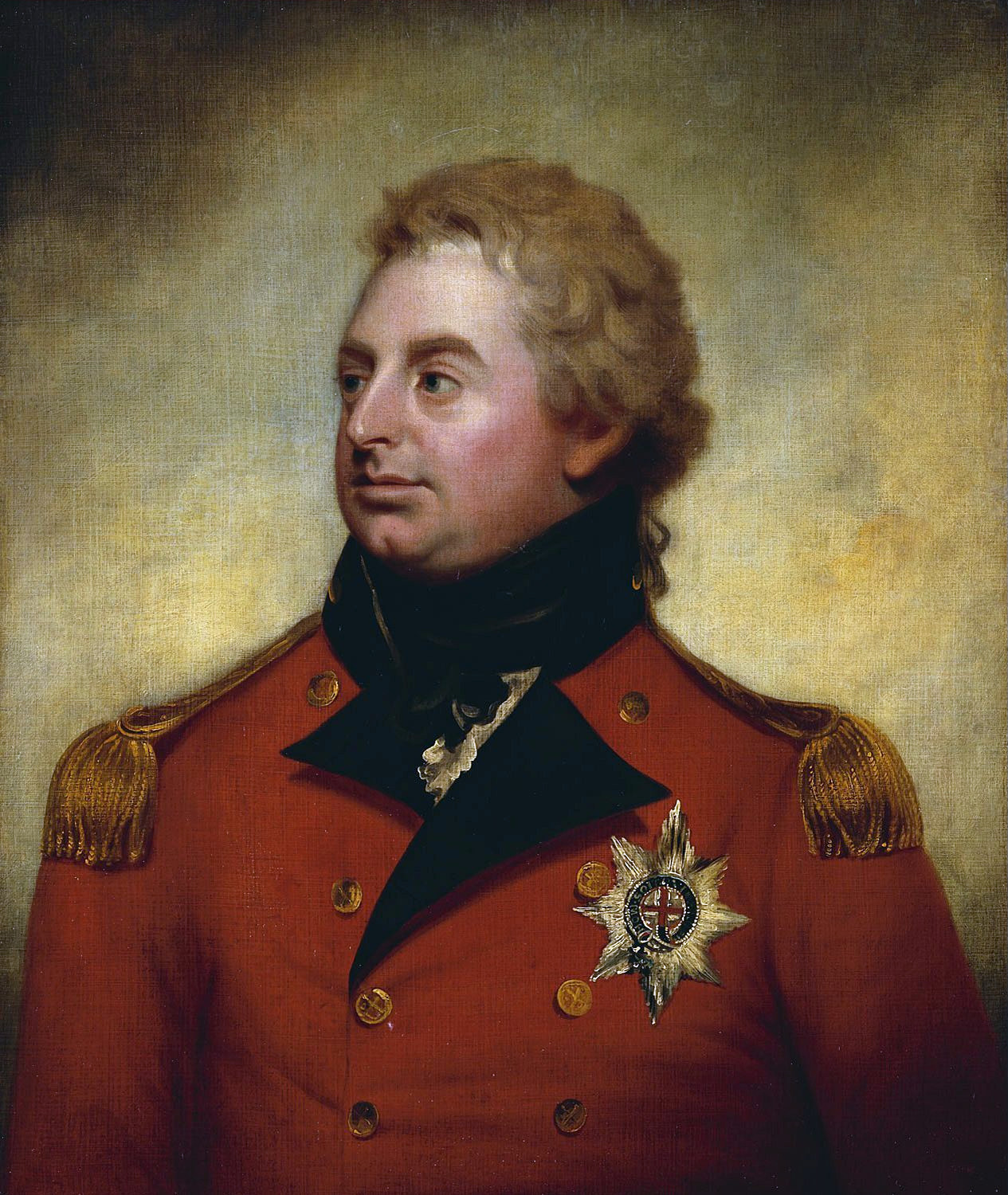
Duke of York

Already, one Prussian and one Austrian battalion had been defeated by the French battery in the woods. The Duke of York arrived on the scene with the British Guards at 5:00 pm. The area was heavily wooded so the duke could not see what was happening. Without telling the British about the presence of the French defenses, Knobelsdorff ordered the 2nd British Guards (Coldstream) battalion into the woods. This would be the debut action of the Guards against Republican France. Lieutenant-Colonel Lowther Pennington commanding the 2nd Guards launched his men into the woods and expelled the French back to their entrenchments. However, pressing on with his men beyond the trees, Pennington then ran into a fierce crossfire of musketry and artillery from the trenches. The duke wrote, "Colonel Pennington without any order whatever chose to attack the battery, and when he came close to it, he received the discharge of three nine Pounders loaded with grape, which mowed down my poor brave fellows most shockingly". "Major Wright, who sent up four guns and was not far off himself, said that he was not surprised at the casualties the Coldstream suffered; they marched through the wood in line and in step!" After suffering over 70 casualties and aware that they were unsupported by the Prussians, the Guards fell back. The presence of red coated infantry persuaded La Marlière that his enemies had been reinforced and he made no further effort to advance.

== Aftermath ==
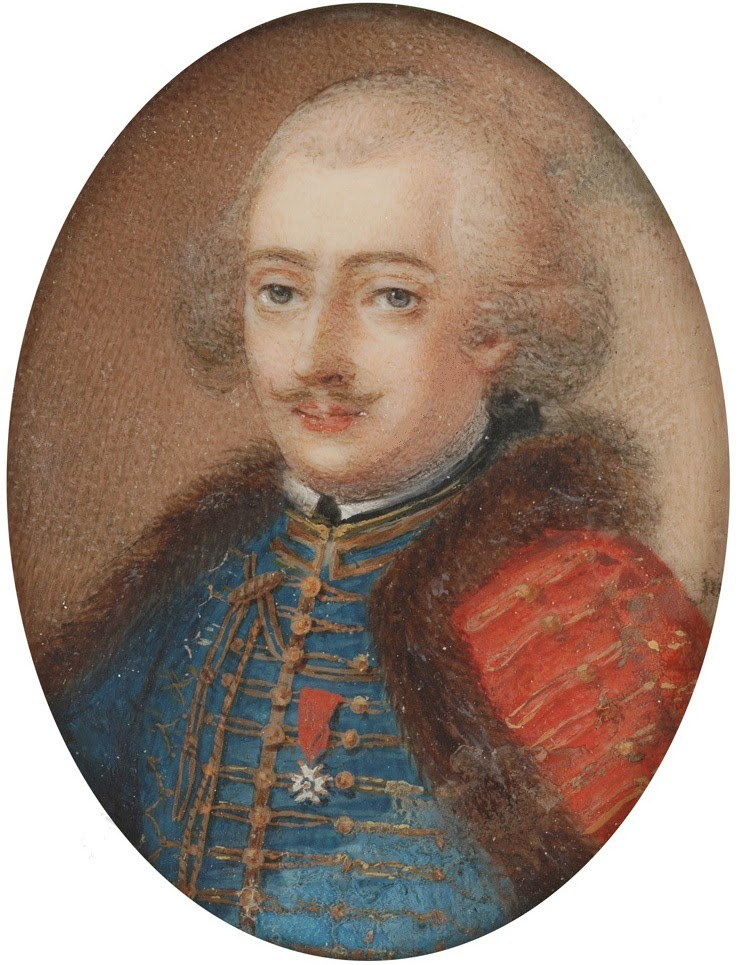
François Lamarche

On 9 May, Clerfayt and Knobelsdorff stormed the new French entrenchments and captured 600 men. The French artillery escaped because the guns were limbered up and withdrawn during the night. Dampierre died of his wounds the same day and was buried in a redoubt at the Camp of Famars. He was succeeded in command of the Army of the North by Lamarche, while Kilmaine took command of the Army of the Ardennes. On 10 May, La Marlière withdrew his troops to Lille and there was no Allied pursuit.

The anonymous "Officer of the Guards" reported French losses as nearly 4,000 killed and wounded, the Austrians 500 and Prussians 300, while the regiment of Coldstream Guards lost 63. Robert Brown reported the total loss of the regiment as 73 killed, wounded and missing. John Fortescue reported combined Austrian and Prussian losses as 800 officers and men for 8–9 May. For the 8 May fighting, Digby Smith listed 600 Allied casualties out of 60,000 troops (not all of whom were engaged) and 1,500 French casualties out of 30,000 engaged.

The heavy British casualties caused friction among the Allies, with both the Duke of York and Knobelsdorff being blamed. Knobelsdorff allegedly failed to warn the British about the French fortifications in the forest, though he should have been aware of them. For his part, York had not considered making such a foolhardy attack, but he made no official complaint. York's chief-of-staff James Pulteney blamed Pennington. The Guards officer had a reputation as a hothead and his conduct at Valenciennes was later described by York as "perfectly mad".

Death probably saved Dampierre from the guillotine. Though praised by his soldiers, after his death he was denounced in Paris as a traitor by Georges Couthon. La Marlière fell under suspicion and was guillotined a few months later. Condé surrendered on 12 July. After the battle, Coburg received reinforcements of a British cavalry brigade and some Hanoverian troops. He began planning the investment of Valenciennes, which resulted in the Battle of Famars.

== Notes ==
Footnotes

Citations
