= Siege of Condé (1793) =

Siege of the War of the First Coalition

Coordinates: 50°27′00″N 3°35′29″E

- Part of the Flanders campaign in the War of the First Coalition
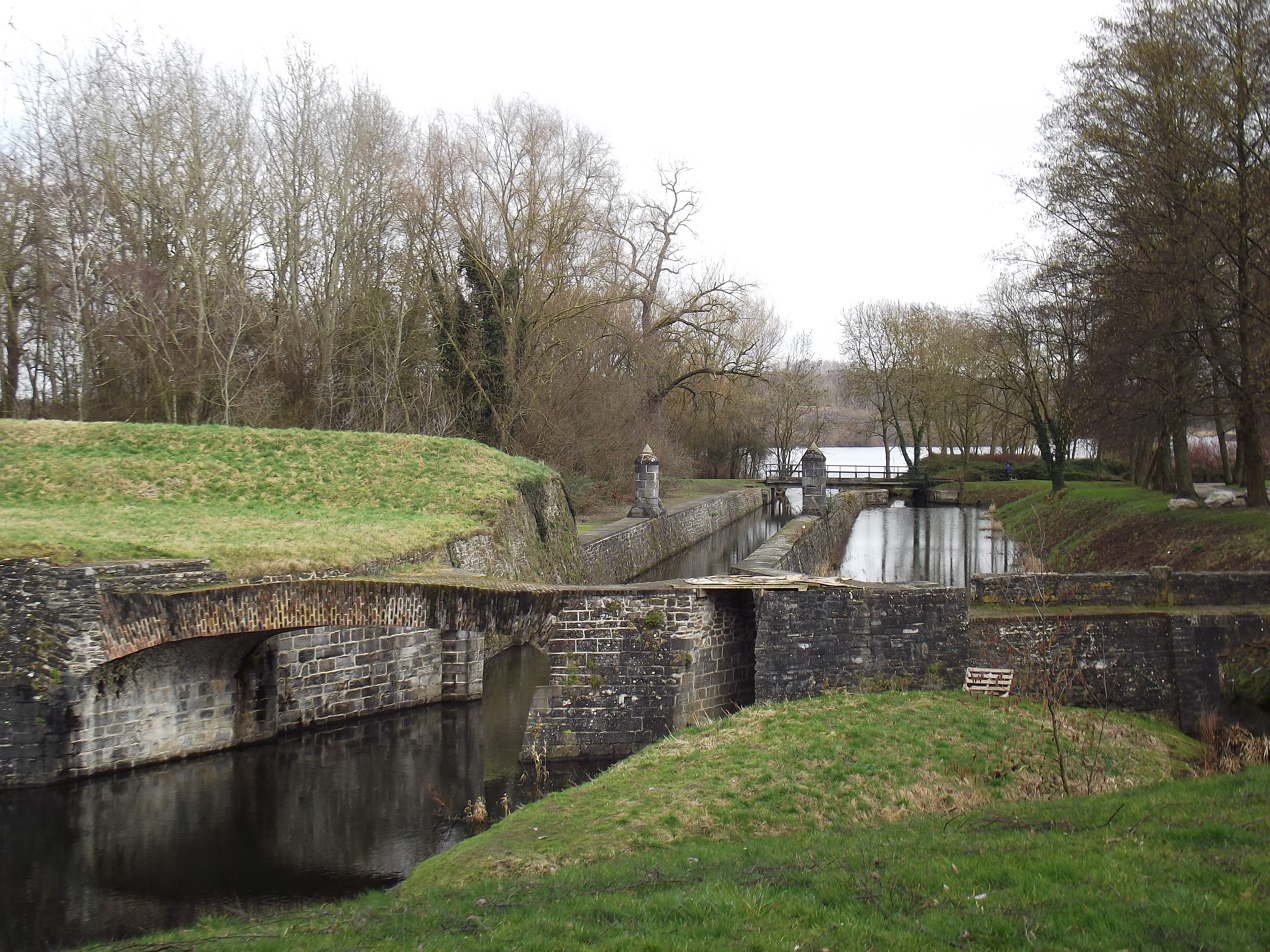
- The defenses of Condé included ditches that could be flooded via sluice gates.
Date	8 April – 12 July 1793
Location	Condé-sur-l'Escaut, France
Result	Coalition victory

Belligerents
(Habsburg monarchy) Habsburg Austria (Kingdom of France) French royalists	Republican France

Commanders and leaders
(Habsburg monarchy) Duke of Württemberg	(France) Jean de Chancel

Strength
6,000	4,300

Casualties and losses
Light	4,300, 103 guns

The siege of Condé (8 April – 12 July 1793) saw a force made up of Habsburg Austrians and French Royalists commanded by Duke Ferdinand Frederick Augustus of Württemberg lay siege to a Republican French garrison led by Jean Nestor de Chancel. After a blockade lasting about three months the French surrendered the fortress. The operation took place during the War of the First Coalition, part of a larger conflict known as the French Revolutionary Wars. Condé-sur-l'Escaut, France is located near the Belgium border about 14 kilometres (9 mi) northeast of Valenciennes.

The Austrian victory at Neerwinden in mid-March drove the French occupation army from the Austrian Netherlands. The subsequent defection of Charles François Dumouriez shook the morale of the French soldiers and caused the politicians to suspect most generals of treason. Austria and her Coalition allies moved against the line of fortresses protecting the northeastern border of France, investing first Condé and Valenciennes soon afterward. Meanwhile, the motley French armies, composed of regulars and raw recruits and led by generals fearful of the guillotine, struggled to defend their nation.

== Background ==
On 18 March 1793, Charles François Dumouriez's French army attacked Prince Josias of Saxe-Coburg-Saalfeld's Austrian army in the Battle of Neerwinden. The French army numbered 40,000 infantry and 4,500 cavalries while the Austrians employed 30,000 foot and 9,000 horse. The fighting on the French right and center was bitterly contested, but the French left collapsed and abandoned the field. After a second defeat near Leuven on 21 March, the French abandoned Brussels on the 24th, their soldiers deserting in large numbers. Dumouriez negotiated with the Austrians and evacuated the Austrian Netherlands in return for free passage for French troops. The French armies took positions behind the frontier. The Army of Holland deployed near Lille, the Army of the Ardennes at Maulde, the Army of the North at Bruille-Saint-Amand, and the Army of Belgium at Condé-sur-l'Escaut and Valenciennes.

Dumouriez was at heart a monarchist and King Louis XVI had been executed on 21 January 1793. He planned to lead the army to Paris and overthrow the National Convention. He negotiated with the Austrians to cooperate by not invading France while her borders were undefended. On 1 April, when the War Minister Pierre de Ruel, marquis de Beurnonville and the government commissioners arrived at his headquarters in Saint-Amand-les-Eaux to demand answers, Dumouriez arrested them and handed them over to the Austrians. The plan quickly unravelled when the plotters failed to seize control of the frontier fortresses. In one incident, Louis-Nicolas Davout's volunteer battalion fired on Dumouriez. While the cavalry and some of the regular infantry might have gone along with the scheme, the artillery and the volunteers, pro-Revolution to the core, refused to follow their general. On 5 April 1793, Dumouriez defected to the Austrians with Duke Louis of Chartres, Jean-Baptiste Cyrus de Valence, and other officers. With the plot in ruins, the Austrians resumed hostilities.

Condé-sur-l'Escaut occupies a strategic location at the confluence of the Scheldt (Escaut) and Haine Rivers. The Romans recognized this when they founded a town at the site. Subsequent residents fortified the location so that by the end of the Middle Ages, Condé was defended by a stone wall with towers surrounded by a moat. The Spanish first tried to modernize the defenses in 1654, but the town was captured by the French general Henri de la Tour d'Auvergne, Vicomte de Turenne the following year. After the French returned Condé by the Treaty of the Pyrenees in 1659, the Spanish converted the town into a fortress. They built a new bastioned trace around the town, outside the old wall which was kept as an inner line. Originally, the new defenses were constructed of earth, but in 1666, the bastions on the west side were revetted with stone. On the south side, a hornwork was built to protect the old town castle. In case of attack, the defenders could easily flood the ditch with water from the rivers. In April 1676 a French army laid siege to the town. Condé was ceded to France by the Treaty of Nijmegen in 1678. Fortifications expert Sébastien Le Prestre de Vauban greatly improved the defenses on the east side, adding two demi-bastions and a full bastion. He also constructed sluice gates so that the garrison could control the depth of the water in the ditches and flood areas on the east side. Outside the fortress, Vauban built five square redoubts in order to keep an attacker away from the main defenses as long as possible. The fortress was undisturbed during the wars of Louis XIV. The engineer Pierre du Buat made some alterations to Condé in the 1770s.

== Siege ==
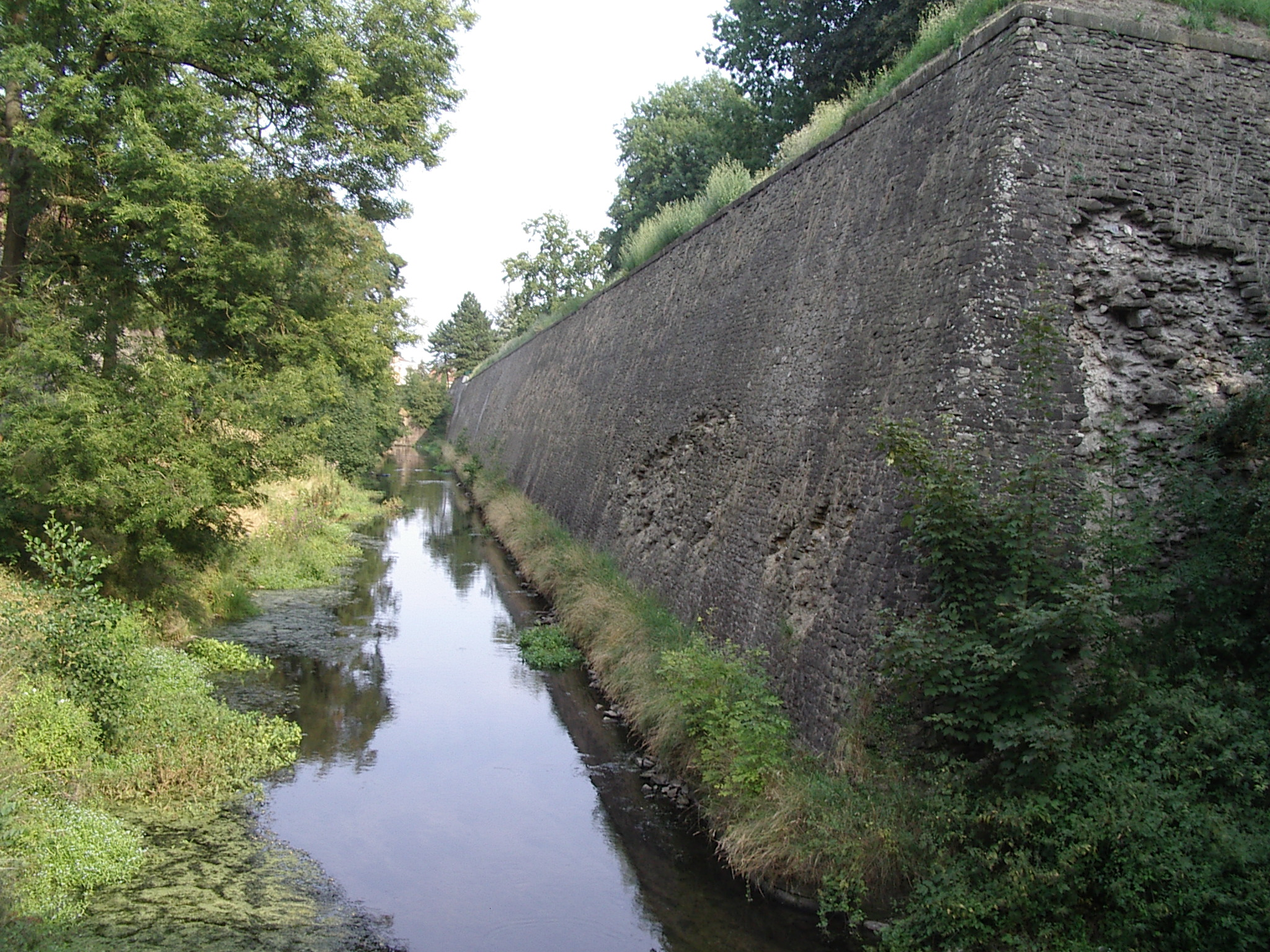
Some of Condé's old defenses still survive.

A 6,000-strong Coalition division led by Duke Ferdinand Frederick Augustus of Württemberg invested Condé-sur-l'Escaut on 8 April 1793. The Austrian portion of Württemberg's force included one battalion each of the Infantry Regiments d'Alton Nr. 15 and Joseph Colloredo Nr. 57, two composite battalions drawn from Infantry Regiments de Ligne Nr. 30, Württemberg Nr. 38, Murray Nr. 55 and Vierset Nr. 58, four companies of Tyrolean Sharpshooters and two squadrons of Kavanagh Cuirassier Regiment Nr. 12. The French Royalist contingent was made up of two squadrons each of the Berczeny Hussar, Saxe Hussar and Royal Allemand Cavalry Regiments. The French garrison was commanded by Maréchal de Camp (General of Brigade) Jean Nestor de Chancel. The 4,300 defending French soldiers were organized into four battalions, four independent companies and eight squadrons.

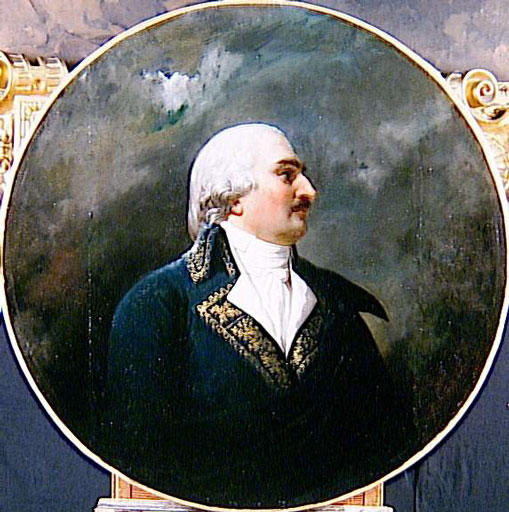
Auguste de Dampierre

After Dumouriez defected, the French government appointed Auguste Marie Henri Picot de Dampierre to replace him in charge of the Army of Belgium on 4 April 1793. There was a reorganization on 24 April in which the Army of Belgium and Army of Holland were suppressed and the remaining troops were consolidated into the Army of the North with Dampierre in command and the subordinate Army of the Ardennes under François Joseph Drouot de Lamarche. Dampierre knew that his troops needed rest but the representatives on mission demanded action. His army reoccupied the Camp of Famars near Valenciennes on 15 April. Two weeks later on 1 May, the French attacked the Coalition army under Prince Josias of Saxe-Coburg-Saalfeld in an attempt to relieve Condé. Though the foot soldiers fought stoutly, the cavalry did not do its duty and the assault failed. On 8 May in the Battle of Raismes, Dampierre attacked again and his left-wing made some progress. The British Guards brigade was committed to the action and drove back the French, but was finally stopped by intense fire. However, the French relief attempt failed. The French suffered 1,500 casualties out of 30,000 involved in the action while the Coalition lost about 600 killed and wounded. Coburg's army numbered about 60,000 including Austrian, Prussian, Dutch and British troops, though many of these were not engaged. Dampierre was carried from the field with part of his thigh shot away; he died the next day. Despite his heroic death, he was denounced as a traitor in the National Convention by Georges Couthon. Had he survived, Dampierre would probably have been sent to the guillotine since he was under suspicion. On 10 May the Coalition forces recaptured all the ground that they lost on the 8th and the French army retired to the Camp of Famars.

On 23 May 1793, the Coalition army defeated the French in the Battle of Famars. The Coalition lost 1,100 casualties out of 53,000 while the 27,000-strong French army, now under Lamarche, lost 3,000 killed and wounded, plus 300 men, 17 guns, 14 ammunition wagons and three colors captured. One consequence of the battle was that the Coalition began the siege of Valenciennes. The isolated garrison at Condé communicated with the French armies via messages sent by balloons. This proved to be a double-edged sword when one balloon fell into the hands of the Coalition along with its message that the defenders were running low on food. Chancel surrendered Condé, its surviving defenders and 103 artillery pieces on 12 July 1793. Coalition losses during the siege are unknown.

== Aftermath ==
Jean Henri Becays Ferrand surrendered Valenciennes to the Coalition on 27 July 1793. At this point the Coalition allies made a deadly blunder. Having seized Condé and Valencienes, they had 118,000 troops concentrated at the gap in the fortress line. Instead, they split their forces. Their next targets were Dunkirk, invested on 24 August, and Le Quesnoy, invested on 28 August. The siege of Le Quesnoy concluded successfully on 13 September but the siege of Dunkirk was a failure.

The loss of Condé spelt the doom of then-current French commander Adam Philippe, Comte de Custine. Though popular in the army, Custine was called to Paris, arrested on 22 July and executed on 27 August 1793. Chancel was promoted to general of division on 11 September 1793 but he ultimately suffered the same fate as Custine. Chancel was second-in-command of the garrison during the siege of Maubeuge. During the Battle of Wattignies, the 20,000-man garrison made an ineffective sortie on 15 October 1793 and was practically inert on the 16th as the battle still raged. After the French victory, Maubeuge was relieved but its defenders failed to pursue the retreating Coalition forces. The blame for the garrison's poor performance was laid on Chancel and he was condemned "with doubtful justice". Chancel died by the guillotine on 6 March 1794.

Condé was held by the Coalition until 29 August 1794 when Franz von Reyniac surrendered the fortress to Barthélemy Louis Joseph Schérer. The 1,500 Austrian defenders were paroled on the promise not to fight against France for one year. These included one battalion each from Infantry Regiments Joseph Colloredo Nr. 57 and Beaulieu Nr. 58, plus three companies from Esterhazy Nr. 34.

== See also ==
- Rickard, J. (2009). "Siege of Condé, April-10 July 1793". historyofwar.org.
