= Wenzel Joseph von Colloredo =

Austrian general

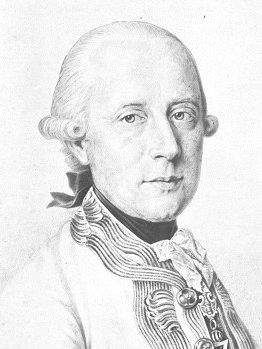
- Wenzel Joseph von Colloredo
- Born: 15 October 1738; Vienna
- Died: 4 September 1822 (aged 83); Vienna
- Relatives: Hieronymus von Colloredo; Joseph Maria von Colloredo; Rudolf Joseph von Colloredo
- Military career
- Allegiance: (Habsburg monarchy) Habsburg Austria; Austrian Empire
- Branch: Infantry
- Service years: c. 1756–1822
- Rank: Field Marshal
- Conflicts: Seven Years' War; Battle of Prague; Battle of Maxen; Battle of Torgau; Austro-Turkish War (1788–1791); War of the First Coalition; Battle of Neerwinden; Battle of Raismes; Battle of Famars; Battle of Caesar's Camp; Siege of Maubeuge
- Awards: Military Order of Maria Theresa; Golden Civil Honor Cross
- Other work: Inhaber Infantry Regiment Nr. 56; Teutonic Order

Wenzel Joseph von Colloredo-Mels und Wallsee (15 October 1738 – 4 September 1822) served in the army of Habsburg Austria from the middle to the end of the 18th century. For the subsequent two decades, he continued to serve the Austrian military in non-combat roles. During the Seven Years' War, he fought at Prague, Maxen, Torgau, and other actions. He held field commands in the Austro-Turkish War. During the War of the First Coalition he led troops at Neerwinden, Raismes, Famars, Caesar's Camp, and Maubeuge. In 1784, he became Proprietor (Inhaber) of an Austrian infantry regiment and held the position until his death. He was promoted Field Marshal in 1808.

== Family ==
Born on 15 October 1738, Wenzel Joseph von Colloredo was the fifth child and fourth son of Rudolph Joseph von Colloredo-Wallsee (1706–1788), a Prince of the Holy Roman Empire, and Marie Gabriele von Starhemberg (1707–1793). His brothers were Franz de Paula Gundackar von Colloredo (1731–1807), Hieronymus von Colloredo (1732–1812), and Joseph Maria von Colloredo (1735–1818). His sisters were Maria Antonie (1728–1757), Marie Gabriele (1741–1801), Marie Therese (1744–1828), Marie Franziska (1746–1795), Marie Caroline (1752–1832). Wenzel Joseph had nine other siblings who died young. Hieronymus became Prince-Archbishop of Salzburg in 1772. Joseph Maria was promoted Field Marshal in 1789. Wenzel Joseph never married.

== Seven Years and Austro-Turkish Wars ==
Colloredo joined the Austrian Carl Colloredo Infantry Regiment Nr. 40 before the Seven Years' War as an ensign and distinguished himself at the Battle of Prague in 1757. He also fought at the Battle of Maxen in 1759 and at the Battle of Torgau in 1760 where the regiment withstood the first Prussian assault. For this exploit, Colloredo was promoted major. After fighting in several more actions, he was appointed Oberstleutnant (lieutenant colonel) of the Waldeck Infantry Regiment Nr. 35 on 1 April 1762. He replaced his brother Joseph as Oberst (colonel) of the Lacy Infantry Regiment Nr. 22 on 8 February 1764 and remained the regiment's commander until 1770 when Anton Mittrowsky assumed leadership. Colloredo became a knight of the Teutonic Order in 1764. He earned promotion to Generalmajor on 1 May 1773 and to Feldmarschall-Leutnant on 10 April 1783.

Colloredo was appointed inhaber (proprietor) of Infantry Regiment Nr. 56 in 1784. He succeeded the previous inhaber, Jacob Nugent who held the position since 1767. From May 1784 to August 1786 he was commanding general in Slavonia and Syrmia. At the beginning of the Austro-Turkish War, he commanded a body of troops on the Almaș River. In 1789–1790, he led an observation corps in Galicia. In June 1789, he commanded a division in Field Marshal András Hadik's main army. It consisted of 6,895 infantry and 2,350 cavalry. Colloredo was promoted Feldzeugmeister on 26 December 1789. He was commander of Inner Austria and the Tyrol from September 1790 to March 1797.

== War of the First Coalition ==
After the French Republican army overran the Austrian Netherlands, a 40,000-man Allied army under Prince Josias of Saxe-Coburg-Saalfeld was assembled to reconquer the province. At the Battle of Neerwinden on 18 March 1793, Coburg with 30,000 infantry and 9,000 cavalry faced Charles François Dumouriez with 40,000 infantry and 4,500 cavalry. The French were beaten and withdrew behind the French border. At Neerwinden, Colloredo commanded the Second Rank of the Main Body, a force of 6 battalions and 10 squadrons. There were two battalions each of Infantry Regiments Brechainville Nr. 25 and Callenberg Nr. 54 and one battalion each of Infantry Regiments Alton Nr. 15 and Joseph Colloredo Nr. 57. The mounted troops consisted of 6 squadrons of Zeschwitz Cuirassier Regiment Nr. 10, and two squadrons each of Karaczay Chevau-léger Regiment Nr. 18 and Coburg Dragoon Regiment Nr. 37.

Colloredo was named Reichs-General of the Cavalry for the Holy Roman Empire on 8 April 1793. In an action preliminary to the Battle of Raismes on 1 May 1793, the French attacked the Coalition army covering the Siege of Condé. One French column under François Joseph Drouot de Lamarche set out from Curgies. When the French soldiers encountered Austrian cavalry led by Colloredo, they panicked and fled. Colloredo pursued them until they withdrew into their fortified camp. Colloredo was not involved in the 8 May fighting.

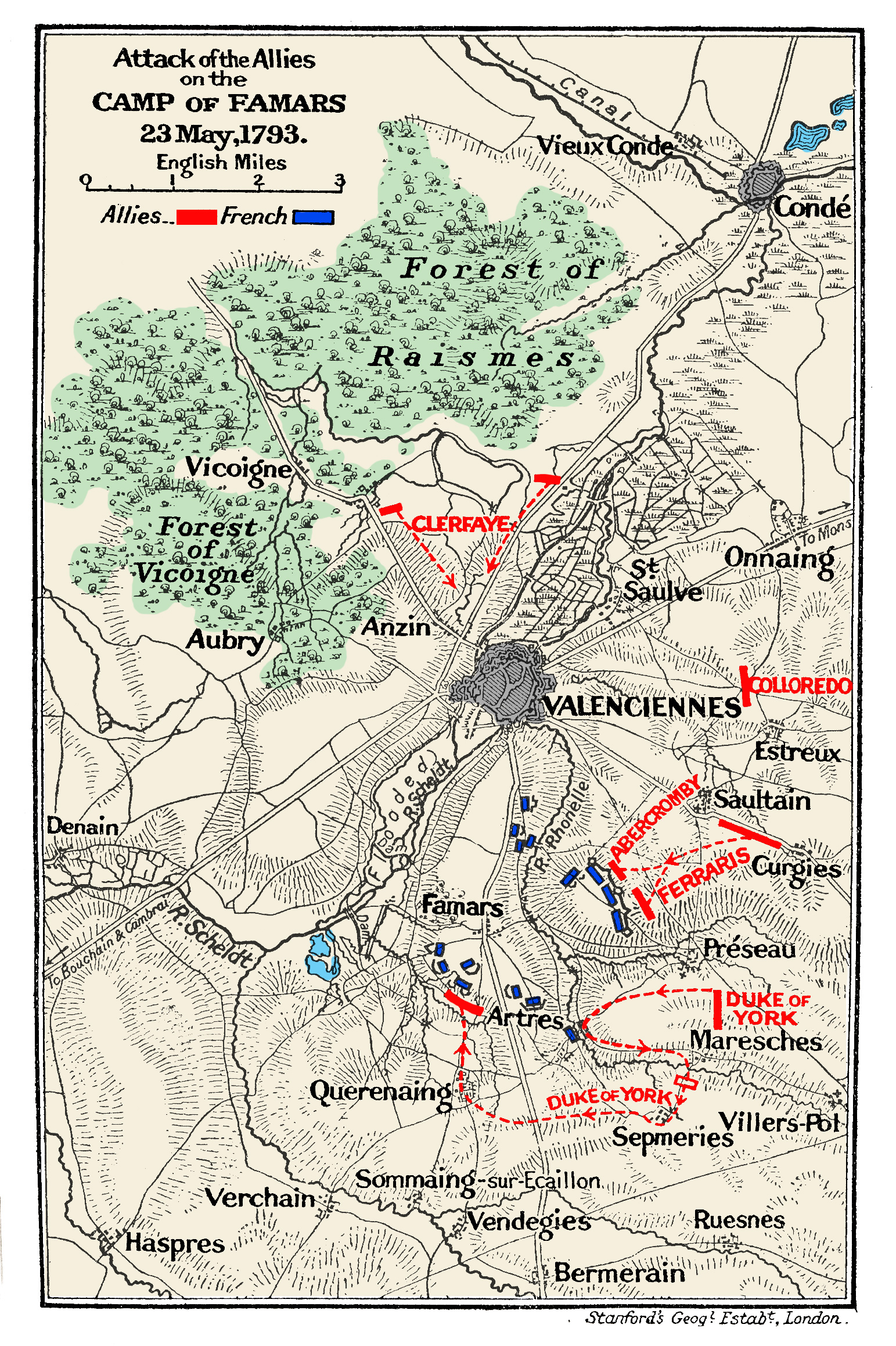
Battle of Famars map shows Colloredo to the right of Valenciennes.

In the Battle of Famars on 23 May, Coburg attacked the French army with two main columns and seven lesser columns. He sent 16 battalions, 18 squadrons, and 38 position guns under Frederick, Duke of York and Albany in a wide sweep around the French right flank and 12 battalions, 12 squadrons, and 23 position guns under Joseph de Ferraris on a narrower sweep. Colloredo led a column that covered Ferraris' right flank. Colloredo's force was named the First Small Column and included one battalion each of the Austrian Infantry Regiments Beaulieu Nr. 31, Splenyi Nr. 51, and Wenzel Colloredo Nr. 56, two squadrons of the Esterhazy Hussar Regiment Nr. 32. Colloredo's Hanoverian contingent consisted of two battalions of the 5th Infantry Regiment, and two squadrons each of the 5th and 7th Cavalry Regiments. He also commanded two 12-pounder position guns. Ferraris' assault overran part of the French defenses, but York's column did not reach an attacking position until nightfall, so its assault was called off. During the night, the French withdrew from the Camp of Famars. The lesser columns were mostly unsuccessful. On 28 May, Colloredo was awarded the Commander's Cross of the Military Order of Maria Theresa.

After their capture of Condé on 10 July and the successful conclusion of the Siege of Valenciennes on 28 July, the Coalition leaders decided to engage the French army in a general action. The French army, now under Charles Edward Jennings de Kilmaine, faced eastward in an entrenched position called Caesar's Camp between Cambrai and Bouchain on the Scheldt River. The northern and western flanks were protected by rivers while the southern flank was covered by the Bourlon ridge. Kilmaine had 35,000 French troops to defend the position. Coburg sent two columns with a combined strength of 16,000 men under François Sébastien Charles Joseph de Croix, Count of Clerfayt and Colloredo to start from Hérin and attack the French defenses along the Scheldt. Meanwhile, Coburg ordered York and 25,000 troops to start from Villers-en-Cauchies and make a wide sweep to the south of Cambrai to strike the French right rear. The Battle of Caesar's Camp on 8 August ended when Kilmaine saw the danger of being trapped and withdrew west toward Arras and Douai. At Caesar's Camp, Colloredo's command included two divisions. Ludwig von Terzi's division was made up of two battalions each of Infantry Regiments Stein Nr. 50, Murray Nr. 55, Joseph Colloredo Nr. 57, and Jordis Nr. 59. Karl von Lilien's division consisted of six squadrons each of the Coburg Dragoon Regiment Nr. 37, Nassau Cuirassier Regiment Nr. 14, and Barco Hussar Regiment Nr. 35, one battalion of Sharpshooters, and two squadrons of the French Émigré Royal Allemande Regiment.

During the Siege of Maubeuge, Colloredo commanded the 16 battalions, 10 companies, and 8 squadrons, altogether 14,000 Imperial troops, that invested the city on the south bank of the Sambre River. William V, Prince of Orange commanded 12,000 Dutch troops on the north bank. The covering army under Clerfayt numbered 37,000 men, but Coburg spread his forces so wide, that Clerfayt had only 21,000 to meet the attack of Jean-Baptiste Jourdan's 45,000 French soldiers. The Allied cause was not helped when Orange refused to allow any Dutch soldiers to cross to the south bank. After heavy fighting in the Battle of Wattignies on 15–16 October, Coburg abandoned the siege and withdrew the Coalition army.

== Later career ==
Colloredo became deputy to the commanding general in Moravia and Silesia in 1797–1798. He was appointed Inspector General of the Military Border in November 1798. He held the position until March 1802 when he was selected to be a captain of the Trabanten Life Guard. He served in the Hofkriegsrat from August 1806 to April 1810 and from November 1813 to June 1814. In December 1814, Colloredo was promoted Field Marshal on 6 September 1808. He was again appointed captain of the Trabanten Life Guard from December 1814 until his death. In 1805–1806, he was province commander of the Koblenz bailiwick in the Teutonic Order. He was awarded the Golden Civil Honor Cross on 26 May 1815. Colloredo died at Vienna on 4 September 1822. Carl von Fürstenwerther was appointed the next inhaber of Infantry Regiment Nr. 56 in 1825.

== Notes ==
Military offices
Preceded by Joseph Colloredo	Oberst (colonel) of Infantry Regiment Nr. 22; 1764–1770	Succeeded by Anton Mittrowsky
Preceded by Jacob Nugent	Proprietor (Inhaber) of Infantry Regiment Nr. 56; 1784–1822	Succeeded by Carl von Fürstenwerther
