= Joseph Maria von Colloredo =

Austrian general

- Born: 11 September 1735; Regensburg
- Died: 26 November 1818 (aged 83); Vienna
- Military career
- Allegiance: Habsburg Austria; Austrian Empire
- Branch: Infantry
- Service years: c. 1760–1818
- Rank: Field Marshal
- Conflicts: French Revolutionary Wars
- Awards: Military Order of Maria Theresa, (refused)
- Other work: Inhaber Infantry Regiment Nr. 57

Joseph Maria von Colloredo-Mels und Wallsee (11 September 1735 – 26 November 1818) served in the army of Habsburg Austria during the French Revolutionary Wars. He was distinguished in action during the Seven Years' War. He commanded the artillery at the 1789 Siege of Belgrade and was promoted Field Marshal for his services. He led a major reform of the Austrian army's artillery and became a member of the Hofkriegsrat. In 1769, he became Proprietor (Inhaber) of an Austrian infantry regiment and held the position until his death.

== Family ==
Joseph Maria was the fourth child and third son of Rudolph Joseph von Colloredo zu Wallsee zu Mels (1706–1788) and Marie Gabriele von Starhemberg (1707–1793). His brothers were Franz de Paula Gundackar von Colloredo (1731–1807), Hieronymus von Colloredo (1732–1812), and Wenzel Joseph von Colloredo (1738–1822).
His sisters were Maria Antonie (1728–1757), Marie Gabriele (1741–1801), Marie Therese (1744–1828), Marie Franziska (1746–1795), Marie Caroline (1752–1832). Joseph had nine other siblings who died young. Hieronymus became Prince-Archbishop of Salzburg in 1772 and became a patron of Mozart. Wenzel Joseph was promoted Field Marshal in 1808. Joseph Maria never married.

== Career ==
Colloredo was appointed inhaber (proprietor) of Infantry Regiment Nr. 57 in 1769. He succeeded the previous inhaber, Joseph von Andlau who held the position since 1745. Friedrich von Minutillo was appointed the next inhaber of the regiment in 1823.

== Notes ==
Military offices
Preceded by Joseph von Andlau	Proprietor (Inhaber) of Infantry Regiment Nr. 57; 1769–1818	Succeeded by Friedrich von Minutillo
