= Battle of Famars =

1793 battle of the Flanders Campaign, during the War of the First Coalition

- Part of the Flanders campaign in the War of the First Coalition
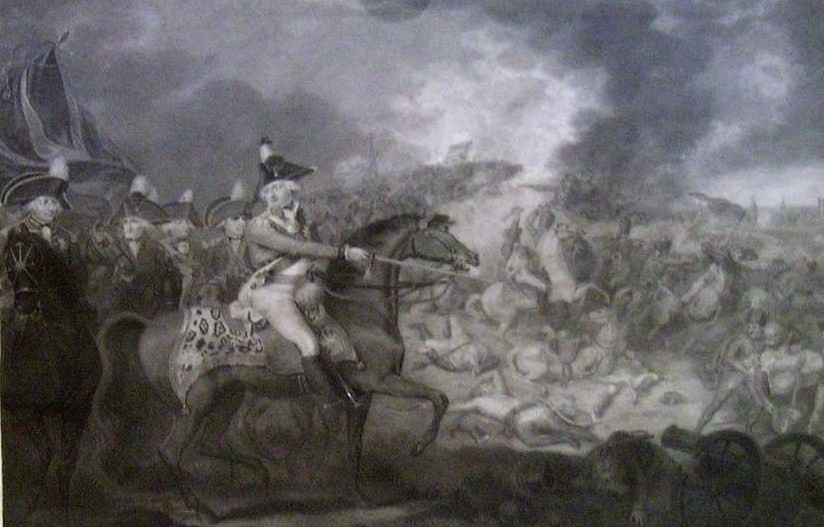
- Battle of Famars
Date	23 May 1793
Location	Famars, Nord, France 50.3161°N 3.5200°E
Result	Coalition victory

Belligerents
(France) First French Republic	Austria (Province of Hanover) Hanover; Great Britain

Commanders and leaders
(France) François Lamarche	(Habsburg monarchy) Prince of Coburg (Habsburg monarchy) Joseph de Ferraris (Kingdom of Great Britain) Duke of York (Habsburg monarchy) Merveldt

Strength
27,000	53,000

Casualties and losses
3,000 killed or wounded, 300 captured, 17 cannons lost, 14 ammunition wagons, 3 standards lost	c. 1,100 killed or wounded
- Location within Europe

The Battle of Famars was fought on 23 May 1793 during the Flanders Campaign of the War of the First Coalition. An Allied Austrian, Hanoverian, and British army under Prince Josias of Saxe-Coburg-Saalfeld defeated the French Army of the North led by François Joseph Drouot de Lamarche. The battle occurred near the village of Famars in northern France, five km south of Valenciennes.

== Background ==
In May 1793, following a series of reverses the French Republican army in the Low Countries was in a desperate situation. Dispirited after the death of its former commander Augustin-Marie Picot de Dampierre, it was tired and disorganised. In addition it was further weakened by detachments taken from each battalion to serve in the War in the Vendée. Although new recruits were being allocated from the levy of 300,000, many of these deserted or were otherwise unfit for service. The new temporary commander Lamarche realised that all that could be done for the moment was to draw back to an entrenched camp at Famars and the fortress of Valenciennes.

The allies under Coburg moved to besiege Valenciennes, but first they desired to drive Lamarche from Famars to clear the way and prevent any intervention from the French. Coburg's forces had recently been augmented by the newly arrived Anglo-Hanoverian contingent commanded by the 26-year-old Frederick, Duke of York; it was decided they would spearhead the main attack. This is perhaps surprising, as for many of the British troops it would be their first taste of action against Republican France.

The camp at Famars lay on a ridge, three miles south of Valenciennes, and was bordered on the east by the river Rhonelle, the bridges and fords of which had been destroyed. An attack was drawn up by Austrian staff planner Karl Mack von Leiberich, and was to consist of direct assaults on the eastern side of the camp by two main columns, supported by holding attacks on both flanks from two smaller corps. On the other side of the Scheldt Clerfayt was to launch a consecutive attack against the entrenched camp at Mont Anzin.

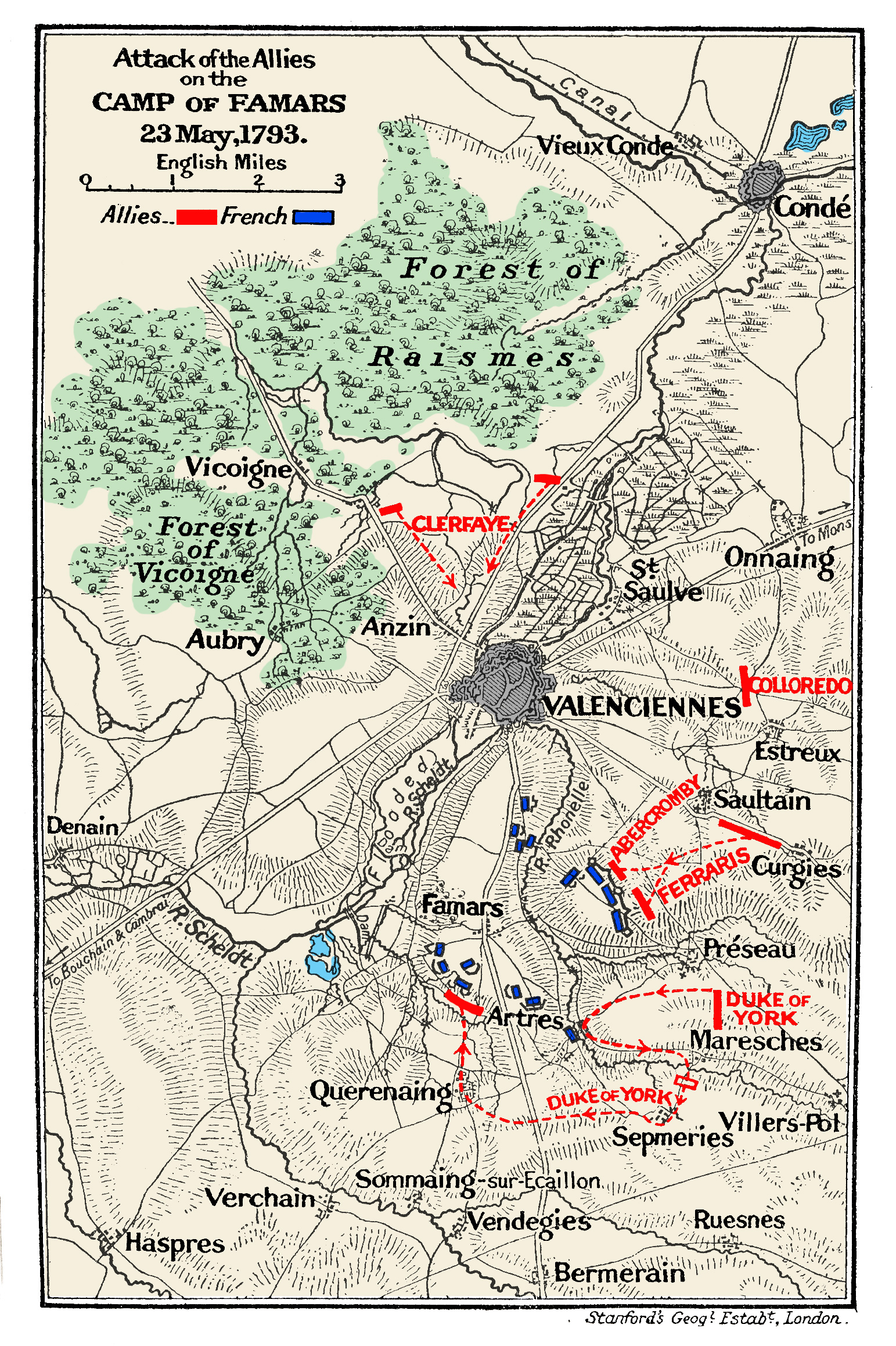
The Battle of Famars

== Battle ==
The 1st Main Column of 16 battalions and 18 squadrons was led by the Duke of York and included the British Guards brigade under Gerard Lake, which had already seen action at Raismes on 8 May. Mack's instructions were for York to cross the Rhonelle by trestle bridges in the neighbourhood of Artres and then launch an attack on the camp by its right flank. In other words, no resistance was expected until the attack on the French camp.

Austrian Feldzeugmeister Joseph de Ferraris commanded the 2nd Main Column (12 battalions, 12 squadrons), which included Abercromby's Brigade of the British 14th Foot and 53rd Foot. It was to attack from the village of Saultain against entrenchments on the East bank of the Rhonelle. Feldzeugmeister Wenzel Joseph von Colloredo led the 1st Small Column against the Northeastern side of Valenciennes, while General-Major Rudolf Ritter von Otto directed the 2nd Small Column, threatening Le Quesnoy.

Soon after 2:00 am York's column moved off from its assembly point two miles behind Artres, but thick fog slowed their progress and the Rhonelle was only reached at 7.00am. York was accompanied by both Mack and Coburg's Chief-of-Staff Hohenlohe, the latter appointed by Coburg to ensure the untested York didn't do anything too rash. As the fog lifted a beautiful dawn revealed their intended crossing point bristling with enemy infantry and artillery, which immediately opened fire. Mack was wounded right at the beginning of the action, so the untried Duke of York was left to make up his own mind as to his next course of action. His decision was to turn and counter-march his column towards Maresches two miles away to the south-east, leaving some Austrian guns and the troops already engaged behind to focus the attention of the French. Fording the stream there unopposed, York's light cavalry ascended the low ridge to the south of the village to probe the French flank towards Querenaing. Unfortunately there were several delays and congestion at Maresches so it was 3.00 pm before he was clear of the village, giving the French ample time to turn and face the threat, and 5.00 pm before he reached Querenaing by a somewhat roundabout route. However the British cavalry moved behind the unprotected backs of the southern French open redoubts, their left patrol reaching almost as far as the Abbey of Fontanelle to the rear of the French position. The Allied cavalry had some success when they entered the open redoubts via gorges and cut down the defenders. The French cavalry attempted to retake the redoubts but were beaten off.

Meanwhile, further north Ferraris's column had stormed the long entrenchment on the east bank ridge of the Famars position and driven the French back to the west of the Rhonelle. Earlier in the day several squadrons of French cavalry had been seen threatening his flank, whereby they were charged by the Hanoverian Life Guards and routed after a stiff fight.

Finally York was ready to launch his attack, but at that point the cautious Hohenlohe stepped in and objected as the men were fatigued, York was obliged to postpone the assault until the next morning.

Although the French held their ground to the north Lamarche realised he was in danger of being cut off. Leaving Ferrand to defend Valenciennes, during the night the Republicans withdrew towards Bouchain, Caesar's Camp and Paillencourt. The next morning York attacked, but the French had gone. Colloredo's column from the north were the first to enter the camp.

== Aftermath ==
Clerfayt had also been successful in his attack, although experiencing tougher resistance at Mont Anzin.

Of 27,000 men engaged, the French lost on all fields 3,000 killed and wounded. The Allies captured 300 soldiers, 17 artillery pieces, 14 ammunition wagons, and three colours. Allied casualties totalled 1,100, mostly Austrians, out of 53,000 troops available. Mack was amongst the wounded. Hanoverian losses were 22 killed and 61 wounded.

Having neutralised Famars Camp, Coburg was now free to open the Siege of Valenciennes. Once again York was given the lead role in command of the siege, supported by Ferraris.

On 27 May, Lamarche was replaced in command by Adam Philippe, Comte de Custine.

During the battle, the 14th Regiment of Foot, The West Yorkshire Regiment, attacked the French to the music of Ça Ira. The regiment was later awarded the tune as a battle honour and regimental quick march.

== Assessment ==
The Austrian command blamed the Duke of York for the failure to catch Lamarche, but this is challenged by British historians like Alfred Burne. "A commander who... is plagued with a rigid mind will plunge straight ahead into a sea of difficulties merely because this course has been preordained for him. But flexibility is one of the valid principles of war, and one of the cardinal virtues of the general...The Duke of York is thus to be applauded rather than condemned for scrapping the first plan he was given and substituting another"

== Footnotes ==
Preceded by Battle of Neerwinden (1793)	French Revolution: Revolutionary campaigns Battle of Famars	Succeeded by French expedition to Sardinia
