= Alexander von Knobelsdorff =

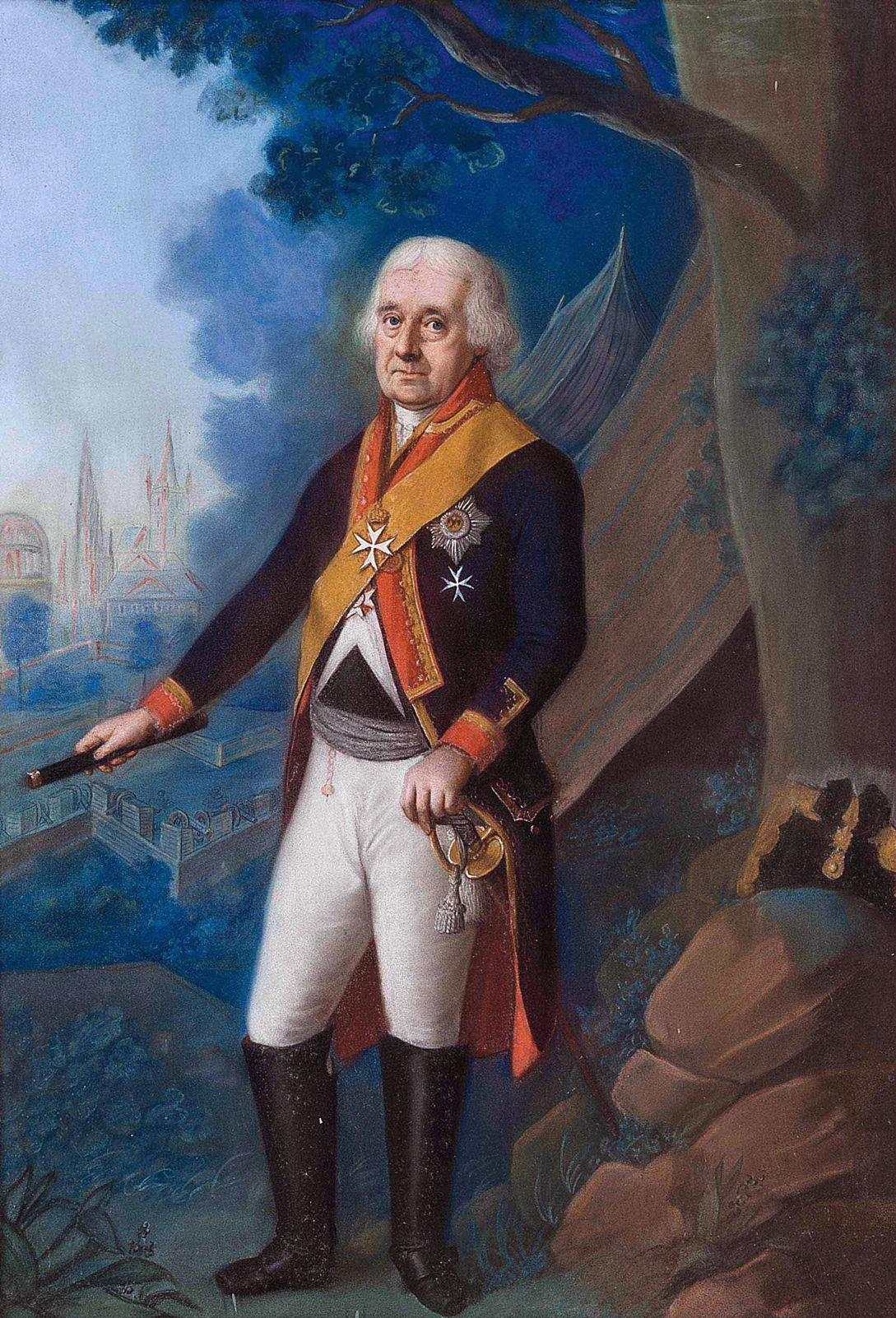
Field Marshal Alexander Friedrich von Knobelsdorff

Alexander Friedrich von Knobelsdorff (13 May 1723 in Cunow near Crossen – 10 December 1799 in Stendal) was a Prussian field marshal.

== Biography ==
Knobelsdorff, originally a cavalry officer, had received awards in the Silesian Wars and was commander of the infantry regiments "Brunswick-Bevern" and "von Schwarz". In 1776 he was made Inhaber of the infantry regiment "Stojentin", stationed in Stendal. During the War of the Bavarian Succession he distinguished himself as brigade commander in the army of Prince Henry. In the campaign against Holland in 1787, he led the division on the left wing. The army commander at that time was Ferdinand, Duke of Brunswick. At the outbreak of war against France in 1792, he remained in Stendal, while his regiment joined the corps of the Duke of Brunswick. However, when the war situation worsened and the Duke fell ill and had to leave the coalition forces in March 1793; Knobelsdorff took over as supreme commander of the Prussian troops. In the summer of 1793 Knobelsdorff was promoted to General of the Infantry and received special praise by the king. A frequent guest of the later, the old general was promoted to Generalfeldmarschall in 1798 and still participated in maneuvers at Potsdam in 1799.

Knobelsdorff died in Stendal in December of that year after suffering a stroke. He had been a freemason and for many years served as Worshipful Master of Stendal's lodge "The Golden Crown". He had been a known hunter and nature lover, having frequently used the Stendal Letzlinger Heath for hiking and hunting trips. One of his most famous pupils is General Ernst von Rüchel, inspector general of the Prussian military education and Mitverlierer of the Battle of Jena on 14 October 1806.

Knobelsdorff became inhaber (proprietor) of Infantry Regiment No. 27 in 1776 and held the position until he died. The regiment's previous inhaber was Peter Heinrich von Stojentin. The subsequent inhaber of Regiment No. 27 was Friedrich Wilhelm Alexander von Tschammer und Osten.

== Notes ==
Military offices
Preceded by Peter Heinrich von Stojentin	Proprietor (Inhaber) of Infantry Regiment Nr. 27; 1776–1799	Succeeded by Friedrich Wilhelm Alexander von Tschammer
