= Famars =

- Commune
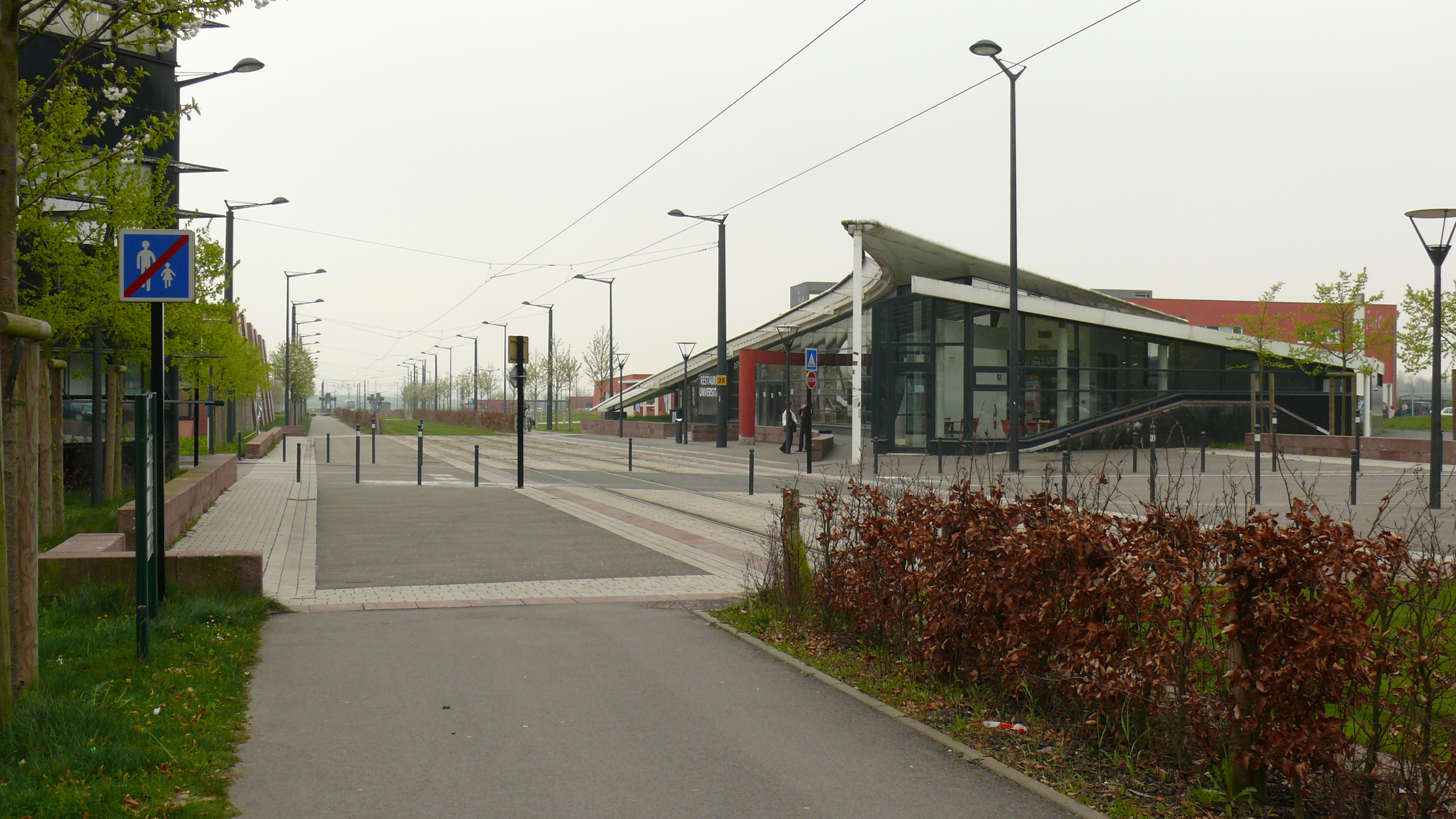
- The tramway in Famars

- Coat of arms
- Location of Famars
- Location within France Location within Hauts-de-France
- Coordinates: 50°19′N 3°31′E
- Country: France
- Region: Hauts-de-France
- Department: Nord
- Arrondissement: Valenciennes
- Canton: Aulnoy-lez-Valenciennes
- Intercommunality: CA Valenciennes Métropole

Government
  - Mayor (2020–2026): Véronique Dupire
- Area^{1}: 4.73 km^{2} (1.83 sq mi)
- Elevation: 72 m (236 ft)
- Highest elevation: 87 m (285 ft)
- Lowest elevation: 36 m (118 ft)
- Population (2023): 2,474
  - Density: 523/km^{2} (1,350/sq mi)
- Time zone: UTC+01:00 (CET)
  - Summer (DST): UTC+02:00 (CEST)
- INSEE/Postal code: 59221 /59300
- ^{1} French Land Register data, which excludes lakes, ponds, glaciers > 1 km^{2} (0.386 sq mi or 247 acres) and river estuaries.

Famars (French pronunciation: [famaʁs]) is a commune in the Nord department in northern France.

== Population ==
Historical population
Year	Pop.	±% p.a.
1968	1,132	—
1975	1,567	+4.75%
1982	1,444	−1.16%
1990	2,002	+4.17%
1999	2,499	+2.49%
2007	2,495	−0.02%
2012	2,475	−0.16%
2017	2,517	+0.34%
2023	2,474	−0.29%
Source: INSEE

== Heraldry ==
Arms of Famars	The arms of Famars are blazoned : Sable billetty, a lion Or, armed, langued and crowned argent.

== See also ==
- Communes of the Nord department
- Battle of Famars (1793)
