= Army of the Ardennes =

French Revolutionary Army (1792–1794)

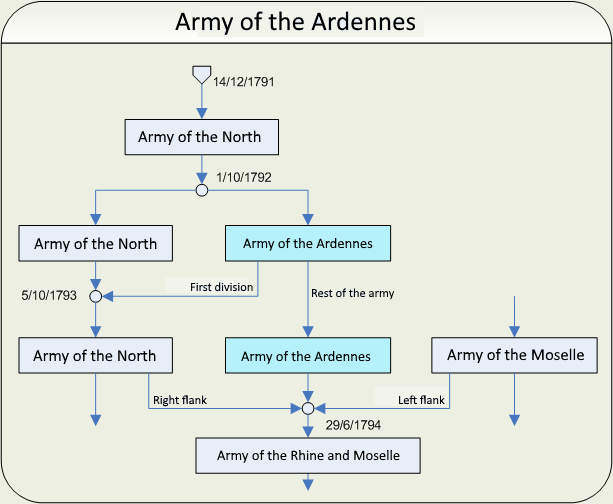

The Army of the Ardennes (armée des Ardennes) was a French Revolutionary Army formed on the first of October 1792 by splitting off the right wing of the Army of the North, commanded from July to August that year by La Fayette. From July to September 1792 General Dumouriez also misused the name Army of the Ardennes for the right wing of what was left of the Army of the North after the split, encamped at Sedan and the name of Army of the North for the left flank of the army.

It was reorganized by a decree of the Conseil exécutif on the first of March 1793, leading to only the right flank of the army keeping the name of Army of the Ardennes. The first division of the Army of the Ardennes re-merged back into the Army of the North on 5 October 1793, at which date the rest of the Army of the Ardennes continued as the Army of the Ardennes until 29 June 1794, when it merged with the Army of the North's right wing and the Army of the Moselle's left wing to form the Army of Sambre-et-Meuse.

== Command of the army ==
After the command of La Fayette (July–August 1792), Dumouriez leads the whole army from 1 October 1792 to 4 April 1793, but he is replaced by Lanoue and Leveneur, both under the command of Miranda, from 12 January to 22 February. Then by Valence.

On 5 April 1793, Dumouriez defects and is replaced by Dampierre which is himself replaced by Lamarche on 29 April 1793. Lamarche will remain in command until 28 July 1793, but will be subordinated to Dampierre from 29 April to 7 May, then independent from the 8th to 27 May, subordinated again under Custine from 28 May to 16 July, and finally under Kilmaine from the 17th to 28 July. Kilmaine then replaces Lamarche and is in command of the army from 29 July to 10 August 1793, and is replaced by Houchard. Houchard is in command from 11 August to 12 September 1793, and is replaced on 13 September by Jourdan. Jourdan will then command directly the army until 4 November, Jacques Ferrand will then subordinately command the army for Jourdan until 4 December, he is replaced by Sistrières.

Sistrières will then be subordinated to the Head General of the Army of the North, Charbonnier, from 4 February to 2 June 1794. He is finally replaced by Jourdan, now subordinated to Pichegru, until the army ceased to exist due to its fusion with the Army of Moselle and the Army of the North.

=== Left flank command ===
The left flank of the army is under the command of Général Beurnonville from the 13th to 20 October 1792, and by Général Lanoue from 12 January to 22 February 1793, under the name of Army of Belgium.

=== Right flank command ===
The right flank of the army in 1792 is successively under the command of Général Kellermann from 6 to 24 October, and by Général Valence, subordinated to Dumouriez, from 25 October to 29 December. It will be commanded by Général Leveneur from 12 January to 22 February, before becoming the only part of the army under the name of Army of the Ardennes by decree on 1 March 1793.

== Composition in 1793 ==
The composition of the Army of the Ardennes in January 1793 was:

- Commanding General, Jean-Baptiste de Thiembronne, Comte de Valence
- Left Advance Guard, in Neuilly-sur-Suize
  - 47éme Régiment d'Infanterie de Ligne (Lorraine) (1 Company)
  - 5e Compagnie de Chasseurs à Pied (National Guard)
  - Detachment from Bataillon de la Commune de Paris (National Guard)
  - 1st Brigade
    - 2éme Régiment de Dragons (Condé)
    - Bataillon de Grenadiers Nationaux (National Guard)
    - 1er Bataillon de la Charente-Inferieure (National Guard)
  - 2nd Brigade
    - 10éme Régiment de Dragons (Mestre de Camp Général)
    - 1er Bataillon du 73éme Régiment d'Infanterie de Ligne (Royal–Comtois)
    - 1er Bataillon de Cher-et-Loire (National Guard)
    - Bataillon de la Commune de Paris (National Guard)
- 1st Division, commanded by Lieutenant Général Alexis Le Veneur de Tillières
  - 7éme Régiment de Hussards (Lamothe)
  - 23éme Régiment de Cavalerie (Royal–Guyenne)
  - 75 troops in the Artillery Park
  - 1st Brigade
    - 1er Bataillon du 17éme Régiment d'Infanterie de Ligne (Auvergne)
    - 1er Bataillon du 25éme Régiment d'Infanterie de Ligne (Poitou)
    - 1er Bataillon de la Mayenne (National Guard)
    - 2éme Bataillon de Saône-et-Loire (National Guard)
  - 2nd Brigade
    - 1er Bataillon du 38éme Régiment d'Infanterie de Ligne (Dauphiné)
    - 1er Bataillon du 43éme Régiment d'Infanterie de Ligne (Royal des Vaisseaux)
    - 1er Bataillon de la Sarthe (National Guard)
    - 5éme Bataillon des Vosges (National Guard)
- 2nd Division, commanded by Lieutenant Général Diettmann
  - 16éme Régiment de Cavalerie (Royal–Lorraine)
  - 18éme Régiment de Cavalerie (Berry)
  - 21éme Régiment de Cavalerie (Royal–Picardie)
  - 75 troops in the Artillery Park
  - 3rd Brigade
    - 1er Bataillon du 45éme Régiment d'Infanterie de Ligne (La Couronne)
    - 1er Bataillon du 47éme Régiment d'Infanterie de Ligne (Lorraine)
    - 1er Bataillon de la Haute-Vienne (National Guard)
    - 2éme Bataillon de la Meurthe (National Guard)
  - 4th Brigade
    - 1er Bataillon du 56éme Régiment d'Infanterie de Ligne (Bourbon)
    - 1er Bataillon du 58éme Régiment d'Infanterie de Ligne (Rouergue)
    - 2éme Bataillon des Ardennes (National Guard)
    - 3éme Bataillon de la Meurthe (National Guard)
- Right Advance Guard, in Lamarche
  - 1st Brigade
    - 9éme Bataillon de Chasseurs (Cévennes)
    - 5éme Bataillon de Paris (National Guard)
    - 10éme Bataillon de Paris (National Guard)
    - Chasseurs de Golbey (National Guard)
  - 2nd Brigade
    - 1er Bataillon de Grenadiers de Ligne (National Guard)
    - 1er Bataillon du 6éme Régiment d'Infanterie de Ligne (Armagnac)
    - 7éme Bataillon de Paris (National Guard)
  - 3rd Brigade
    - 5éme Régiment de Hussards (Colonel Général)
    - 1er Bataillon du 8éme Régiment d'Infanterie de Ligne (Austrasie)
    - 2éme Bataillon de l'Ille-et-Vilaine (National Guard)
    - 6éme Bataillon de Paris (National Guard)

== See also ==
- French Revolutionary Army
- List of French generals of the Revolutionary and Napoleonic Wars
