= Auguste Marie Henri Picot de Dampierre =

General during the French Revolution

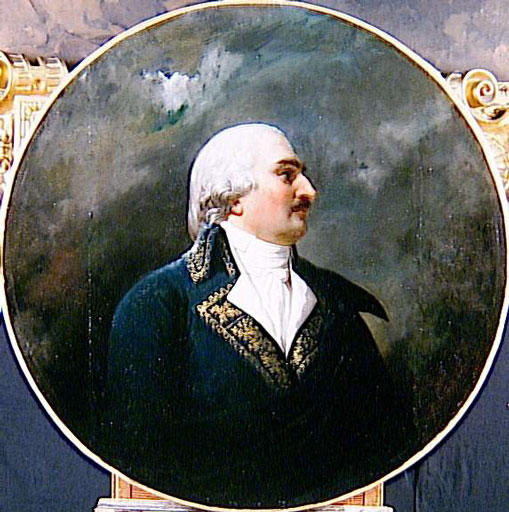
Auguste Marie Henri Picot, Marquis de Dampierre

Auguste Marie Henri Picot de Dampierre (French pronunciation: [oɡyst maʁi ɑ̃ʁi piko də dɑ̃pjɛʁ]; 19 August 1756 – 9 May 1793), styled the Marquis de Dampierre and usually known as Dampierre [dɑ̃.pjɛʁ], was a French general during the time of the French Revolution. He served in many of the early battles of the War of the First Coalition, and was killed in action in 1793. His name is among those inscribed on the Arc de Triomphe.

== Early life ==
Dampierre was born in Paris into a military family and was commissioned as a junior officer in the Gardes Françaises 17 May 1772. He was promoted to 1st Ensign 19 January 1777 and Sous-Lieutenant 15 June 1780, but then quit the Guards because he was dissatisfied with Marshal de Biron, and transferred to the Regiment of Chartres, 6 October 1784. He then became Major of the 2nd Chasseurs of Normandy 1 May 1788. During the 1780s he travelled to England and then to Berlin, where he studied Prussian military tactics. He became an admirer of Frederick II of Prussia, imitating him even down to the smallest detail, such as to appearing at court with a long tailed coat, which earned him a mockery from Louis XVI.

At the outbreak of the revolution, he was sympathetic to the new revolutionary ideas and resumed his military career, promoted Lieutenant-Colonel of the 5th Dragoons 25 July 1791, he became aide-de-camp to Rochambeau and then in April 1792 was made Colonel of the 5th dragoons under Biron. At the Battle of Quiévrain (30 April 1792) he was trampled by a horse whilst attempting to rally his routed troops, then, serving under Dumouriez, was promoted Marechal-de-Camp of the Army of the Ardennes.

== French Revolutionary Wars ==
At the Battle of Valmy, Dampierre commanded a division of the army of Beurnonville, then commanded the right wing at the Battle of Jemappes, where his troops presented him with a coronet for his bravery. Marching at the head of the Flanders regiment and a battalion of Paris volunteers, he attacked six enemy battalions threatening Beurnonville and aiding Beurnonville's successful advance.

Promoted General-de-Division on 8 March 1793, he commanded the right wing under Valence during the invasion of Holland and Flanders Campaign, and served under the Duke of Chartres at the Battle of Neerwinden on 18 March.

Following Dumouriez's flight, Dampierre was elected commander of the Army of the North and the Armée des Ardennes 4 April 1793, and withdrew these forces towards the Camp of Famars to re-organise. Under pressure from Paris and in an attempt to relieve besieged Condé, he attacked the Allies on 19 April but was repulsed after a stiff fight at St. Amand. At the Battle of Raismes on 8 May he again led his men to attack, but was repulsed once more and towards the end of the action hit in the thigh by a cannonball. He died of his wounds the next day at Valenciennes. He was buried in the main redoubt of the left at the Camp of Famars, but was reinterned at the Panthéon by the Convention on 11 May. His body was later removed. His name is inscribed on the north side of the Arc du Triomphe.
