= Army of the North (France) =

Name for French Army units

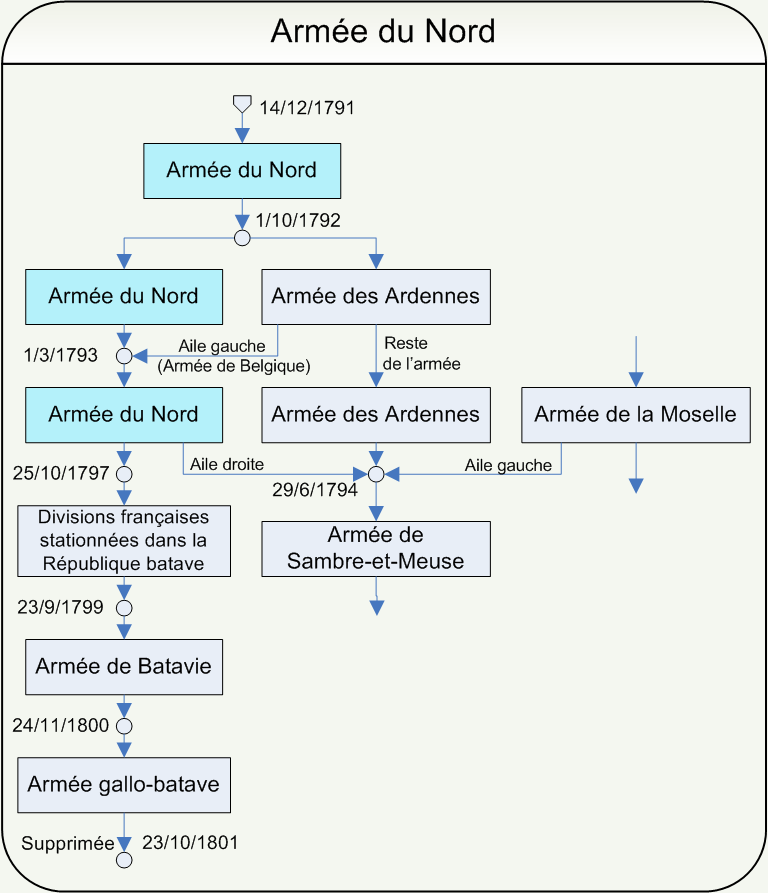
Evolution of the Armée du Nord

The Army of the North or Armée du Nord is a name given to several historical units of the French Army. The first was one of the French Revolutionary Armies that fought with distinction against the First Coalition from 1792 to 1795. Others existed during the Peninsular War, the Hundred Days and the Franco-Prussian War.

== Campaigns ==
=== 1791 to 1797 ===
At the creation of the Army of the North on 14 December 1791, the government of the Kingdom of France appointed Jean-Baptiste Donatien de Vimeur, comte de Rochambeau, as its commander. Rochambeau was replaced in May 1792, and he retired from service. The suspicious government of the French First Republic later charged him with treason and he barely escaped execution. In 1792–1794, the guillotine awaited military commanders who either failed, belonged to the nobility, or displayed insufficient revolutionary zeal. In the Army of the North these unfortunates included Nicolas Luckner, Adam Custine, and Jean Houchard.

Under Charles François Dumouriez, the Army of the North helped blunt the Prussian invasion at the Battle of Valmy on 20 September 1792. It also made up a large part of Dumouriez's expedition into the Austrian Netherlands which resulted in victory at the Battle of Jemappes on 6 November 1792.

On 18 March 1793, the Austrians defeated Dumouriez at the Battle of Neerwinden. Auguste Dampierre was killed in battle on 8 May at the Battle of Raismes near Valenciennes. Under François Joseph Drouot de Lamarche, the army lost again at the Battle of Famars on 23 May. Charles Edward Jennings de Kilmaine skirmished with the Coalition army at Caesar's Camp near Cambrai on 7 August. Houchard won the Battle of Hondshoote in September, forcing the English to raise the Siege of Dunkirk. Nevertheless, the government arrested Houchard for not following up his victory and executed him. Jean-Baptiste Jourdan won the Battle of Wattignies in October.

On 17–18 May 1794, the Army of the North won a victory at the Battle of Tourcoing while under the temporary leadership of Joseph Souham. The right wing of the army fought under Jourdan in an important victory at the Battle of Fleurus on 26 June. Soon after this, the Allied position in Flanders collapsed, leading to Austria's loss of Belgium and the extinction of the Dutch Republic in the winter of 1794–1795. During this period, the army was engaged in mopping up operations and sieges. On 25 October 1797, the Army of the North officially ceased to exist and its troops became an army of occupation in the newly created Batavian Republic.

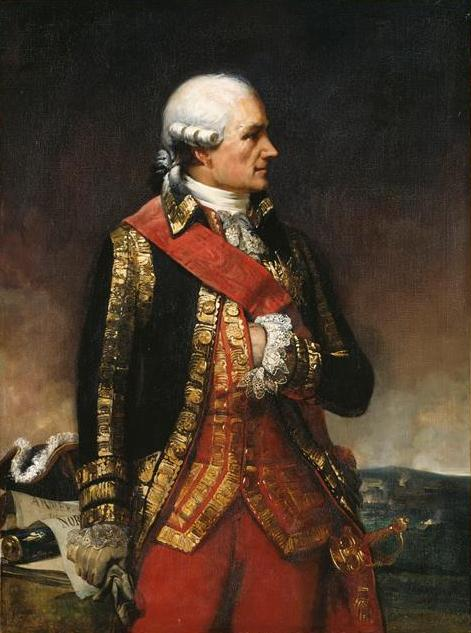
Marshal Jean-Baptiste de Rochambeau, first commander of the Army of the North

The Army of the North's commanders are listed as follows.

- Marshal Jean-Baptiste Donatien de Vimeur, comte de Rochambeau, 14 December 1791 – 18 May 1792
- Marshal Nicolas Luckner, 19 May – 11 July 1792
- Lieutenant-General Gilbert du Motier, marquis de Lafayette, 12 July – 19 August 1792
- Lieutenant-General Charles François Dumouriez, 18 August – 28 September 1792
- Lieutenant-General Anne François Augustin de La Bourdonnaye, 28 September – 25 November 1792
- Lieutenant-General Francisco de Miranda, 16 November 1792 – 1 February 1793
- Lieutenant-General Dumouriez, 2 February – 4 April 1793
- General of Division Auguste Marie Henri Picot Dampierre, 6 April – 8 May 1793 †
- Maréchal de camp François Joseph Drouot de Lamarche, 8 – 27 May 1793
- Lieutenant-General Adam Philippe, Comte de Custine, 28 May – 16 July 1793
- General of Division Charles Edward Jennings de Kilmaine, 17 July – 10 August 1793
- General of Division Jean Nicolas Houchard, 11 August – 23 September 1793
- General of Division Florent Joseph Duquesnoy, 24 – 25 November 1793
- General of Division Jean-Baptiste Jourdan, 25 September – 9 November 1793
- General of Division Duquesnoy, 10 – 14 November 1793
- General of Division Jourdan, 15 November 1793 – 12 January 1794
- General of Division Jacques Ferrand, 13 January – 8 February 1794
- General of Division Jean-Charles Pichegru, 9 February – 18 October 1794
- General of Division Jean Victor Marie Moreau, 19 October – 4 December 1794
- General of Division Pichegru, 5 December 1794 – 20 March 1795
- General of Division Moreau, 21 March 1795 – 29 March 1796
- General Joseph Souham, 30 March – 3 April 1796
- General Pierre de Ruel, marquis de Beurnonville, 4 April – 15 September 1796
- General Jean François Aimé Dejean, 16 September 1796 – 24 September 1797

=== 1811 to 1813 ===
The Army of the North in Spain formed in January 1811 and included soldiers from the Imperial Guard. Its duties included holding cities and fortresses in northern Spain, fighting guerillas, and keeping the roads to France clear. On 3–5 May 1811, about 1,600 cavalry and six artillery pieces belonging to the army fought at the Battle of Fuentes de Onoro. The Spanish beat a 1,500-man detachment on 23 June at Cogorderos in León (province). This action prevented the army from helping in the fight against Arthur Wellesley, Duke of Wellington's Anglo-Portuguese Army. Only 800 men fought at the Battle of Vitoria in June 1813. After the disastrous defeat at Vitoria, the Army of the North became part of the reorganized Army of Spain. Its commanders were as follows.

- Marshal Jean-Baptiste Bessières, January – July 1811
- General of Division Jean-Marie Dorsenne, July 1811 – May 1812
- General of Division Marie-François Auguste de Caffarelli du Falga, May 1812 – January 1813
- General of Division Bertrand Clausel, January 1813 – July 1813

=== 1815 ===
This name was also given to the force commanded by Napoleon Bonaparte during the Waterloo Campaign in 1815. At its height, including reserves, it numbered 130,000 strong and consisted of many veterans from previous campaigns. In terms of quality it was the best army Napoleon had commanded since 1812 when he had led his Grande Armée (Grand Army) to disaster in Russia. It also fielded proportionally more artillery (344 pieces) and significantly more cavalry, than had French armies in the campaigns of 1813 and 1814. Its left and right wings (Aile Gauche and Aile Droite) were under the independent command of Marshals Ney and Grouchy respectively, when Napoleon himself was not present to direct them.

This Armée du Nord is often mistakenly regarded as separate from Armée de la Réserve (Reserve Army), which it fought beside during the 1815 campaign. In fact the Armée de la Réserve was simply a large corps of the Armée du Nord that remained under Napoleon's direct command.

For more detailed organizational details on this Armée du Nord, see Order of Battle of the Waterloo Campaign.

=== 1870–1871 ===
During the Franco-Prussian War a new Army of the North was created under Louis Faidherbe to try to break the Siege of Paris from the North. The army had achieved several small victories at towns such as Ham, La Hallue, and Amiens and was protected by the belt of fortresses in northern France, allowing Faidherbe's men to launch quick attacks against isolated Prussian units, then retreat behind the fortresses. Despite access to the armaments factories of Lille, the Army of the North suffered from severe supply difficulties, which depressed morale. In January 1871, Léon Gambetta forced Faidherbe to march his army beyond the fortresses and engage the Prussians in open battle. The army was severely weakened by low morale, supply problems, the terrible winter weather and low troop quality, whilst general Faidherbe was unable to command due to his poor health, the result of decades of campaigning in West Africa. At the Battle of St. Quentin, the Army of the North suffered a crushing defeat and was scattered, releasing thousands of Prussian soldiers to be relocated to the East.

== See also ==
- French Revolutionary Wars
