= Joseph de Ferraris =

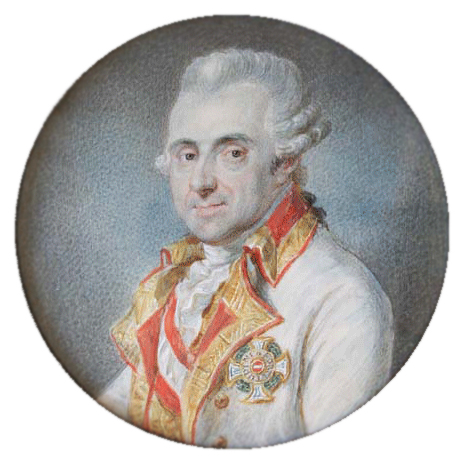
Count Joseph de Ferraris

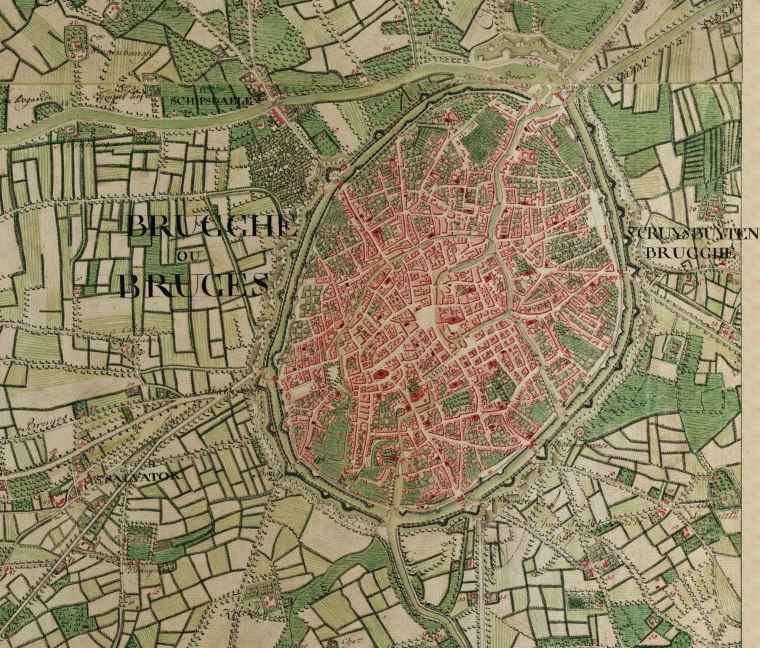
Bruges on the Ferraris map

Joseph Jean François, count de Ferraris (20 April 1726 – 1 April 1814) was an Austrian general and cartographer. He was married to the daughter of Charles, 2nd Duke d'Ursel.

== Biography ==
He was born on 20 April 1726 in Lunéville. Between 1771 and 1778, Ferraris was commissioned by Empress Maria Theresa and Emperor Joseph II to create a detailed Carte-de-Cabinet of the Austrian Netherlands. The maps were made on a scale 1:11,520, and formed a collection of 275 hand-coloured and hand-drawn maps 0,90 × 1,40 m each. These were accompanied by twelve volumes of handwritten commentaries relating to topics of economic and military interest (rivers, bridges, forests, possibilities for military camps, etc.).

He died on 1 April 1814 in Vienna.

== Ferraris map ==
Three originals of the map remain. One is in the Kriegsarchiv in Vienna, one is in the Rijksarchief in The Hague, and the third one remains in the Royal Library of Belgium in Brussels. The maps held in Brussels were the maps destined for Prince Charles Alexander of Lorraine, the Governor of the Austrian Netherlands, and were transferred to Belgium by Austria in 1922 as part of the World War I reparations. The handover of the maps was a provision of Annexe II to Part VIII, Section II of the Treaty of Saint-Germain-en-Laye.

In 1777 and 1778, Ferraris issued a reduced version of the cabinet maps with a scale of 1:86,400 in 25 maps, issued for commercial sale ("carte marchande").

The Ferraris maps were used to a great extent during the military operations of the French Revolutionary Wars and during the Napoleonic Wars. When the French invaded in 1792–1793, they took 400 copies of the map from a Brussels printer and seller. In 1794, they took the engraving plates to France so they could produce more maps for their own use and to prevent any enemy from acquiring copies. Louis Capitaine, a French engineer, copied it and produced two versions: one with 69 sheets and a smaller-scale version on six sheets, which was sold commercially. During the Waterloo Campaign, the Duke of Wellington had a copy of the six-sheet version, as it is probable that Gebhard Leberecht von Blücher also had a copy of the six-sheet version. Napoleon carried a copy of the full-scale Capitaine map while Gourgaud, an aide-de-camp to Napoleon, carried a copy of the Ferraris map. Both versions were very similar and about 40 years out of date (for instance, coal mines with their supporting infrastructure, which had developed around Charleroi in the interval between the map's drafting and 1815, were missing).

== Honours ==
The Brussels-based Flemish government building, housing parts of the Flemish ministry of Environment, Nature and Energy and the Flemish Ministry of Mobility and Public Works is named Graaf de Ferrarisgebouw after him.

== Sources ==
- De Coene, K.; Ongena, T.; Stragier, F.; Vervust, S.; Bracke, W.; De Maeyer, P. (2012), "Ferraris, the legend", The Cartographic Journal, 49 (11): 30–42, doi:10.1179/1743277411Y.0000000013, hdl:1854/LU-2116980, S2CID 129029280. — The history of the map and a map legend (which was not provided, with an explanation of why it was not).
- Clayton, Tim (2014), Waterloo: Four Days that Changed Europe's Destiny, Little, Brown Book Group, p. 58, ISBN 978-0-7481-3412-0
