= François Joseph Drouot de Lamarche =

French general

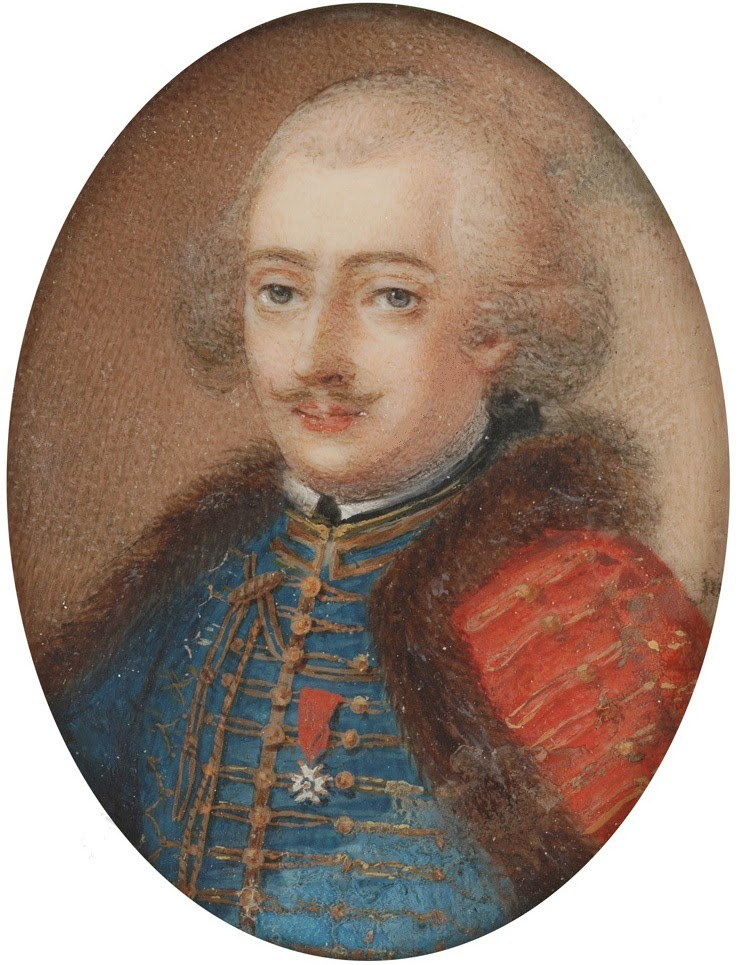
- Portrait of Captain-Commandant François Drouot dit Lamarche, 1784 by Alexis Judlin. He wears the cross of a knight of the Royal and Military Order of Saint Louis.
- Born: 14 July 1733; Wisches, France
- Died: 18 May 1814 (aged 80) Sarrebourg, Moselle, France
- Allegiance: France
- Branch: Cavalry
- Rank: General of Division
- Conflicts: War of the First Coalition; Battle of Valmy; Battle of Jemappes; Battle of Neerwinden; Battle of Famars

François Joseph Drouot de Lamarche (English: /druːˈoʊ də lɑːmɑːrʃ/, French: [fʁɑ̃swa ʒozɛf dʁuo də lamaʁʃ]; 14 July 1733 – 18 May 1814) briefly commanded a French army during the French Revolutionary Wars. He served in the French Royal Army as a cavalryman. In 1792 he was raised to the rank of general officer and fought at Valmy and Jemappes. The following year he led his troops at Neerwinden, was promoted to general of division and appointed to lead the Army of the North. Within three weeks he was defeated at Famars and resigned his army command. Soon afterward, he was denounced by the Revolutionary authorities and sacked, but he was lucky to escape the guillotine. A young Michel Ney served as his aide de camp. His surname is one of the names inscribed under the Arc de Triomphe, on Column 5.
