= Jacques Ferrand (general) =

French general

- Born: 14 November 1746; Ormoy, Haute-Saône, France
- Died: 30 September 1804 (aged 57) Amance, Haute-Saône, France
- Allegiance: France
- Branch: Infantry
- Service years: 1765–1802
- Rank: General of Division
- Conflicts: War of the First Coalition
- Awards: Knight of the Order of Saint Louis

Jacques Ferrand (14 November 1746 – 30 September 1804) was a French general and politician who fought in the War of the First Coalition.

== Career ==
Born in Ormoy, Haute-Saône on 14 November 1746, the son of a labourer, Ferrand enlisted in the Royal-infanterie regiment on 13 January 1765. He rose through the ranks, eventually becoming sergeant major of the Brie-infanterie regiment on 6 June 1776.

It was not until the French Revolution that he would become an officer. Commissioned as a sous-lieutenant on 1 April 1791 and made a knight of the Order of Saint Louis a few days afterwards. A year later he was promoted to captain and posted to the Army of the Ardennes where he became a chef de bataillon on 17 March 1793.

Ferrand joined the Army of the North in 1793 and, after distinguishing himself at the siege of Lille, was provisionally made a General de Brigade by Representatives of the People Le Bas and Duquesnoy on 17 August 1793. The promotion was confirmed by the executive council on 30 August. He briefly took command of the garrison of Dunkirk on 5 September 1793, following the dismissal from that post of Joseph Souham, and promoted to General de division on 8 September. However, Souham was quickly reinstated an retook command on 11 September. Both officers fought vigorously at the subsequent siege of Dunkirk, aided by Souham's chief of staff Lazare Hoche.

In October 1793, Ferrand was in command of the entrenched camp at Maubeuge in the run up to the Battle of Wattignies. On 4 November 1793, he took over command of the Army of the Ardennes from Jean-Baptiste Jourdan when the latter took command of the Army of the North. Two months later, Jourdan was dismissed from that post, and Ferrand commanded the Army of the North from 7 January 1794 until Jean-Charles Pichegru arrived to take command on 8 February. Ferrand resumed command of the 2nd division and continued to serve in the Flanders Campaign of 1794, leading a wing at Beaumont, capturing Mons without a fight, and commanding the garrison at Brussels.

The following year Ferrand transferred to the Army of the Rhine, where he was placed in command of the 6th Military Division at Besançon on 24 May 1795. Here he discovered a royalist plot aimed at inciting an uprising in Franche-Comté and surrendering Besançon to the Prince of Condé. However, on reporting the plot, he was himself denounced as a conspirator, dismissed from the army and imprisoned on 19 January 1796. His innocence was recognised and he was released, then reinstated by Lazare Carnot on 16 March 1795 only to retire five days later.

Ferrand served as mayor of Amance, Haute-Saône, and was elected to the Council of Five Hundred as deputy for Haute-Saône on 12 April 1797. He voted consistently with Pichegru and, suspected of royalism, had his election annulled in the Coup of 18 Fructidor on 4 September that year. He was given command of the 2nd Demi-Brigade of Veterans in Franche-Comté on 5 August 1800, and retired on 16 December 1802.

Jacques Ferrand died in Amance on 30 September 1804 (aged 57).

The name "Ferrand" appears engraved on the north pillar of the Arc de Triomphe, and probably refers to Jacques Ferrand, though it may refer to General Jean Henri Becays Ferrand instead.
