= Battle of Jemappes order of battle =

In the Battle of Jemappes on 6 November 1792, a French army led by Charles François Dumouriez attacked and defeated an Austrian army commanded by Albert of Saxe-Teschen. Though the Austrians were outnumbered three-to-one, the victory greatly encouraged the population of the young French First Republic and lead to the evacuation of Austrian forces from the Austrian Netherlands. Note: all units have their names as they are translated in English.

== Army of the Ardennes ==
The Army of the Ardennes is led by Divisional General Charles-François du Périer Dumouriez. Dumouriez gave his army the private name of the 'Army of Belgium' (Armée de la Belgique), however this was never officially recognised or adopted. Note: all cavalry regiments have 3 x squadrons unless otherwise noted. All line infantry regiments have 2 x battalions unless other wise noted.

- Army of the Ardennes, commanded by Divisional General Charles-François du Périer Dumouriez
  - Reserve, commanded by Maréchal de Camp Louis-Charles de La Motte-Ango, Vicomte de Flers
    - 2 x Squadrons, Gendarmerie Nationale
    - 2nd–5th (at least) plus more? Battalions, Grenadiers of the Ardennes
  - Cavalry (2 x Squadrons each)
    - 1st Brigade
      - 3rd Dragoon Regiment
      - 7th Dragoon Regiment
    - 2nd Brigade
      - 5th Dragoon Regiment
      - 13th Dragoon Regiment

=== Advance Guard ===
- Advance Guard, commanded by Lieutenant General Pierre de Ruel, marquis de Beurnonville
  - 1 x Horse Artillery Battery
  - 3rd Light Artillery Company
  - 6th Light Artillery Company
  - Dampièrre's Brigade, commanded by Maréchal de Camp Auguste Marie Henri Pictor, Marquis de Dampierre
    - 1st Hussar Regiment
    - 2nd Hussar Regiment
    - 6th Hussar Regiment
    - 3rd Chasseurs à Cheval Regiment
    - 6th Chasseurs à Cheval Regiment
    - 12th Chasseurs à Cheval Regiment
    - 1 x Battalion, Belgian Legion
    - 1st Grenadier Battalion of the Ardennes
    - 6th Grenadier Battalion of the Ardennes
    - 1 x Battalion, 19th Line Infantry Regiment
    - 1st Battalion, Paris National Guard
    - 2nd Battalion, Paris National Guard
    - 10th Chasseurs à Pied Battalion
    - 14th Chasseurs à Pied Battalion
    - Company of the Four Nations
    - 1st Free Company
    - 3rd Free Company
    - Chasseur Company of Cambrelots
  - Flankers of the Left, commanded by General Joseph de Miaczynski
    - 1 x Battalion, 99th Line Infantry Regiment
    - 5th Chasseurs à Pied Battalion
  - Flankers of the Right, commanded by Brigade General Henri Christian Michel de Stengel
    - 3rd Battalion, Ardennes National Guard
    - 11th Chasseurs à Pied Battalion
    - Company of Clemendos

=== Right Wing ===
- Right Wing, commanded by Maréchal de Camp Jean Henri Becays Ferrand

==== First Line ====
- First Line, commanded by Maréchal de Camp Jean Henri Becays Ferrand
  - 1st Brigade
    - 5th Battalion, Seine Inférieure National Guard
    - 1st Battalion, Charente National Guard
    - 17th Federals Battalion
  - 3rd Brigade
    - 1st Battalion, Deux Sèvres National Guard
    - 1st Battalion, Meurthe National Guard
    - 1st Battalion, Vendée National Guard
  - 5th Brigade
    - 29th Line Infantry Regiment
    - Gravilliers National Guard Battalion
    - 1st Battalion, Côtes du Nord National Guard
  - 7th Brigade
    - 2nd Battalion, 54th Line Infantry Regiment
    - Lombards National Guard Battalion
    - 2nd Battalion, Marne National Guard

==== Second Line ====
- Second Line, commanded by General de Brigade Pierre Louis de Blottefière
  - 9th Brigade
    - 83rd Line Infantry Regiment
    - Republican National Guard
  - 11th Brigade
    - 78th Line Infantry Regiment
    - 4th Battalion, Meuse National Guard
    - 5th Battalion, Meurthe National Guard
  - 13th Brigade
    - 1st Battalion, Marne National Guard
    - 1st Battalion, Mayenne et Loire National Guard
    - 2nd Battalion, Eure National Guard
  - 15th Brigade
    - 1st Battalion, 98th Line Infantry Regiment
    - 1st Battalion, Seine Inférieure National Guard
    - 1st Battalion, Seine et Oise National Guard

=== Left Wing ===
- Left Wing, commanded by Lieutenant General Francisco de Miranda y Rodríguez de Espinoza

==== First Line ====
- First Line, commanded by Brigade General Louis Théobald Ihler
  - 2nd Brigade, commanded by Brigade General Jean Daniel Pinet de Borde-Desforêts
    - 1 x Battalion, 1st Line Infantry Regiment
    - 1st Battalion, Aisne National Guard
    - Sainte Marguerite National Guard Battalion
  - 4th Brigade
    - 1st Battalion, Côte d'Or National Guard
    - 2nd Battalion, Vienne National Guard
    - 3rd Battalion, Yonne National Guard
  - 6th Brigade
    - 1st Battalion, 49th Line Infantry Regiment
    - 1st Battalion, Eure et Loir National Guard
    - 9th Federals Battalion
  - 8th Brigade
    - 1st Battalion, 71st Line Infantry Regiment
    - 3rd Marne National Guard
    - Saint-Denis National Guard Battalion

==== Second Line ====
- Second Line, commanded by Maréchal de Camp Maximilien Ferdinand Thomas Stettenhofen
  - 10th Brigade, commanded by Maréchal de Camp Jean Daniel Pinet de Borde-Desforêts
    - 72nd Line Infantry Regiment
    - Butte des Moulins National Guard Battalion
  - 12th Brigade
    - 94th Line Infantry Regiment
    - 1st Battalion, Pas de Calais National Guard
    - 9th Battalion, Paris National Guard
  - 14th Brigade
    - 1st Battalion, Allier National Guard
    - 1st Battalion, Nièvre National Guard
    - 1st Battalion, Seine et Marne National Guard
  - 16th Brigade
    - 104th Line Infantry Regiment
    - Paris Battalion of Grenadiers
    - 3rd Battalion, Seine et Oise National Guard

== Austrian Army of the Netherlands ==
The Austrian Army of the Netherlands guarded the entirety of the Austrian Netherlands (mostly encompassing modern day Belgium) and was one of the few field armies in service during the time of the battle. By 7 November, the Army was evacuated to Germany and broken up shortly thereafter. All infantry regiments have 2 x battalions, and cavalry have 4 x squadrons unless otherwise noted.

- Austrian Army of the Netherlands, commanded by Feldmarschallleutnant Josef Karl, Baron von Lilien
  - Cavalry Reserve, commanded by Generalmajor Lamberg
    - 1/2, Coburg Dragoon Regiment Nr. 37 (4 x squadrons)
    - Latour Chevauléger Regiment Nr. 31 (2 x squadrons)
    - Esterházy Hussar Regiment Nr. 32 (2 x squadrons)
  - Infantry Reserve
    - 1 x Battalion, Hohenlohe Infantry Regiment Nr. 17
    - Mattheson Infantry Regiment Nr. 42 (4 x companies)
    - 5 x Companies, Tirolean Sharpshooters

=== Right Wing ===
Note: Both free corps totalled 873 men in 7 companies

- Right Wing, commanded by Feldmarschallleutnant Josef Karl, Baron von Lilien
  - Grüne-Loudon Free Corps
  - O'Donnel's Free Corps
  - Archduke Karl's Brigade, commanded by Generalmajor Archduke Karl Laurentius of Austria
    - Morzin Grenadier Battalion
    - Barthodeiszky of Rátk and Salamonfa Grenadier Battalion
  - Kaim's Brigade, commanded by Oberst Konrad Valentin Ritter von Kaim
    - Blankenstein Hussar Regiment Nr. 16 (3 x squadrons)
    - Bender Infantry Regiment Nr. 41

=== The Centre ===
- Centre, commanded by Feldzeugmeister François Sébastien Charles Joseph de Croix, Count of Clerfayt
  - Boros' Brigade, commanded by Generalmajor Adam Boros de Rákos
    - 1/2, Coburg Dragoon Regiment Nr. 37 (4 x squadrons)
  - Mikoviny's Brigade, commanded by Generalmajor Stanislaus Mikovényi de Breznobánya
    - Leeuven Grenadier Battalion
    - Pückler Grenadier Battalion
    - Würzburg Infantry Regiment (HRE, not Austrian)

=== Left Wing ===
- Left Wing, commanded by Feldmarschallleutnant Johann Peter, Count Beaulieu de Marconnay
  - 1 x Squadron, Blankenstein Hussar Regiment Nr. 16
  - Servisches Free Corps (5 x companies)
  - Jordis' Brigade, commanded by Generalmajor Alexander, Freiherr von Jordis
    - 1 x Battalion, Hohenlohe Infantry Regiment Nr. 17
    - Stuart Infantry Regiment Nr. 18

== See also ==
- List of orders of battle
