= Amance =

Amance is the name of several places in France:

- Amance (river), a river in the Haute-Marne and Haute-Saône département
- Amance, Aube, a commune in the Aube département
- Amance, Meurthe-et-Moselle, in a commune the Meurthe-et-Moselle département
- Amance, Haute-Saône, in a commune the Haute-Saône département
