= List of protected heritage sites in Mons =

This table shows an overview of the protected heritage sites in the Walloon town Mons, or Bergen. This list is part of Belgium's national heritage.

Object	Year/architect	Town/section	Address	Coordinates	Number^{?}	Image
Conservatory of Music, former girls convent of Notre Dame ^{(nl)} ^{(fr)}		Mons	rue de Nimy, n° 7	50.455711°N 3.953053°E	53053-CLT-0003-01	Muziekconservatorium, voormalig meisjesklooster van Notre-Dame
Church of Saint-Nicolas-and-Havre ^{(nl)} ^{(fr)}		Mons		50.454377°N 3.957146°E	53053-CLT-0005-01	Kerk Saint-Nicolas-en-Havré
Museum of Centenaire, old Bank van Lening ^{(nl)} ^{(fr)}		Mons	rue du 11 Novembre	50.455929°N 3.951274°E	53053-CLT-0006-01	Museum van Centenaire, oude Mont-de-Piété
Witnesses to the activity of the underground flint mine and the ensemble of the "Camp à Caillaux" ^{(nl)} ^{(fr)}		Mons	Cailloux	50.418832°N 3.986593°E	53053-CLT-0009-01	Getuigen van de activiteit van de ondergrondse exploitatie van de vuursteen en het ensemble van het "Camp à Caillaus"
House called "Halle des Pelletiers" ^{(nl)} ^{(fr)}		Mons	rue de la Poterie n° 2	50.453660°N 3.950929°E	53053-CLT-0010-01	Huis genaamd "Halle des Pelletiers"
Old Hôtel de Sant Peis, currently headquarters of the Federation of Tourism Hainaut ^{(nl)} ^{(fr)}		Mons	rue des Clercs n° 31	50.453471°N 3.949767°E	53053-CLT-0011-01	Oud Hôtel de Peissant, momenteel hoofd van de Federatie van Toerisme Henegouwen
Saint Waltrude Collegiate Church ^{(nl)} ^{(fr)}		Mons		50.453471°N 3.947658°E	53053-CLT-0013-01	Collegiale kerk Sainte-Waudru
Belfry of Mons ^{(nl)} ^{(fr)}		Mons		50.454091°N 3.950023°E	53053-CLT-0014-01	Belfort van Bergen
Town hall ^{(nl)} ^{(fr)}		Mons		50.454896°N 3.952188°E	53053-CLT-0015-01	Raadhuis
Campanile of the Church Sainte-Elisabeth ^{(nl)} ^{(fr)}		Mons		50.455589°N 3.954304°E	53053-CLT-0016-01	Campanile van de kerk Sainte-Elisabeth
Church Sainte-Elisabeth: classification of the total building ^{(nl)} ^{(fr)}		Mons		50.455538°N 3.954406°E	53053-CLT-0017-01	Kerk Sainte-Elisabeth: classificatie van het totale gebouw
Hôtel de la Couronne Imperiale ^{(nl)} ^{(fr)}		Mons	Grand Place n°s 23-24	50.454657°N 3.951924°E	53053-CLT-0019-01	Hôtel de la Couronne Impériale
Well, at Marche-aux-old Poulets, rue des 4 fils Aymont ^{(nl)} ^{(fr)}		Mons		50.457435°N 3.952755°E	53053-CLT-0020-01	Put, oude te Marché-aux-Poulets, rue des 4 fils Aymont
House "Jean Lescarts" ^{(nl)} ^{(fr)}		Mons	rue Neuve	50.456228°N 3.952184°E	53053-CLT-0021-01	Huis "Jean Lescarts"
Tower of Val des Ecoliers ^{(nl)} ^{(fr)}		Mons	rue André Masquelier, n° 40	50.450780°N 3.941417°E	53053-CLT-0022-01	Toren van Val des Ecoliers
Chapel of Saint Calixte ^{(nl)} ^{(fr)}		Mons		50.454027°N 3.949085°E	53053-CLT-0023-01	Kapel Saint Calixte
House "La Toison d'Or" ^{(nl)} ^{(fr)}		Mons	Grand Place, rechts van het raadhuis	50.454981°N 3.952339°E	53053-CLT-0025-01	Huis "La Toison d'Or"
House "ancien Cafe de Commerce" ^{(nl)} ^{(fr)}		Mons	Grand Place	50.455030°N 3.952460°E	53053-CLT-0026-01	Huis "ancien Café de Commerce"
Old chapel of Saint-Georges ^{(nl)} ^{(fr)}		Mons	Grand-Place, links van raadhuis	50.454867°N 3.951878°E	53053-CLT-0027-01	Oude kapel Saint-Georges
Attaca, including Sainte-Marguerite chapel and museum Chaonoine Puissant ^{(nl)} ^{(fr)}		Mons	rue Notre-Dame Débonnaire n° 22 en rue des Sars	50.454427°N 3.947481°E	53053-CLT-0028-01	"Attaca", waaronder kapel Sainte-Marguerite en het museum Chaonoine Puissant
Attaca, including Sainte-Marguerite chapel and museum Chaonoine Puissant: extension of the classification of parcels 122 and 122 e2 d2 ^{(nl)} ^{(fr)}		Mons	rue Notre-Dame Débonnaire n° 22 en rue des Sars	50.455418°N 3.946894°E	53053-CLT-0029-01	"Attaca", waaronder kapel Sainte-Marguerite en het museum Chaonoine Puissant: uitbreiding van de classificatie met percelen 122 e2 en 122 d2
Old shelter of the abbey of Belian: main front facade and roof ^{(nl)} ^{(fr)}		Mons	rue d'Havré n°88	50.453741°N 3.956420°E	53053-CLT-0030-01	Oud onderdak van de abdij van Bélian: hoofdgevel en voorzijde dak
House called "Espagnole" ^{(nl)} ^{(fr)}		Mons	rue des Clercs n° 32	50.453626°N 3.949703°E	53053-CLT-0031-01	Huis genaamd "Espagnole"
The Old Hospice Cantimpret: chapel ^{(nl)} ^{(fr)}		Mons		50.449590°N 3.945150°E	53053-CLT-0032-01	Oud Hospice de Cantimpret: kapel
Well in the square "Place du Chapitre" ^{(nl)} ^{(fr)}		Mons		50.453082°N 3.948188°E	53053-CLT-0033-01	Put van place du Chapitre
Gothic door ^{(nl)} ^{(fr)}		Mons	rue courte, n° 2	50.453380°N 3.950163°E	53053-CLT-0034-01	Gotische deur
Old shelter of the abbey of Aulne: facade ^{(nl)} ^{(fr)}		Mons	rue d'Havré n° 36	50.453644°N 3.954043°E	53053-CLT-0035-01	Oud onderdak van de abdij van Aulne: gevel
Facade of the former sanctuary of the Abbey of Saint-Denis and Broqueroie ^{(nl)} ^{(fr)}		Mons	rue de Houdain n° 17	50.452047°N 3.952444°E	53053-CLT-0037-01	Gevel van het voormalige toevluchtsoord van de abdij Saint-Denis en Broqueroie
House facade ^{(nl)} ^{(fr)}		Mons	rue du Miroir n° 8	50.454609°N 3.953516°E	53053-CLT-0038-01	Huis: gevel
House: main facade and roof (street frontage) ^{(nl)} ^{(fr)}		Mons	rue de Nimy n° 8	50.455234°N 3.953299°E	53053-CLT-0040-01	Huis: hoofdgevel en voorzijde dak aan straatkant
Bonne Maison de Bouzenton, former Hospice des Orphelins ^{(nl)} ^{(fr)}		Mons		50.450048°N 3.947087°E	53053-CLT-0041-01	Bonne Maison de Bouzenton, voormalig Hospice des Orphelins
Pavilion totality of the remains located on the terrace of the garden of the Hôtel Vieil ^{(nl)} ^{(fr)}		Mons	rue Terre du Prince, n° 17	50.451857°N 3.948397°E	53053-CLT-0042-01	
Tower Valenciennoise ^{(nl)} ^{(fr)}		Mons	rue des Arbalestriers	50.458429°N 3.958665°E	53053-CLT-0043-01	Toren Valenciennoise
Cellars of the house ^{(nl)} ^{(fr)}		Mons	Grand Place n° 25	50.454542°N 3.951797°E	53053-CLT-0047-01	
House: main facade and roof, extending 53053_CLT_047 ^{(nl)} ^{(fr)}		Mons	Grand Place n° 25	50.454535°N 3.951824°E	53053-CLT-0048-01	Huis: hoofdgevel en dak, uitbreiding van 53053_CLT_047
Building: front facades and roofs ^{(nl)} ^{(fr)}		Mons	Grand'Place n° 4	50.454145°N 3.952416°E	53053-CLT-0049-01	Gebouw: gevels en daken voorzijde
Building: gable roof and front ^{(nl)} ^{(fr)}		Mons	Grand'Place n° 5	50.454190°N 3.952453°E	53053-CLT-0050-01	Gebouw: gevel en dak voorzijde
Building: front facades and roofs ^{(nl)} ^{(fr)}		Mons	Grand'Place n° 6	50.454237°N 3.952503°E	53053-CLT-0051-01	Gebouw: gevels en daken voorzijde
Building: front facades and roofs ^{(nl)} ^{(fr)}		Mons	Grand'Place n° 7	50.454318°N 3.952588°E	53053-CLT-0052-01	Gebouw: gevels en daken voorzijde
Building: front facades and roofs ^{(nl)} ^{(fr)}		Mons	Grand'Place n° 8	50.454372°N 3.952652°E	53053-CLT-0053-01	Gebouw: gevels en daken voorzijde
Building: front facades and roofs ^{(nl)} ^{(fr)}		Mons	Grand'Place n° 12	50.454636°N 3.952952°E	53053-CLT-0054-01	Gebouw: gevels en daken voorzijde
Building: front facades and roofs ^{(nl)} ^{(fr)}		Mons	Grand'Place n° 13	50.454775°N 3.953055°E	53053-CLT-0055-01	Gebouw: gevels en daken voorzijde
Building: front facades and roofs ^{(nl)} ^{(fr)}		Mons	Grand'Place n° 14	50.454817°N 3.953097°E	53053-CLT-0056-01	Gebouw: gevels en daken voorzijde
Building: front facades and roofs ^{(nl)} ^{(fr)}		Mons	Grand'Place n° 15	50.454926°N 3.953168°E	53053-CLT-0057-01	Gebouw: gevels en daken voorzijde
Old Hotel du Miroir: front facades and roofs ^{(nl)} ^{(fr)}		Mons	Grand'Place n° 16	50.454963°N 3.953099°E	53053-CLT-0058-01	Oud Hôtel du Miroir: gevels en daken voorzijde
Building: front facades and roofs ^{(nl)} ^{(fr)}		Mons	Grand'Place n° 27	50.454383°N 3.951746°E	53053-CLT-0059-01	Gebouw: gevels en daken voorzijde
Building: front facades and roofs ^{(nl)} ^{(fr)}		Mons	Grand'Place n° 28	50.454228°N 3.951770°E	53053-CLT-0060-01	Gebouw: gevels en daken voorzijde
Ensemble of the Mont Panisel and the Bois-La-Haut ^{(nl)} ^{(fr)}		Mons		50.436424°N 3.968796°E	53053-CLT-0061-01	Ensemble van de Mont Panisel en het Bois-Là-Haut
Building: front facades and roofs ^{(nl)} ^{(fr)}		Mons	Grand'Place n° 29	50.454190°N 3.951758°E	53053-CLT-0063-01	Gebouw: gevels en daken voorzijde
Building: front facades and roofs ^{(nl)} ^{(fr)}		Mons	Grand'Place n° 30	50.454119°N 3.951726°E	53053-CLT-0064-01	Gebouw: gevels en daken voorzijde
Building: front facades and roofs ^{(nl)} ^{(fr)}		Mons	Grand'Place n° 31	50.453992°N 3.951856°E	53053-CLT-0065-01	Gebouw: gevels en daken voorzijde
Building: front facades and roofs ^{(nl)} ^{(fr)}		Mons	Grand'Place n° 32	50.453944°N 3.951869°E	53053-CLT-0066-01	Gebouw: gevels en daken voorzijde
Building: front facades and roofs ^{(nl)} ^{(fr)}		Mons	Grand'Place n° 33	50.453893°N 3.951867°E	53053-CLT-0067-01	Gebouw: gevels en daken voorzijde
Building: front facades and roofs ^{(nl)} ^{(fr)}		Mons		50.453957°N 3.952531°E	53053-CLT-0068-01	Gebouw: gevels en daken voorzijde
Portion of the wall of Baudouin, part of the old town wall dating from the period of the Counts of Hainault ^{(nl)} ^{(fr)}		Mons	rue de la Terre du Prince	50.452806°N 3.948285°E	53053-CLT-0069-01	Gedeelte van de muur va Baudouin, gravelijke omwalling
Facade of Royal Lyceum Marguerite Bervoets ^{(nl)} ^{(fr)}		Mons	rue d'Enghien	50.455406°N 3.950338°E	53053-CLT-0070-01	Gevel van koninklijk lyceum Marguerite Bervoets
House, former sanctuary of the abbey of Hasnon: street facade and roof ^{(nl)} ^{(fr)}		Mons	rue de Nimy n°s 24-26-28	50.455989°N 3.954300°E	53053-CLT-0071-01	Huis, voormalig toevluchtsoord van de abdij van Hasnon: gevel en dak straatzijde
Former Jesuit College, now Central Library ^{(nl)} ^{(fr)}		Mons	rue Marguerite Bervoets, n°2	50.454716°N 3.949996°E	53053-CLT-0073-01	Voormalige jezuïetencollege, nu centrale bibliotheek
Ensemble of the Place du Parc, including the sidewalks at the foot of the facades ^{(nl)} ^{(fr)}		Mons		50.457706°N 3.951365°E	53053-CLT-0075-01	Ensemble van de Place du Parc, inclusief de trottoirs aan de voet van de gevels
Place du Parc, including the sidewalks at the foot of the walls and rue des Fill Ettes: extension ^{(nl)} ^{(fr)}		Mons		50.457907°N 3.951238°E	53053-CLT-0076-01	Place du Parc, inclusief de trottoirs aan de voet van de gevels en rue des Fillettes: uitbreiding
House: walls and roofs ^{(nl)} ^{(fr)}		Mons	rue du Hautbois n° 33	50.453063°N 3.954575°E	53053-CLT-0077-01	Huis: gevels en daken
House: walls and roofs ^{(nl)} ^{(fr)}		Mons	rue du Hautbois n° 35	50.453078°N 3.954630°E	53053-CLT-0078-01	Huis: gevels en daken
Building: walls and roofs ^{(nl)} ^{(fr)}		Mons	rue des Soeurs grises n° 11	50.451348°N 3.946524°E	53053-CLT-0079-01	Gebouw: gevels en daken
House facade ^{(nl)} ^{(fr)}		Mons	rue du Onze-Novembre n° 5	50.455775°N 3.950690°E	53053-CLT-0080-01	Huis: gevel
Barracks Casemates ^{(nl)} ^{(fr)}		Mons	place Nervienne	50.447936°N 3.945545°E	53053-CLT-0081-01	Kazernes kazematten
House and Gossuin omliggen park ^{(nl)} ^{(fr)}		Mons	rue Samson n° 25	50.452754°N 3.948453°E	53053-CLT-0082-01	Huis Gossuin en omliggen park
Square Saint-Germain ^{(nl)} ^{(fr)}		Mons		50.453157°N 3.948656°E	53053-CLT-0083-01	Square Saint-Germain
House facade and roof ^{(nl)} ^{(fr)}		Mons	rue du Hautbois n° 15	50.452783°N 3.954127°E	53053-CLT-0084-01	Huis: gevel en dak
Parc du Waux-Hall ^{(nl)} ^{(fr)}		Mons	avenue Reine Astrid	50.451575°N 3.962941°E	53053-CLT-0085-01	Parc du Waux-Hall
Climb to the church of Saint-Denis ^{(nl)} ^{(fr)}		MOns		50.490111°N 4.017351°E	53053-CLT-0086-01	Klim naar de kerk van Saint-Denis
Water Machine: facades and roofs of the hall and outbuildings ^{(nl)} ^{(fr)}		Mons	boulevard Dolez	50.449986°N 3.956949°E	53053-CLT-0087-01	Watermachine: gevels en daken van de hal en bijgebouwen
Ensemble of the Mons Belfry, the square and the remains of the ancient castle of the Counts of Hainaut ^{(nl)} ^{(fr)}		Mons		50.454764°N 3.948709°E	53053-CLT-0088-01	Ensemble van het Belfort van Bergen, het plein en de overblijfselen van het oude kasteel van de graven van Henegouwen
Ensemble of the mills of the abbey from the 17th century, the waterfall and the environment ^{(nl)} ^{(fr)}		Mons		50.495098°N 4.018825°E	53053-CLT-0089-01	Ensemble van de molen van de abdij uit de 17e eeuw, de waterval en de omgeving
Watermill Saint-Denis: mill machinery, small building with wing ^{(nl)} ^{(fr)}		Mons		50.494812°N 4.020385°E	53053-CLT-0090-01	Watermolen Saint-Denis: molen met machinerie, klein gebouw met vleugel
Chapel Notre-Dame du Moulineau and environment ^{(nl)} ^{(fr)}		Mons		50.490574°N 3.907494°E	53053-CLT-0091-01	Kapel Notre-Dame du Moulineau en omgeving
Green space which extends to the rear of three houses located on the rue Jean Lescarts ^{(nl)} ^{(fr)}		Mons		50.452365°N 3.954894°E	53053-CLT-0092-01	
Certain parts of the building ^{(nl)} ^{(fr)}		Mons	rue Jean Lescarts n° 11	50.452317°N 3.955136°E	53053-CLT-0093-01	Bepaalde delen van het gebouw
House courtyard walls, garden walls, cladding and roofs, staircases of honor and service, lounge typical of the early 19th century ^{(nl)} ^{(fr)}		Mons	rue J. Lescarts n°13	50.451951°N 3.955266°E	53053-CLT-0094-01	Huis: gevels binnenplaats, gevels tuin, bekleding en daken, trappenhuizen van eer en service, salon typisch voor de vroege 19e eeuw
House: main facade, roof and gable right ^{(nl)} ^{(fr)}		Mons	rue de Nimy n° 31	50.455783°N 3.953699°E	53053-CLT-0096-01	Huis: hoofdgevel, dak en puntgevel rechts
Hôtel de Maître: front facade and roof ^{(nl)} ^{(fr)}		Mons	rue du Gouvernement n° s 27-29	50.455507°N 3.958453°E	53053-CLT-0097-01	Hôtel de maître: voorgevel en voorzijde dak
Terril of Héribus ^{(nl)} ^{(fr)}		Mons		50.435374°N 3.936180°E	53053-CLT-0099-01	Terril van Héribus
House Van Gogh ^{(nl)} ^{(fr)}		Mons	sentier du Pavillon n° s 53-55	50.441338°N 3.925162°E	53053-CLT-0101-01	Huis Van Gogh
"Bois brûlé" (wood) ^{(nl)} ^{(fr)}		Mons		50.486447°N 3.922871°E	53053-CLT-0103-01	Bos brûlé
Castle of Havre ^{(nl)} ^{(fr)}		Mons	rue du château, Havré	50.464448°N 4.039160°E	53053-CLT-0104-01	Kasteel van Havré
St. Martin's Church: choir ^{(nl)} ^{(fr)}		Mons		50.464398°N 4.044978°E	53053-CLT-0106-01	Kerk Saint-Martin: koor
Chapel of "Bon Vouloir" ^{(nl)} ^{(fr)}		Mons	rue Ed. Deweze n° 97	50.459617°N 4.032491°E	53053-CLT-0107-01	Kapel van "Bon Vouloir"
Near the chapel of Notre-Dame du Bon Vouloir ^{(nl)} ^{(fr)}		Mons	rue Ed. Deweze n° 97	50.459282°N 4.031755°E	53053-CLT-0108-01	Buurt van de kapel van Notre-Dame du Bon Vouloir
Stone "Le Coq", commemorating the Battle of Jemappes ^{(nl)} ^{(fr)}		Mons		50.442820°N 3.882301°E	53053-CLT-0109-01	Gedenksteen "Le Coq", herdenking van de Slag bij Jemappes
House, a traditional 17th-century facades and roofs ^{(nl)} ^{(fr)}		Mons	ruelle du Cerf Blanc	50.458104°N 3.951298°E	53053-CLT-0112-01	Huis, traditioneel uit de 17e eeuw: gevels en daken
Chapel of Saint-Macaire ^{(nl)} ^{(fr)}		Mons	rue de Saint-Macaire	50.472532°N 4.015339°E	53053-CLT-0114-01	Kapel Saint-Macaire
Old Ursuline Convent and chapel: walls and roofs ^{(nl)} ^{(fr)}		Mons	rue de Bettignies	50.453897°N 3.945198°E	53053-CLT-0115-01	Oud Ursulinenklooster en kapel:gevels en daken
Old Irish Hospice des Chart: facade and roof ^{(nl)} ^{(fr)}		Mons	rue des Chartiers, n° 12	50.449887°N 3.953250°E	53053-CLT-0116-01	Oud hospice des Chartiers: gevel en dak
Hôtel de Maître: facades and roofs, and the garden ^{(nl)} ^{(fr)}		Mons	rue des Telliers n° 20	50.455341°N 3.948863°E	53053-CLT-0117-01	Hôtel de Maître: gevels en daken, en de tuin
Palace of Justice ^{(nl)} ^{(fr)}		Mons	Rue de Nimy n° 35	50.456206°N 3.953571°E	53053-CLT-0118-01	Justitieel Paleis
Facades and roofs of the house Losseau ^{(nl)} ^{(fr)}		Mons	Rue de Nimy n° 37	50.456258°N 3.954202°E	53053-CLT-0119-01	Gevels en daken van het huis Losseau
Interior Losseau house: ground floor, stairs and landing opening onto the first floor ^{(nl)} ^{(fr)}		Mons	Rue de Nimy n° 37	50.456267°N 3.954137°E	53053-CLT-0120-01	
Facades and roofs of the Masonic Lodge ^{(nl)} ^{(fr)}		Mons	rue Chisaire n° 16	50.451933°N 3.942944°E	53053-CLT-0122-01	Gevels en daken van de vrijmetselaarsloge
House: walls and roofs ^{(nl)} ^{(fr)}		Mons	place du Parc n° 14	50.458208°N 3.951501°E	53053-CLT-0123-01	Huis: gevels en daken
House: walls and roofs ^{(nl)} ^{(fr)}		Mons	place du Parc n° 15	50.458274°N 3.951536°E	53053-CLT-0124-01	Huis: gevels en daken
House: walls and roofs ^{(nl)} ^{(fr)}		Mons	place du Parc n° 16a	50.458325°N 3.951579°E	53053-CLT-0125-01	Huis: gevels en daken
House: walls and roofs ^{(nl)} ^{(fr)}		Mons	place du Parc n° 16b	50.458371°N 3.951611°E	53053-CLT-0126-01	Huis: gevels en daken
House: walls and roofs ^{(nl)} ^{(fr)}		Mons	place du Parc n° 19	50.458706°N 3.952008°E	53053-CLT-0127-01	Huis: gevels en daken
House: walls and roofs ^{(nl)} ^{(fr)}		Mons	place du Parc n° 20	50.458712°N 3.952297°E	53053-CLT-0128-01	Huis: gevels en daken
House: walls and roofs ^{(nl)} ^{(fr)}		Mons	place du Parc n° 22	50.458739°N 3.952768°E	53053-CLT-0129-01	Huis: gevels en daken
House: walls and roofs ^{(nl)} ^{(fr)}		Mons	place du Parc n° 26-30	50.457987°N 3.951244°E	53053-CLT-0130-01	Huis: gevels en daken
House: walls and roofs ^{(nl)} ^{(fr)}		Mons	place du Parc n° 40	50.458293°N 3.950913°E	53053-CLT-0131-01	Huis: gevels en daken
House: walls and roofs ^{(nl)} ^{(fr)}		Mons	place du Parc n° 42	50.458354°N 3.950832°E	53053-CLT-0132-01	Huis: gevels en daken
House: walls and roofs ^{(nl)} ^{(fr)}		Mons	place du Parc n° 48	50.458407°N 3.950723°E	53053-CLT-0133-01	Huis: gevels en daken
Walls of the old castle of the Count, the keeper's house and cellars ^{(nl)} ^{(fr)}		Mons		50.454512°N 3.949678°E	53053-CLT-0134-01	Muren van het oude kasteel van de graaf, de conciërgerie en de kelders
Former Convent of the Carmes Dechausses: main building and wings (facades and roofs) ^{(nl)} ^{(fr)}		Mons	rue des Soeurs noires n° 4	50.449866°N 3.952145°E	53053-CLT-0135-01	Voormalig klooster van de Carmes Déchaussés: hoofdgebouw en vleugels (gevels en daken)
Ensemble of the facades and roofs of the barracks Major Sabbe (formerly barracks Guillaume) ^{(nl)} ^{(fr)}		Mons	rue des Soeurs Noires en rue de la Trouille	50.449620°N 3.951753°E	53053-CLT-0136-01	Ensemble van de gevels en daken van de kazerne Major Sabbe (voorheen kazerne Guillaume)
Portal ^{(nl)} ^{(fr)}		Mons	rue des Dominicains, n° 32	50.457218°N 3.950649°E	53053-CLT-0137-01	Portaal
House and wall from the 12th century ^{(nl)} ^{(fr)}		Mons	rue Cronque n° 3	50.454315°N 3.950921°E	53053-CLT-0138-01	Huis en muur uit de 12e eeuw
House facades, roofs and cladding ^{(nl)} ^{(fr)}		Mons	rue Marguerite Bervoets n° 17	50.454956°N 3.948985°E	53053-CLT-0139-01	Huis: gevels, daken en bekleding
Floor located on the grounds of the college of fine arts in the state, the former royal lyceum Marguerite Bervoets ^{(nl)} ^{(fr)}		Mons	rue Marguerite Bervoets, n° 8	50.455273°N 3.950042°E	53053-CLT-0140-01	Vloer gelegen op het terrein van het college van beeldende kunst van de staat, het voormalige koninklijke lyceum Marguerite Bervoets
State Archives, former monastery of the Visitandines: facades and roof ^{(nl)} ^{(fr)}		Mons	place du Parc n° 23	50.458317°N 3.953444°E	53053-CLT-0141-01	Staatsarchieven, voormalig klooster van de Visitandines: gevels en dak
Building called "Hôtel du Blanc Levrier": facade ^{(nl)} ^{(fr)}		Mons	Grand Place n° 34	50.453800°N 3.951881°E	53053-CLT-0142-01	Gebouw genaamd "Hôtel du Blanc Lévrier": voorgevel
House: extension of classification: and the whole rear of the roof ^{(nl)} ^{(fr)}		Mons	Grand-Place n°8	50.454362°N 3.952673°E	53053-CLT-0143-01	Huis: uitbreiding van classificatie: achtergevel en de totaliteit van het dak
House: extension of classification: and the whole rear of the roof ^{(nl)} ^{(fr)}		Mons	Grand-Place n°7	50.454312°N 3.952607°E	53053-CLT-0144-01	Huis: uitbreiding van classificatie: achtergevel en de totaliteit van het dak
House: extension of classification: and the whole rear of the roof ^{(nl)} ^{(fr)}		Mons	Grand-Place n°6	50.454228°N 3.952528°E	53053-CLT-0145-01	
House: extension of classification: and the whole rear of the roof ^{(nl)} ^{(fr)}		Mons	Grand-Place n°5	50.454181°N 3.952478°E	53053-CLT-0146-01	
House: extension of classification: totality of the roof and gable ^{(nl)} ^{(fr)}		Mons	Grand-Place n°4	50.454133°N 3.952440°E	53053-CLT-0147-01	Huis: uitbreiding van classificatie: totaliteit van het dak en en puntgevel
House facades, gables and totality of the roof of the building, Cour de l'Âne Barré ^{(nl)} ^{(fr)}		Mons	Cour de l'Âne Barré	50.454273°N 3.952694°E	53053-CLT-0148-01	Huis: gevels, puntgevels en totaliteit van het dak van het gebouw, Cour de l'Âne Barré
Forests of "Bois du Gard" and "Bois du Quartet" ^{(nl)} ^{(fr)}		Mons		50.492332°N 3.986587°E	53053-CLT-0149-01	Bos van Gard en van Quarte
Terril No. 1 ^{(nl)} ^{(fr)}		Mons	chaussée du Roeulx en Rue E. Jambe	50.469322°N 4.049497°E	53053-CLT-0150-01	Terril n° 1
House: walls, roof and gable windows ^{(nl)} ^{(fr)}		Mons	rue de la Couronne n° s 2-4	50.452843°N 3.951330°E	53053-CLT-0151-01	Huis: gevels, dak en dakramen
House: walls, roof and gable windows ^{(nl)} ^{(fr)}		Mons	rue de la Couronne n° s 5-7	50.452774°N 3.951748°E	53053-CLT-0152-01	Huis: gevels, dak en dakramen
House: walls, roof and gable windows ^{(nl)} ^{(fr)}		Mons	rue de la Couronne n° s 10-12	50.452787°N 3.951440°E	53053-CLT-0153-01	Huis: gevels, dak en dakramen
House: walls, roof and gable windows ^{(nl)} ^{(fr)}		Mons	rue de la Couronne n° 16	50.452689°N 3.951568°E	53053-CLT-0155-01	Huis: gevels, dak en dakramen
House: walls, roof and gable windows ^{(nl)} ^{(fr)}		Mons	rue de la Couronne n° s 20-22	50.452658°N 3.951739°E	53053-CLT-0156-01	Huis: gevels, dak en dakramen
Rue de la Couronne and adjacent parcels ^{(nl)} ^{(fr)}		Mons		50.452955°N 3.951145°E	53053-CLT-0157-01	Rue de la Couronne en aangrenzende percelen
House facades and roof ^{(nl)} ^{(fr)}		Mons	rue de Bertaimont n° 7	50.448905°N 3.949282°E	53053-CLT-0158-01	Huis: gevels en dak
House facades and roof ^{(nl)} ^{(fr)}		Mons	rue de Bertaimont n° 9	50.448834°N 3.949242°E	53053-CLT-0159-01	Huis: gevels en dak
House facades and roof ^{(nl)} ^{(fr)}		Mons	rue de Bertaimont n° 17	50.448617°N 3.949162°E	53053-CLT-0160-01	Huis: gevels en dak
House facades and roof ^{(nl)} ^{(fr)}		Mons	rue de Bertaimont n° 31	50.448240°N 3.949021°E	53053-CLT-0161-01	Huis: gevels en dak
House facades and roof ^{(nl)} ^{(fr)}		Mons	rue de Bertaimont n° 33	50.448135°N 3.948983°E	53053-CLT-0162-01	Huis: gevels en dak
Atheneum, formerly the Abbey of Saint-Ghislain, and the chapel (facades, roofs), interior elements: staircase, two fireplaces, wood paneling, in the chapel: gate ^{(nl)} ^{(fr)}		Mons	rue Fétis n°s 1-3	50.452638°N 3.945521°E	53053-CLT-0163-01	Atheneum, vroeger de thuishaven van de abdij van Saint-Ghislain, en de kapel (gevels, daken), interieurelementen: trap, twee open haarden, houten panelen, in de kapel: hekwerk
House facades, roofs and interior part ^{(nl)} ^{(fr)}		Mons	rue de la chaussée n° 43	50.452805°N 3.950972°E	53053-CLT-0164-01	Huis: gevels, daken en deel interieur
Old slaughterhouse: facades and roofs ^{(nl)} ^{(fr)}		Mons	rue de la Trouille	50.448776°N 3.951487°E	53053-CLT-0165-01	Oud slachthuis: gevels en daken
Facades and roofs of the monastery of the Black Sisters: portal, Chapels and Convent ^{(nl)} ^{(fr)}		Mons	rue des Soeurs Noires	50.449840°N 3.950957°E	53053-CLT-0166-01	Gevels en daken van het klooster van de Zwarte Zusters: portaal, kappelen en klooster
Facades and roofs of two wings called "Hospice Glepin" Bonne Maison de Bouzanton: extension of classification ^{(nl)} ^{(fr)}		Mons		50.448892°N 3.946166°E	53053-CLT-0167-01	Gevels en daken van twee vleugels genaamd "Hospice Glépin" van Bonne Maison de Bouzanton: uitbreiding van classificatie
Walls and gates to hospice Glepin ^{(nl)} ^{(fr)}		Mons		50.448895°N 3.946061°E	53053-CLT-0168-01	Muren en poorten om hospice Glépin
Hôtel de Maître: facades and roofs, except the side of the building to the street rue des Groseilliers, two interior stairwells ^{(nl)} ^{(fr)}		Mons	rue des Groseilliers n° 27	50.454803°N 3.958593°E	53053-CLT-0170-01	Hôtel de maître: gevels en daken, met uitzondering van de zijkant van het gebouw naar de straat rue des Groseilliers, interieur van twee trappenhuizen
Hôtel de gages: totality, and the cobbled courtyard and portico ^{(nl)} ^{(fr)}		Mons	rue d'Enghien 18	50.454949°N 3.951162°E	53053-CLT-0172-01	Hôtel de gages: totaliteit, en de geplaveide binnenplaats en portiek
Bois de Havré, crossed by the road chaussée du Roeulx ^{(nl)} ^{(fr)}		Mons		50.460695°N 4.002999°E	53053-CLT-0173-01	Bos van Havré, doorkruist door de weg chaussée du Roeulx
Organs of the Church of Saint Remi ^{(nl)} ^{(fr)}		Mons		50.436250°N 3.923547°E	53053-CLT-0174-01	
Grand Hospice: facade and roof ^{(nl)} ^{(fr)}		Mons	Place du Béguinage n° 16	50.449563°N 3.944894°E	53053-CLT-0176-01	Grand Hospice: voorgevel en dak
Hôtel de Maître: entire roof including the cornice of wood at the back, street facade and the facade at the rear of the floor ^{(nl)} ^{(fr)}		Mons	rue de la Grande Triperie, n° 42	50.450465°N 3.951502°E	53053-CLT-0177-01	Hôtel de maître: gehele dak met inbegrip van de kroonlijst van hout aan de achterkant, straatgevel en de gevel aan de achterzijde van de verdieping
Totality of the roof, walls and stairs and honorable service stairs, and the roofs and facades of two neoclassical wings of the building ^{(nl)} ^{(fr)}		Mons	rue de la Grande Triperie n°s 44-46	50.450352°N 3.951522°E	53053-CLT-0178-01	Totaliteit van het dak, de gevels en de eervolle trap en diensttrap, evenals de daken en gevels van twee vleugels van neoklassieke bijgebouwen van het gebouw
Former Hotel Marin Thieusies: facades, roofs and upholstery, stairs and service stairs ^{(nl)} ^{(fr)}		Mons	rue d'Havré, cour n° 32	50.453378°N 3.953903°E	53053-CLT-0179-01	Voormalig Hôtel Marin de Thieusies: gevels, daken en bekleding, trap en diensttrap
House: main facade and roof ^{(nl)} ^{(fr)}		Mons	rue de Nimy n°51	50.456880°N 3.954875°E	53053-CLT-0181-01	Huis: hoofdgevel en dak
House facade and roof ^{(nl)} ^{(fr)}		Mons	rue de la Clef n° 9	50.453592°N 3.952812°E	53053-CLT-0186-01	Huis: gevel en dak
Facades and roofs of the building ^{(nl)} ^{(fr)}		Mons	op de hoek van rue des 4 Fils Aymon n° 1 en rue de Nimy n° 43	50.456486°N 3.954475°E	53053-CLT-0187-01	Gevels en daken van het gebouw
Former public bathing house: facade and roof ^{(nl)} ^{(fr)}		Mons	rue de Malplaquet n° 12	50.448012°N 3.944690°E	53053-CLT-0188-01	Voormalige Bains-Douches: gevel en dak
Chapel of Saint-Antoine en Barbenfosse and the wells, and cadastral parcel containing the access ^{(nl)} ^{(fr)}		Mons		50.464155°N 4.015524°E	53053-CLT-0189-01	Kapel Saint-Antoine en Barbefosse en de putten, en dat kadastrale perceel met daarop de toegangsweg
Renaissance House: gables, roofs and cladding ^{(nl)} ^{(fr)}		Mons	aan de achterzijde van rue de la Halle n°s 1-5 en toegankelijk via rue Jean Lescarts	50.452304°N 3.954535°E	53053-CLT-0191-01	Huis Renaissance: gevelsm daken en bekleding
Cemetery: old part 1784, characteristic tombs, processional ("chemin de la Procession") ^{(nl)} ^{(fr)}		Mons		50.460867°N 3.975573°E	53053-CLT-0192-01	Begraafplaats: oude deel uit 1784, karakteristieke tombes, processieweg ('chemin de la Procession')
Protection area of the parcels to the water machine ^{(nl)} ^{(fr)}		Mons		50.449793°N 3.956576°E	53053-CLT-0195-01	Beschermingszone van de percelen om de watermachine
Facades on Roosevelt Square and rue de la Houssière, and roofs of the old building of the Banque Nationale, and setting of conservation ^{(nl)} ^{(fr)}		Mons		50.453750°N 3.945141°E	53053-CLT-0198-01	Gevels aan square Roosevelt en rue de la Houssière, en daken van het oude gebouw van de Banque Nationale, en instelling beschermingszone
The facades (rue d'Enghien and rue Cronque) and roofs (slopes on these two streets and the garden at the rear), and various interior elements on the ground floor of the building ^{(nl)} ^{(fr)}		Mons	rue d'Enghien 19	50.454563°N 3.951008°E	53053-CLT-0199-01	De gevels (rue d'Enghien en rue Cronque) en daken (hellingen aan deze twee straten en de tuin aan de achterzijde), en diverse interieur-elementen op de begane grond van het gebouw
Certain parts of the Polytechnic Faculty of Mons ^{(nl)} ^{(fr)}		Mons	rue Houdain 9	50.451545°N 3.953253°E	53053-CLT-0200-01	Bepaalde delen van de polytechnische faculteit van Mons
Site of the Abbey of Belian ^{(nl)} ^{(fr)}		Mons		50.422694°N 3.948995°E	53053-CLT-0201-01	Site van de abdij van Bélian
The underground quarries of Malogne ^{(nl)} ^{(fr)}		Mons		50.428002°N 3.912072°E	53053-CLT-0203-01	
Certain parts of the coal mines on the territory of the former municipality Flénu ^{(nl)} ^{(fr)}		Mons		50.436694°N 3.892789°E	53053-CLT-0205-01	Bepaalde delen van de kolenmijnen op het territorium van de voormalige section Flénu
Former Abbey of Saint-Denis-en-Brocqueroie: entrance hall, tithe barn, library and secondary portal ^{(nl)} ^{(fr)}		Mons	rue de la Filature	50.492970°N 4.019646°E	53053-CLT-0208-01	Oude abdij van Saint-Denis-en-Brocqueroie: entreeportaal, tiendschuur, bibliotheek en secundair portaal
Facades, roofs and stairs of the building ^{(nl)} ^{(fr)}		Mons	rue des Soeurs noires 8	50.449683°N 3.952620°E	53053-CLT-0209-01	Gevels, daken en trap van het gebouw
Facades, roofs and cladding of the hall and three steps of Hôtel Letellier ^{(nl)} ^{(fr)}		Mons	rue de la Grande Triperie, 26 à Mons	50.451160°N 3.951485°E	53053-CLT-0211-01	Gevels, daken en bekleding van de hal en drie trappen van Hôtel Letellier
House: façades to the courtyard and garden, trim, roofs, stairs and salon in 18th century style ^{(nl)} ^{(fr)}		Mons	rue J. Lescarts n°15.	50.451951°N 3.955266°E	53053-CLT-0212-01	Huis: gevels aan de binnenplaats en tuin, bekleding, daken, trap en salon in 18e-eeuwse stijl
House facade and roof ^{(nl)} ^{(fr)}		Mons	rue de Nimy, n°53	50.456912°N 3.954899°E	53053-CLT-0213-01	Huis: voorgevel en dak
House facade and roof ^{(nl)} ^{(fr)}		Mons	rue des 4 Fils Aymon, n° 14/16 à l'exception de la toiture du n° 16.	50.456928°N 3.953497°E	53053-CLT-0214-01	Huis: voorgevel en dak
Buffet and organ of the church Saint-Nicolas-and-Havre ^{(nl)} ^{(fr)}		Mons		50.454377°N 3.957146°E	53053-PEX-0001-01	
Archaeological site of Champ to Cailloux ^{(nl)} ^{(fr)}		Mons		50.417204°N 3.970117°E	53053-PEX-0002-01	Archeologische site van Champ te Cailloux
Ensemble of the collegiate church of Sainte-Waudru except instrumental part of the organ ^{(nl)} ^{(fr)}		Mons		50.453471°N 3.947658°E	53053-PEX-0003-01	Ensemble van de collegiale kerk Sainte-Waudru, uitgezonderd instrumentaal deel van het orgel
Belfry of Mons ^{(nl)} ^{(fr)}		Mons		50.454091°N 3.950023°E	53053-PEX-0004-01	Belfort van Bergen
Town hall ^{(nl)} ^{(fr)}		Mons		50.454896°N 3.952188°E	53053-PEX-0005-01	Raadhuis
Tower Valenciennoise ^{(nl)} ^{(fr)}		Mons		50.458429°N 3.958665°E	53053-PEX-0006-01	Toren Valenciennoise
Archaeological site of the old count's castle ^{(nl)} ^{(fr)}		Mons		50.454764°N 3.948709°E	53053-PEX-0007-01	Archeologische site van het oude grafelijke kasteel
Facade of building "Hôtel du Blanc Levrier" ^{(nl)} ^{(fr)}		Mons		50.453800°N 3.951881°E	53053-PEX-0008-01	Voorgevel van gebouw "Hôtel du Blanc Lévrier"
Old quarry Malogne ^{(nl)} ^{(fr)}		Mons		50.428002°N 3.912072°E	53053-PEX-0009-01	

== See also ==
- List of protected heritage sites in Hainaut (province)
- Mons
