= Siege of Valenciennes (1793) =

18th-century battle

Coordinates: 50.3581°N 3.5233°E

- Part of the Flanders campaign of the War of the First Coalition
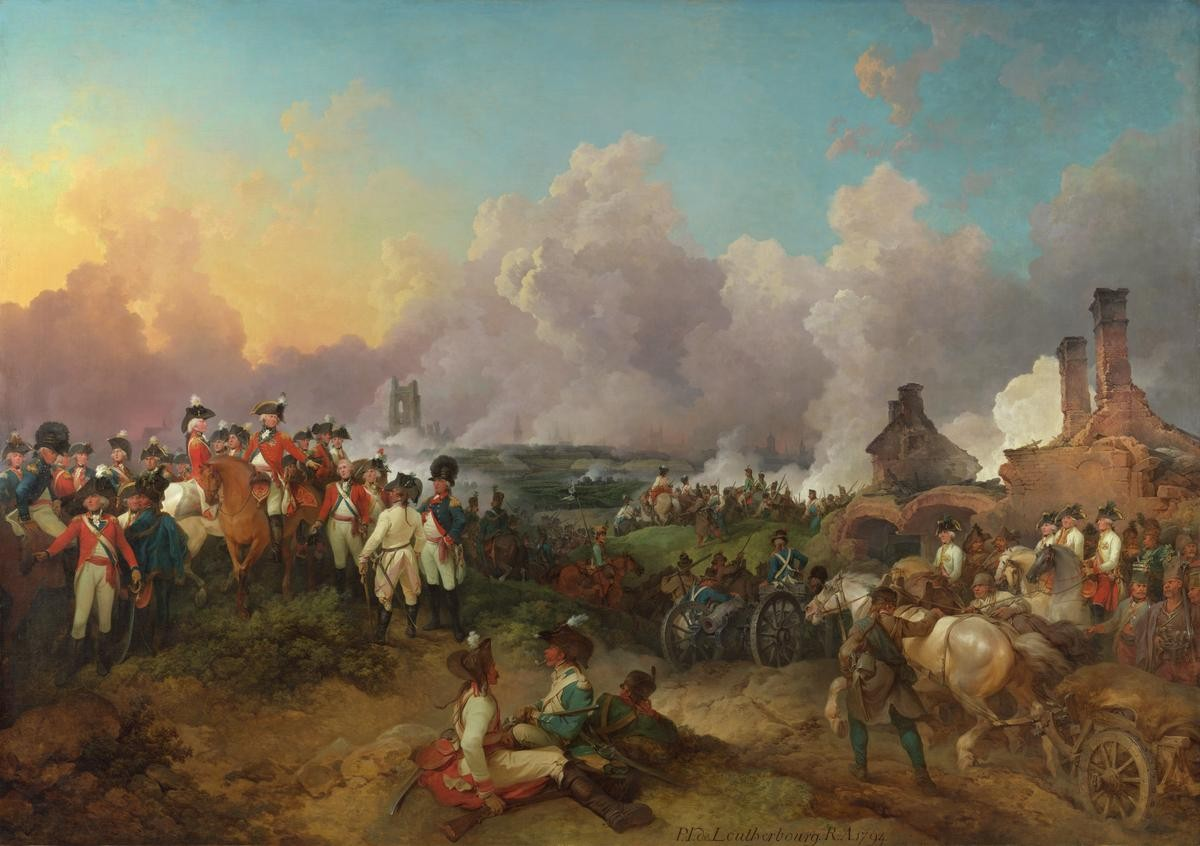
- The Grand Attack on Valenciennes; Philip James de Loutherbourg, 1794
Date	25 May to 27 July 1793
Location	Valenciennes, France
Result	Coalition victory

Belligerents
Great Britain; Austria; Hanover	France

Commanders and leaders
Frederick Augustus; Joseph de Ferraris	Jean Ferrand

Strength
80,000	10,000

Casualties and losses
Unknown	Unknown

The siege of Valenciennes took place between 13 June and 28 July 1793, during the Flanders campaign of the War of the First Coalition. The French garrison under Jean Henri Becays Ferrand was blockaded by part of the army of Prince Josias of Saxe-Coburg-Saalfeld, commanded by the Prince Frederick, Duke of York and Albany. Valenciennes fell on 28 July, resulting in an Allied victory.

== Background ==
Following the defeat of the French Republican armies at Neerwinden, the Allied army under the Prince of Coburg recovered much of the Austrian Netherlands and began besieging Condé-sur-l'Escaut, while the demoralised French army's attempts to relieve the fortress in actions at Saint-Amand and Raismes were driven back. By mid-May Coburg was reinforced to a strength approaching 90,000, which allowed the Allies to drive the French from an entrenched camp in the Battle of Famars on 23 May, and lay siege to Valenciennes.

Many of the French who had been driven from Famars took refuge in the fortified town of Valenciennes, raising its garrison considerably.

Coburg selected the recently arrived Duke of York to lead the siege operations with his own command and 14,000 Austrians, while Austrian General Joseph de Ferraris was attached to supervise the technical aspects. The British government were surprised by this, the British were inexperienced in heavy siege warfare and lacked equipment, it was even suspected the Austrians had some sinister reasons for choosing York York's Chief of Engineers Colonel James Moncrief believed that the place could be carried by an assault without the need for a long protracted investment, but Ferraris would hear none of it and insisted on a formal siege of trenches following full procedures.

== The siege ==
It took a fortnight before heavy guns could be brought forward, but on 13 June trenches were finally dug and the siege began. 25,000 men undertook the siege, protected by a covering army of 30,000.

The siege operations of the Austrians proceeded at a slow pace, much to the frustration of York. Fitzgerald wrote "He sharply remonstrated with them, and in return was reproved for his excessive zeal".

On 26 July, the main hornworks on the Eastern side were stormed by three columns, one of them of British troops (companies of the Guards supported by part of Abercromby's brigade). York's chief of staff Murray wrote: "The keeping of the hornwork was entirely owing to us putting the Duke of York at the head. Repeated orders were sent by General Ferraris to evacuate it. Knowing the Duke's wishes on that head, convinced of the folly of such a measure, and strongly supported by Colonel Moncrieff, I gave positive orders to the contrary, which was approved in the fullest manner by His Royal Highness who was at that time at a redoubt a little to the rear".

Following the fall of the hornwork Valenciennes surrendered on 28 July, the garrison being allowed to leave with the honours of war minus their weapons and munitions.

== French garrison ==
The French regulars consisted of two battalions of the 29th (ex-Dauphin) Line Infantry Regiment and one battalion each of the 75th (ex-Royal-Comtois) and 87th (ex-Dillon) Regiments. The volunteers were the 1st Battalions of the Charente, Côte-d'Or, Côte-d'Or Grenadiers, Deux-Sèvres, Gravilliers, Loire-et-Cher, Mayenne-et-Loire, Meurthe, Nièvre, Paris Grenadiers and Seine-Inférieur National Guards, the 2nd Battalion of Eure, 3rd Battalion of Valenciennes and 4th Battalion of Ardennes. There were 400 horsemen of the 24th and 25th Dragoon Regiments, 350 gunners of the 3rd and 6th Artillery Regiments, 250 civilian volunteers of Valenciennes, 500 men from eight Paris companies and one Douai company, 200 firemen, 50 miners and 296 miscellaneous soldiers. The infantry battalions counted between 400 and 600 soldiers each.

== Aftermath ==
York was proclaimed as a saviour by the population of the town, which trampled the tricolour underfoot and declared him King of France.
