= Jean Henri Becays Ferrand =

General in the French Revolutionary Wars (1736–1805)

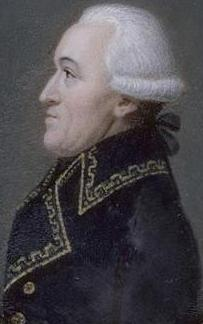
- Jean Henri Becays Ferrand
- Born: 10 September 1736; Lacaussade, France
- Died: 28 November 1805 (aged 69) Levallois-Perret, France
- Allegiance: France
- Branch: Infantry
- Service years: 1747–1793
- Rank: General of Division
- Conflicts: War of the Austrian Succession; Battle of Lauffeld; Siege of Bergen op Zoom; Seven Years' War; Battle of Kloster Kampen; French Revolutionary Wars; Battle of Jemappes; Siege of Valenciennes
- Other work: Prefect of Meuse-Inférieure

Jean Henri Becays Ferrand or Jean Marie Begais Ferrand de la Caussade (10 September 1736 – 28 November 1805) became a French general officer early in the French Revolutionary Wars and led troops during two early actions. From a noble family, he was enrolled in the French Royal Army as an officer in the Normandie Infantry Regiment. At the age of ten, he fought at Lauffeld and Bergen op Zoom in the War of the Austrian Succession. In 1760 during the Seven Years' War, he was badly wounded at Kloster Kampen. For distinguished service, he was promoted to captain.

Appointed colonel in 1791, Ferrand was made the commandant of the fortress of Valenciennes the next year. Promoted to maréchal de camp, he led the left wing at the Battle of Jemappes. He was elevated in rank to general of division in May 1793. Ordered by his turncoat superior Charles François Dumouriez to surrender Condé-sur-l'Escaut and Valenciennes, Ferrand refused to carry out his instructions. After the two-month long Siege of Valenciennes, he surrendered the city to Prince Frederick, Duke of York and Albany. Sometime after being paroled, he was imprisoned by the Committee of Public Safety for being from the old nobility. He avoided the guillotine and was released when the government of Maximilien Robespierre was overthrown. Napoleon Bonaparte later named him Prefect of Meuse-Inférieure but he retired in 1804, pleading bad health.

His surname is one of the names inscribed under the Arc de Triomphe, on Column 4, but probably refers to General Jacques Ferrand.
