= The Grand Attack on Valenciennes =

Painting by Philip James De Loutherbourg

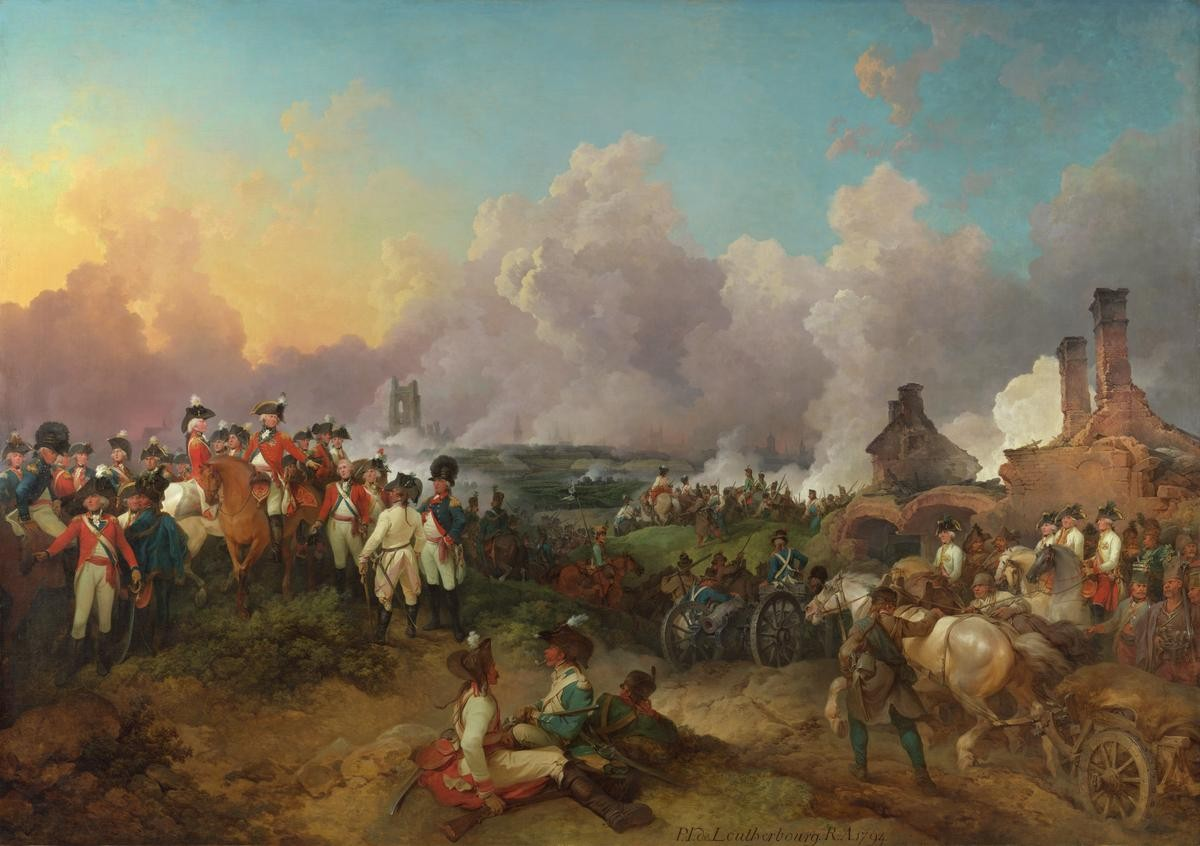
- Artist: Philip James de Loutherbourg.
- Year: 1794
- Type: Oil on canvas, History painting
- Dimensions: 262.6 cm × 372.2 cm (103.4 in × 146.5 in)
- Location: Tate Britain; London

The Grand Attack on Valenciennes by the Combined Armies is an oil on canvas history painting by the French-born British artist Philip James de Loutherbourg, from 1794.

== History and description ==
It depicts the gathering of Allies Generals during the Siege of Valenciennes in September 1793 during the Flanders Campaign of the French Revolutionary War. The Duke of York, second son of George III of Great Britain, commanded the coalition troops during the campaign . The taking of Valenciennes was a notable early Allied victory of the War of the First Coalition, but quickly the tide turned and the forces of Revolutionary France overran much of modern Belgium and in 1795 defeated and occupied the Dutch Republic. The campaign gave rise to the nursery rhyme The Grand Old Duke of York.

Along with the Duke of York, the other figures depicted include the Austrian general Prince Josias, Ernest Augustus, Ernest, Duke of Cumberland, the Prince of Orange, Ralph Abercromby, Gerard Lake, Count Wallmoden, William Congreve and the Duke of Saxe-Coburg, the grandfather of Queen Victoria.

It was commissioned by the engraver Valentine Green who hired Loutherbourg and James Gillray to accompany the campaign. Gillray, best known as a satirical caricaturist, was employed to produce images of uniforms and equipment. Loutherbourg took nine months to complete the painting, which was first exhibited at Buckingham House, before moving to Robert Bowyer's gallery at Schomberg House, in Pall Mall. The painting is today in the collection of the Tate Britain, in Pimlico, having been allocated to the gallery following its acceptance in lieu by the British government in 2020. As a pendant painting, Loutherbourg produced a depiction of a notable British naval victory The Glorious First of June.

== Bibliography ==
- O'Rourke, Stephanie. Art, Science, and the Body in Early Romanticism. Cambridge University Press, 2021.
- Pressly, William L. The French Revolution as Blasphemy: Johan Zoffany's Paintings of the Massacre at Paris University of California Press, 2023.
