= Siege of Namur (1792) =

1792 siege during the War of the First Coalition

- Part of the Low Countries theatre of the War of the First Coalition
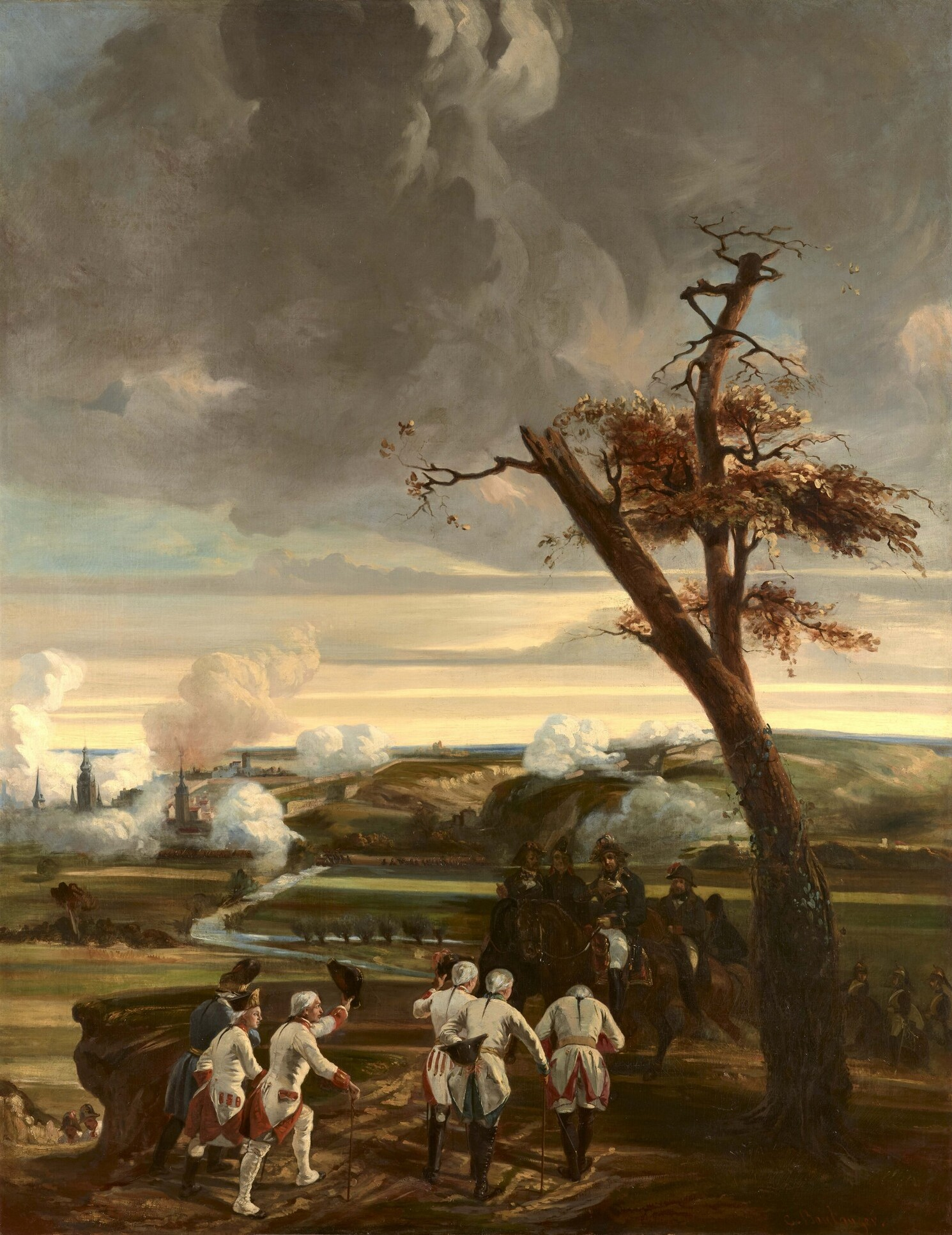
- Capture of the castles of Namur, 2 December 1792; Clément Boulanger, 1836
Date	21 November – 2 December 1792
Location	Namur, Austrian Netherlands
Result	French victory

Belligerents
France	Holy Roman Empire

Commanders and leaders
(France) Count of Valence	(Holy Roman Empire) Johann von Moitelle

Strength
35,000 men	2,300 men

The siege of Namur took place from 21 November to 2 December 1792, during the Flanders campaign of the War of the First Coalition. The French Army of the Ardennes under the Count of Valence captured the city which was then part of the Austrian Netherlands.

== Background ==
After the Battle of Jemappes, the Count of Valence divided his forces and sent 35,000 men towards the Meuse. A detachment entered Liège on November 28 under the acclamations of the inhabitants; the rest was sent to undertake the siege of Namur.

Due to the proximity of the Austrian army under Johann Peter Beaulieu, Valence devoted this operation to the Army of the Ardennes which would be reinforced by the Harville division. Beaulieu, avoiding battle with the Army of the Ardennes, fell back towards the Aische Forest. Three French brigades encamped around the citadel of Namur awaiting the arrival of their artillery from the Fortress of Charlemont near Givet. The strategist Antoine-Henri Jomini pointed out that by advancing more quickly, Valence could have trapped the entire Austrian army which he did not, allowing Beaulieu and his force to escape.

== Battle ==
On 21 November, the main town opened its doors and surrendered; however the Austrians still held the citadel with 2,300 well-supplied men. The trench was opened on November 27 and the bombardment began using the artillery that arrived from Givet. Under heavy French bombardment, the citadel capitulated on December 2 and Valence took the garrison prisoner.

== Literature ==
- Jomini, Antoine de (1820). Histoire critique et militaire des guerres de la Révolution: Campagne de 1792 (in French). Paris..

Preceded by Battle of Jemappes	French Revolution: Revolutionary campaigns Siege of Namur	Succeeded by War of the First Coalition
