= Ormoy, Haute-Saône =

Ormoy
- Commune
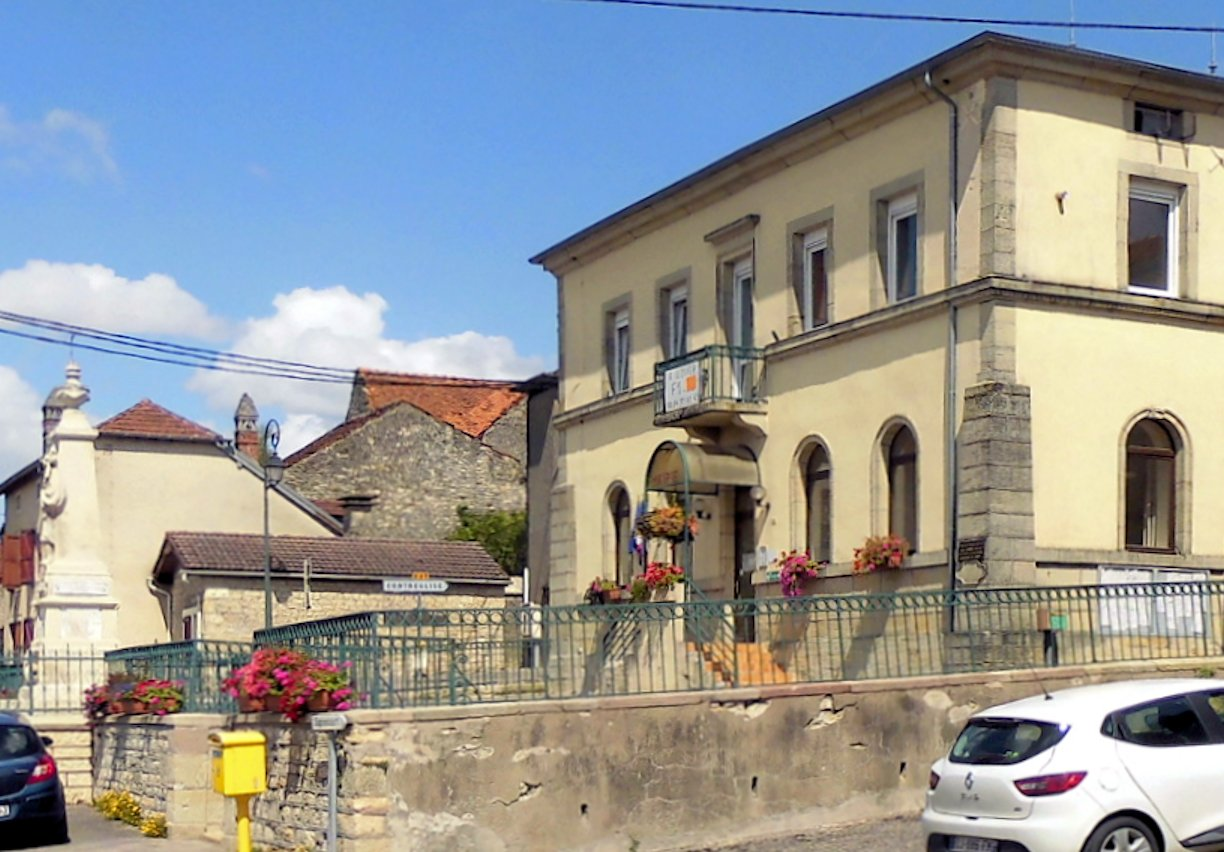
- The town hall in Ormoy
- Location of Ormoy
- Location within France Location within Bourgogne-Franche-Comté
- Coordinates: 47°53′25″N 5°58′54″E
- Country: France
- Region: Bourgogne-Franche-Comté
- Department: Haute-Saône
- Arrondissement: Vesoul
- Canton: Jussey

Government
  - Mayor (2020–2026): Hubert Vernier
- Area^{1}: 19.54 km^{2} (7.54 sq mi)
- Highest elevation: 343 m (1,125 ft)
- Lowest elevation: 216 m (709 ft)
- Population (2023): 205
  - Density: 10.5/km^{2} (27.2/sq mi)
- Time zone: UTC+01:00 (CET)
  - Summer (DST): UTC+02:00 (CEST)
- INSEE/Postal code: 70399 /70500
- ^{1} French Land Register data, which excludes lakes, ponds, glaciers > 1 km^{2} (0.386 sq mi or 247 acres) and river estuaries.

Ormoy (French pronunciation: [ɔʁmwa]) is a commune in the Haute-Saône department in the region of Bourgogne-Franche-Comté in eastern France.

== See also ==
- Communes of the Haute-Saône department
