= Prince Frederick, Duke of York and Albany =

British prince (1763–1827)

Prince Frederick
- Duke of York and Albany
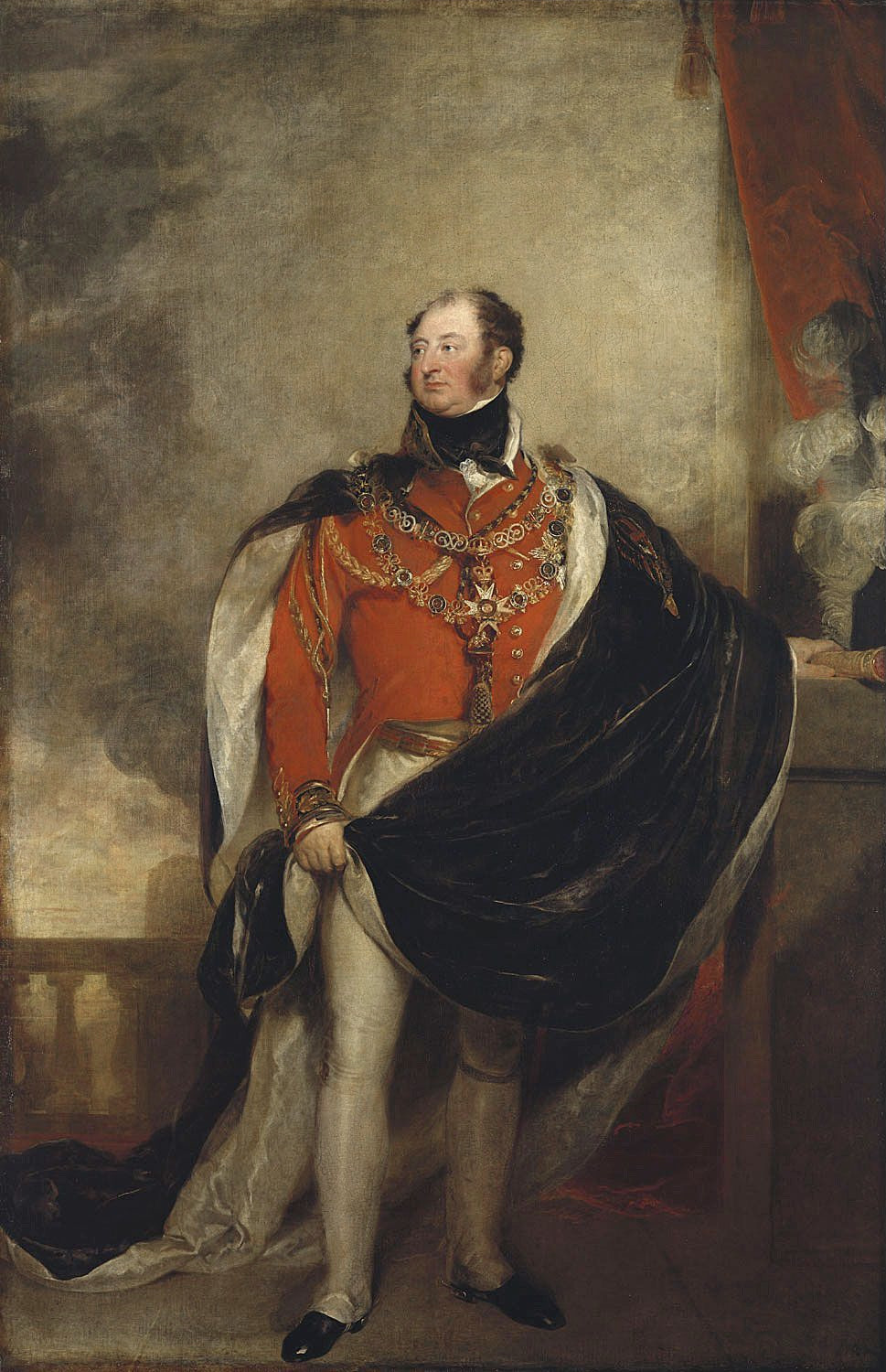
- Portrait of the Duke of York by Thomas Lawrence, 1816

Prince-Bishop of Osnabrück
- Reign: 27 February 1764 – 24 March 1803
- Born: 16 August 1763; St. James's Palace, London, England
- Died: 5 January 1827 (aged 63); Rutland House, London, England
- Burial: 20 January 1827; Royal Vault, St George's Chapel, Windsor Castle
- Spouse: Princess Frederica Charlotte of Prussia (m. 1791; died 1820)
Names
- Frederick Augustus
- House: Hanover
- Father: George III
- Mother: Charlotte of Mecklenburg-Strelitz
- Military career
- Allegiance: Great Britain; United Kingdom
- Branch: British Army
- Years of active service: 1780–1809; 1811–1827
- Rank: Field marshal
- Unit: Life Guards
- Commands: Commander-in-Chief of the Forces
- Conflicts: French Revolutionary Wars; War of the First Coalition; Flanders campaign; Battle of Raismes; Battle of Famars; Siege of Valenciennes (1793); Battle of Caesar's Camp; Battle of Lincelles; Siege of Dunkirk (1793); Battle of Hondschoote; Battle of Beaumont (1794); Battle of Willems; Battle of Courtrai (1794); Battle of Tourcoing; Battle of Tournay (1794); Battle of Boxtel; Battle of Puiflijk; Siege of Nijmegen (1794); War of the Second Coalition; Anglo-Russian invasion of Holland; Battle of Bergen (1799); Battle of Alkmaar (1799); Battle of Castricum; Napoleonic Wars

Prince Frederick, Duke of York and Albany (Frederick Augustus; 16 August 1763 – 5 January 1827), was the second son of George III, King of the United Kingdom and Hanover, and his consort Charlotte of Mecklenburg-Strelitz. A soldier by profession, from 1764 to 1803 he was Prince-Bishop of Osnabrück in the Holy Roman Empire. From the death of his father in 1820 until his own death in 1827, he was the heir presumptive to his elder brother, George IV, in both the United Kingdom of Great Britain and Ireland and the Kingdom of Hanover. Had he lived three more years, he would have become King of the United Kingdom and Hanover, rather than his younger brother, William IV.

Frederick was thrust into the British Army at a very early age and was appointed to high command at the age of thirty, when he was given command of a notoriously ineffectual campaign during the War of the First Coalition, a continental war following the French Revolution. Later, as Commander-in-Chief during the Napoleonic Wars, he oversaw the reorganisation of the British Army, establishing vital structural, administrative and recruiting reforms for which he is credited with having done "more for the army than any one man has done for it in the whole of its history".

== Early life ==
Frederick belonged to the House of Hanover. He was born on 16 August 1763, at St. James's Palace, London. His father was the reigning British monarch, King George III. His mother was Queen Charlotte (née Princess of Mecklenburg-Strelitz).

On 27 February 1764, when Frederick was six months old, he became Prince-Bishop of Osnabrück upon the death of Clemens August of Bavaria. The Peace of Westphalia stipulated that the city of Osnabrück would alternate between Catholic and Protestant rulers, with the Protestant bishops to be elected from the cadets of the House of Brunswick-Lüneburg. The bishopric of Osnabrück came with a substantial income, which he retained until the city was incorporated into Hanover in 1803 during the German mediatisation. He was appointed a Knight of the Most Honourable Order of the Bath on 30 December 1767 and a Knight of the Order of the Garter on 19 June 1771.

== Military career ==
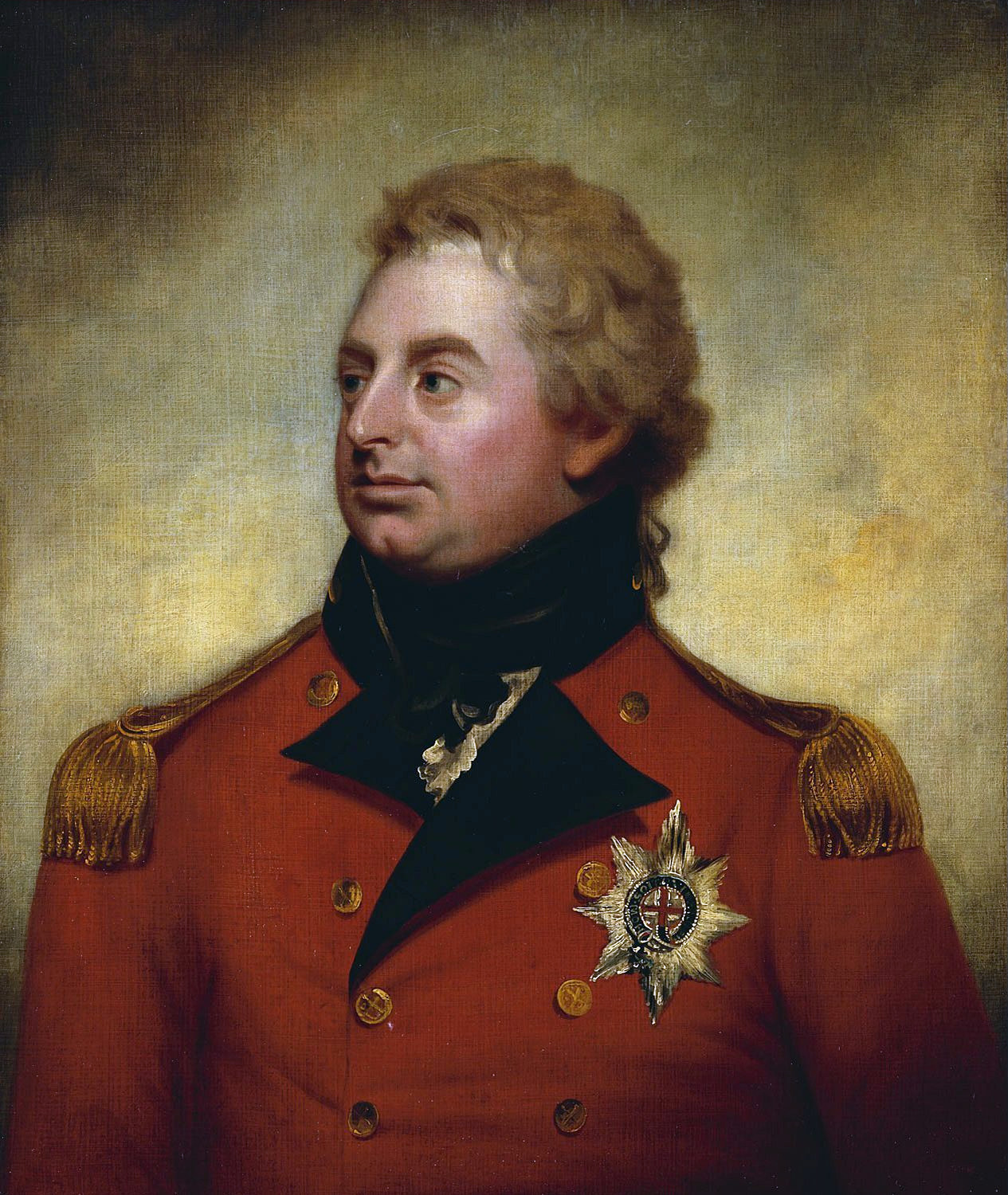
The Duke of York

George III decided that his second son would pursue an army career and had him gazetted colonel on 4 November 1780. From 1781 to 1787, Prince Frederick lived in Hanover, where he studied (along with his younger brothers, Prince Edward, Prince Ernest, Prince Augustus and Prince Adolphus) at the University of Göttingen. He was appointed colonel of the 2nd Horse Grenadier Guards (later 2nd Life Guards) on 26 March 1782 before being promoted to major-general on 20 November 1782. Promoted to lieutenant general on 27 October 1784, he was appointed colonel of the Coldstream Guards on 28 October 1784.

He was created Duke of York and Albany and Earl of Ulster on 27 November 1784 and became a member of the Privy Council. On his return to Great Britain, the Duke took his seat in the House of Lords, where, on 15 December 1788 during the Regency crisis, he opposed William Pitt's Regency Bill in a speech which was supposed to have been influenced by the Prince of Wales. On 26 May 1789 he took part in a duel with Colonel Charles Lennox, who had insulted him; Lennox missed, and Frederick refused to return fire.

=== Flanders ===
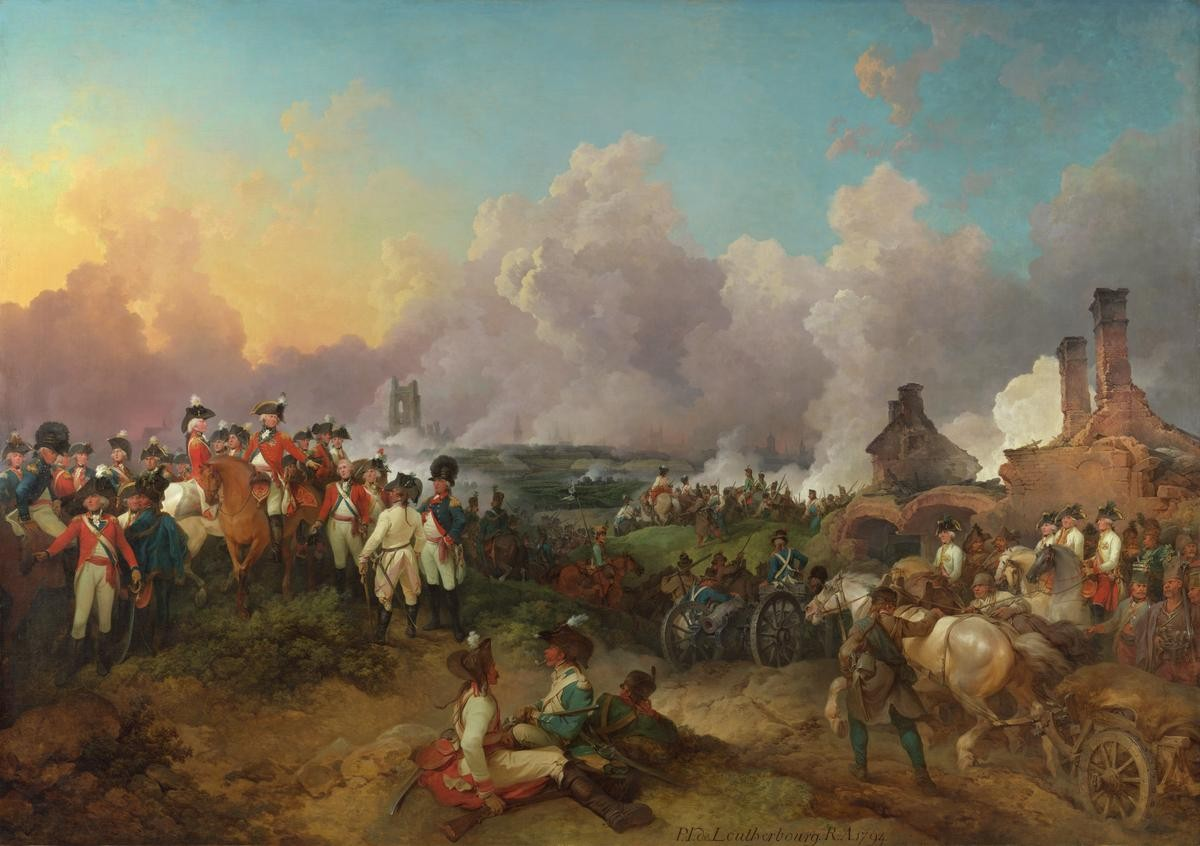
The Grand Attack on Valenciennes by Philip James de Loutherbourg, 1794. The Siege of Valenciennes was an early Allied success but the campaign soon turned against them.

On 12 April 1793, Frederick was promoted to full general. That year, he was sent to Flanders in command of the British contingent of Coburg's army destined for the invasion of France. Frederick and his command fought in the Flanders campaign under extremely trying conditions. He won several notable engagements, such as the Siege of Valenciennes in July 1793, but was defeated at the Battle of Hondschoote in September 1793. In the 1794 campaign he gained a notable success at the Battle of Beaumont in April and another at the Battle of Willems in May but was defeated at the Battle of Tourcoing later that month. The British army was evacuated through Bremen in April 1795.

=== Commander-in-Chief ===
After his return to Britain, his father George III promoted him to the rank of field marshal on 18 February 1795. On 3 April 1795, George appointed him effective Commander-in-Chief in succession to Lord Amherst although the title was not confirmed until three years later. He was also colonel of the 60th Regiment of Foot from 19 August 1797.

On appointment as Commander-in-Chief he immediately declared, reflecting on the Flanders Campaign of 1793–94, "that no officer should ever be subject to the same disadvantages under which he had laboured".

His second field command was with the army sent for the Anglo-Russian invasion of Holland in August 1799. On 7 September 1799, he was given the honorary title of Captain-General. Sir Ralph Abercromby and Admiral Sir Charles Mitchell, in charge of the vanguard, had succeeded in capturing some Dutch warships in Den Helder. However, following the Duke's arrival with the main body of the army, a number of disasters befell the allied forces, including shortage of supplies. On 17 October 1799, the Duke signed the Convention of Alkmaar, by which the allied expedition withdrew after giving up its prisoners. 1799 also saw Fort Frederick in South Africa named after him.

Frederick's military setbacks of 1799 were inevitable given his lack of experience as a field commander, the poor state of the British army at the time, and the conflicting military objectives of the protagonists. After this ineffectual campaign, Frederick was mocked, perhaps unfairly, in the rhyme "The Grand Old Duke of York":

The grand old Duke of York,
He had ten thousand men.
He marched them up to the top of the hill
And he marched them down again.
And when they were up, they were up.
And when they were down, they were down.
And when they were only halfway up,
They were neither up nor down.

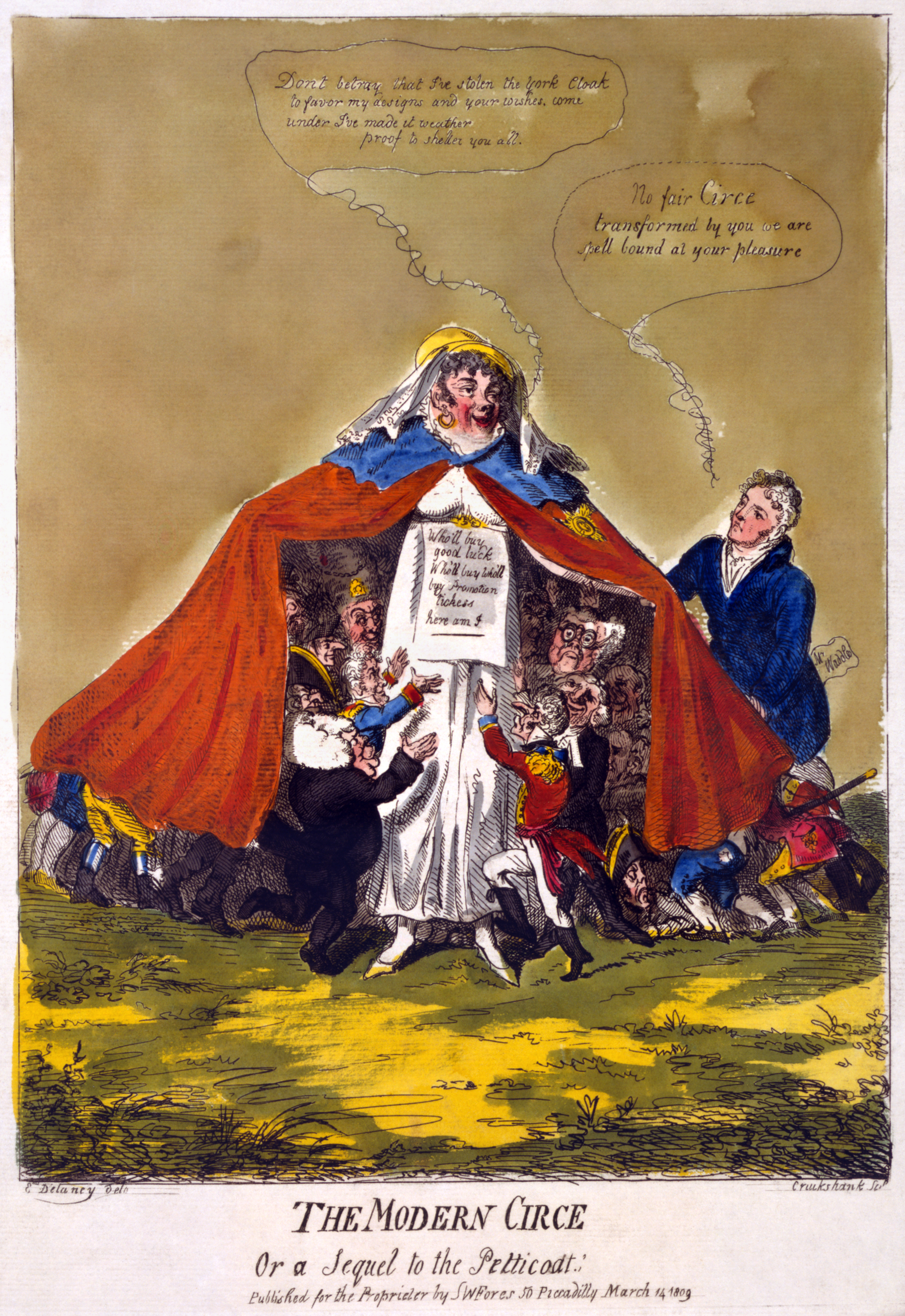
"The modern Circe or a sequel to the petticoat", caricature of Frederick's lover, Mary Anne Clarke by Isaac Cruikshank, 15 March 1809. The prince resigned as head of the British army ten days after the caricature's publication.

Frederick's experience in the Dutch campaign made a strong impression on him. That campaign, and the Flanders campaign, had demonstrated the numerous weaknesses of the British army after years of neglect. Frederick as Commander-in-Chief of the British army carried through a massive programme of reform. He was the person most responsible for the reforms that created the force which served in the Peninsular War. He was also in charge of the preparations against Napoleon's planned invasion of the United Kingdom in 1803. In the opinion of Sir John Fortescue, Frederick did "more for the army than any one man has done for it in the whole of its history".

In 1801 Frederick actively supported the foundation of the Royal Military College, Sandhurst, which promoted the professional, merit-based training of future commissioned officers.

In 1801 touched by the plight of children orphaned as a result of the Napoleonic wars, Frederick issued a Royal Warrant and laid the foundation stone in Chelsea to build the Royal Military Asylum (now known as the Duke of York's Headquarters) for orphaned children. In 1892 the Royal Military Asylum was renamed the Duke of York's Royal Military School. The school relocated to Dover, Kent in 1909.

On 14 September 1805 he was given the honorary title of Warden of Windsor Forest.

Frederick resigned as Commander-in-Chief on 25 March 1809, as the result of a scandal caused by the activities of his latest mistress, Mary Anne Clarke. Clarke was accused of illicitly selling army commissions under Frederick's aegis. A select committee of the House of Commons enquired into the matter. Parliament eventually acquitted Frederick of receiving bribes by 278 votes to 196. He nevertheless resigned because of the high tally against him. Two years later, it was revealed that Clarke had received payment for furniture from Frederick's disgraced chief accuser, Gwyllym Wardle, and the Prince Regent reappointed the exonerated Frederick as Commander-in-Chief on 29 May 1811. The Duke's relationship with Mary Anne Clarke is used by Mary Anne's descendant, Daphne du Maurier, in her historical novel Mary Anne.

== Residences ==
Frederick maintained a country residence at Oatlands near Weybridge, Surrey but he was seldom there, preferring to immerse himself in his administrative work at Horse Guards (the British army's headquarters) and, after hours, in London's high life, with its gaming tables: Frederick was perpetually in debt because of his excessive gambling on cards and racehorses. In 1826 his London residence was 8 South Audley Street, Mayfair, which had previously been occupied by his deceased sister-in-law Caroline of Brunswick.

Construction of a palatial London residence for Frederick, York House (later Lancaster House) commenced in 1825. Sir Robert Smirke was originally hired to design the house, until under the influence of the Duke's mistress the Duchess of Rutland, he was replaced by Benjamin Dean Wyatt who mainly designed the exterior. The house was only a shell when Frederick died in 1827. It is constructed from Bath stone, in a neo-classical style. The lease of the house was purchased from Frederick's executors by the 2nd Marquess of Stafford (later 1st Duke of Sutherland) and was under his direction that it was completed in 1838. It was known as Stafford House for almost a century thereafter.

== Heir presumptive ==
Following the unexpected death of his niece, Princess Charlotte of Wales, in 1817, Frederick became second in line to the throne, with a serious chance of inheriting it. In 1820, he became heir presumptive with the death of his father, George III.

== Death ==
Frederick died of dropsy and apparent cardiovascular disease at the home of the Duke of Rutland in Arlington Street, London, in 1827. After lying in state at the Chapel Royal in London, Frederick's remains were interred in St George's Chapel, Windsor Castle, following his funeral there. The chapel was so cold during the funeral, held at night in January, that the Foreign Secretary, George Canning, contracted rheumatic fever, becoming so ill that he thought he might not recover; Canning became Prime Minister that April, but died on 8 August the same year.

== Family ==
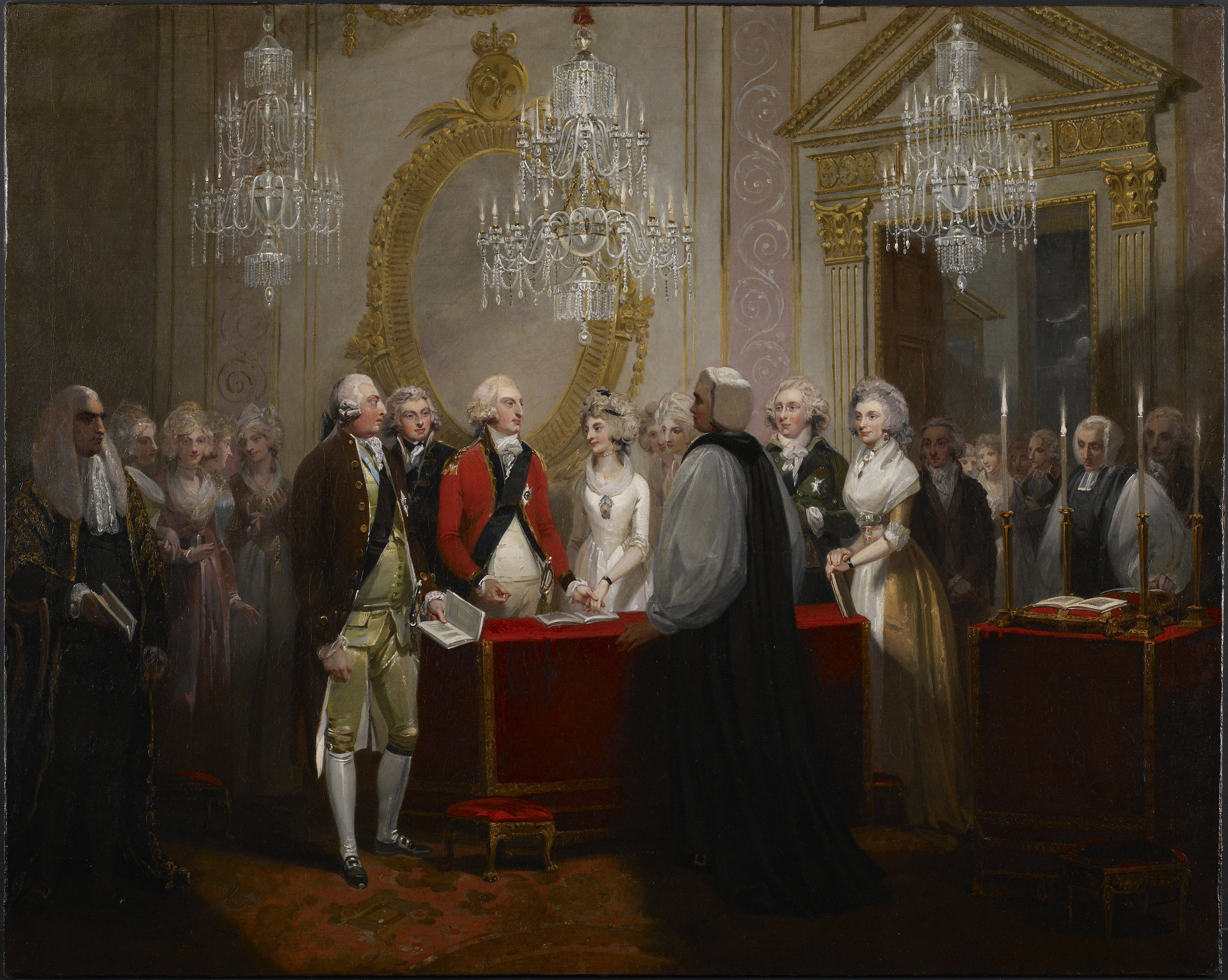
The Marriage of the Duke of York by Henry Singleton, 1791

Frederick married his third cousin Princess Frederica Charlotte of Prussia, the daughter of King Frederick William II of Prussia and Elisabeth Christine of Brunswick-Lüneburg, at Charlottenburg, Berlin, on 29 September 1791 and again on 23 November 1791 at Buckingham Palace. The marriage was not a happy one and the couple soon separated. Frederica retired to Oatlands Palace, in Surrey, where she lived until her death in 1820.

== Honours and arms ==
Frederick's coat of arms, consisting of the royal arms differenced by a label of three points, the second point charged with a red cross. The Hanoverian inescutcheon showed the arms of Osnabrück (argent, a wheel of six spokes gules) en surtout.

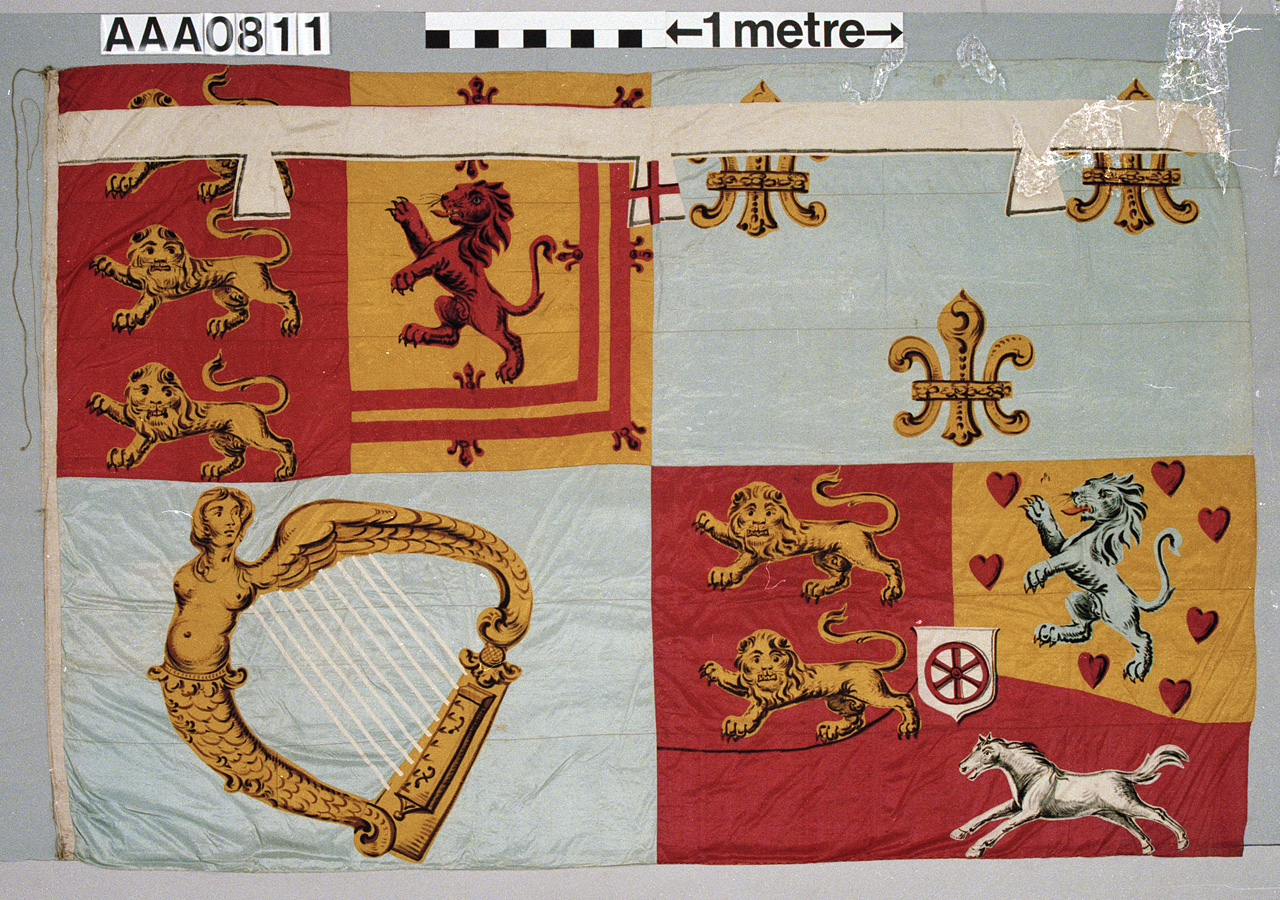
Personal standard

=== Honours ===
His honours were as follows:

- Royal Knight of the Order of the Garter, 19 June 1771
- Knight Grand Cross (military) of the Order of the Bath, 2 January 1815
- Knight Grand Cross of the Royal Guelphic Order, 12 August 1815
- Knight of the Order of the Black Eagle of Prussia, 11 April 1814
- Knight of the Order of the St-Esprit of France, 21 April 1814
- Knight of the Order of St. Andrew of Russia, 9 June 1814
- Knight of the Order of St. Alexander Nevsky of Russia, 9 June 1814
- Knight Grand Cross of the Order of Charles III of Spain, 21 August 1814
- Knight Grand Cross of the Order of Maria Theresa of Austria, 1814

== Legacy ==
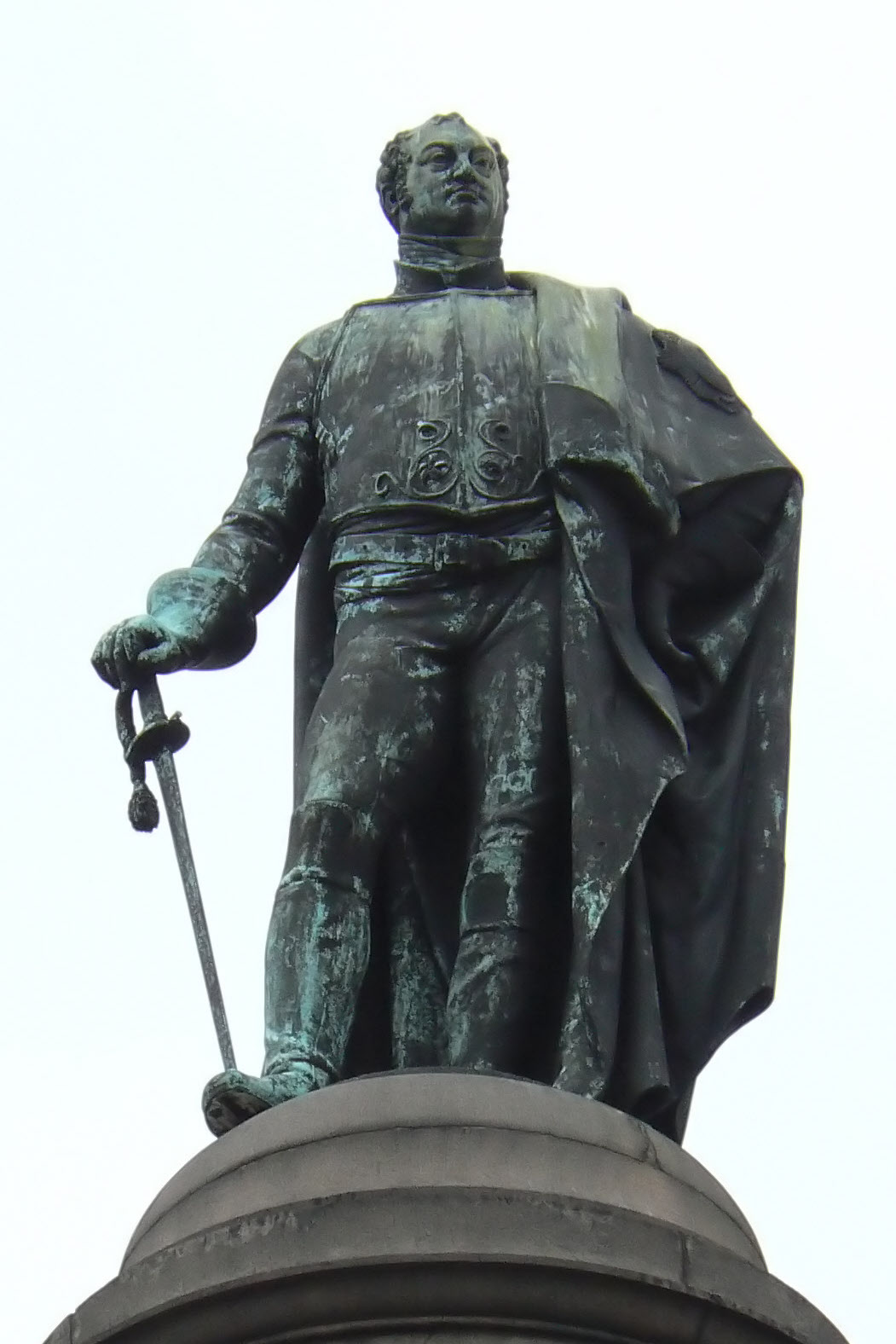
Statue of Frederick Duke of York in Waterloo Place, Westminster, London

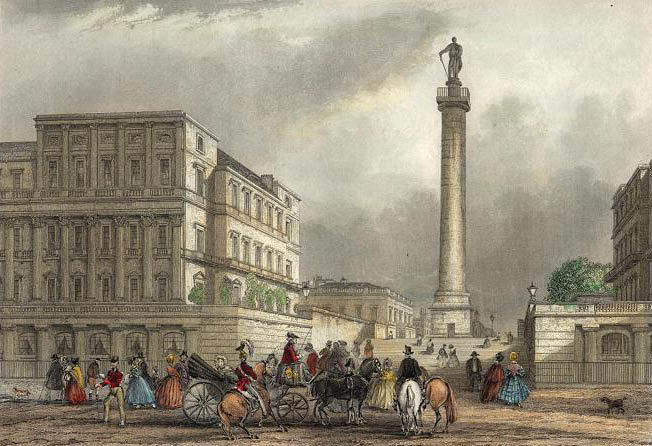
The Duke of York Column seen from The Mall, London

Fredericton, the capital of the Canadian province of New Brunswick, was named after Prince Frederick. The city was originally named "Frederick's Town".

Also in Canada, Duke of York Bay, Nunavut was named in his honour, since it was discovered on his birthday, 16 August.

A statue of Prince Frederick stands in the grounds of Edinburgh Castle, Scotland and was unveiled in 1836. The inscription reads: "Field Marshal His Royal Highness Frederick Duke of York and Albany K.G. Commander and Chief of the British Army MDCCCXXVII."

In Western Australia, York County and the towns of York and Albany were named after Prince Frederick. Albany was originally named "Frederick Town".

The towering Duke of York Column on Waterloo Place, just off The Mall, London was completed in 1834 as a memorial to Prince Frederick.

The 72nd Regiment of Foot was given the title Duke of Albany's Own Highlanders in 1823 and, in 1881, became 1st Battalion Seaforth Highlanders (Ross-shire Buffs, The Duke of Albany's).

The first British fortification in southern Africa, Fort Frederick, Port Elizabeth, a city in the Eastern Cape province of South Africa, was built in 1799 to prevent French assistance for rebellious Boers in the short-lived republic of Graaff-Reinet.

The Duke of York's Royal Military School is named in the duke's honour as he was largely responsible for the founding of the school by Royal Warrant in 1801 (it was originally called the Royal Military Asylum for the Children of Soldiers of the Regular Army). The school was moved to its current site near Dover in 1909. The original building still stands in Chelsea, London.

== Ancestors ==
Ancestors of Prince Frederick, Duke of York and Albany

8. George II of Great Britain
4. Frederick, Prince of Wales
9. Princess Caroline of Brandenburg-Ansbach
2. George III of the United Kingdom
10. Frederick II, Duke of Saxe-Gotha-Altenburg
5. Princess Augusta of Saxe-Gotha
11. Princess Magdalena Augusta of Anhalt-Zerbst
1. Prince Frederick, Duke of York and Albany
12. Adolphus Frederick II, Duke of Mecklenburg-Strelitz
6. Duke Charles Louis Frederick of Mecklenburg-Strelitz
13. Princess Christiane Emilie of Schwarzburg-Sondershausen
3. Princess Charlotte of Mecklenburg-Strelitz
14. Ernest Frederick I, Duke of Saxe-Hildburghausen
7. Princess Elisabeth Albertine of Saxe-Hildburghausen
15. Countess Sophia Albertine of Erbach-Erbach

== See also ==
- Beer money – a notable military allowance of the time
- List of famous duels

== Sources ==
- Cokayne, G. E. (2000). The Complete Peerage of England, Scotland, Ireland, Great Britain and the United Kingdom, Extant, Extinct or Dormant, new ed., 13 volumes in 14 (1910–1959), volume XII/2. Alan Sutton Publishing.
- Fox-Davies, Arthur (1909). A Complete Guide to Heraldry. London.
- Glover, Richard (1973). Britain at Bay: Defence against Bonaparte, 1803–14, Historical problems: Studies and documents series No.20. George Allen and Unwin Ltd., London.
- Glover, Richard (1963). Peninsular Preparation: The Reform of the British Army 1795–1809. Cambridge University Press.
- Heathcote, Tony (1999). The British Field Marshals 1736–1997. Pen & Sword Books Ltd. ISBN 0-85052-696-5.
- Opie, I. & Opie, P. (1997). The Oxford Dictionary of Nursery Rhymes. Oxford University Press, 1951, 2nd edn.
- Taylor, Isaac (1898). Names and Their Histories: A Handbook of Historical Geography. Rivingtons, London. p. 300. OCLC 4161840. "duke of york's bay."
- Weir, Alison (1999). Britain's Royal Family: A Complete Genealogy. The Bodley Head, London.
- McNaughton, C. Arnold (1973). The Book of Kings: A Royal Genealogy. Garnstone Press.
- Louda, Jiri & MacLagan, Michael (1999). Lines of Succession: Heraldry of the Royal Families of Europe, 2nd edition. Little, Brown and Company.

Prince Frederick, Duke of York and Albany House of Hanover Cadet branch of the House of Welf Born: 16 August 1763 Died: 5 January 1827
Regnal titles
Vacant Title last held by Clemens August of Bavaria	Prince-Bishop of Osnabrück; 1764–1802 as Protestant Administrator	Vacant Title next held by Paul Melchers as bishop
Military offices
Preceded by The Lord Amherst	Captain and Colonel of the 2nd Troop Horse Grenadier Guards; 1782–1784	Succeeded by Earl Percy
Preceded by The Earl Waldegrave	Colonel of the Coldstream Guards; 1784–1805	Succeeded by The Duke of Cambridge
Preceded by The Lord Amherst	Commander-in-Chief of the Forces; 1795–1809	Succeeded by Sir David Dundas
Preceded by The Lord Amherst	Colonel-in-Chief of the 60th (Royal American) Regiment of Foot; 1797–1827	Succeeded by The Duke of Cambridge
Vacant Title last held by The Duke of Cumberland	Captain-General; 1799–1809	Office abolished
Preceded by The Duke of Gloucester and Edinburgh	Colonel of the 1st Regiment of Foot Guards; 1805–1827	Succeeded by The Duke of Wellington
Preceded by Sir David Dundas	Commander-in-Chief of the Forces; 1811–1827	Succeeded by The Duke of Wellington
Honorary titles
Vacant Title last held by The Duke of Montagu	Great Master of the Bath; 1767–1827	Succeeded by The Duke of Clarence and St. Andrews later became King William IV
Preceded by The Prince of Wales later became King George IV	President of the Foundling Hospital; 1820–1827	Succeeded by The Duke of Cambridge
