= Battle of Jemappes =

Part of the War of the First Coalition (1792)

- Part of the Flanders campaign in the War of the First Coalition
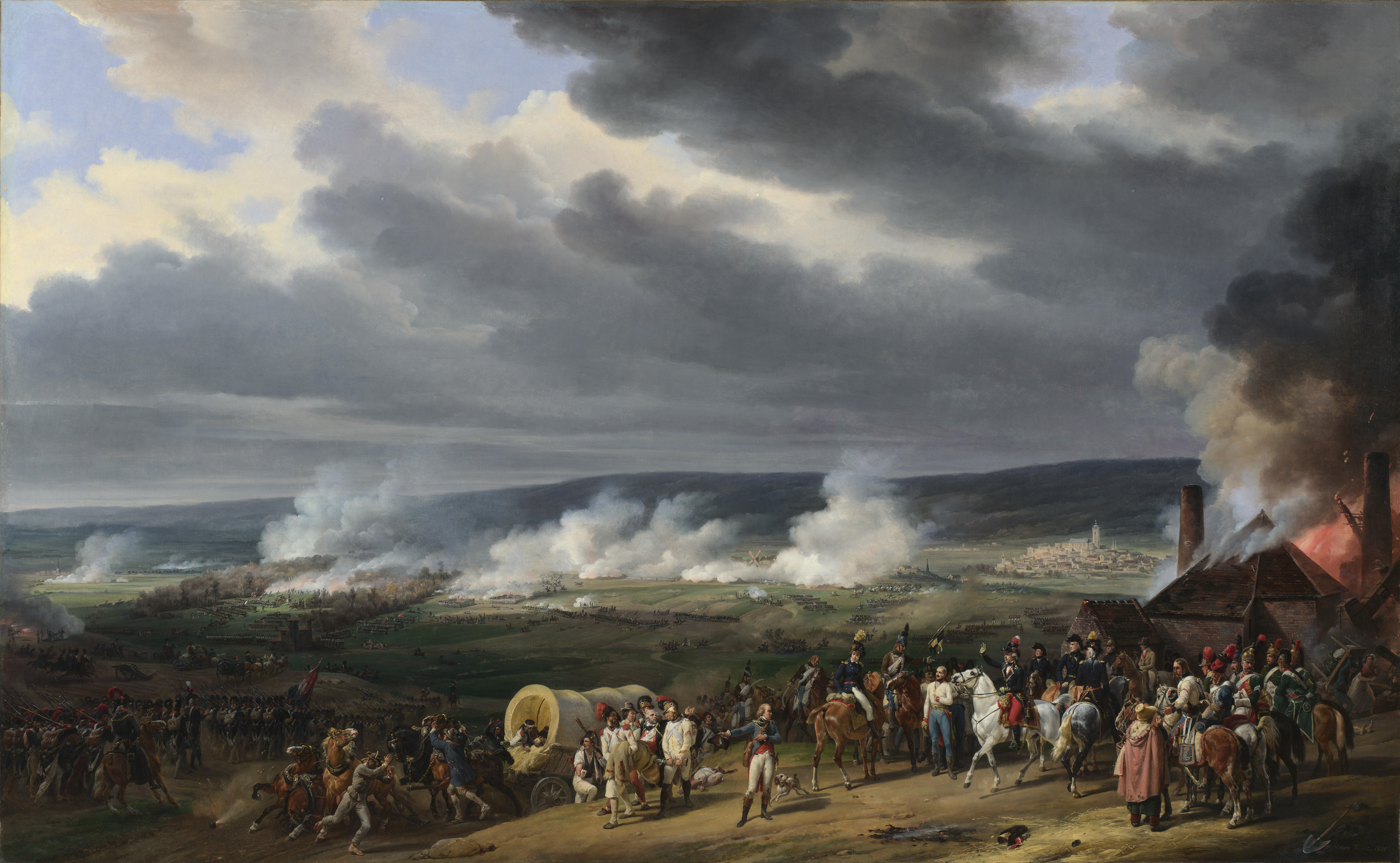
- The Battle of Jemappes; Horace Vernet, 1821
Date	6 November 1792
Location	Near Jemappes, Austrian Netherlands 50°27′21″N 3°53′19″E
Result	French victory: Start of the Flanders campaign

Belligerents
France	Holy Roman Empire

Commanders and leaders
Charles Dumouriez; Louis Philippe	Duke of Teschen; Count of Clerfayt

Strength
40,000–45,000; 100 guns	13,200–13,796; 54–56 guns

Casualties and losses
2,000	1,241–1,500; 5 guns
- Location within Europe

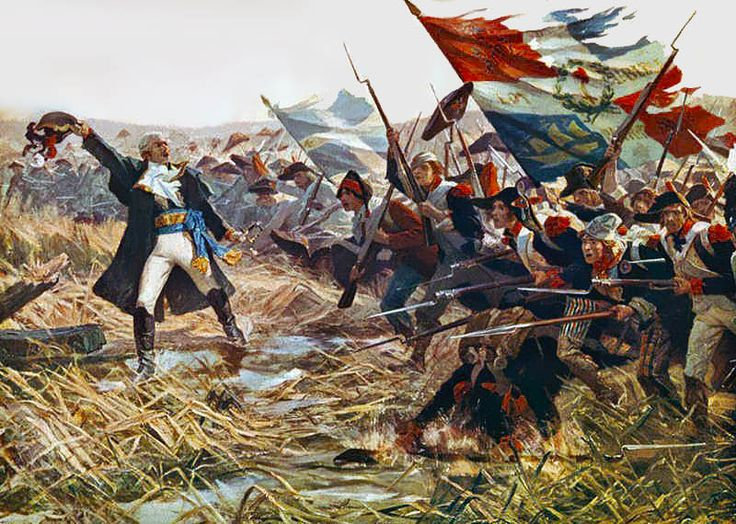
Parisian battalions and the 19th regiment of Flanders led by Auguste Dampierre at the Battle of Jemmapes, by Raymond Desvarraux

The Battle of Jemappes (6 November 1792) took place near the town of Jemappes in Hainaut, Austrian Netherlands (now Belgium), near Mons during the War of the First Coalition, part of the French Revolutionary Wars. One of the first major offensive battles of the war, it was a victory for the armies of the infant French Republic, and saw the French Armée du Nord, which included many inexperienced volunteers, defeat a substantially smaller regular Austrian army.

General Charles François Dumouriez, in command of an army of French Revolutionary volunteers, faced the Imperial army of Field Marshal Duke Albert of Saxe-Teschen and his second-in-command François de Croix, Count of Clerfayt. The French, who outnumbered their opponents by about three-to-one, launched a series of enthusiastic but uncoordinated attacks against the Austrian position on a ridge. At length, the French seized a portion of the ridge and the Austrians were unable to drive them away. Saxe-Teschen conceded defeat by ordering a withdrawal.

Jemappes was won by costly but effective charges against the Austrians' prepared position. Dumouriez overran the Austrian Netherlands within a month, but lost it at the Battle of Neerwinden in March. The French would not reconquer the Austrian Netherlands until the summer of 1794.

== Background ==
In the summer of 1792 Charles Dumouriez, the French foreign minister and commander of the Armée du Nord, had believed that the best way to prevent an Austrian and Prussian invasion of France was to invade the Austrian Netherlands, but the Allies had launched their invasion before Dumouriez was ready to move, and he had been forced to move south. The Allied invasion had been at Valmy on 20 September where the French army stood up to an artillery bombardment, and proved that it would not flee at the first sign of opposition. The Allied commander, the Duke of Brunswick, was not willing to risk a full-scale assault on the French line, and withdrew after it.

This left Dumouriez free to move north, to first raise the siege to Lille in late September and into early October, and then to launch his long-planned invasion of the Austrian Netherlands. His original plan for a three-pronged invasion had to be changed, as the promised resources to achieve it proved unavailable, and instead, at the end of October, he concentrated most of his men in front of Valenciennes and marched towards Mons, and the way to Brussels.

== Opposing forces ==
=== Austrians ===
The Austrian army was commanded by Duke Albert of Saxe-Teschen, the governor of the Austrian Netherlands. Although he had more than 20,000 troops available, they were scattered in a long defensive line; at Jemappes he fought with only 11,600 infantry, 2,170 cavalry and 56 guns. With this power, he tried to defend the 5-mile (8.0 km) long Cuesmes ridge which ran from Mons in the Austrian left to Jemappes on the right side.

The Austrian right was commanded by Franz Freiherr von Lilien, the center by Franz Sebastian de Croix, Count of Clerfayt, and the left by Johann Peter Freiherr von Beaulieu. Lilien had seven companies and four infantry battalions and three squadrons of cavalry on their left while Clerfayt had three infantry battalions and four squadrons around the village of Cuesmes and Beaulieu had three battalions of infantry on the hills south of Bertaimont with five companies of infantry and a squadron of cavalry guarding his left. Two other companies were further to the left around Mont Palisel and an infantry battalion was at Mons.

The Austrian army positioned themselves on the marshes around the Trouille groves and rivers, with two dams to their rear. The only other way for a retreat was via Mons.

=== French ===
Dumouriez had twice as many men as the Austrians. His own Armée du Nord contained 32,000 infantry, 3,800 cavalry and 100 guns and was supported in Jemappes by a further 4,000 men and 15 guns under General François Harville. Dumouriez's infantry battalions contained thirteen volunteers from 1792. Harville's men were also volunteers, but most of the older commanders were either experienced soldiers or aristocrats. The most obvious example was the commander of the French center, the Duke of Chartres, who had assumed the name of General Egalite, and would later become King Louis-Philippe of France. The right wing was commanded by General Pierre de Ruel, marquis de Beurnonville and the left by General Louis Marie de la Caussade Ferrand who also carried the name Jean Henri Becays Ferrand. Harville was to reinforce the right.

Dumouriez planned to use his army's numbers to overtake the Austrian position. The plan was for Harville and Beurnonville to attack first, and surround the weak Austrian left. Ferrand would then capture Quaregnon before Jemappes. Beurnonville would then attack the Austrian center while Harville moved to Mont Palisel to cut off the Austrian retreat.

== Battle ==
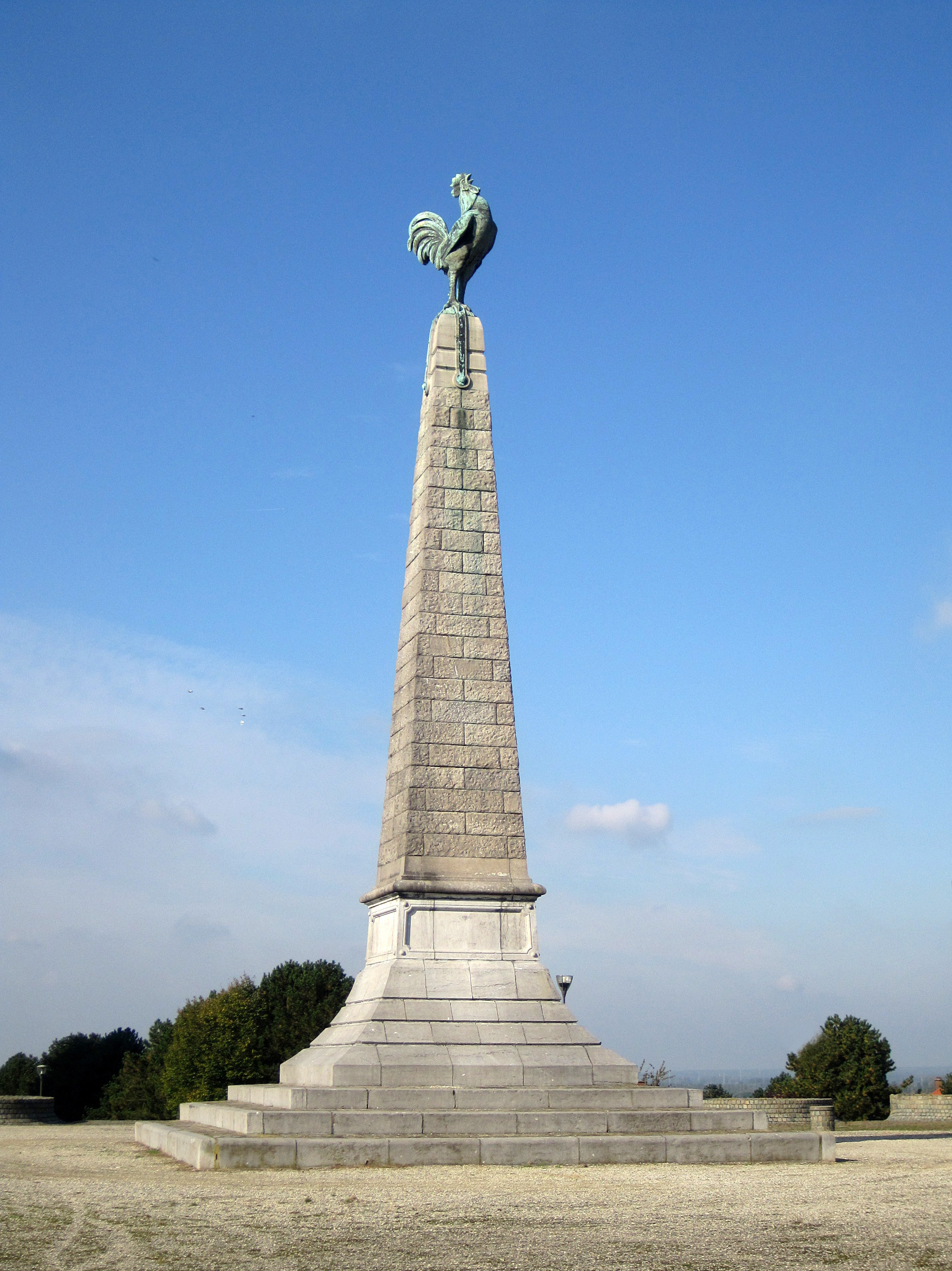
The monument of the battle in Jemappes.

Saxe-Teschen entrenched his 11,628 infantry, 2,168 cavalry and 56 guns along the Cuesmes Ridge just a few kilometers west of Mons. The Austrian artillery included fourteen 12-lb cannon, thirty-six 6-lb and 3-lb cannon and six 7-lb howitzers. The north end of the position, defended by Feldmarschall-Leutnant Franz Freiherr von Lilien, was anchored on the village of Jemappes. Feldzeugmeister Count Clerfayt commanded the center and Feldmarschall-Leutnant Johann Peter Beaulieu led the left wing. The Austrian right wing faced to the west, while the center and the left wings faced toward the southwest. The village of Cuesmes lay behind the Austrian left. One flaw in the position was that an Austrian retreat could only be made across a single bridge over the Hain River.

Dumouriez had 32,000 infantry, 3,800 cavalry and 100 artillery pieces. He expected to be joined by an additional 4,000 troops on the right under General Louis Auguste Juvénal des Ursins d'Harville. (Digby Smith gave a total of 40,000 infantry and 3,000 cavalry.) Dumouriez planned to turn both Austrian flanks. Accordingly, he divided his army into two wings, giving General Jean Henri Becays Ferrand command of the left wing and General Pierre de Ruel, marquis de Beurnonville control of the right wing. The French army was made up of a motley collection of royal army, volunteer, and national guard units.

The French made a series of "ill-coordinated but enthusiastic" attacks which began at dawn and continued throughout the morning. With momentum stalling Dumouriez ordered a renewed assault at noon. The Duke of Chartres sent a massive French column at the center of the ridge. This gained a foothold which the Austrians could not dislodge. Some French soldiers also enveloped the enemy right, threatening the Austrian rear. In response, Saxe-Teschen withdrew his right and center into Mons. Beaulieu ably covered the retreat with his left wing.

== Aftermath ==
The French reported approximately 650 dead and 1,300 wounded. One of the dead being Armand Gagné, the foster son of Marie Antoinette. The Austrians reported 305 dead, 513 wounded, plus 423 men and five guns captured. Many of the Austrian casualties were caused by the plentiful French artillery. The Bender Infantry Regiment Nr. 41 suffered especially heavy casualties, losing 14 officers and 400 rank and file. Mons surrendered to the French the day after the battle and Brussels fell on 14 November. The French populace "went wild with joy" at this first offensive victory of the war.

At first glance Jemappes was not an impressive French victory. The Austrians had suffered 818 casualties, and lost another 423 men taken prisoner, while France had a higher casualty rate and had failed to prevent the escape of a much smaller army to defend a position of danger. However, in the context of the situation in 1792, with the French army in chaos due to exile of many of its experienced officers, it was a great success. The victory at Jemappes, achieved by inexperienced volunteers over the Austrian regulars, greatly increased the confidence of the revolutionary government (National Convention) in Paris, and encouraged their tendency to aggressive warfare. In the words of British historian J. Holland Rose, "At Valmy they had merely stood their ground; at Jemappes they learnt to conquer."

In the short-term Jemappes gave the French control of the Austrian Netherlands. Mons opened its doors to Dumouriez, and he remained there until 12 November. He then moved to Brussels, fought a rearguard action in Anderlecht and captured Anderlecht on 14 November. They captured Namur on 2 December 1792 after besieging it eleven days.

This first French occupation of Belgium was short-lived, but in the few months that the revolutionaries managed to alienate the population, imposing their ideas of freedom on a conservative population. Dumouriez was forced to flee into exile after his troops had lost the Battle of Neerwinden (18 March 1793), but his victory at Jemappes was an important step in the direction of the military triumphs of the French First Republic. In addition, it ensured that the majority of the battles fought in 1793 would occur outside the borders of France.

== Notes ==
Preceded by Siege of Mainz (1792)	French Revolution: Revolutionary campaigns Battle of Jemappes	Succeeded by Siege of Namur (1792)
