= Amance, Haute-Saône =

Amance
- Commune
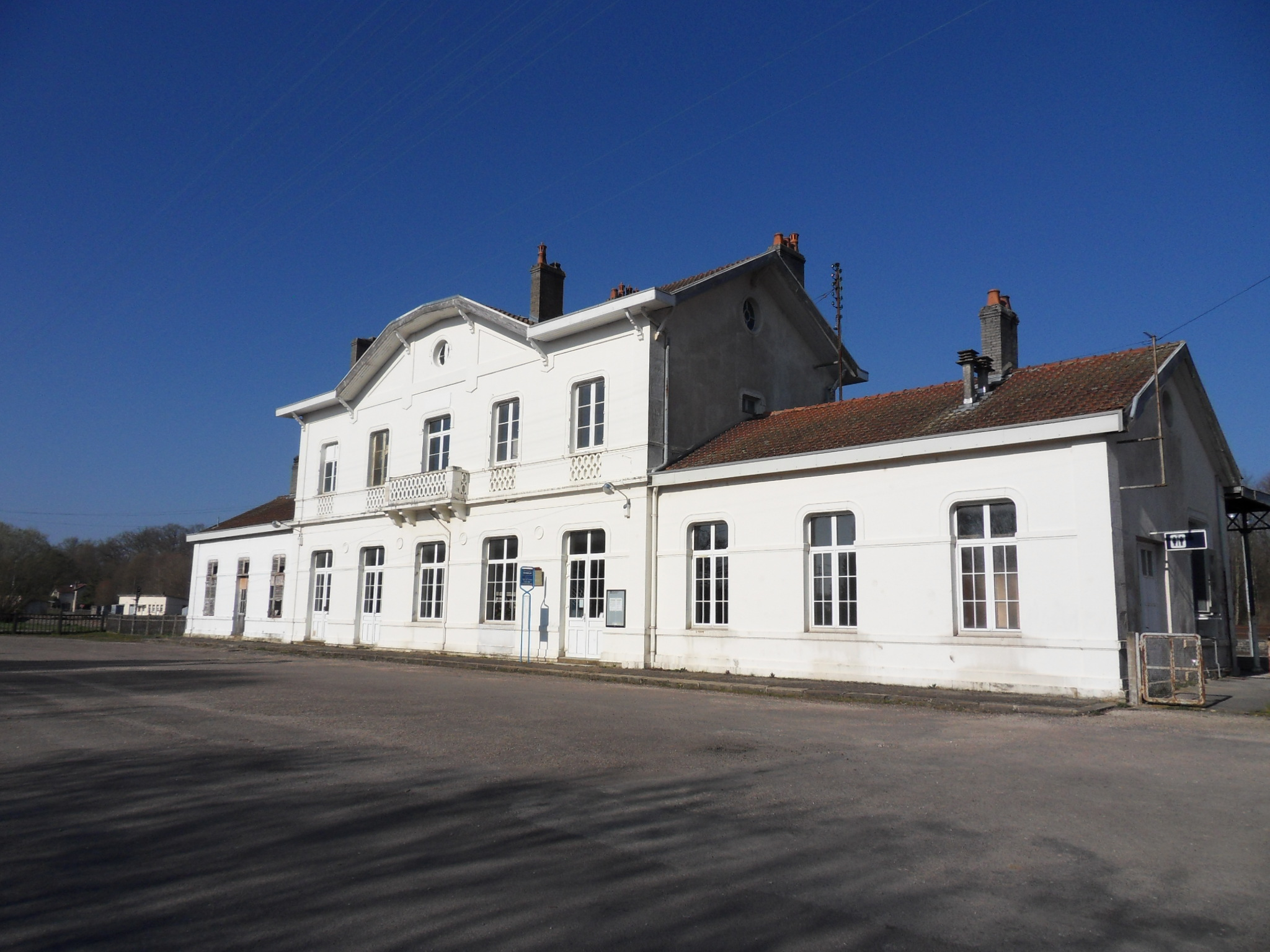
- The Port-d'Atelier-Amance railway station

- Coat of arms
- Location of Amance
- Location within France Location within Bourgogne-Franche-Comté
- Coordinates: 47°48′08″N 6°03′32″E
- Country: France
- Region: Bourgogne-Franche-Comté
- Department: Haute-Saône
- Arrondissement: Vesoul
- Canton: Port-sur-Saône

Government
  - Mayor (2020–2026): Jean-Marie Bertin
- Area^{1}: 17.54 km^{2} (6.77 sq mi)
- Highest elevation: 287 m (942 ft)
- Lowest elevation: 210 m (690 ft)
- Population (2023): 669
  - Density: 38.1/km^{2} (98.8/sq mi)
- Time zone: UTC+01:00 (CET)
  - Summer (DST): UTC+02:00 (CEST)
- INSEE/Postal code: 70012 /70160
- ^{1} French Land Register data, which excludes lakes, ponds, glaciers > 1 km^{2} (0.386 sq mi or 247 acres) and river estuaries.

Amance (French pronunciation: [amɑ̃s]) is a commune in the Haute-Saône department in the region of Bourgogne-Franche-Comté in eastern France.

== See also ==
- Communes of the Haute-Saône department
