= Battle of Focșani =

1789 battle of the Russo-Turkish War (1787–1792)

Coordinates: 45°42′0″N 27°10′47″E

- Part of Russo-Turkish War (1787–1792) and Austro-Turkish War (1788–1791)
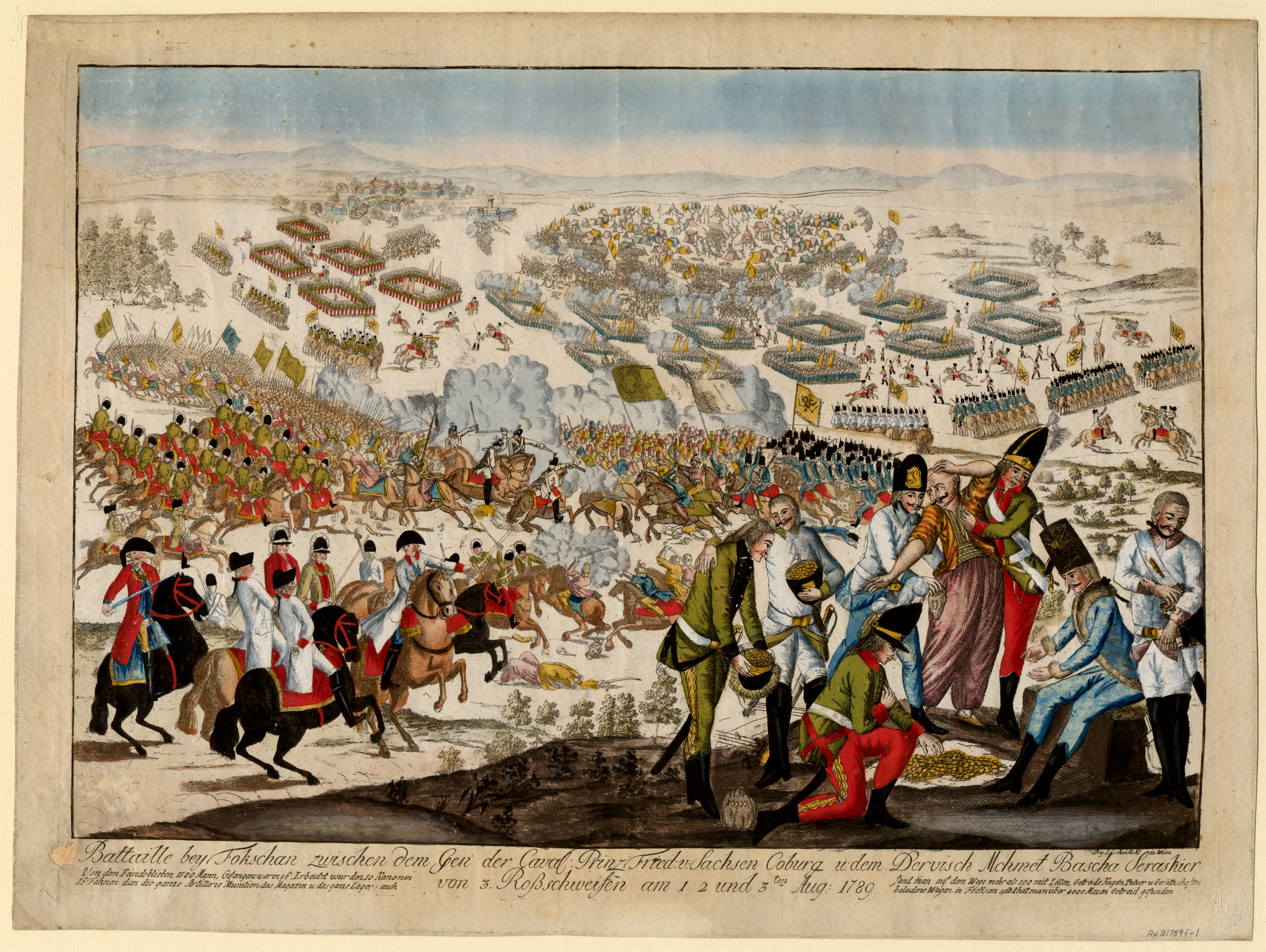
- The Battle of Focsani by Johann Hieronymus Löschenkohl
Date	1 August 1789
Location	Focșani, Moldavia
Result	Austro-Russian victory

Belligerents
Russian Empire; Habsburg Monarchy	Ottoman Empire

Commanders and leaders
(Russian Empire) Alexander Suvorov (Habsburg monarchy) Prince Josias of Coburg	Koca Yusuf Pasha; Osman Pasha

Strength
23,000–25,000: (Habsburg monarchy) 17,000–18,000; (Russian Empire) 6,000–7,000 of 10,000 (Note: Suvorov's entire division.)	c. 30,000

Casualties and losses
400 to 800 killed and wounded	1,500–1,600 killed and 2,500 wounded 12 guns

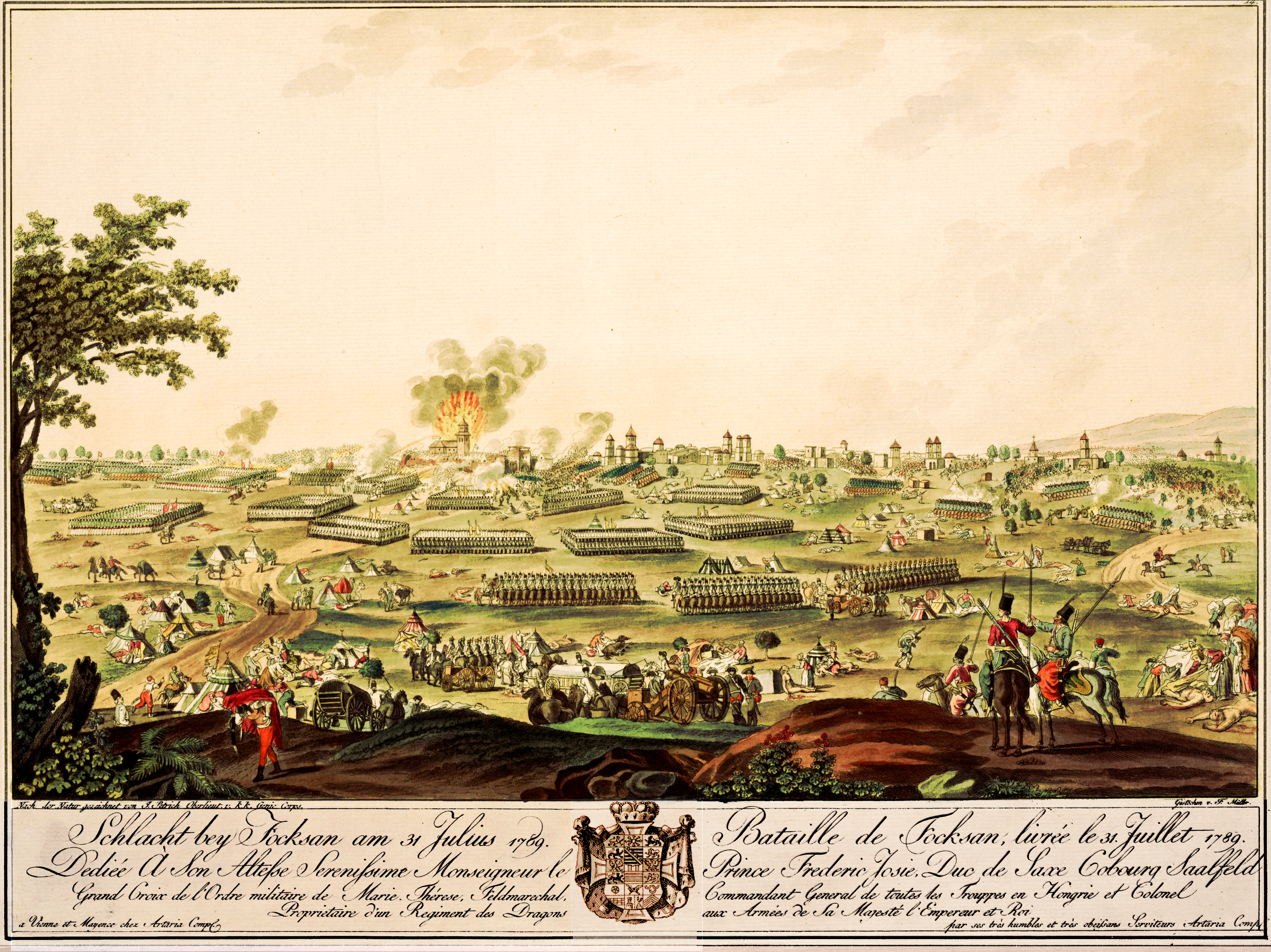
Battle of Focsani

The Battle of Focșani (also Battle of Fokschani or Battle of Focsani; Hungarian: Foksányi csata) took place during the Russo-Turkish War (1787–1792) on 1 August 1789 (Old Style 21 July) between the Ottoman Empire and the alliance of the Russian Empire and the Habsburg monarchy near Focșani, Moldavia (now in Romania). The Russians were led by Alexander Suvorov, the Austrians by Prince Josias of Coburg, and the Ottomans by Grand Vizier Koca Yusuf Pasha.

The Austrian army numbered 18,000 Austrian and Hungarian troops. The Russian contingent was made up of 7,000 soldiers. The Ottomans mustered ca. 30,000 soldiers.

The allies stormed the Ottoman entrenched camp and drove the Turks out of Moldavia.

== The Moldavian campaign begins ==
As the campaigning season of 1789 began, Koca Yusuf Pasha, Grand Vizier of the Ottoman Empire, took steps to defend the vassal states of Moldavia and Wallachia. He faced the prospect of offensives from two directions. To the northwest lay an Austrian army of 18,000 men under Coburg. Meanwhile, Suvorov was marching Russian troops into Moldavia from the northeast. Yusuf Pasha determined to attack the Austrian forces before they could link up with their Russian allies. To this end, he ordered Osman Pasha to lead an army of 30,000 men north to Focșani. The town was an important trade center strategically located on the border between Moldavia and Wallachia. Learning of the Ottoman approach, Coburg asked his Russian counterpart for assistance. Suvorov marched with 7,000 men. He left his position at Bârlad on July 28 and marched 40 miles in 28 hours to reach Coburg the next day on the Siret River.

== Preparation for battle ==
The Russians and Austrians advanced from the Siret in two columns. Suvorov commanded the left column, Coburg the right. They made contact with Osman Pasha's outposts on July 31 and drove them back on the main Turkish army at Focșani.

On August 1, Suvorov and Coburg drew up their forces in two lines, with their infantry in squares. The illustration accompanying this article shows infantry in square formations.

In previous engagements with the Ottomans, the Russian Army had deployed its infantry in line. Russian commanders soon found that using linear tactics against the Turks led to disaster. The Ottomans attacked the long and thin Russian lines with masses of excellent cavalry, which were able to pierce the Russian formations and break them into fragments. Suvorov and others reorganized their battle formations into square. These squares could repel Ottoman cavalry charges and then advance to win battles. Suvorov used squares made up of individual regiments and battalions, disposed in a checkerboard pattern, with skirmishers in loose order. His battlefield deployment led to more flexibility, speed, mutual fire support, ability to break through the Ottoman defenses, and steadfastness in repelling Turkish cavalry and light infantry attacks.

The Austrians had reached a conclusion similar to that of the Russians. In the Austro-Turkish War (1737–1739), the Austrians had used linear tactics against the Ottomans. Now they adopted infantry squares arranged to offer mutual support.

Ironically, by the late 18th century, Ottoman cavalry such as feudal sipahis and deli volunteers, had declined substantially in quality and importance. The mainstays of an Ottoman army were the professional artillery corps and the infantry, including salaried troops such as janissaries and auxiliaries such as those fielded by the boyar aristocracy of Moldavia and Wallachia.

== The Battle of Focșani ==
The battle began around 9:00 a.m. on August 1, 1789, as the Russian and Austrian artillery opened fire on the Turkish lines. The Turks had fortified their camp with a line of entrenchments. Ottoman troops in the Balkans were experienced at erecting field fortifications, which could include ditches, earthen ramparts, and wooden palisades and towers. The Ottomans sortied from their defenses to attack the allies all along their battle line. Allied artillery and musket fire drove the Turks back.

Suvorov then attacked the Turkish right flank. The Russian cavalry was repulsed, but the Russian infantry attack was successful. The Turks were pushed back into their entrenchments under close range Russian fire. On the Ottoman left, the Austrian infantry also threw back the defenders. Defeated on both ends of their line, the Ottomans fled. The victory was complete by 4:00 p.m. The allies lacked the resources to pursue the Turks and advanced no further into Ottoman territory.

The Turkish casualties numbered 1,500 dead and 2,500 wounded. Allied casualties amounted to 800. The allies had captured 12 Ottoman guns.

== Aftermath ==
With Osman Pasha beaten and driven from Moldavia, Yusuf Pasha's replacement as Grand Vizier, Cenaze Hasan Pasha, had to come up with a new strategy. In September, the Vizier himself went on the offensive with 100,000 men. Again, Suvorov joined Coburg, and the result was a great allied victory at the Battle of Rymnik.

== Order of battle ==
The following is a list of the units that comprised the Austro-Russian army at Focșani. Russian units:

- Apsheron Musketeer Regiment,
- Rostov Musketeer Regiment,
- Smolensk Musketeer Regiment,
- Jäger regiment,
- 2 grenadier battalions,
- Ryazan Dragoon Regiment,
- Starodub Dragoon Regiment,
- Chernigov Dragoon Regiment,
- Cossacks.

Austrian units:

- Kaiser Infantry Regiment,
- Kaunitz Infantry Regiment,
- Schröder Infantry Regiment,
- Wenzel Colloredo Infantry Regiment,
- First Szekler Grenz Regiment,
- Second Szekler Grenz Regiment,
- Karl Toscana Grenadier Battalion,
- Khevenhüller Grenadier Battalion,
- Mittrowsky Grenadier Battalion,
- Pellegrini Grenadier Battalion,
- Levenher Chevauxleger Regiment,
- Barco Hussar Regiment,
- Kaiser Hussar Regiment,
- Szekler Hussar Regiment,
- Arnauten (Albanian auxiliaries) or local auxiliaries: Wallachian for Habsburg forces, "armed Moldavian" in Russian forces..
In images:
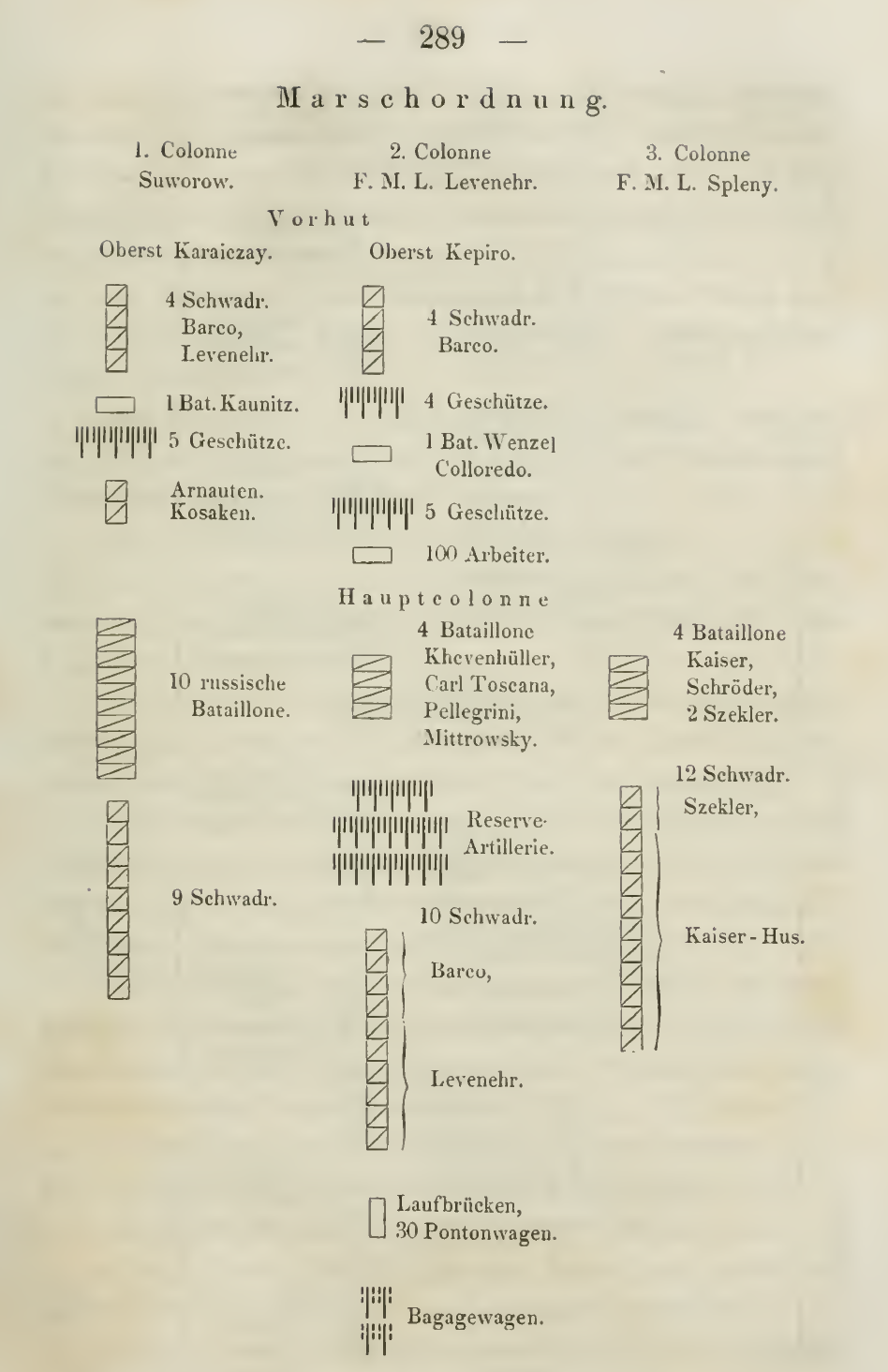
Battle of Focșani march-order

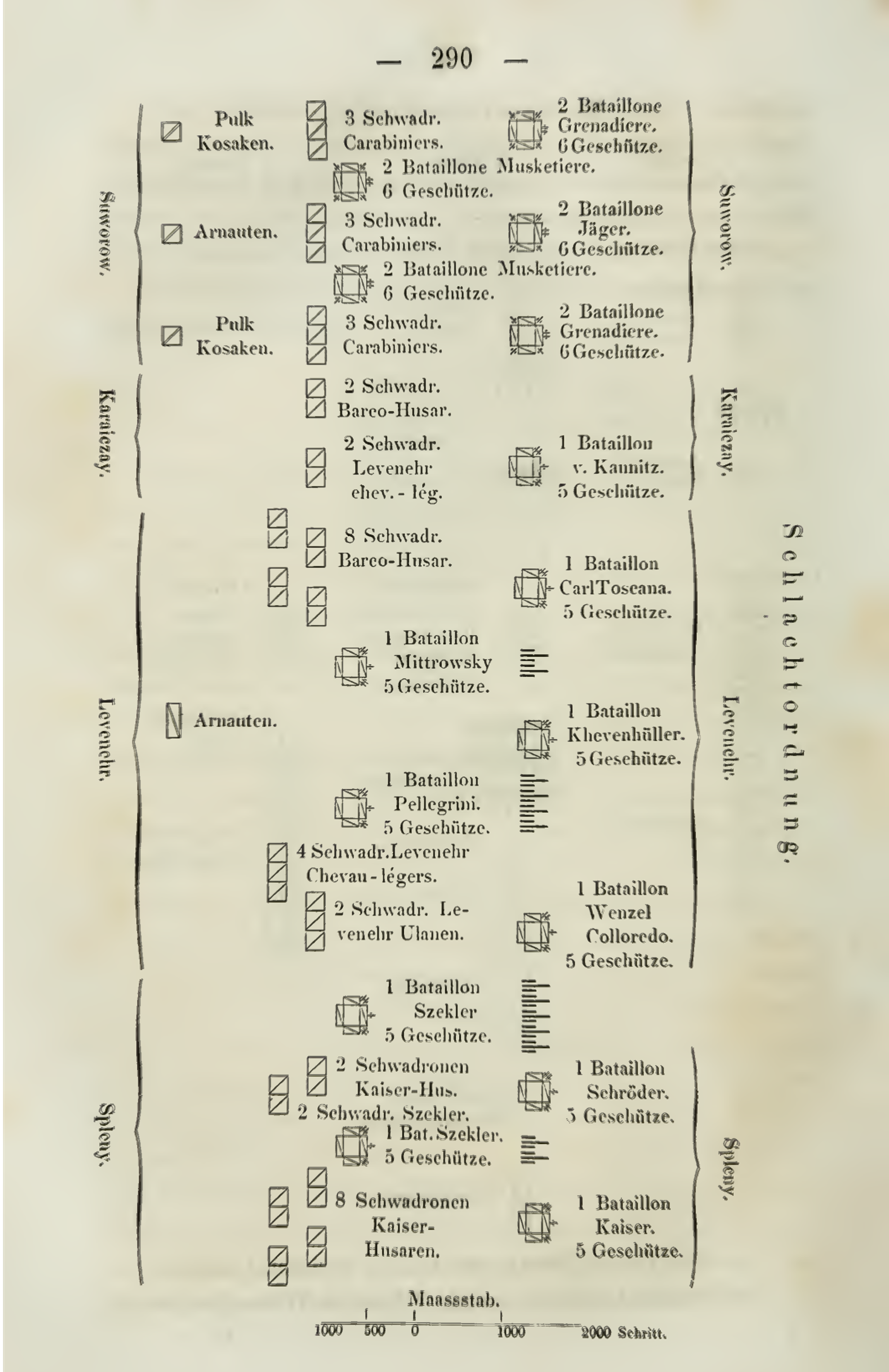
Order of battle

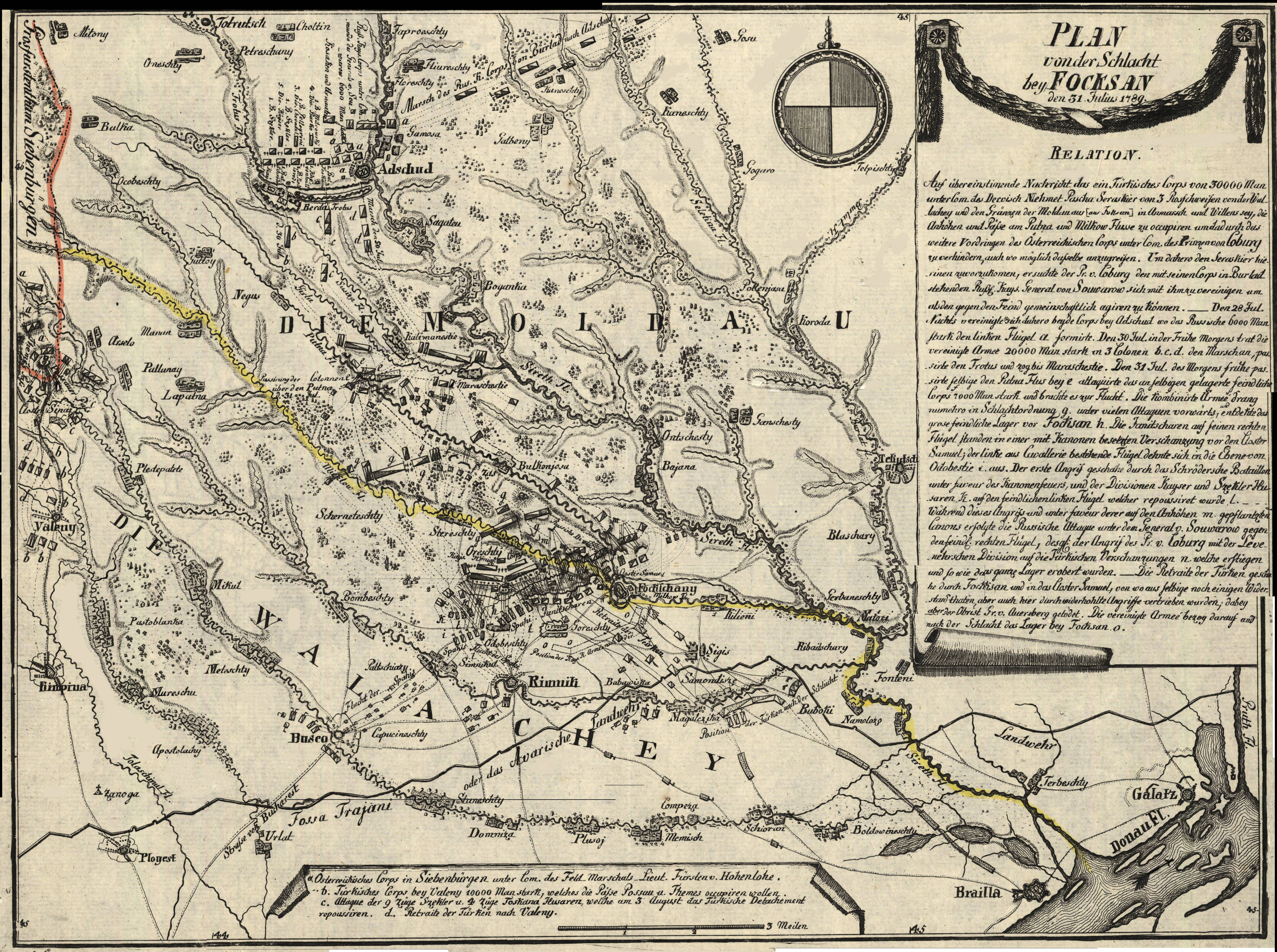
Deployment map

== Sources ==
- Black, Jeremy. The Cambridge Illustrated Atlas of Warfare: Renaissance to Revolution, 1492-1792. Cambridge: Cambridge University Press, 1996.
- Criste, O., Kriege under Kaiser Josef II. Vienna: K.u.K. Kriegsarchivs, 1904. Nafziger Collection, http://usacac.army.mil/cac2/CGSC/CARL/nafziger/789GAA.pdf, http://usacac.army.mil/cac2/CGSC/CARL/nafziger/789HAA.pdf (accessed December 20, 2017).
- Field, Jacob F. "Focsani, 1 August 1789", R.G. Grant, ed., 1001 Battles that Changed the Course of History. New York: Universe Publishing, 2011.
- Onacewicz, Wlodzimierz. Empires by Conquest. Fairfax: Hero Books, 1985.
- Nicolle, David, and Angus McBride. Armies of the Ottoman Empire, 1775-1820. London: Osprey, 1998.
- Tucker, Spencer C., ed. "Aleksandr Vasilievich Suvorov", A Global Chronology of Conflict: From the Ancient World to the Modern Middle East. ABC-CLIO, 2010.
