= Battle of Rymnik =

1789 battle of the Russo-Turkish War (1787–1792)

Coordinates: 45.3917°N 27.0611°E

- Part of the Russo-Turkish War (1787–1792) and the Austro-Turkish War (1788–1791)
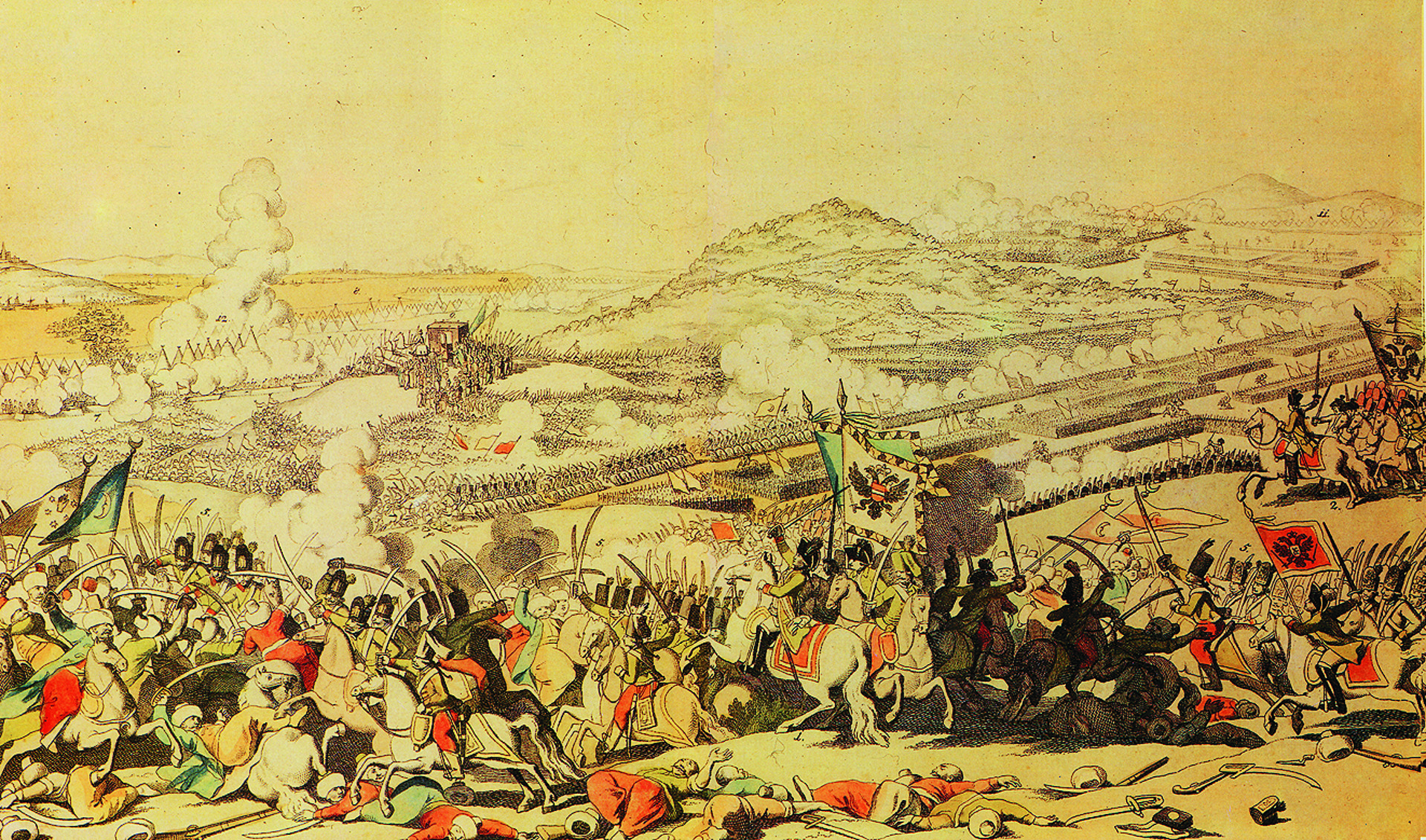
- Clash between Russo-Austrian and Turkish troops in the Battle of Rymnik
Date	22 September 1789
Location	Râmnicul Sărat River / Râmnicu Sărat, Wallachia
Result	Austro-Russian victory
Territorial changes	Wallachia occupied by Habsburg forces

Belligerents
Russia; Austria	Ottoman Empire

Commanders and leaders
(Russian Empire) Alexander Suvorov; (Russian Empire) Aleksandr Poznyakov; (Habsburg monarchy) Josias of Coburg; (Habsburg monarchy) Andreas Karaczay	Hasan Pasha; Hadji Mustafa Pasha

Strength
25,000; (Habsburg monarchy) ~18,000; (Russian Empire) ~7,000; 73 guns	100,000: • 40,000 janissaries (Note: They were only engaged towards the end of battle (also in the pursuit), and – because of the occupied battle terrain – not all of them.); • 40,000 cavalry; • 20,000 other; 85 guns

Casualties and losses
1,000	20,000 (Note: On the whole day of September 22, the allies captured no more than 400 Ottoman men, whose total loss was more than 15,000. Hasan Pasha reported that his losses exceeded 20,000 men. In addition, the allies took 100 standards, 6 mortars, 7 siege and 67 field guns; three Ottoman camps, many horses, camels, supplies and other things went to the allies.: The loss of scattered ones is not taken into account. One Russian estimate is the remaining 15,000 men from the dispersed ~80,000-strong army who had assembled in Maçin.)

The Battle of Rymnik or Rimnik, also Battle of Mărtinești (Note: The Austrian name) (Turkish: Boze Savaşı [Battle of the Boze]; Russian: Рымникское сражение [Battle of the Rymnik]; German: Schlacht am Rimnik), on September 22 [O.S. September 11] 1789, took place in Wallachia, at the Râmnicul Sărat River, known as the Rymnik, near Râmnicu Sărat or Rymnik (now in Romania) during the Russo-Turkish War of 1787–1792 and the Austro-Turkish War of 1788–1791. The Russian general Alexander Suvorov, acting together with the Habsburg general Prince Josias of Coburg, attacked the main Ottoman army under Grand Vizier Cenaze Hasan Pasha, which was much larger.

The result was a crushing Russo-Austrian victory. Although this battle was fought in accordance with Suvorov's intentions, the Austrians made up the bulk of the victorious allied troops. According to Suvorov's plan, while the Russians executed their deep, complex flanking attack on the Ottoman left wing across broken ground, the Austrians bore the brunt of the Ottoman attack. Their force was almost surrounded on the left, but they held on, and with the help of Suvorov's reinforcements, they managed to throw the enemy back. Ultimately, the general attack on the main Ottoman foothold broke the army's spirit, and its defeat was completed in the subsequent pursuit. Thus the Ottomans were decisively defeated piecemeal. The battle is regarded as one of the most noteworthy feats of military history and one of Suvorov's greatest achievements. For this battle, he received the addition Rymniksky to his family name and the title of count.

After Suvorov's retreat from Switzerland, the Prince of Coburg wrote to Suvorov that he appreciated the events he had gone through with him in the Turkish war and regretted that the Russian general had not been able to achieve the upper hand. (Note: Alexander Suvorov § Suvorov, Nelson, Coburg, and Charles)

== Background ==
In September 1789, the Ottoman vizier Cenaze Hasan Pasha, vowing revenge for their forces' defeat at Focșani, raised an army of up to 100,000 men, (Note: Russian historian Petrov says "90,000 or 100,000.") with 40,000 janissaries and 40,000 cavalry including sipahi and deli, to defeat the combined Austro-Russian armies under generals Alexander Suvorov and Prince Josias of Coburg, the future heroes of the French Revolutionary Wars. Sending his troops into a grueling night march from Brailov (now Brăila), the Pasha attacked the 18,000-strong Austrian detachment. Taking into account Josias's numbers and the Austrian underperformance in the war, specifically after the so-called "Battle of Karánsebes", the Battle of Slatina, and the Battle of Mehadia, the Pasha was convinced that he could defeat this force easily; much of the reason for the Austrian setbacks was their tactic of a thin stretched front. However, the Austrian commander repulsed the Turks after a fierce skirmish on the 19th and appealed for help to Suvorov, who was with a division south of Bârlad. Following a hard fought combat, Coburg realised that he was in danger if the main forces attacked him. Once Suvorov heard of the Ottoman advance, he succinctly replied "Coming, Suvorov." and his 7,000-strong Russian force quickly marched to their aid on the night of 19 September and covering about 60 miles (97 km) in two and a half days, having arrived on the eve of battle on 21 September and joining forces with Prince's troops. Of Suvorov's generals under him, only Major-General Poznyakov (front line), and two brigadiers. Major-General Karaczay under Coburg, the hero of that skirmish, watched the road to Râmnicu Sărat and Buzău; he would fight bravely at the Rymnik as well.

== Plan ==
Turkish troops were stationed in the basin of the Rymna (now known as the Râmna) and Rymnik Rivers in several fortified camps 6–7 kilometres (3.7–4.3 mi) apart. The Austrian commander proposed a defensive plan, arguing that the Turks had an overwhelming superiority in strength and occupied strongly fortified positions. Suvorov insisted on an immediate offensive. His plan was to defeat the enemy piecemeal. The battle order of the Russian and Austrian troops built before dawn on 22 September was 2 lines of infantry squares, behind which the cavalry was placed. The battle began and took place according to Suvorov's plan.

Suvorov, recognizing the dangers of a direct approach due to the steep banks of the Rymna and the visibility to the enemy, opted for a lower crossing point. While the Russians replenished their energy with food from the Austrians, Suvorov shared his strategy with Coburg. Despite Coburg's concerns about the numerical inferiority of the allies (almost 4 to 1), Suvorov reassured him, emphasizing that a larger enemy would create chaos and make it easier for them to advance; "That's all right," he is supposed to have said. "The greater the enemy the more they will fall over one another, and the easier it will be for us to cut through. In any case, they're not numerous enough to darken the sun for us", continued the Russian commander. Suvorov, aware of the risks but focused on boosting morale, took charge of the right flank. He knew that Turkish forces were positioned in Tyrgo Kukuli wood on the right side of the crossing and planned to neutralize them before advancing towards the main Turkish position at Kryngior Melor wood and the River Rymnik. The Austrians were to hold their position in the center while the Russians executed this detour. Suvorov's troops faced a tougher challenge, contingent upon the Austrians maintaining their stance.

== Battle ==
=== The allies' crossing of the Rymna ===
That evening, as the sun set, infantry marched out in columns, led by cavalry. "The night was pleasant, the sky speckled with stars." They moved silently. Major Voyevodsky, a military engineer, discovered a crossing point on the Rymna River. Advance troops cleared the steep banks for easy passage of guns, wagons, and other equipment. Once across, they formed 6 squares with cavalry behind and advanced towards the Ottoman camp at Tyrgo Kukuli, 4 miles (6.4 km) to the south. Turkish cannons fired as Suvorov's guns retaliated.

On the far left, the Russian square was almost at a deep gully when 12,000 troops surged out to break it up. Lieutenant-Colonel Khastatov's grenadiers struggled to hold their ground. The square's edges were breached in multiple places, and the reserve soldiers inside fought desperately to maintain formation. They grew tired of pushing Turks off their bayonets. The nearby square fired a barrage of bullets at the mass attacking them. After half an hour, the Turks retreated, chased by Austrian hussars alongside the Russians. Sergeant Major Kanatov and a group of Ryazan Carabiniers captured a standard from a group of 40 Turks. Suvorov's corps shifted left to assist Coburg, who was under attack by 20,000 men led by Hadji Soytar after crossing the river later than the Russians.

=== In the midst of fighting ===
Suvorov faced difficulties near the village of Bogza (Vrancea) when 6,000 Turks attacked a group of 50 Smolensk musketeers. Suvorov, having taken his sword from the Cossack attendant, called for the Rostov Regiment from the second line to shoot at the attacking Turks. The Russians defended themselves for an hour. Despite the bayonets of the Smolensk infantry covered in Ottoman blood, the mounted janissaries charged repeatedly, causing the Chernigov Carabiniers and Bakov Hussars to retreat after their unsuccessful attempts to break superior men with scimitars and horses. As the ground filled with bodies, the Turkish onslaught weakened until a third cavalry charge relieved the pressure. The Turks eventually retreated into Kryngior Melor wood, about 2 miles (3.2 km) away from the Russian front, where 15,000 janissaries hastily constructed earthworks. Suvorov regrouped his scattered formations and allowed his men a brief rest before continuing their march eastwards.

At the same time, Coburg, after two hours of continuous fighting, found himself engaged in a battle with 40,000 Turks, mainly cavalry. Despite heroic resistance, the Austrians were facing difficulties — their left wing was almost surrounded. Upon hearing this, Suvorov hurried to align his troops parallel to Coburg's. The squares advanced, sometimes breaking up when the commander rode forward to get a closer look at the situation. Soon they came under fire, and they continued to advance, trying to capture the artillery, but each time the Turks dragged them aside so they could not reach their goal.

As they approached the forest, they encountered Coburg's right wing. Suvorov instructed the carabiniers to position themselves between the first three Russian squares, while the hussars covered the flanks and connected with the Austrians. Suvorov then sent Colonel Zolotukhin to Coburg, requesting an immediate advance. The Austrians agreed, and the long line, stretching 4 miles (6.4 km), moved forward, shouting "Joseph" and "Catharine", converging on the Turkish positions. The Russian artillery on the flanks engaged the enemy guns, while the squares advanced within 100 yards of the earthworks, firing in all directions. The carabiniers behind them charged forward, galloping between the squares. They broke through the earthworks, and as their horses hesitated upon encountering the enemy, the riders attacked the dismounted Turks with their sabres. Colonel Miklashevsky's 400 men captured 4 guns and killed all the Turks who didn't retreat into the forest, as only the mortally wounded surrendered. The carabiniers couldn't maneuver effectively in the woods, so the jaeger entered through the dense undergrowth to engage in intense skirmishes.

=== Final phase ===
Suvorov defeated the weak Turkish left, forcing them to retreat towards their camp on the Rymnik. Russian troops across the front line seized the opportunity to continue their attacks. Musketeers, carabiniers, jaegers, Cossacks, grenadiers, and irregular Arnauts all pushed forward. "Each man fought his opponent to the death." Despite a long and tiring march, the Russian forces maintained their formation and stood strong against the Turkish cavalry. The Turkish assaults faltered, and the Russians engaged with an enemy whose strength had diminished. The battle became more about skill than numbers. The allied forces prevented the Turks from spreading out and utilizing their full force. In the forest, the jaegers and Arnauts faced larger numbers without being at a disadvantage.

The Grand Vizier, located in Kryngior Melor wood, could no longer oversee the unfolding events. He returned to his main camp on the Rymnik and confronted his retreating army, holding out the Koran and urging them to turn and confront the enemy. They argued that they couldn't withstand the attacks and passed by him. The Vizier tried to convince the fleeing gunners to stay, but they ignored him. Feeling hopeless, he also rode away towards Brailov.

The Austrians sensed the pressure easing off. Suvorov's attack on the right wing had forced the opposing strong forces to retreat. Seeing the vulnerability of their superior enemy, the Austrians aligned with the Russian advance. By nightfall, the allies had secured the field up to the Rymnik, and the soldiers settled in for the night amidst 5,000 Ottoman casualties, while unattended pack-animals, mules, buffaloes and camels wandered among their camps.

In the military history, the Battle of Rymnik is a classic example of complex manoeuvring of troops on heavily rugged terrain. The Russian-Austrian troops, having concentrated stealthily, struck a swift blow at the numerically superior enemy and defeated him in detail.

== The allied pursuit ==
Ottoman snipers were hiding in the trees at Kryngior Melor wood and had to be laboriously dealt with. Suvorov thought around 2,000 Ottomans were hiding there after the battle, but most had already escaped. Only the darkness and fatigue of the Austro-Russian troops did not allow them to continue the pursuit of the Turks over the Rymnik River. The next morning, the allies resumed the chase. They raided the Grand Vizier's camp on the other side of the river, 3 miles (4.8 km) across, and light cavalry units traveled up to 20 miles (32 km) in different directions to attack fleeing Turkish groups. Many Turks got stuck on blocked roads and tried to find safety among abandoned equipment. The Grand Vizier crossed the River Boze (or Buzău) using a bridge, which he then destroyed to slow down his pursuers. Consequently, many Turks chose to risk drowning in the river rather than face the pursuing troops with sabres and lances, leading to thousands losing their lives in the muddy and turbulent waters.

The Ottoman defeat was complete. The remnants of their army, gathered in Maçin (now Măcin), numbered no more than 15,000. The rest either fled to Buzău or scattered.

== Casualties ==
At the cost of <1,000 casualties (where no more than 500 people were killed, and the total was c. 700), Suvorov, together with Coburg, inflicted about 20,000 casualties against the Turks, who were now in full retreat from the Danubian Principalities. The Turks lost all their artillery and baggage train.

== Aftermath ==
For this victory, Alexander Suvorov was awarded the title of "Count of Rymnik" (граф Рымникский, Graf Rymniksky) by the Russian Empress Catherine the Great. On the other hand, the Ottoman vizier Cenaze Hasan Pasha was dismissed on December 2, 1789, after his defeat. These two crushing victories of Focșani and the Rymnik firmly established Suvorov as the most brilliant general of the then Russian Army; and to Coburg's honour can be attributed his resourcefulness, coolness and personal bravery, but according to his own mind, the Austrians had forgotten how to fight the Turks. Meanwhile, the Habsburgs occupied all of Wallachia until the war ended.

== Gallery ==
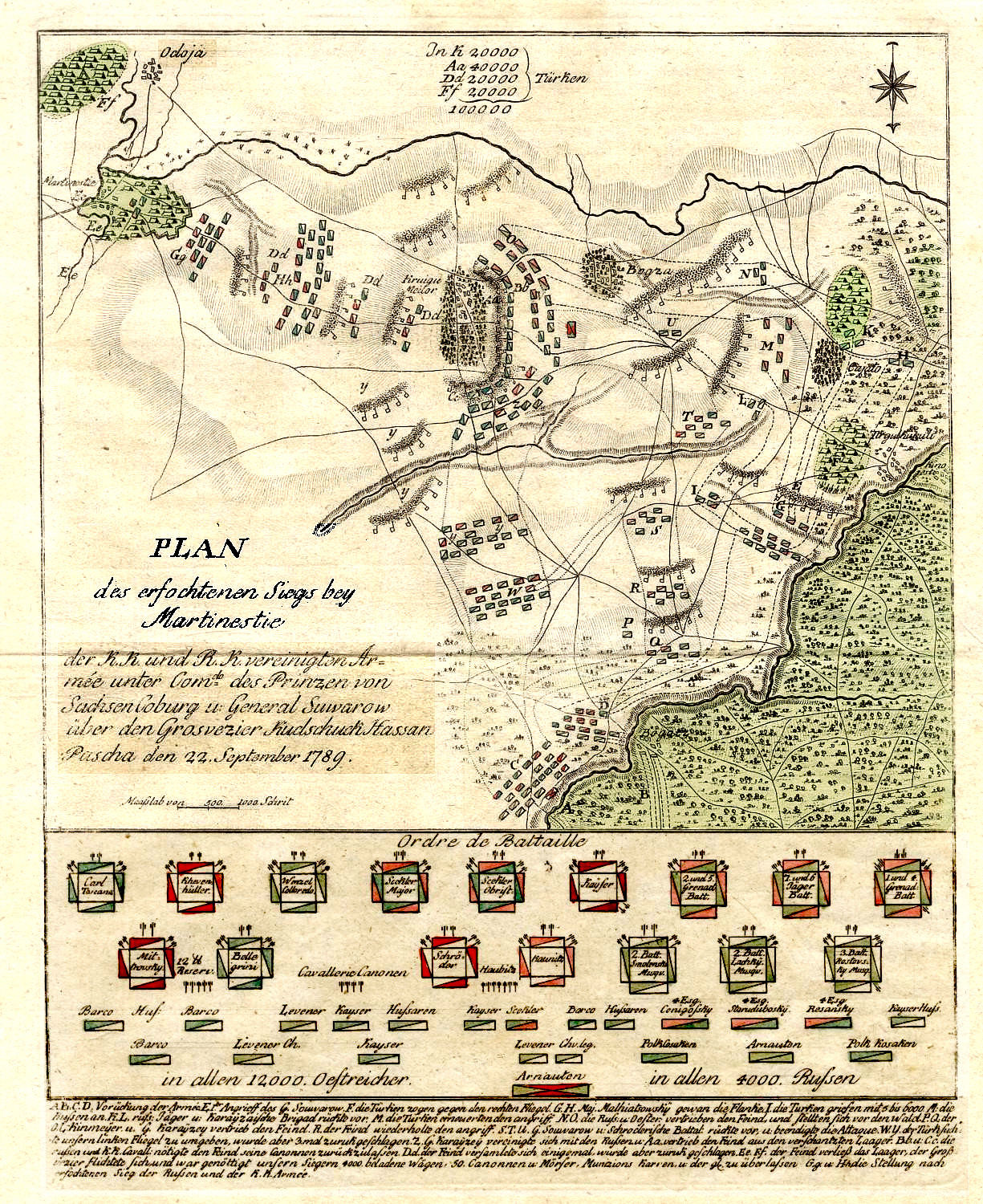
Map of Battle of Rymnik

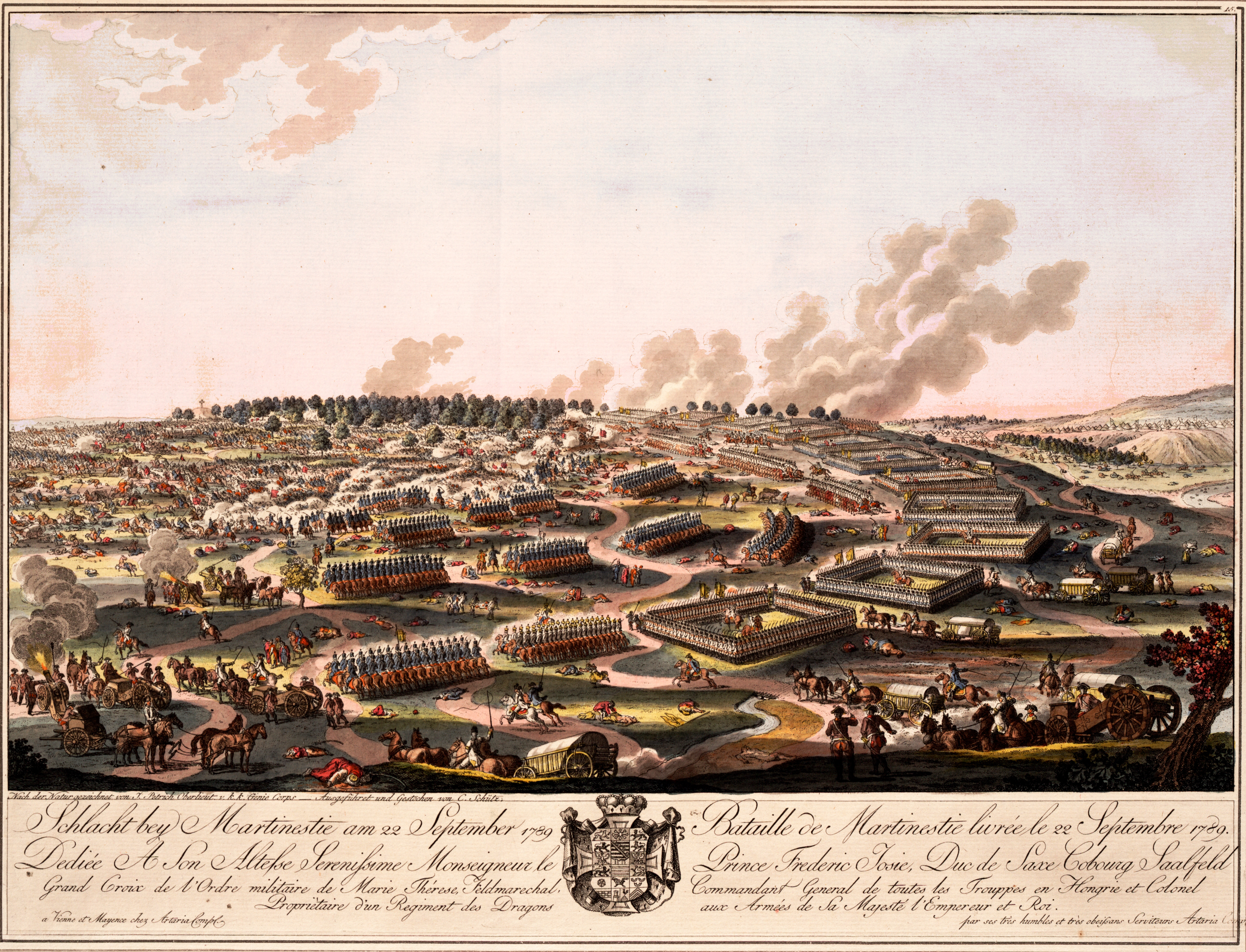
Depiction by Carl Schütz

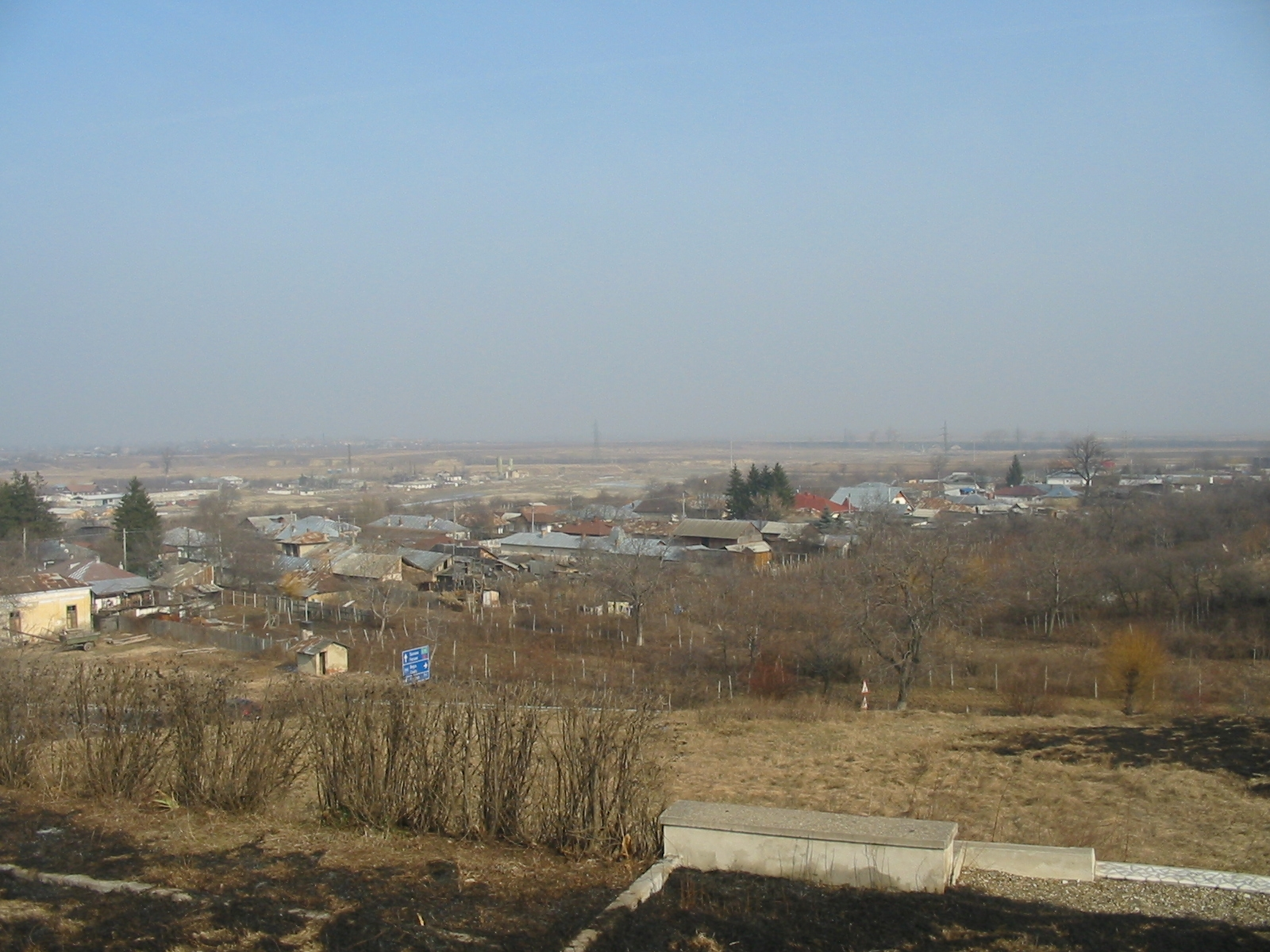
The battlefield

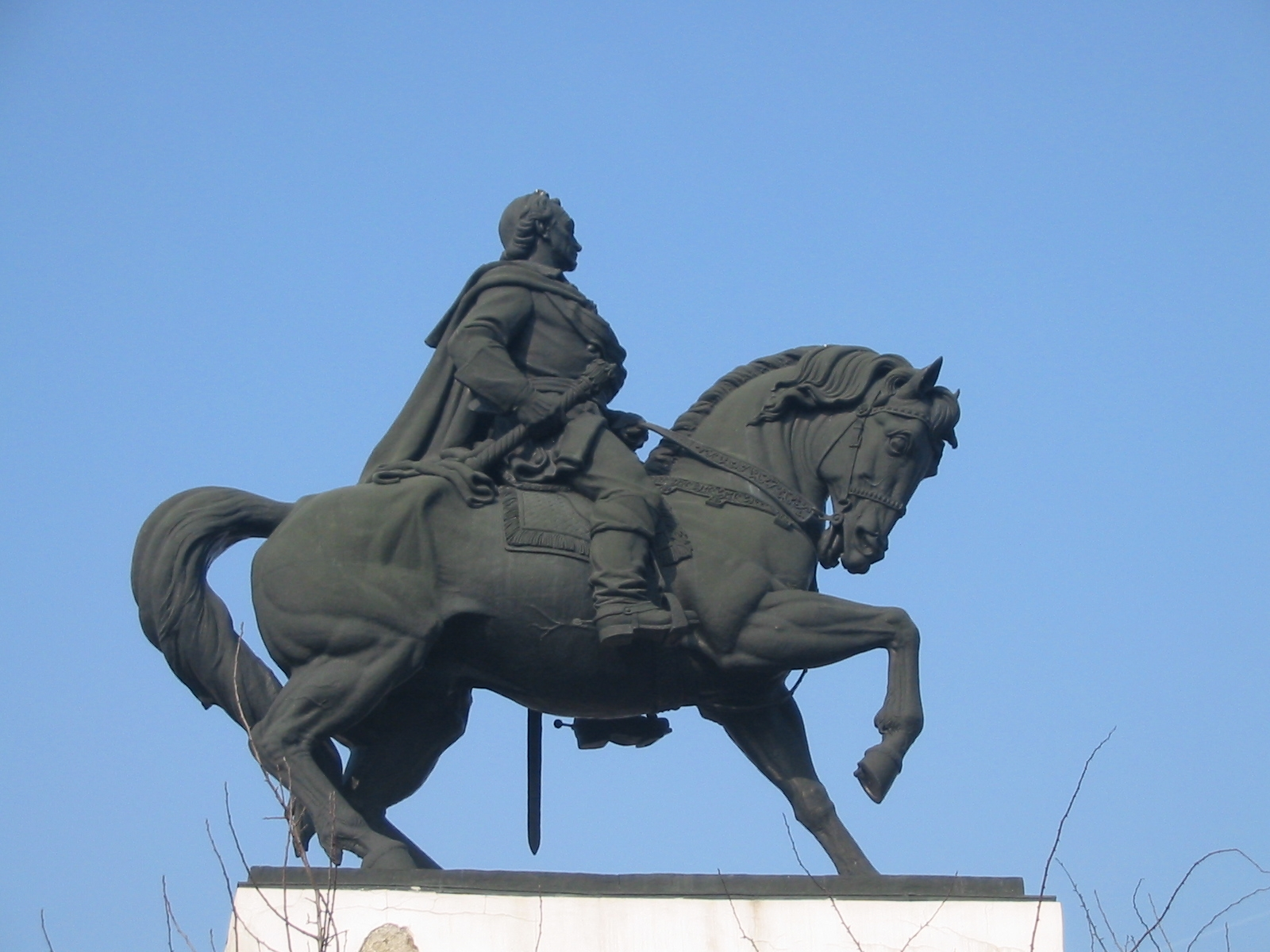
Suvorov guarding the Rymna River (monument)

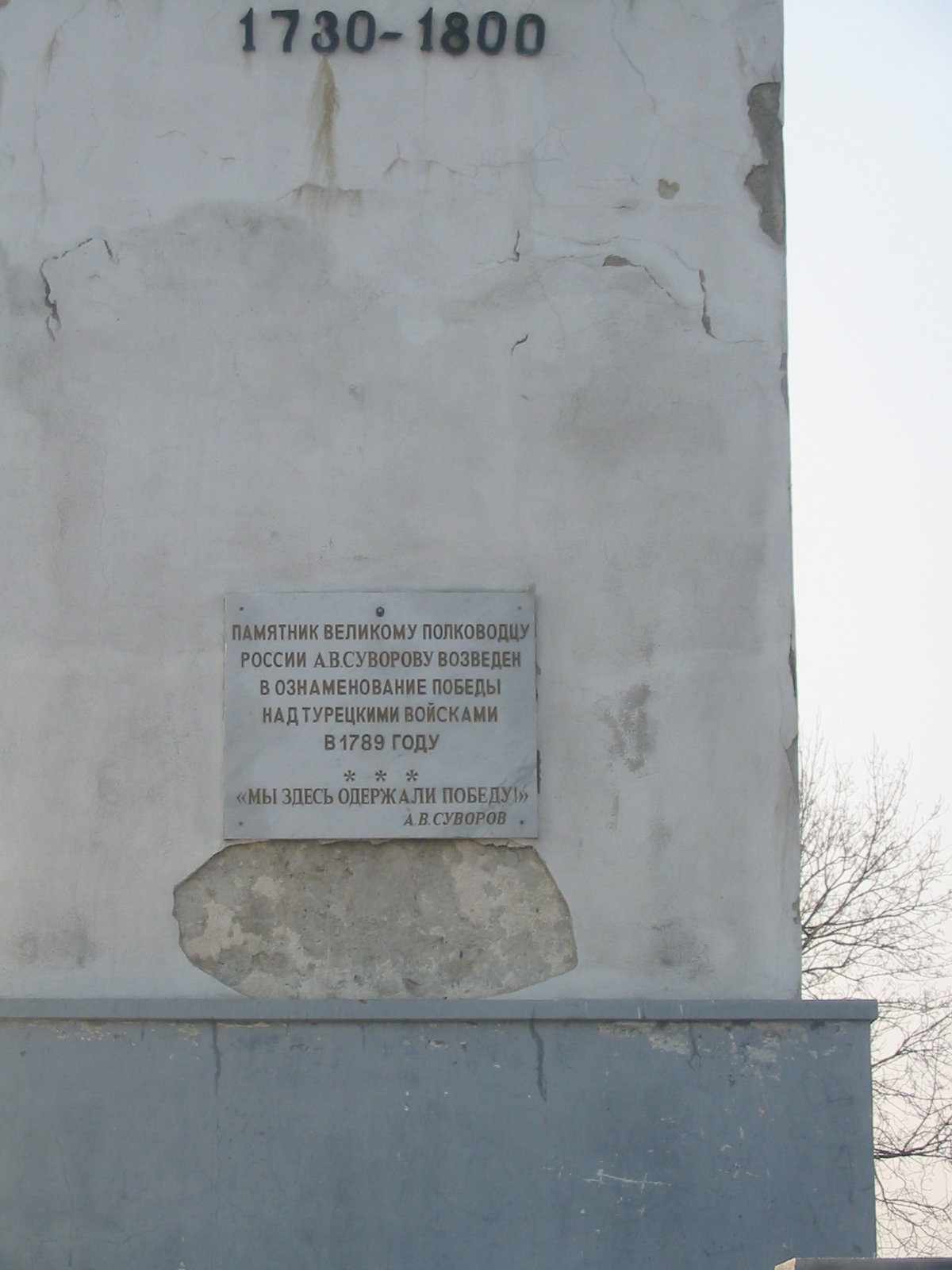
- Suvorov's monument – detail
- "We've won a victory here" (Suvorov)

== See also ==
- Battle of Kagul

== Notes and references ==
=== Works cited ===
- Dowling, Timothy C., ed. (2014). Russia at War. From the Mongol Conquest to Afghanistan, Chechnya, and Beyond. ABC-CLIO. ISBN 978-1598849479.
- Longworth, Philip (1966). The Art of Victory: The Life and Achievements of Field-Marshal Suvorov, 1729–1800. New York: Holt, Rinehart and Winston.
- Petrov, Andrey N. (1880). Вторая турецкая война в царствование императрицы Екатерины II. 1787–1791 г. [Second Turkish War in the reign of Empress Catherine II] (in Russian). Vol. II. St. Petersburg: Типография Р. Голике. pp. 56–74.
