= Austro-Turkish War (1788–1791) =

18th century military conflict

- Part of the Ottoman–Habsburg wars and Russo-Turkish War (1787–1792)
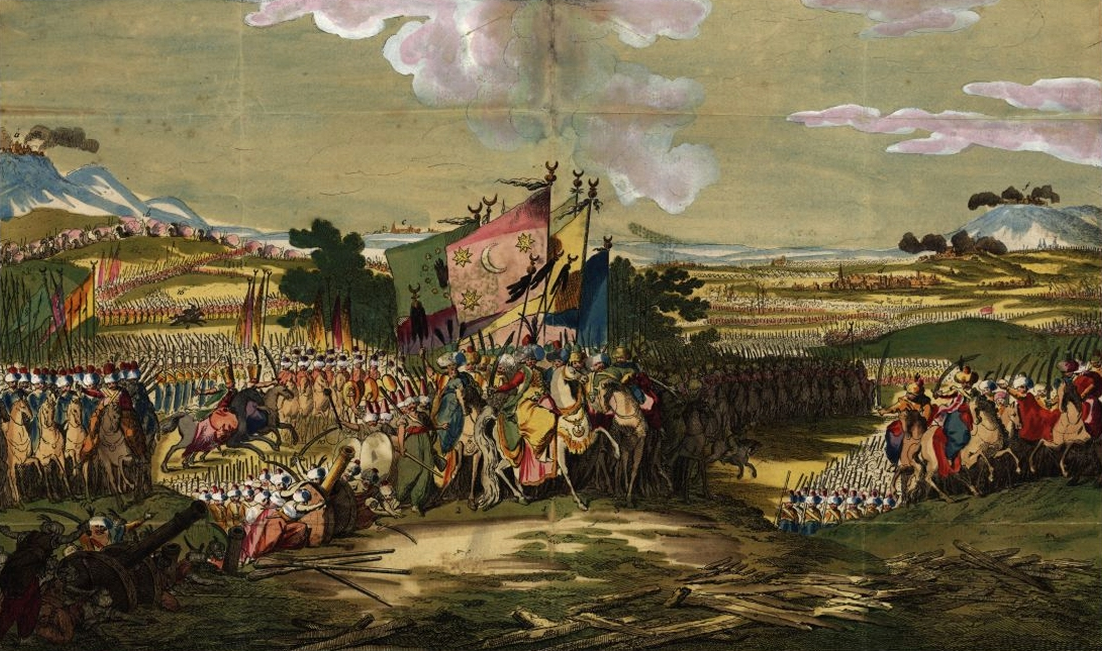
- The main Ottoman army led by the Grand Vizier with 80,000 men advancing from Sofia in May 1788
Date	February 1788 – 4 August 1791
Location	Southeastern Europe and Eastern Europe
Result	See Outcomes
Territorial changes	Ottoman Empire cedes Orșova and Croatian borderlands to the Habsburg monarchy

Belligerents
(Holy Roman Empire) Habsburg monarchy; Koča's frontier; Russian Empire	Ottoman Empire

Commanders and leaders
(Habsburg monarchy) Joseph II # (Habsburg monarchy) Leopold II (Habsburg monarchy) Ernst von Laudon # (Note: Died of natural causes at Nový Jičín on 14 July 1790) (Habsburg monarchy) Paul Kray (Habsburg monarchy) Maximilian of Merveldt (Habsburg monarchy) Anton Elsnitz (Habsburg monarchy) Eugène Argenteau (Habsburg monarchy) Franz Lauer (Habsburg monarchy) Andreas Ballinlough (Habsburg monarchy) Heinrich XV (Habsburg monarchy) Johann Schmitt (Habsburg monarchy) Karl Futak (Habsburg monarchy) Heinrich Bellegarde (Habsburg monarchy) Peter Bátorkéz (Habsburg monarchy) Franjo Jelačić (Habsburg monarchy) Antun Pejačević (Habsburg monarchy) Koča Anđelković (executed) (Habsburg monarchy) Joseph Colloredo (Habsburg monarchy) Charles Clement	Abdul Hamid I # Selim III; Cenaze Pasha; Koca Pasha

Strength
(Holy Roman Empire) 300,000	200,000 (Note: incl. the Russian front.)

The Austro-Turkish War, also known as the Habsburg–Ottoman War, was fought from 1788 to 1791, between the Habsburg monarchy and the Ottoman Empire. During the conflict, Habsburg armies succeeded in taking Belgrade (1789) and liberating much of central Serbia, also capturing several forts in central Croatia and in the Pounje region of Ottoman Bosnia. Much of those gains were lost in the later stages of the war, which ended under the Treaty of Sistova (1791), with minor territorial changes in favor of the Habsburgs. The war was fought concomitantly with the Russo-Turkish War (1787–1792).

== War aims ==
The war began soon after the breakout of the Russian-Turkish conflict. The Russian Empire, headed by Catherine the Great, had been involved in previous wars of conquest against the Ottomans, and the two nations were openly hostile. In August 1787, after "numerous Russian provocations" according to Hochedlinger, the Ottoman Empire declared war on the Russians. The Austrian Emperor Joseph II had concluded an alliance with the Russians in 1781, which (Hochedlinger) "obliged [him] to assist the Russians with his full might ... Vienna felt that it had to act promptly so as not to annoy the [Empress]. What Joseph had to make sure this time was that Austria did not come away empty-handed again, as over the Crimea in 1783–84".

In fact, Joseph was facing a serious threat to his rule in a distant portion of his empire, in what is now Belgium; as well as long-term tensions with a powerful northerly neighbor, Prussia. Hochedlinger opines that "war could not have come at a more inopportune moment".

Hochedlinger also judges the Turks also made a mistake in starting the war themselves. From the Russian point of view, "the conflict could now be presented to the European public as a defensive war against an aggressor. Turkish aggression also made it much more difficult for France to continue its traditional role as the Sultan's protector against Russian rapacity".

== Fighting ==
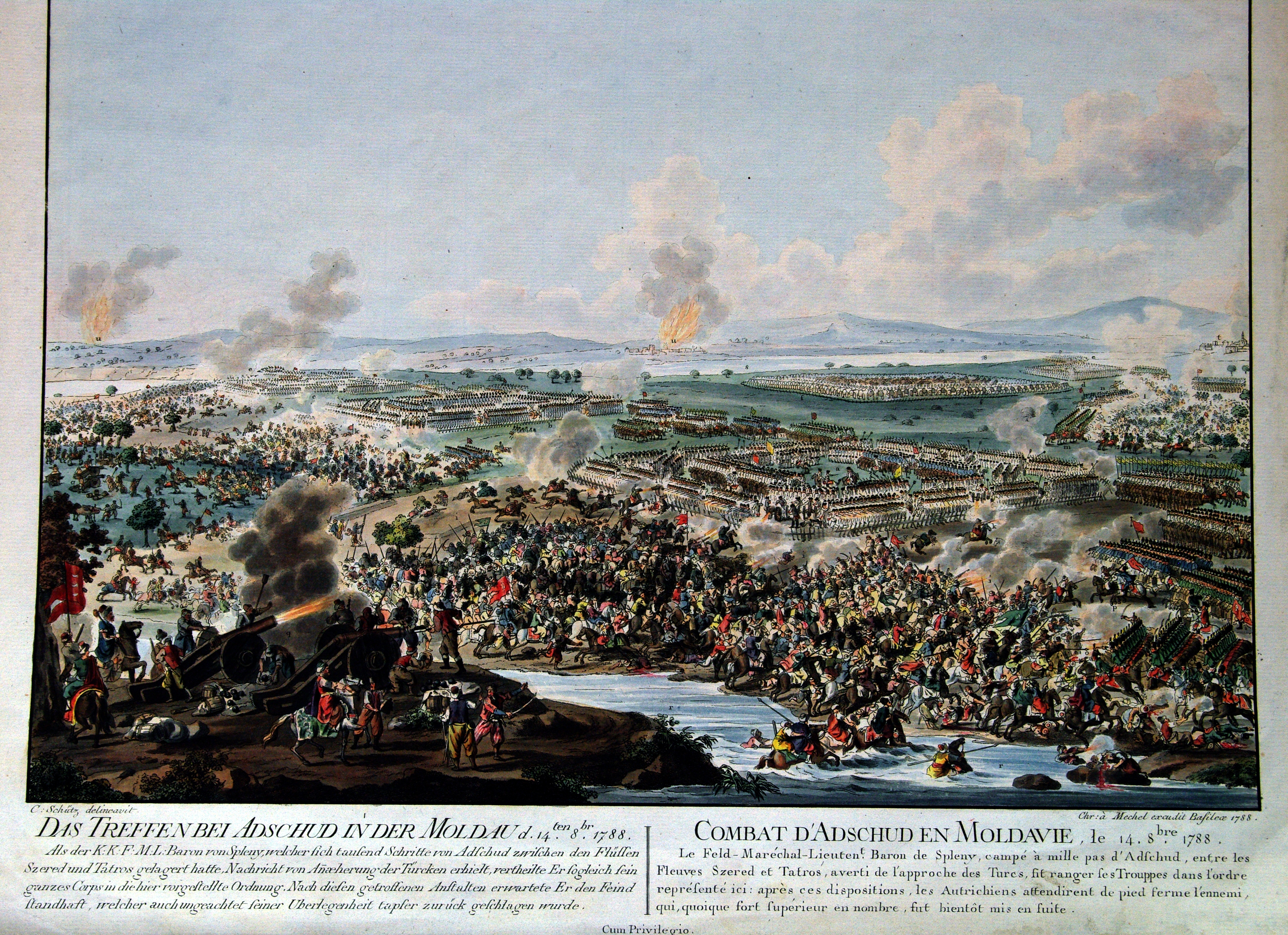
Battle of Adjud, 14 October 1788

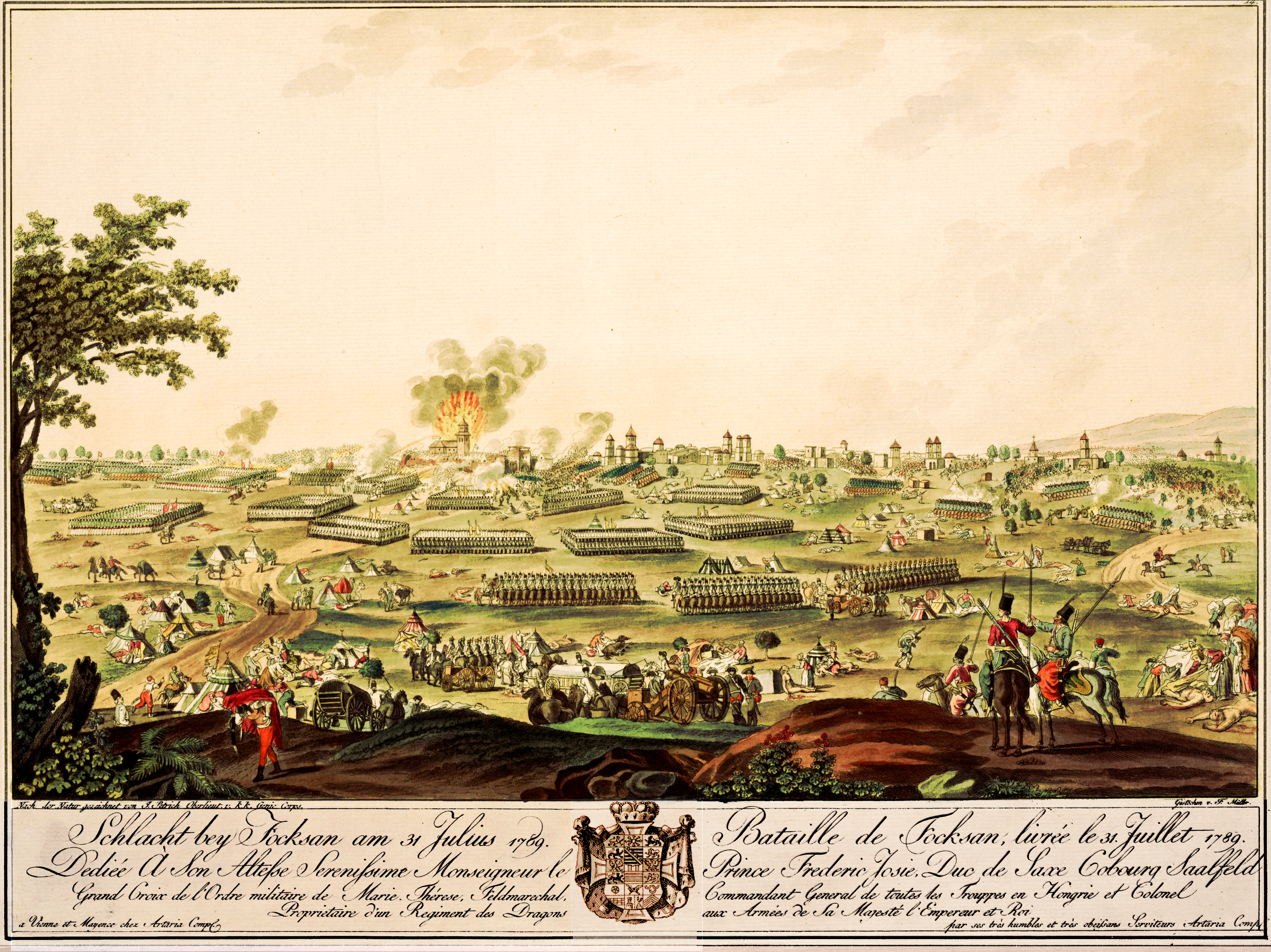
Clash between Russo-Austrian and Turkish troops in the Battle of Focșani

The Austrians entered the war in February 1788, though they had by now lost their best chance for an easy victory. The slow preparations of Russia resulted in the Ottoman concentration on Belgrade. The Austrians relied on Russian support in Moldavia, which only began in late 1788, and Joseph II seemed to have been reluctant to fight the Ottomans. In July, the Ottomans crossed the Danube and broke into the Austrian Banat.

Supply shortages hampered both sides, while disease struck the Austrian soldiers. As many as 50,000 Serb refugees flooded across the Danube, causing logistical problems for the Austrians. In mid-August, Joseph II dispatched 20,400 soldiers into the Banat. A Serbian Free Corps of 5,000 soldiers had been established in the Banat, composed of refugees that had fled earlier conflicts in the Ottoman Empire. The Corps would fight for liberation of Serbia and unification under Habsburg rule.

Later on, the balance shifted toward Austria: the Turks were expelled from parts of Croatia, the Banat, parts of Bosnia; and Belgrade was taken in a three-week campaign by the aging Field Marshal Laudon. Habsburg-occupied Serbia (1788–1791) was established. The Austrian army also decisively participated in the victories of Cetingrad under command of general de Vins, as well as of Focşani and Rymnik de facto under the overall command of Suvorov, and Josias of Saxe-Coburg conquered Bucharest.

== Disease ==
At the front, outbreaks of malaria and other diseases played a major role. According to Braunbehrens, in the Austrian army during 1788 there were "epidemics: the lazarettos were filled to capacity, half the army was sick, and thousands of soldiers died". Joseph II spent most of the war at the front, and was one of those who fell ill there; he ultimately died of his illness after his return home (20 February 1790).

== Outcomes ==
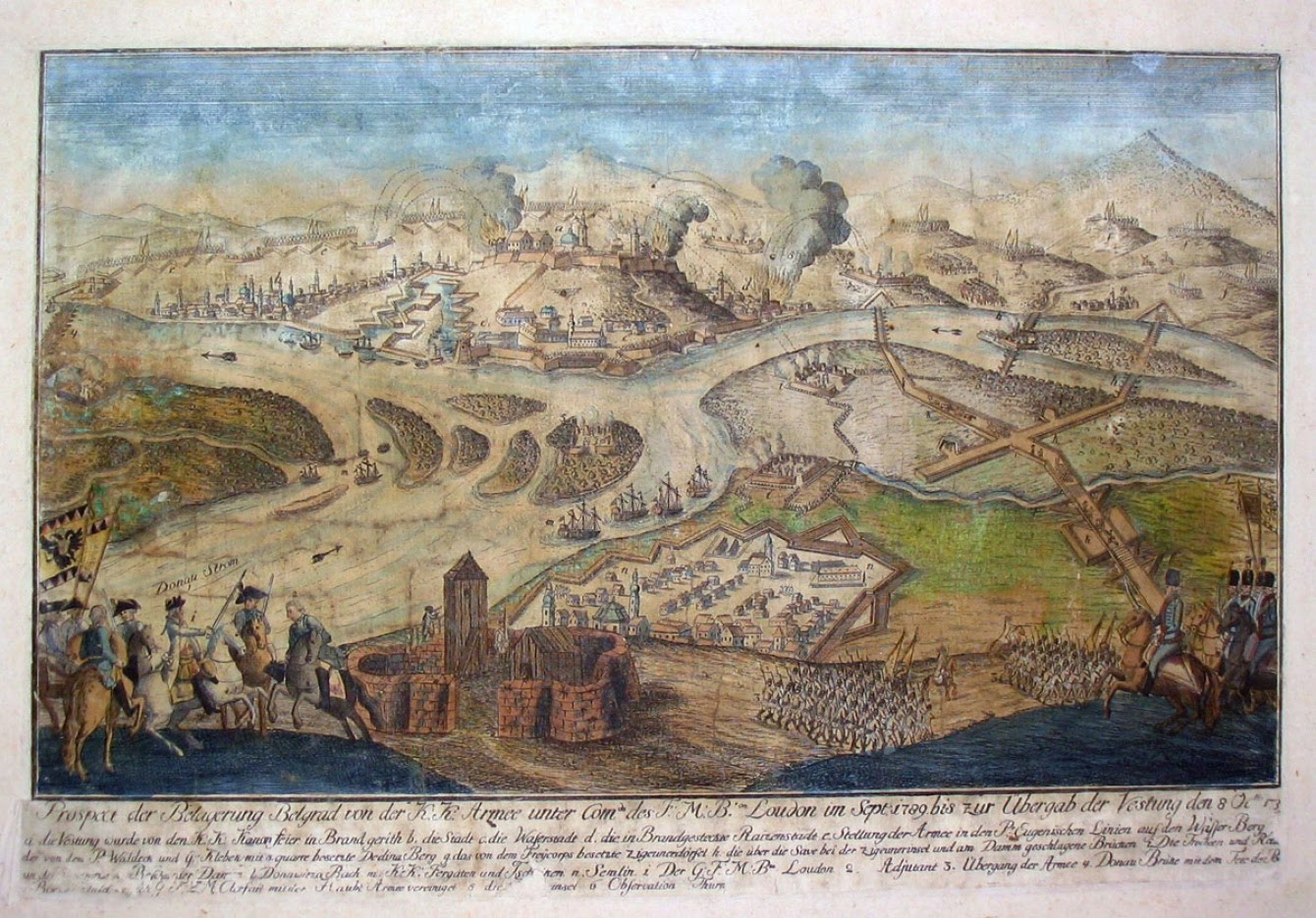
Siege of Belgrade in 1789. Austria restored Belgrade and other captured territories to the Ottomans.

Joseph's successor Leopold II was compelled to end the war due to the threat of Prussian intervention in support of the Ottomans. In the final negotiated outcome, established in the Treaty of Sistova of 4 August 1791, Austria's gains were "meagre": Austria returned all the territory from its conquests save the small town of Orsova and a strip of Croatian land near the Bosnian-Croatian border (e.g. Drežnik Grad, Cetin Castle, Donji Lapac, Srb). The Russians won new territory along the Black Sea and forced the Turks to acknowledge previous conquests in the Treaty of Jassy of 9 January 1792.

For the Ottomans, the war was a salient event in a long period of national decline (see Stagnation and reform of the Ottoman Empire). In 1791, the withdrawal of troops and warships to Europe led to the overthrow of Emir Ismail Bey in Egypt; and his successors, Murad Bey and Ibrahim Bey, established a regime independent of Istanbul.

Serbia had been under Ottoman rule before the war and was closely fought over, remaining an Ottoman possession after the final treaty settlement. The war was to have important consequences for the future history of Serbia. Rajić writes,

The wars of the 16th, 17th, and 18th centuries instilled in the Serbian consciousness the deep-seated expectation that only Austria could lend a helping hand [i.e., in liberating Serbia from the Ottomans]. This faith was largely shaken after Kočina Krajina and the last Austro-Turkish War (1788–1791), when it became clear that despite the Serbs' merits and heavy casualties in the fight against the Turks, the emperor abandoned them and made peace with the sultan. Since then, Russia superseded Austria in the Serbs' plans to restore their state.

For discussion of the fate of Serbia during the war, see Habsburg-occupied Serbia (1788–1791).

This treaty ended the Ottoman–Habsburg wars. In later years, the three countries involved participated in different military alignments. Russia continued to fight periodically against the Ottomans during the 19th and 20th centuries (see Russian-led wars against the Ottomans), but Austria did not participate in these conflicts. During the long period of the Napoleonic wars, which broke out soon after this war, Russia and Austria were generally allies aligned against France. During the Second Ottoman–Egyptian War, Austria, along with Britain, saved its old rival from early collapse against Muhammad Ali Pasha's Egypt. Lastly, the Ottoman and Austro-Hungarian empires fought as allies in the First World War, with Russia as a primary opponent; the Ottomans sent troops to Galicia and the Austro-Hungarians to Gaza; with the end of the war both empires came to an end.

== The home front in Austria ==
The war had serious negative effects on the economy of Austria, and derailed progress in creating a modern civil society. Calinger writes:

To have the time and financial resources to establish his domestic reforms, Joseph II needed stability in foreign affairs. It is a well-tested maxim that war stops reform. Joseph's predatory foreign policy, however, joined with that of Catherine II, led to a war against the Ottoman Turks from 1787 to 1790. This war devastated his domestic economy. The next year the national debt soared to 22 million gulden, and in 1790 it reached 400 million. As food prices and taxes rose and a new conscription was implemented, the mood in Vienna turned ugly. Bread riots erupted after the bad harvest of 1788/89 and the emperor's popularity plummeted.

Solomon writes that even "the morale of the cultural elite was severely eroded; fears of conscription led many aristocratic families to leave Vienna, and there were widespread feelings of disillusionment with Emperor Joseph, a sense that he had betrayed the promise of an enlightened reform movement."

== See also ==
- Habsburg-occupied Serbia (1788–1791)
- Battle of Karánsebes
- Battle of Mehadia
- Battle of Rymnik
- Siege of Belgrade (1789)
- Relief of Cetingrad

== Sources ==
- Aksan, Virginia H. (2013) [2007]. Ottoman Wars, 1700-1870: An Empire Besieged. London & New York: Routledge.
- Bataković, Dušan T., ed. (2005). Histoire du peuple serbe [History of the Serbian People] (in French). Lausanne: L’Age d’Homme. ISBN 9782825119587.
- Braunbehrens, Volkmar (1990) Mozart in Vienna. New York: Grove Weidenfeld.
- Bronza, Boro (2010). "The Habsburg Monarchy and the Projects for Division of the Ottoman Balkans, 1771-1788". Empires and Peninsulas: Southeastern Europe between Karlowitz and the Peace of Adrianople, 1699–1829. Berlin: LIT Verlag. pp. 51–62. ISBN 9783643106117.
- Calinger, Ronald (2003) "Reform absolutism of Joseph II in the Austrian monarchy in 1781", in George F. McLean, Robert R. Magliola, William Fox (eds.), Democracy: In the Throes of Liberalism and Totalitarianism. CRVP. Viewable on Google Books: .
- Ćirković, Sima (2004). The Serbs. Malden: Blackwell Publishing. ISBN 9781405142915.
- Hochedlinger, Michael (2013) [2003]. Austria's Wars of Emergence: War, State and Society in the Habsburg Monarchy, 1683–1797. London & New York: Routledge.
- Hupchick, Dennis P. (2002). The Balkans: From Constantinople to Communism. New York: Palgrave.
- Ingrao, Charles W. (2000) [1994]. The Habsburg Monarchy, 1618–1815 (2nd ed.). Cambridge: Cambridge University Press.
- Jelavich, Barbara (1983). History of the Balkans: Eighteenth and Nineteenth Centuries. Vol. 1. Cambridge University Press. ISBN 9780521252492.
- Radosavljević, Nedeljko V. (2010). "The Serbian Revolution and the Creation of the Modern State: The Beginning of Geopolitical Changes in the Balkan Peninsula in the 19th Century". Empires and Peninsulas: Southeastern Europe between Karlowitz and the Peace of Adrianople, 1699–1829. Berlin: LIT Verlag. pp. 171–178.
- Rajić, Suzana (2010). "Serbia – the Revival of the Nation-state, 1804–1829: From Turkish Provinces to Autonomous Principality". Empires and Peninsulas: Southeastern Europe between Karlowitz and the Peace of Adrianople, 1699–1829. Berlin: LIT Verlag. pp. 143–148.
- Solomon, Maynard (1995) Mozart: A Life. Harper Perennial.
- Stavrianos, Leften (2000) [1958]. The Balkans Since 1453. London: Hurst.
- Sugar, Peter F. (1996) [1977]. Southeastern Europe under Ottoman Rule, 1354-1804. Seattle: University of Washington Press.
- Mayer, Matthew Z. (2004). "The Price for Austria's Security: Part I–Joseph II, the Russian Alliance, and the Ottoman War, 1787–1789". The International History Review. 26 (2): 257–299.
- Osipov, Yuri S. (2015). Great Russian Encyclopedia (in Russian). Vol. 29.
