= Battle of Karánsebes =

Friendly fire incident of the Austro–Turkish War of 1787–1791

- Part of Austro-Turkish War (1788–1791)
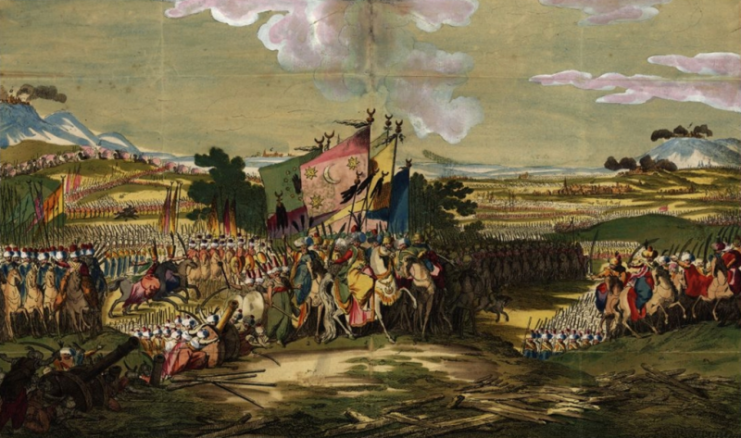
- Picture (drawn in 1795) showing Ottoman forces' decline to Karánsebes
Date	21–22 September 1788
Location	Caransebeș, near the Timiș River, modern day Romania
Result	Ottoman victory
Territorial changes	Capture of Karánsebes by the Ottomans

Belligerents
Habsburg monarchy	Ottoman Empire

Commanders and leaders
(Habsburg monarchy) Joseph II	(Ottoman Empire) Koca Yusuf Pasha (Ottoman Empire) Cenaze Hasan Pasha

Strength
80,000–100,000 soldiers	None

Casualties and losses
Between 150 and 10,000 killed or wounded	None

The Battle of Karánsebes (Turkish: Şebeş Muharebesi; German: Rückzug von Karánsebes; Hungarian: Karánsebesi csata; Romanian: Bătălia de la Caransebeș) was a friendly fire incident in the Austrian army, occurring during the night of 21–22 September 1788, during the Austro-Turkish War of 1788–1791. Some historians have referred to the battle as "history's worst friendly fire incident".

== Events ==
Different portions of the Austrian army, which were scouting for forces of the Ottoman Empire, fired on one another by mistake, causing self-inflicted casualties and severely disrupting the Austrian baggage train, during the night of 21–22 September 1788. The Ottomans took advantage and captured the city of Karánsebes (now Caransebeș, Romania):

On the march thither, the army was seized with a most unaccountable panic, believed themselves to be threatened by the enemy, fell into disorder, and mistook their own troops from the Sclavonian frontiers for enemies. The regiments fired upon one another looked everywhere for an enemy where in reality there was none, and all attempts on the part of the emperor in person to stop the firing and put an end to the confusion were in vain. He was in fact separated from his suite and wandered about ignorant of his way; it was even supposed that he had been taken prisoner when at length, accompanied by a single individual, he came to Karansebes. A detailed account of the singular story of this night-march and its consequences does not appear to us to belong to the province of general history; it will, however, be found both authentic and complete in the Austrian Military Magazine of 1831.

=== Historical uncertainty ===
Other sources include one from 1843, sixty years after the battle, which has made it difficult for some scholars to draw reliable sources and evidence for the detailed account of the battle.

At a minimum, the mere fact of the Ottoman capture of the strategic location, without engaging the Austrians and with Austrian losses reported in contemporary reports, suggests some significant friendly fire incident by the Austrian forces.

The paucity of records on the incident, in turn, might reflect an attempt by the Austrians to hide embarrassing details, or at least a lack of eagerness to share them.

=== Traditional narrative ===
The traditional narrative of the battle likely contains some exaggerations and embellishments to fill in the gaps in the history.

The Austrian army, approximately 100,000 strong, was setting up camp around the town. Their vanguard, a contingent of hussars, crossed the Timiș River to scout for the presence of the Ottoman army. There was no sign of the Ottomans, but the hussars came across a group of Romanians, who offered to sell them schnapps.

Soon afterwards, some infantry crossed the river. When they saw the party going on, the infantrymen demanded alcohol for themselves. The hussars refused to give them any of the schnapps and, still drunk, set up makeshift fortifications around the barrels. A heated argument ensued, and one soldier fired a shot.

Immediately, the hussars and infantry engaged in combat with one another. During the conflict, some Romanian infantry began shouting, "Turcii! Turcii!" ("Turks! Turks!"). The hussars fled the scene, thinking that the Ottoman army's attack was imminent. Most of the infantry also ran away; the army comprised Austrians, Romanians, Serbs from the Military Frontier, Croats, and Italians from Lombardy, as well as other minorities, many of whom could not understand one another. While it is not clear which one of these groups did so, they gave the false warning without telling the others, who promptly fled. The situation was made worse when officers, in an attempt to restore order, shouted, "Halt! Halt!" which was misheard by soldiers with no knowledge of German as "Allah! Allah!".

As the hussars fled through the camps, a corps commander, General of Artillery Colloredo, thought that it was a cavalry charge by the Ottoman army and ordered artillery fire. Meanwhile, the entire camp awoke to the sound of battle. The panic caused by the incident demoralised the Holy Roman Emperor Joseph II to the point that he ordered the army to withdraw.

Two days later, the Ottoman army arrived. They discovered dead and wounded soldiers and easily took Karánsebes.

== Losses ==
In determining losses, accounts of the incident do not distinguish between losses that were caused by friendly fire, those that were caused by the Turks, and those that resulted from pillaging by the Austrians or by the local Wallachians. One account states that the Austrian rear guard suffered 150 casualties. Another account states that in the days following the incident, 1,000 wounded men were taken to the fortress at Arad, 60 km (37 mi) north of Timișoara. Another source claims that 538 men, 24 jäger, and one officer went missing after the incident, but most returned to duty. Also lost were three cannons and the chest containing the army's payroll. However, secondary sources give much larger estimates as to the losses of the Austrians.

In his account of the incident, Paul Bernard, author of a 1968 biography of Holy Roman Emperor Joseph II, made an uncited claim that the friendly fire incident caused 10,000 casualties. Although Bernard's account of the war has been dismissed as inaccurate by some sources, they do not specifically touch upon the reliability of the figure of 10,000. Nevertheless, Bernard's claim of 10,000 casualties has been repeated by some historians such as Geoffrey Regan and Micheal Clodfelter.

Although tens of thousands of casualties occurred within the Austrians' ranks during the course of the 1788 campaign against the Turks, official Austrian reports state that the vast majority of the casualties were the result of disease, particularly malaria and dysentery.

== See also ==
- Gideon, who led the Israelites to cause a similar friendly fire incident in the Midianites camp, according to the Book of Judges.
- Operation Wikinger
- List of friendly fire incidents

== Bibliography ==
- Regan, Geoffrey (2000). The Brassey's Book of Military Blunders. Washington, D.C.: Brassey's. ISBN 1-57488-252-X. Relevant excerpt on Google Books.
- Durschmied, Erik (2000). The Hinge Factor: How Chance and Stupidity Have Changed History. Arcade Publishing. ISBN 978-1-55970-515-8. Relevant excerpt on Google Books.
- Schlosser, F.C. (1843). History of the Eighteenth Century and of the Nineteenth Century till the Overthrow of the French Empire. Vol. 6. Translated by Davison, D. London, England: Chapman and Hall. p. 162.
- Gross-Hoffinger, Anton Johann (1847). Geschichte Josephs des Zweiten [History of Joseph the Second] (in German). Leipzig, Germany: Carl B. Lorck. pp. 292–294.
- Mayer, Matthew Z. (1997). Joseph II and the campaign of 1788 against the Ottoman Turks (Master's thesis). Montreal, Quebec, Canada: Joe McGill University. pp. 61–62.
- Gramm, Ernst Rainer (2008). Der unglückliche Mack: Aufsteig und Fall des Karl Mack von Leiberich [The misfortunate Mack: Rise and fall of Karl Mack von Leiberich] (PDF) (Doctoral thesis) (in German). Vienna University. pp. 82–84.

=== Contemporary sources ===
- Gross, Johann Heinrich (7 October 1788). "Zur Kriegsgeschichte" [On the history of the war]. Real Zeitung (in German). Erlangen, Bavaria, Germany. pp. 723–729.
- "Aus dem Feldlager der Hauptarmee, bey Sakul, vom 23. Septr." [From the encampment of the main army, near Sacu, 23 September]. Bayreuther Zeitungen (in German). Bayreuth, Bavaria, Germany. 7 October 1788. pp. 847–848.
- "VI. Türkische Angriffe auf das Kaiserliche Lager. Action bey Slatina. Rückzug der Kaiserlichen Armee. Einnahme der Festung Choczim. Anderweitige Begebenheiten des Türkenkriegs." [VI. Turkish attacks against the Emperor's camp. Action near Slatina. Retreat of the Emperor's army. Taking of the fortress at Khotyn. Other events of the Turkish war.]. Politisches Journal: nebst Anzeige von gelehrten und andern Sachen [Political Journal, including notices of scholarly and other works] (in German). Vol. 2. 1788. pp. 1052–1070.
- "Foreign Intelligence". The European Magazine and London Review. No. 14. October 1788. p. 308.
- "Du Quartier-Général de l'Armée principale, près de Sakul, le 23. Septembre." [From the encampment of the main army, near Sacu, 23 September]. Supplement aux Nouvelles Extraordinaires de Divers Endroits [Supplement to Extraordinary News from Various Places] (in French). Leiden, Netherlands. 14 October 1788.
- "Da Trieste 3. Ottobre. N.LVIII Supplemento Straodinario della Gazzetta di Vienna del 1. Ottobre" (From Trieste 3 October. no. 58 Special supplement to the Vienna Newspaper of 1 October), Notizie del mondo (Florence and Venice, (Italy)), no. 82, p. 654 (11 October 1788). (in Italian)

=== Recounts ===
- "III. Geschichte des Feldzugs 1788 der k.k. Hauptarmee gegen die Türken (Fortsetzung)" (III. History of the 1788 campaign of the imperial main army against the Turks (continuation)), Oestreichische militärische Zeitschrift (Austrian military journal), 4 : 58–70 (1831); see especially pp. 58–65. (in German)
- Criste, Oskar, Kriege unter Kaiser Josef II. Nach den Feldakten und anderen authentischen Quellen bearbeitet in der kriegsgeschichtlichen Abteilung des k. und k. Kriegsarchivs [Wars under Emperor Joseph II. According to the campaign documents and other authentic sources, edited in the War History Department of the Imperial and Royal War Archives] (Vienna, Austria: L. W. Seidel & Sohn, 1904),"IX. Rückzug des kaiserlichen Heeres nach Lugos, September 1788." (IX. Retreat of the imperial army to Lugoj, September 1788.), pp. 301–308. (in German)
