= Theodor Hosemann =

German painter

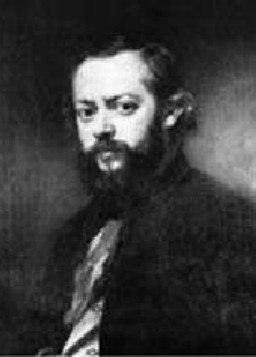
Self-portrait (1855)

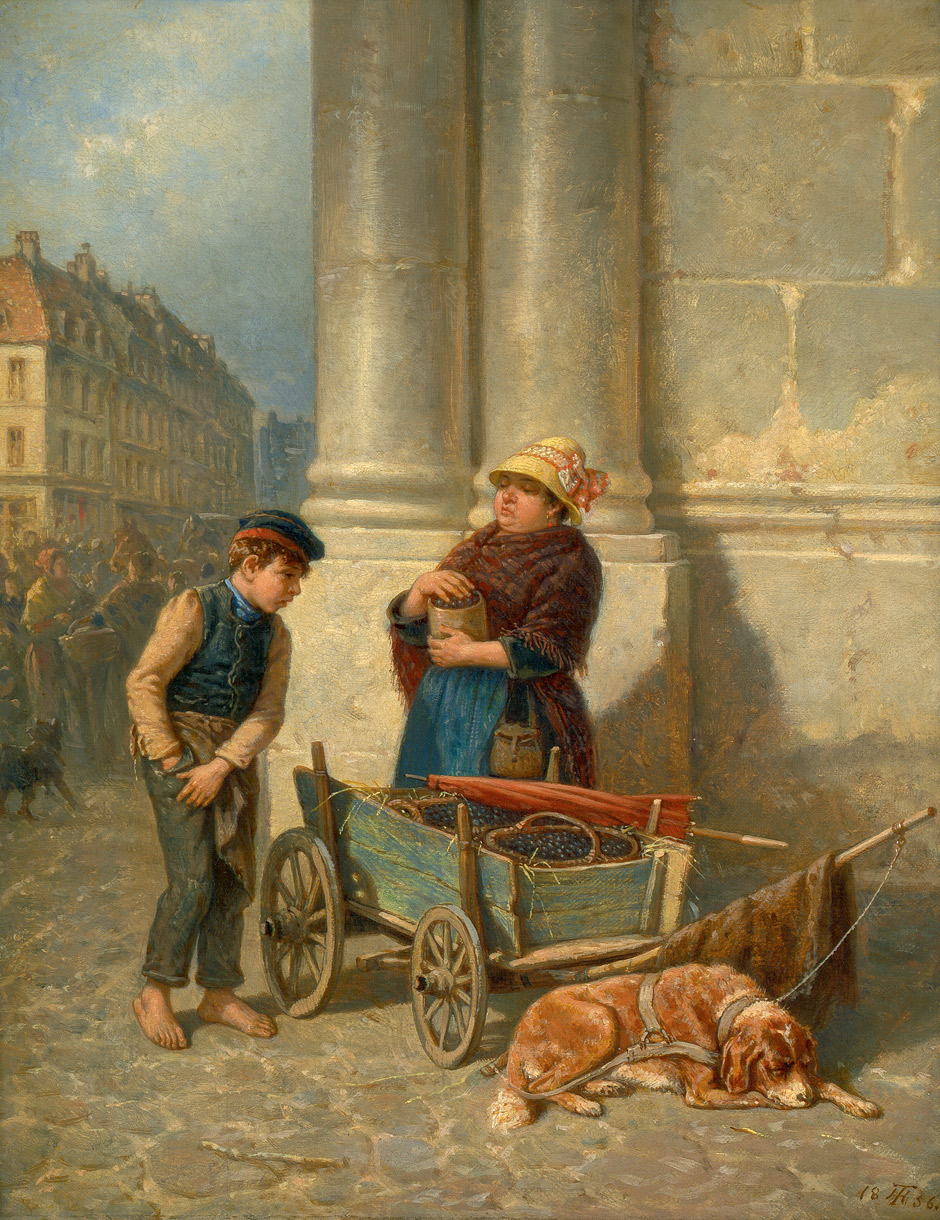
The Plum Seller (1856)

Friedrich Wilhelm Heinrich Theodor Hosemann (24 September 1807, in Brandenburg an der Havel – 15 October 1875, in Berlin) was a German genre painter, draftsman, illustrator and caricaturist.

== Life ==
Hosemann was the son of an officer in the Prussian Army and moved about frequently until, at the age of twelve, he was apprenticed to the lithography firm of Arnz & Winckelmann in Düsseldorf. Three years later, he was already employed as a draftsman earning a salary of 200 Thalers annually. At the same time, he also attended the Düsseldorf Art Academy.

In 1828, Winckelmann went into business on his own, later forming a publishing company called Winckelmann and Sons in Berlin. Hosemann went with him as Chief Illustrator for double his previous salary. That year, he provided many drawings for children's books and by 1830 was well known for his humorous drawings. He was soon providing illustrations for several publishers. From 1834 to 1852, he enjoyed a fruitful collaboration with the satirist Adolf Glassbrenner; most notably a series of 32 books entitled Berlin wie es ist und – trinkt (Berlin As It Is and - Drunk).

From 1842 to 1855, he was a member of a literary society called Tunnel über der Spree, where he was known as "Hogarth". In the 1850s, he was also associated with the group Rütli, editing their yearbook and providing engraved illustrations.

In 1857, he was appointed a professor at the Prussian Academy of Arts and became a full member in 1860. The well-known illustrator and photographer Heinrich Zille was one of his students.

In 1910, a street in the Pankow district of Berlin was named in his honor.

== Illustrations ==
A large collection of his illustrations have been digitalized by the University and State Library Düsseldorf, including the collected works of E. T. A. Hoffmann:

- E. T. A. Hoffmann’s gesammelte Schriften. Mit Federzeichnungen von Theodor Hosemann. Reinmer, Berlin 1857.
  - Bd. 3: Die Serapion-Brüder.
  - Bd. 4: Die Serapion-Brüder.
  - Bd. 5: Nachtstücke.
  - Bd. 6: Die Elixiere des Teufels: Nachgelassene Papiere des Bruders Medardus, eines Capuziners.
  - Bd. 7: Fantasiestücke in Callot’s Manier: Blätter aus dem Tagebuch eines reisenden Enthusiasten.
  - Bd. 8: Lebens-Ansichten des Katers Murr: nebst fragmentarischer Biographie des Kapllmeistern Johannes Kreisler in zufälligen Makulaturblättern.
  - Bd. 11: E.T.A. Hoffmann’s Erzählungen aus seinen letzten Lebensjahren: Theil 1.
  - Bd. 12: E.T.A. Hoffmann’s Erzählungen aus seinen letzten Lebensjahren: Theil 2.

The complete collection may be found in the corresponding article on German Wikipedia.

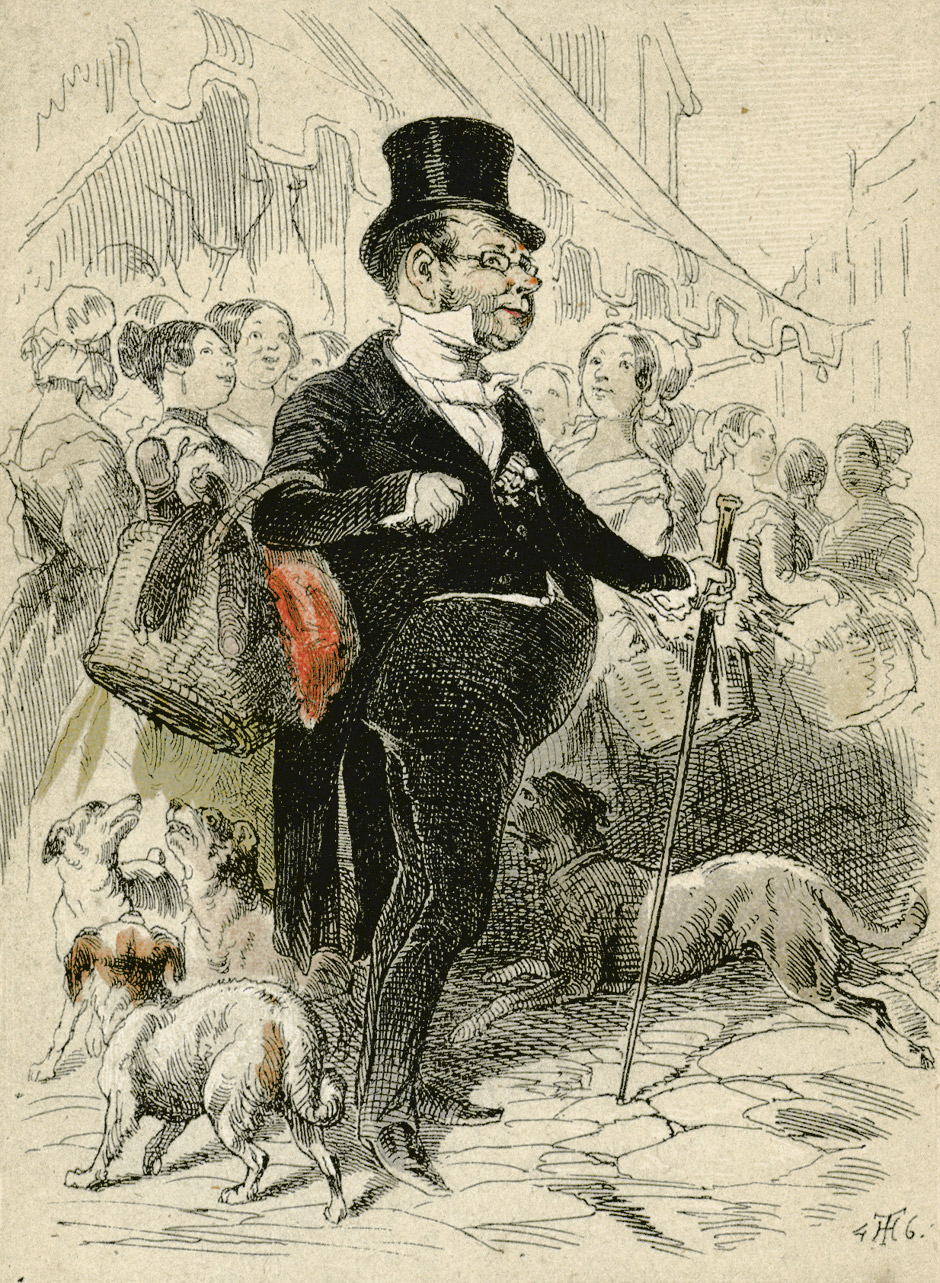
From Wien wie es ist by Gross-Hoffinger

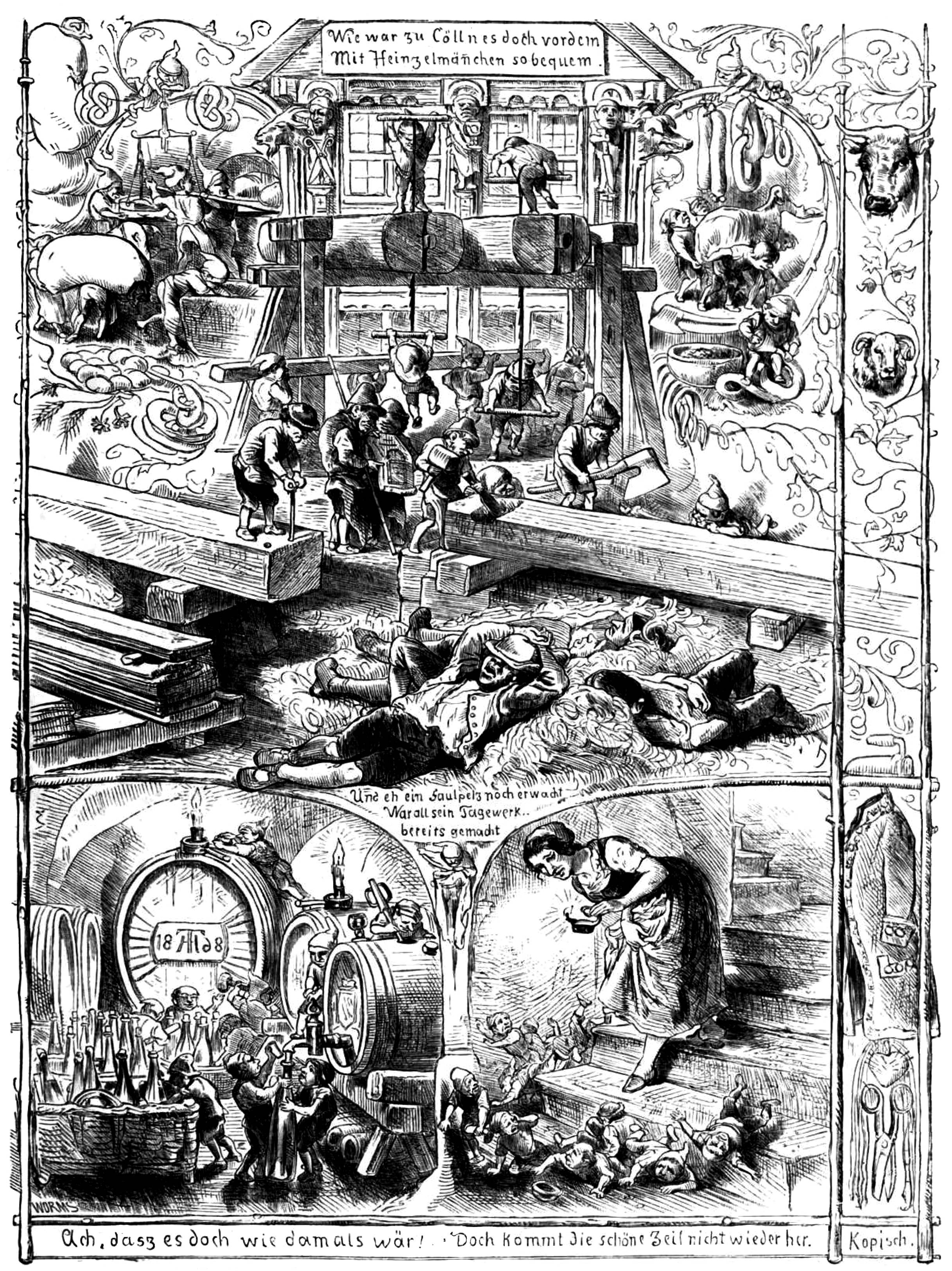
For the poem Die Heinzelmännchen by Kopisch

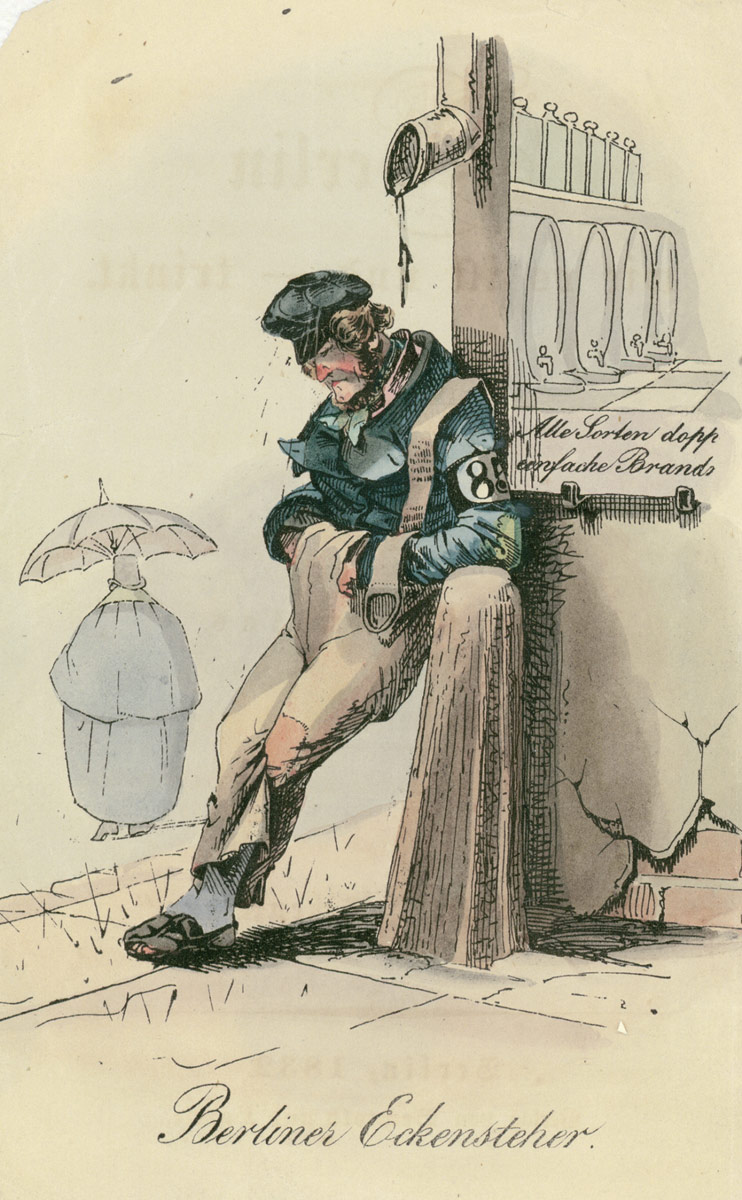
The Loiterer (Eckensteher) from Berlin wie es ist

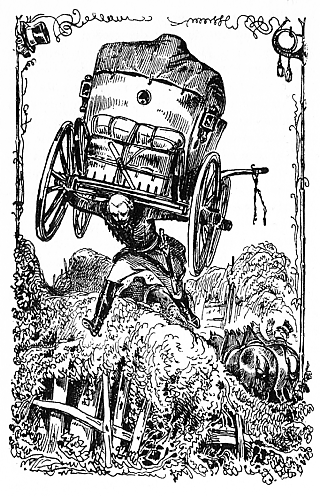
From Münchhausen by Bürger

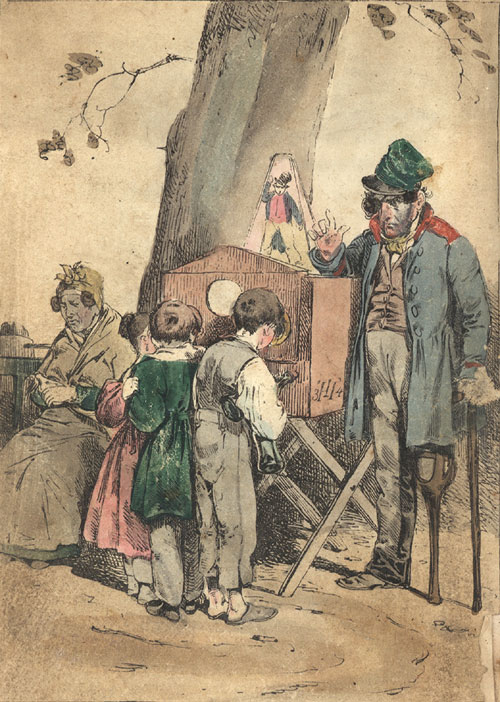
The Peep-show from Berlin wie es ist
