= Treaty of Jassy =

1792 treaty between Russia and the Ottoman Empire

- The region ceded to Russia (striped)
- Type: Peace treaty
- Signed: 9 January 1792 (Gregorian cal.); 29 December 1791 (Julian cal.).
- Location: Iași, Moldavia
- Signatories: (Russian Empire) Alexander Bezborodko; (Ottoman Empire) Koca Yusuf Pasha
- Parties: Russian Empire; Ottoman Empire
- Languages: Russian, Ottoman Turkish

The Treaty of Jassy, signed at Iași (Jassy) in Moldavia (present-day Romania), was a pact between the Russian and Ottoman Empires ending the Russo-Turkish War of 1787–92 and confirming Russia's increasing dominance in the Black Sea.

The treaty was signed on 9 January 1792 (O.S.: 29 December 1791) by Grand Vizier Koca Yusuf Pasha and Prince Bezborodko (who had succeeded Prince Potemkin as the head of the Russian delegation when Potemkin died). It confirmed the Treaty of Küçük Kaynarca of 1774, wherein the Ottomans had ceded suzerainty over the Crimean Khanate to Russia. Yedisan (the territory between the Dniester and the Southern Bug rivers) was transferred to Russia, establishing the Dniester as the Russo-Turkish frontier in Europe, while leaving the Asiatic frontier (Kuban River) unchanged. The Ottomans also acknowledged Georgia (the Kingdom of Kartli-Kakheti) as a Russian protectorate.

The signing of peace was strongly influenced by the storming of the Ottoman fortress of Izmail by commander Alexander Vasilyevich Suvorov-Rymniksky.

== See also ==
- List of treaties
