= Battle of Mehadia =

1788 battle during the Austro-Turkish War

Battle of Mehadia (1788)
- Part of Austro-Turkish War (1788–1791)
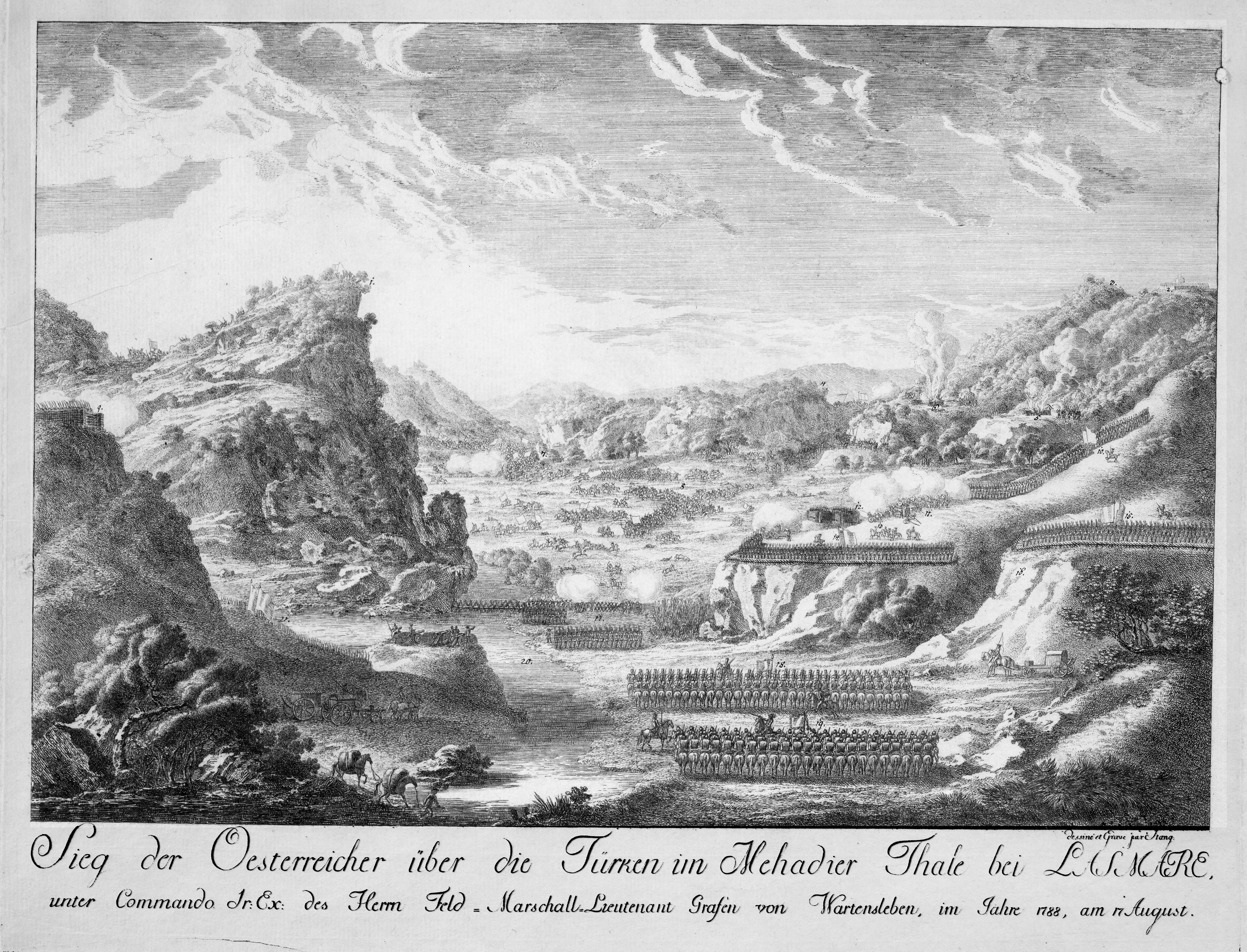
- Battle of Mehadia (1788)
Date	17–28 August 1788
Location	Mehadia, Banat
Result	Ottoman victory

Belligerents
Habsburg monarchy	Ottoman Empire

Commanders and leaders
(Habsburg monarchy) Wilhelm von Wartensleben	Koca Yusuf Pasha

Strength
In total: 15 battalions 14 squadrons	70,000 men

Casualties and losses
Unknown	Unknown

The battle of Mehadia broke out during the Austro-Turkish War of 1788–1791. It took place in August 1788 during the offensive of the Ottoman army of Yusuf Pasha in Banat. The Ottomans managed to capture the Habsburg position and force them to retreat.

== Prelude ==
After the outbreak of the Austro-Turkish War in 1788, the Ottoman army of 70,000 men led by Grand Vizier Koca Yusuf Pasha invaded Banat on August 7 after forcing the Habsburgs to raise the siege of Belgrade. At Mehadia, there was a Habsburg force led by Wilhelm von Wartensleben, which consisted of 7 battalions and 12 squadrons and was reinforced by the Emperor to 15 battalions and 14 squadrons; not all of them, though, were present at Mehadia. On August 4, the Ottomans crossed the Danube and began bombarding a Habsburg army camp led by General Papilla, which consisted of Wallachian cavalry at Szupany.

Papilla did not attempt to prevent the Ottomans from crossing but instead withdrew to Mehadia north; however, on August 7, he was ambushed by the Ottomans, killed several of them, and captured 13 cannons left by them. Papilla managed to break through. The Habsburg emperor, Joseph, criticized Papilla for this.

Joseph's primary concern was the safety of Wartensleben's camp at Mehadia. The breach of the line of defense at Szupany exposed him to enemy attack and made his line of supply vulnerable. Joseph marched to help Wartensleben's camp.

== Battle ==
On August 17, while the Ottomans were chasing Papilla to Mehadia, they dispatched a vanguard consisting of 5,000 men to attack the fortified position of the Bánság corps south of Mehádia at Lazu Mare. This attack failed, and the Ottomans suffered 500 casualties. Wartensleben sent urgent messages to the emperor asking for help, which did not arrive. On August 25, the main Ottoman army finally arrived at the scene and began bombarding the Imperial camp with a large amount of artillery.

The Imperials managed to resist the Ottomans for days; however, on August 28, the Ottomans changed their plan and concentrated their forces on the fortification on the Imperial left flank. The Ottomans launched two attacks against this fortification, but despite the resistance of the Lattermann regiment, the Ottomans managed to destroy the fortification, which forced the imperials to retreat. This allowed the Ottomans to maneuver the Imperials and attack them from behind. Realizing this, Wartensleben was forced to retreat on August 29.

== Aftermath ==
As Wartensleben was retreating, the emperor had not heard of him for 4 days, wondering if he was attacked or waiting for his arrival. He finally managed to rendezvous with him in Caransebeș. The Emperor criticized Wartensleben for making his position dependent on one fortification.

== Sources ==
- Matthew Z Mayer, Joseph II and the campaign of 1788 against the Ottoman Turks.
- Oscar Criste, Wars under Emperor Josef II. Edited according to field files and other authentic sources in the military history department.
- József Bánlaky: Military history of the Hungarian nation (MEK-OSZK), 0014/1149. The campaign of 1788.
