= Cenaze Hasan Pasha =

Grand Vizier of the Ottoman Empire (1789)

Cenaze / Meyyit · Kethüda Hasan Pasha

Grand Vizier
- In office 12 May 1789 – 2 December 1789
- Monarch: Selim III
- Preceded by: Koca Yusuf Pasha
- Succeeded by: Cezayirli Gazi Hasan Pasha

Personal details
- Died: 1810 Larissa, Ottoman Greece

Cenaze Hasan Pasha (Adyghe: Хьэсэн-Пащэ "Джэназэ"; also known as Meyyit Hasan Pasha or Kethüda Hasan Pasha; died 1810) was a short-term Ottoman grand vizier in 1789. His epithet Cenaze (or Meyyit) means "corpse" because he was ill when appointed to the post.

He was instrumental in putting down the Orlov revolt and was successful during the Austro-Turkish War of 1788–1791. Due to his previous military success, he was promoted to Grand Vizier in 1789 and led Ottoman troops during the Russo-Turkish War of 1787–1792. However, he was notably defeated by Alexander Suvorov at the Battle of Rymnik, despite outnumbering the Russian general's forces greatly.

== Early years ==
He was a Circassian servicing in various positions in the Ottoman Empire. He was the acting governor of Tripoliçe (now in Greece) in 1770 during the Russo-Turkish War (1768–1774). He defended the town against a Russia-backed rebellion. Upon this success he was promoted. While he was the governor of Vidin (now northwest Bulgaria) he took part in the Battle of Karánsebes in the scope of the Russo-Turkish War (1787–1792) and contributed to the victory.

== As a grand vizier ==
On 28 May 1789, he was appointed as the grand vizier (highest rank of the empire other than that of the sultan). But he was sick in bed when he received the sultan's letter of appointment, and so he was nicknamed Cenaze (corpse). On 22 September he personally led the army against the Austrian-Russian alliance in the Battle of Rymnik (called Boze by the Turks), but he was defeated. After this defeat he was dismissed on 2 December 1789.

== Later years ==
He was appointed as the governor of Rusçuk (now Ruse in Bulgaria). But later he was exiled to Bozcaada (a Turkish island). In 1792, he was pardoned and appointed as the governor of Silistra (now in Bulgaria). Later he was transferred to various cities such as Chania, Heraklion (both in Crete island), Bender (now in Moldova) and Khotyn (now in Ukraine). While he was in Khotyn, he fell prisoner to the Russians in the newly begun Russo-Turkish War (1806–1812). After the peace treaty, he retired and died in Larissa in 1810.

== See also ==
- List of Ottoman grand viziers

Preceded by Koca Yusuf Pasha	Grand Vizier; 12 May 1789 – 2 December 1789	Succeeded by Cezayirli Gazi Hasan Pasha
