= Anton Johann Gross-Hoffinger =

Austrian geographer, lexicographer, author and publisher (1808–1875)

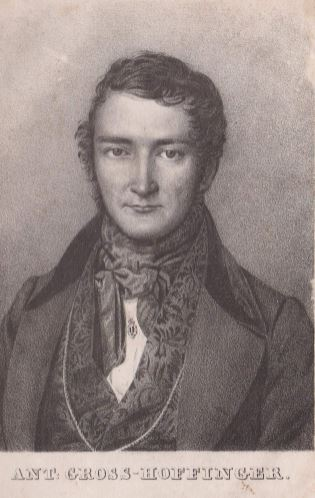
Anton Johann Gross-Hoffinger (1836)

Anton Johann Gross-Hoffinger (22 May 1808 – 26 August 1875) was an Austrian geographer, lexicographer, author and publisher. He wrote under the pseudonym Hans Normann, as well as several variations of his true name.

== Biography ==
Gross-Hoffinger was born on 22 May 1808 in Vienna, Austrian Empire. He was born to the merchant Anton Gross and his wife, Anna Maria (née Hoffinger). In 1816, they moved to České Budějovice. After graduating from secondary school there, he attended the Schottengymnasium; he then studied geography and history at the University of Vienna while devoting himself to journalism and writing. Following the wishes of his parents, he chose not to graduate and enlisted as a Cadet in the "Line Infantry Regiment Archduke Ludwig", which was based in Jihlava. He served until 1828, when he was released as unfit for duty.

That same year, he attempted to climb the Großglockner, but was unsuccessful. He then continued his studies in Munich, Leipzig and Gießen, obtaining his Doctorate of Philosophy in 1834. During that period, in 1832, he published his first work, together with the bookseller Carl Bruggemann, in Halberstadt: the Neuestes Conversationslexikon für alle Stände.

He returned to Vienna in 1837 and found some financial backers for his next project, a news, entertainment and arts journal called Der Adler (The Eagle), which appeared in 1838, under the aegis of the Wiener Zeitung. It was initially successful, but soon flagged, so he changed its name to Vindobona (the Roman name for Vienna). Sales did not improve, and he was forced to cease publication in 1844.

Shortly after, he left Vienna and returned to Germany. Little is known of him from this period, except for his writings, mostly historical in nature, which were voluminous. He apparently travelled, almost continuously. In 1857, he returned to Vienna, where he wrote novels and lived in poverty. His last published works date from the 1860s. At some point, he returned to Germany. He died on 26 August 1875 in Breslau, at the age of 67.
