= Koca Yusuf Pasha =

Grand Vizier of the Ottoman Empire (1786–1789, 1791–1792)

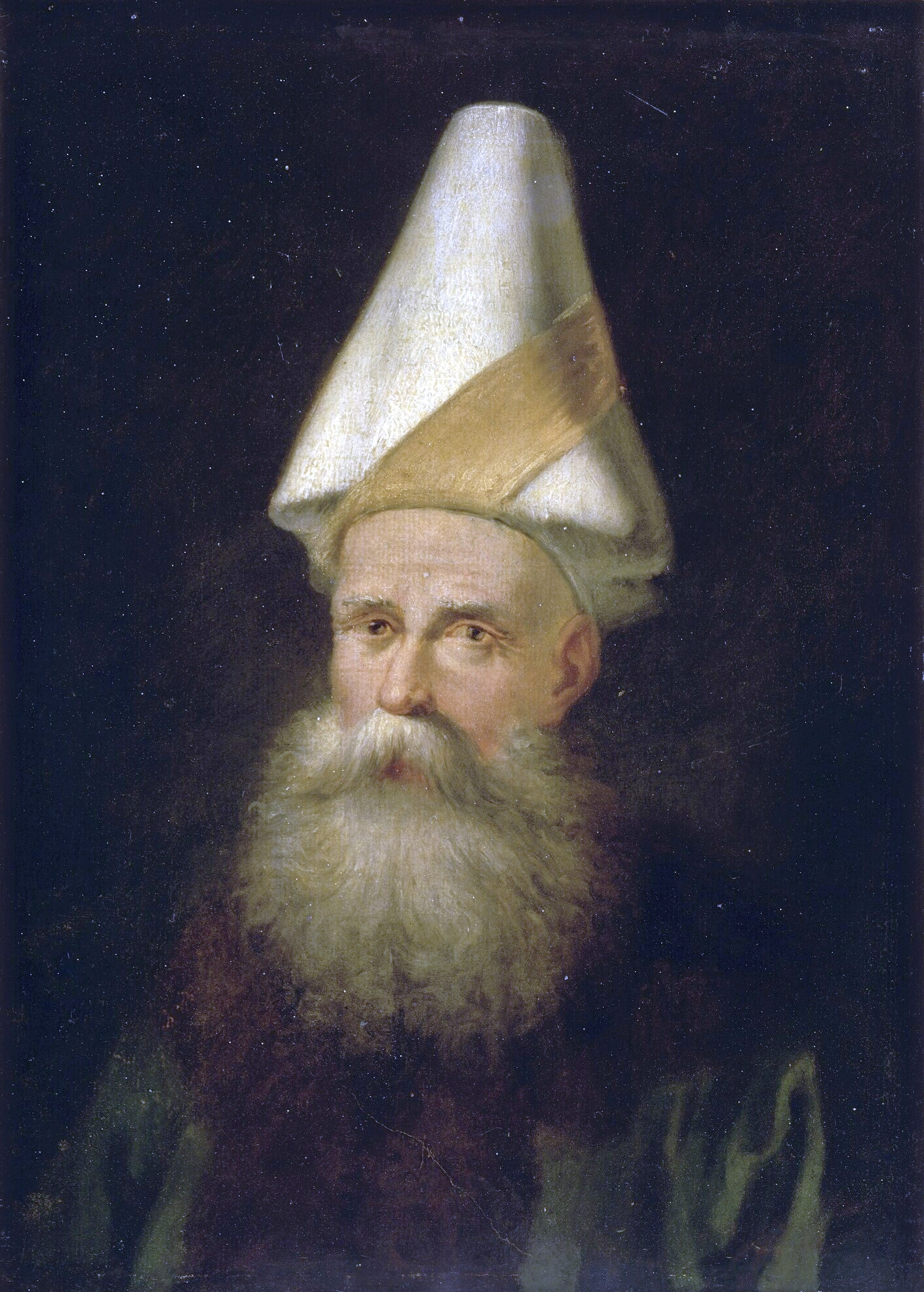
Koca Yusuf Pasha

Koca Yusuf Pasha was an Ottoman statesman. He was grand vizier from 25 January 1786 to 28 May 1789 (during reign of Abdul Hamid I), and Kapudan Pasha (Grand Admiral of the Ottoman Navy) after 19 December 1789. He became grand vizier again, this time serving from 12 February 1791 until mid-1792 (during reign of Selim III). He is considered to be one of the best Ottoman commanders of his time period.

He was a Georgian convert to Islam and also served as the governor of the Peloponnese.

== See also ==
- List of Ottoman grand viziers
- Battle of Mehadia

Political offices
Preceded by Hazinedar Şahin Ali Pasha	Grand Vizier of the Ottoman Empire; 25 January 1786 – 28 May 1789	Succeeded by Cenaze Hasan Pasha
Preceded by Çelebizade Şerif Hasan Pasha	Grand Vizier of the Ottoman Empire; 12 February 1791 – 1792	Succeeded by Melek Mehmed Pasha
