= List of cultural heritage monuments in Székesfehérvár =

As of January 2019, there were 139 registered cultural heritage monuments in Székesfehérvár, and three were being evaluated for the status.

== List of cultural heritage monuments ==
under evaluation for official status

| KÖH registry number | Reference number | Name (Hungarian name) | Image | Address | Coordinates | Notes |
|---|---|---|---|---|---|---|
| 3850 | 10272 | Árpád bathhouse (Árpád fürdő) | | Kossuth Street 12. Várkörút 25. | 47.190492°N 18.411701°E | Built in 1905. |
| 3899 | 1507 | Bajzáth House (Bajzáth-ház) | | Szent István Square 5. | 47.188083°N 18.4126001°E | cca. 1800 |
| 3814 | 1481 | Budenz House, Ybl Museum (Budenz-ház, Ybl Múzeum) | | Arany János Street 12. | 47.190011°N 18.410317°E | Zopfstil (a late Rococo style originating from Germany), 1781 |
| 3878 | 1577 | Cistercian Secondary School (Cisztercita gimnázium) | | Oskola Street 7. | 47.192967°N 18.408200°E | Eclectic style, cca 1870. Designed by Ferenc Brein. |
| 3914 | 9693 | Memorial (Emlékmű) | | Városház Square | 47.191000°N 18.409100°E | Memorial of the Tenth Hussars cavalry regiment of Székesfehérvár; sculptor: Pál Pátzay |
| 3893 | 10389 | Lutheran church (Evangélikus templom) | | Szekfű Gyula Street 1. | 47.195800°N 18.410067°E | Designed by Gyula Sándy, 1930. |
| 3827 | 1534 | Black Eagle Pharmacy Museum (Fekete Sas Patikamúzeum) | | Fő Street 5. | 47.1929°N 18.409083°E | 18th century |
| 3803 | 1471 | Black Eagle Inn (Fekete Sas Szálló) | | Ady Endre Street 7. | 47.193550°N 18.408250°E | cca. 1820 |
| 3872 | 1542 | Roman Catholic parish hall of the upper town (Felsővárosi római katolikus plébániaház) | | Móri Street 18–20. Dániel Street corner | 47.200467°N 18.408983°E | late Baroque, 1781 |
| 3868 | 1540 | Roman Catholic parish church of the upper town (Felsővárosi római katolikus plébániatemplom) | | Móri Street | 47.201389°N 18.413903°E | Baroque |
| 3917 | 1555 | Franciscan monastery (Ferences rendház) | | Városház Square 4. | 47.191517°N 18.409567°E | Baroque, 1741–1743 |
| 3875 | 1574 | Font-Caraffa House (Font-Caraffa-ház) | | Oskola Street 2–4. Jókai Street 1–3. | 47.191583°N 18.408750°E | Late Baroque |
| 3817 | 1483 | Gerchard House (Gerchard-ház) | | Basa Street 1. | 47.193567°N 18.409783°E | Romantic, cca 1860 |
| 3887 | 1550 | Serbian Orthodox church (Szerb ortodox templom, rác templom) | | Rác Street | 47.190500°N 18.401767°E | Baroque, 1770–1772, designed by János Kerschhoffer. |
| 3834 | 1512 | Hiemer House (Hiemer-ház) | | Jókai Street 1. | 47.191333°N 18.408350°E | Rococo, 1760–1770 |
| | 11701 | Jewish hospice (Izraelita szeretetház) | | Várkörút 19. | 47.191700°N 18.412000°E | |
| 3828 | 1535 | Jesuit- Pauline- later the Cistercian monastery (Jezsuita-, pálos-, majd cisztercita rendház) | | Fő Street 6. | 47.192817°N 18.409267°E | 1744–1763, Baroque; with Rococo stucco |
| 3808 | 9711 | Statue of Domonkos Kalmáncsehy (Kalmáncsehy Domonkos-szobor) | | Arany János Street | 47.190567°N 18.409633°E | Statue of Domokos Kálmáncsehi |
| 11366 | 11041 | Chapel (Kápolna) | | Rózsa Street 5. | 47.192683°N 18.409400°E | Ruins of the Saint Cross Chapel |
| 3884 | 1545 | Carmelite monastery; priest's home (Karmelita kolostor; papi otthon) | | Petőfi Street 2. | 47.189433°N 18.411500°E | |
| 3936 | 9262 | Kégl Mansion and its park (Kégl-kastély és parkja) | | Csalapuszta | 47.229850°N 18.495333°E | Designed by Alajos Hauszmann, Neo-Renaissance |
| 3867 | 1539 | Royal Well, residential building (Királykút, lakóház) | | Mikszáth Kálmán Street 25. | 47.199633°N 18.412950°E | Zopfstil, cca 1790 |
| | 12056 | Residential building (Lakóépület) | | Koronázó Square 3. és 4. | 47.191517°N 18.410400°E | |
| 3801 | 10836 | Residential building (Lakóház) | | Ady Endre Street 1. Fő Street corner | 47.193650°N 18.409100°E | Late Eclectic, 19th century; second floor: 1936, designed by Ferenc Say |
| 3802 | 10831 | Residential building (Lakóház) | | Ady Endre Street 5. | 47.193567°N 18.408600°E | Baroque origins, eclectic, second half of the 19th century |
| 3804 | 1472 | Residential building, Hübner–Reh House (Lakóház, Hübner–Reh-ház) | | Ady Endre Street 8. | 47.193650°N 18.407450°E | Late Classical, cca 1840 |
| 3805 | 1473 | Residential building (Lakóház) | | Ady Endre Street 11. | 47.193700°N 18.407467°E | Eclectic style |
| 3805 | 1473 | Residential building (Lakóház) | | Ady Endre Street 13. | 47.193700°N 18.407467°E | Eclectic style |
| 3809 | 1476 | Residential building, Fridetzky House (Lakóház, Fridetzky-ház) | | Arany János Street 3. | 47.190500°N 18.409500°E | Classicism, first half of the 19th century; facade redesigned in 1938. |
| 3810 | 1477 | Residential building (Lakóház) | | Arany János Street 5. | 47.190383°N 18.409700°E | Late Baroque, cca 1800. Altered in 1938. |
| 3811 | 1478 | Residential building (Lakóház) | | Arany János Street 8. | 47.190117°N 18.410050°E | Baroque, 18th century; built using parts of the medieval city wall. Partially altered in 1938. |
| 3815 | 1482 | Residential building; Klosz House, Pauer House (Lakóház; Klosz-féle ház, Pauer-ház) | | Arany János Street 16. | 47.189667°N 18.410433°E | Eclectic, second half of the 19th century |
| 3816 | 10837 | Residential building (Lakóház) | | Arany János Street 19. | 47.189650°N 18.410683°E | Eclectic, cca 1860 |
| 3818 | 1484 | Residential building (Lakóház) | | Basa Street 2. | 47.193700°N 18.409617°E | Baroque, 18th century. Partially altered in the first half of the 19th century in Classic style. |
| 3819 | 1485 | Residential building, Fligl-Krén House (Lakóház, Fligl-Krén-ház) | | Bástya Street 1. | 47.192817°N 18.410100°E | Late Baroque, from the end of the 18th century; facade altered. |
| 3823 | 1532 | Residential building (Lakóház) | | Fő Street 1. Rózsa Street 1. | 47.192467°N 18.409133°E | Classic style, cca 1820 |
| 3824 | 10832 | Residential building (Lakóház) | | Fő Street 2. | 47.192250°N 18.409083°E | Baroque origins, Classic-Eclectic style, cca 1870 |
| 3825 | 10838 | Residential building (Lakóház) | | Fő Street 3. | 47.192967°N 18.409183°E | Baroque origins, Classic-Eclectic style, from the end of the 19th century; altered |
| 3826 | 1533 | Residential building, Flits House (Lakóház, Flits-ház) | | Fő Street 4. Oskola Street 5. | 47.192267°N 18.409283°E | Zopfstil, from the end of the 18th century. Partially altered in the second half of the 19th century in Romantic style. |
| 3830 | 10833 | Residential building (Lakóház) | | Fő Street 9. | 47.193350°N 18.409217°E | Medieval and Baroque origins, Romantic style, 1850. Altered in Eclectic style in the 19-20th centuries. |
| 3832 | 10839 | Residential building (Lakóház) | | Fő Street 11. | 47.193967°N 18.409400°E | Late Eclectic style, from the end of the 19th century. |
| 3833 | 1538 | Residential building, Galla House (Lakóház, Galla-ház) | | Fő Street 13. | 47.194700°N 18.409333°E | From the 18th century; now in early Classical style, cca 1810 |
| 3837 | 1515 | Residential building (Lakóház) | | Jókai Street 5. | 47.191800°N 18.408000°E | Medieval origins, some details from the 15th century; Zopfstil style, 1780–1790 |
| 3838 | 1516 | Residential building (Lakóház) | | Jókai Street 6. | 47.191800°N 18.408000°E | Zopfstil, cca 1790 körül. Facade altered in Romantic style in the second half of the 19th century. City wall. |
| 3844 | 10840 | Residential building (Lakóház) | | Kossuth Street 3. | 47.190683°N 18.410567°E | Baroque, 18th century. Altered multiple times in the 19th and 20th centuries. |
| 3845 | 10841 | Residential building (Lakóház) | | Kossuth Street 5. | 47.190700°N 18.411017°E | Romantic style |
| 3846 | 1521 | Residential building (Lakóház) | | Kossuth Street 7. | 47.190550°N 18.411367°E | Romantic style, 1860–70 |
| 3847 | 10326 | Residential building (Lakóház) | | Kossuth Street 9. | 47.190367°N 18.410900°E | From the 14th–15th centuries with Gothic elements, restructured in the 18th century, with a clockwork on its facade. |
| 3849 | 10327 | Residential building (Lakóház) | | Kossuth Street 11. | 47.190150°N 18.411067°E | Baroque, mid-18th century; altered |
| 3851 | 1523 | Residential building (Lakóház) | | Kossuth Street 13. | 47.190050°N 18.411500°E | Zopfstil, end of the 18th century; altered |
| 3853 | 1525 | Residential building (Lakóház) | | Lakatos Street 12. | 47.192433°N 18.409967°E | Zopfstil, end of the 18th century; altered |
| 3854 | 1526 | Residential building (Lakóház) | | Lépcső Street 1. Liszt Ferenc Street 2. | 47.190283°N 18.408900°E | Baroque, 18th century |
| 3856 | 1528 | Residential building (Lakóház) | | Liszt Ferenc Street 4. Lépcső Street 2. | 47.190183°N 18.408667°E | Zopfstil, cca 1790, altered |
| 3857 | 1529 | Residential building (Lakóház) | | Liszt Ferenc Street 9. | 47.190150°N 18.408617°E | Baroque, 18th century, altered |
| 3860; 3935(?) | 8784; 1563(?) | Residential building, Karl House (Lakóház, Karl-ház) | | Mátyás király Boulevard 23. Zichy Grove 4. | 47.195633°N 18.409433°E | Baroque origins, altered in the second half of the 19th century. |
| 3861 | 1488 | Residential building (Lakóház) | | Megyeház Street 4. Arany János Street 3. | 47.190467°N 18.409183°E | Baroque, 18th century |
| 3862 | 1489 | Residential building (Lakóház) | | Megyeház Street 7. | 47.190250°N 18.409283°E | Baroque, early 18th century. Facade altered in Zopfstil style around 1790. |
| 3864 | 1491 | Residential building (Lakóház) | | Megyeház Street 9. | 47.190117°N 18.409583°E | Baroque, early 18th century. Facade altered in Zopfstil style around 1790. |
| 3865 | 1492 | Residential building, House with Eye of Providence motif (Lakóház, Istenszemes ház) | | Megyeház Street 11. | 47.189950°N 18.409650°E | Baroque, 18th century. Facade altered. |
| 3874 | 1573 | Residential building (Lakóház) | | Oskola Street 1. | 47.194183°N 18.408933°E | Baroque, 18th century |
| 3876 | 1575 | Residential building (Lakóház) | | Oskola Street 3. | 47.192200°N 18.408533°E | Baroque, cca 1750. Altered at the end of the 19th century. |
| 3877 | 1576 | Residential building (Lakóház) | | Oskola Street 6. | 47.191950°N 18.408683°E | Birthplace of Ignác Goldziher; originates from the 14-15th century; restructured, two medieval buildings were joined. Currently in Baroque style, from the 18th century. |
| 3879 | 1578 | Residential building (Lakóház) | | Oskola Street 8. | 47.192050°N 18.408583°E | Baroque, 1793, altered significantly |
| 3881 | 10842 | Residential building (Lakóház) | | Oskola Street 12. | 47.192633°N 18.408417°E | Eclectic and Art Nouveau, cca 1900. |
| 3890 | 10835 | Residential building (Lakóház) | | Rózsa Street 2. Fő Street corner | 47.19276°N 18.40914°E | 18th century; Classical style cca 1850; altered |
| 3895 | 1503 | Residential building, post office (Lakóház, posta) | | Szent István Square 1. Kossuth Street 20. | 47.189117°N 18.412100°E | Classical style, cca 1830; city wall |
| 3900 | 1508 | Residential building (Lakóház) | | Szent István Square 6. | 47.187883°N 18.412750°E | Zopfstil, cca 1800; city wall |
| 3902 | 8829 | Residential building (Lakóház) | | Szent István Square 10. | 47.188817°N 18.411383°E | Classical style, first half of the 19th century; city wall |
| 3903 | 1510 | Residential building (Lakóház) | | Szent István Square 12. | 47.189050°N 18.410983°E | Baroque, 18th century. Facade altered; city wall |
| 3904 | 1511 | Residential building (Lakóház) | | Szent István Square 13. | 47.189133°N 18.410817°E | Baroque origins, early Eclectic style from the second half of the 19th century. City wall. |
| 3905 | 10843 | Residential building (Lakóház) | | Szent János Passage 2. Fő Street corner | 47.192617°N 18.409000°E | Eclectic style |
| 3908 | 1562 | Residential building (Lakóház) | | Vasvári Pál Street 5. Virág Street 2. Táncsics Street 3. (sarok) | 47.191383°N 18.410950°E | Late Baroque, cca 1780. Altered in Eclectic style in the second half of the 18th century. |
| 3910 | 1561 | Residential building (Lakóház) | | Várkapu Street 6. | 47.194350°N 18.408917°E | Late Baroque, end of the 18th century; altered |
| 3916 | 1553 | Residential building (Lakóház) | | Városház Square 2. or 3. | 47.190950°N 18.409083°E | Zopfstil, cca 1790 |
| 3921 | 1567 | Residential building (Lakóház) | | Vörösmarty Mihály Square 4. | 47.187283°N 18.412967°E | Late Romantic, second half of the 19th century |
| 3922 | 1568 | Residential building (Lakóház) | | Vörösmarty Mihály Square 5. | 47.186683°N 18.413267°E | Romantic, cca 1860 |
| 3923 | 1569 | Residential building (Lakóház) | | Vörösmarty Mihály Square 6. | 47.187167°N 18.413117°E | Romantic, cca 1860. Possibly designed by Miklós Ybl. |
| 3925 | 1571 | Residential building (Lakóház) | | Vörösmarty Mihály Square 10. | 47.186717°N 18.413750°E | Romantic, cca 1860. Possibly designed by Miklós Ybl. |
| 3926 | 1572 | Residential building (Lakóház) | | Vörösmarty Mihály Square 12. | 47.186550°N 18.413950°E | Early Romantic, cca 1850 |
| 3929 | 1496 | Residential building (Lakóház) | | Zichy Grove 3. | 47.196133°N 18.408550°E | Romantic-Eclectic, second half of the 19th century. |
| 3930 | 1497 | Residential building (Lakóház) | | Zichy Grove 4. | 47.196433°N 18.408300°E | Romantic, cca 1850 |
| 3931 | 1498 | Residential building (Lakóház) | | Zichy Grove 5. Ybl Miklós Street 7. | 47.196667°N 18.408117°E | Classical style, cca 1840. Restructured at the end of the 19th century. |
| 3932 | 1499 | Residential building, Varga House (Lakóház, Varga-ház) | | Zichy Grove 6. Ybl Miklós Street 9. | 47.196850°N 18.407983°E | Classical style, cca 1840. Restructured at the end of the 19th century. |
| 3933 | 1500 | Residential building, Zichy House (Lakóház, Zichy-ház) | | Zichy Grove 7. | 47.197083°N 18.407883°E | Early Eclectic, cca 1870 |
| 3934 | 1501 | Residential building; Labour Court (Lakóház; Munkaügyi Bíróság) | | Zichy Grove 10. | 47.197883°N 18.408183°E | Eclectic, cca 1880 |
| 3935 | 1563 | Residential building (Lakóház) | | Mátyás király Boulevard 23. | 47.195683°N 18.409433°E | Eclectic, second half of the 19th century |
| 11720 | 11208 | Residential building (Lakóház) | | Juhász Gyula Street 1. | 47.191750°N 18.409067°E | |
| 11913 | 11209 | Residential building (Lakóház) | | Megyeháza Street 5. | 47.190467°N 18.409200°E | |
| 3848 | 10834 | Residential building, Peacock House, city wall (Lakóház, Pávás-ház és városfal) | | Kossuth Street 10. | 47.190733°N 18.411383°E | Art Nouveau, cca 1900. Parts of the city wall. |
| 3835 | 1513 | Residential building and remains of a hammam (bathhouse) (Lakóház és török fürdő romjai) | | Jókai Street 2. | 47.191317°N 18.408367°E | Baroque, 18th century, altered. Remains of a hammam (bathhouse) and the city wall in its backyard. |
| 3820 | 1486 | Residential building and city wall (Lakóház és városfal) | | Bástya Street 3–5. | 47.193000°N 18.409900°E | Classical, cca 1820; city wall remains in the backyard. |
| 3839 | 1517 | Residential building and city wall (Lakóház és városfal) | | Jókai Street 8. | 47.191583°N 18.408033°E | Baroque origins, current state in Eclectic style, second half of the 19th century; city wall |
| 3840 | 1518 | Residential building and city wall (Lakóház és városfal) | | Jókai Street 10. | 47.191967°N 18.407967°E | Built in the 18th century from several medieval houses in Baroque style; city wall |
| 3858 | 1530 | Residential building and city wall (Lakóház és városfal) | | Liszt Ferenc Street 11. | 47.190017°N 18.408333°E | Classical, cca 1820; city wall |
| 3873 | 1502 | Residential building and city wall (Lakóház és városfal) | | Országzászló Square 1. | 47.194100°N 18.409267°E | Romantic, second half of the 19th century; city wall |
| 3886 | 1547 | Residential building and city wall (Lakóház és városfal) | | Piac Square 2. | 47.189883°N 18.408100°E | Classical, cca 1810; city wall |
| 3907 | 1559 | Residential building and city wall (Lakóház és városfal) | | Táncsics Mihály Street 4. | 47.191117°N 18.411317°E | Romantic, cca 1860; city wall |
| 3898 | 1506 | Residential building and city wall; elementary school (Lakóház és városfal; általános iskola) | | Szent István Square 4. Budai Road 4. | 47.188533°N 18.413567°E | Zopfstil, cca 1790; city wall |
| 3891 | 9477 | Residential building, Medieval cemetery (Lakóház, középkori temető) | | Rózsa Street 4. | 47.192667°N 18.409617°E | The building is newly built upon the cellar that contains the cemetery of the Saint Cross Church. (Private property. Not possible to enter the cellar) |
| 3889 | 9965 | Residential building, museum (Lakóház, múzeum) | | Rác Street 19. | 47.190300°N 18.401800°E | peasant house |
| 3852 | 1524 | Residential building, Pelican Inn (Lakóház, Pelikán fogadó) | | Kossuth Street 15. | 47.189950°N 18.411583°E | Baroque, 1756. Facade in Zopfstil style, early 19th century. |
| 3812 | 1479 | Residential building, Roman Catholic parish (Lakóház, római katolikus plébánia) | | Arany János Street 9. | 47.190117°N 18.409933°E | Late Baroque, cca 1800; facade altered in 1938. |
| 3880 | 1579 | Residential building, Deák collection (Lakóház, Deák-gyűjtemény) | | Oskola Street 10. | 47.192333°N 18.408450°E | Baroque, end of 18th century; altered |
| 3897 | 1505 | Residential building, archives (Lakóház, levéltár) | | Szent István Square 3. | 47.188667°N 18.412417°E | Late Baroque, end of 18th century; facade altered several times in the 19th century; city wall |
| 3813 | 1480 | Residential building, office building (Lakóház, OMvH irodaház) | | Arany János Street 10. | 47.190033°N 18.410167°E | Zopfstil, cca 1790 |
| 3841 | 1519 | Residential building, Schaár collection (Lakóház, Schaár-gyűjtemény) | | Jókai Street 11. | 47.192450°N 18.407733°E | Romantic, cca 1870; partially museum, city gallery |
| 3836 | 1514 | Residential building, music school (Lakóház, zeneiskola) | | Jókai Street 3. Oskola Street 2–4. | 47.191517°N 18.408183°E | Baroque, 18th century |
| 3859 | 1531 | Army barracks (Laktanya) | | Malom Street 2. | 47.198200°N 18.407350°E | Late Eclectic, second half of the 19th century |
| 3821 | 1487 | Lukács House (Lukács-ház) | | Bástya Street 4. | 47.193033°N 18.409867°E | Baroque origins, Classical style, cca 1820 |
| 3831 | 1537 | Hungarian Royal Hotel; Zichy House (Magyar Király Szálló; Zichy-ház) | | Fő Street 10. | 47.195317°N 18.408883°E | Classical style, cca 1830, possibly designed by Mihály Pollack |
| 3871 | 9713 | Maria column (Mária-oszlop) | | Móri Road | 47.200333°N 18.409700°E | |
| 3885 | 1546 | Statue of Mary (Mária-szobor) | | Piac Square | 47.1895172°N 18.4067392°E | Baroque, 1700; renovated in 1839 |
| 3901 | 1509 | County Hall (Megyeháza) | | Szent István Square 9. | 47.188483°N 18.412167°E | Classical style, 1807–1812; partially designed by Mihály Pollack; city wall |
| 3866 | 1493 | County House and city wall; Local History Museum (Megyeháza és városfal; Várostörténeti múzeum) | | Megyeház Street 17. | 47.189550°N 18.410133°E | Medieval details, Baroque, cca 1730; partially altered and expanded in the second half of the 19th century and in the 20th century; city wall |
| 3869 | 1541 | Statue of John of Nepomuk (Nepomuki Szent János-szobor) | | Móri Road | 47.200733°N 18.409217°E | Baroque, 1705 |
| 3927 | 1494 | Cast iron bandstand (Öntöttvas zenecsarnok) | | Zichy Grove | 47.196867°N 18.408500°E | Eclectic style, 1879. Designed by Antal Platzer, made in Antal Oetl's iron foundry |
| | 11702 | Ősfehérvár Restaurant (Ősfehérvár Vendéglő) | | Táncsics Mihály Street 1. | 47.191533°N 18.410750°E | |
| 3918 | 1556 | Episcopal palace (Püspöki palota) | | Városház Square 5. | 47.191717°N 18.409733°E | Zopfstil, 1790–1801; possibly built by Jakab Riedel. |
| 3906 | 1558 | Reformed church (Református templom) | | Széchenyi Road | 47.184900°N 18.414867°E | Late Classical, 1844 |
| 3807 | 1475 | Roman Catholic Hentel Chapel (Római katolikus Hentel-kápolna) | | Arany János Street | 47.190667°N 18.409733°E | Gothic, cca 1470 |
| 3806 | 1474 | Roman Catholic church, episcopal cathedral (Római katolikus templom, püspöki székesegyház) | | Arany János Street | 47.190417°N 18.409833°E | Gothic origins; the current Baroque style church was built between 1759–1778, designed by Martin Grabner. |
| 3913 | 1554 | Roman Catholic church, former Franciscan church (Római katolikus templom, volt ferences templom) | | Városház Square | 47.191167°N 18.409233°E | Baroque, 1720–1742 |
| 3829 | 1536 | Roman Catholic church, former Jesuit, Paulite and Cistercian church (Római katolikus templom, volt jezsuita, pálos, majd cisztercita templom) | | Fő Street 6. János Passage 2. | 47.192629°N 18.408776°E | Baroque, 1745–1755 |
| 3883 | 1544 | Roman Catholic church, former carmelite and seminary church (Római katolikus templom, volt karmelita, majd szemináriumi templom) | | Petőfi Street – Kossuth Street corner | 47.189483°N 18.411633°E | Baroque, 1745–1748 |
| 3842 | 1551 | Open-air museum of ruins (Romkert) | | Koronázó Square; Várkörút 5. | 47.191967°N 18.411583°E | |
| 3924 | 1570 | Say House (Say-ház) | | Vörösmarty Square 8. | 47.186983°N 18.413483°E | Early Romantic, cca 1860. Possibly designed by Miklós Ybl. |
| 3822 | 1564 | Splényi House (Splényi-ház) | | Budai Street 22. | 47.189767°N 18.417050°E | Classical style, cca 1830. |
| 3894 | 9732 | Statue of St. Stephen (Szent István-szobor) | | Szent István Square | 47.188667°N 18.412200°E | By Ferenc Sidló, 1938 |
| 3870 | 1560 | Holy Trinity statue (Szentháromság-szobor) | | Móri Road; Havranek József Street | 47.200350°N 18.409417°E | Romantic, cca 1840. By Antal Havranek Senior. |
| 3882 | 1543 | Tombs of the Serbian cemetery (Szerb temető sírkövei) | | Palotai Road | 47.196550°N 18.398117°E | 18-19th century |
| 3855 | 1527 | Szőgyény-Marich House and city wall (Szőgyény-Marich ház és városfal) | | Liszt Ferenc Street 1. | 47.190700°N 18.408700°E | Baroque, 18th century; House of Culture, shops; city wall |
| 3911 | 1580 | City wall remains (Várfalak) | | Várkörút; Bástya Street 3. Jókai Street 2. Piac Swuare; Ady Endre Street 9–11. | 47.189483°N 18.409183°E | city wall remains in several places in the city center |
| 3909 | 9731 | Varkocs Statue (Varkocs-szobor) | | Fő Street | 47.194067°N 18.409067°E | From 1938, sculpted by Dezső Erdey. |
| 3915 | 1552 | City Hall (Városháza) | | Városház Square 1. | 47.191217°N 18.409600°E | From the 17th century, Baroque, 1712–1718; currently Late Barque style, 1790 |
| 3892 | 9825 | Water mill and beer brewery (Városi vízimalom és serfőző) | | Sörház Square 1. | 47.201167°N 18.402917°E | Baroque, 1800 |
| 3799 | 1731 | Barrage (Völgyzáró gát) | | at the Pátkai Dam | 47.249400°N 18.489200°E | From Roman times, 3rd or 4th century. |
| 11159 | 11004 | Mihály Vörösmarty County Library and István Csók Gallery (Vörösmarty Mihály Megyei Könyvtár és Csók István Képtár) | | Bartók Béla Square 1. | 47.192883°N 18.407833°E | |
| 3919 | 1565 | Statue of Mihály Vörösmarty (Vörösmarty Mihály szobra) | | Vörösmarty Square | 47.186933°N 18.413317°E | 1865, by Miklós Vay |
| 3912 | 9712 | Statue of Ferenc Wathay (Wathay Ferenc emlékműve) | | Prohászka Grove | 47.192300°N 18.411450°E | Made in between the two world wars, sculptor: Elek Lux; city wall; |
| 3928 | 1495 | Wertheim House (Wertheim-ház) | | Zichy Grove 1. | 47.195800°N 18.408550°E | Late Classical, cca 1840 |
| 3896 | 1504 | Nunnery and city wall; city archives (Zárda és városfal; levéltár) | | Szent István Square 2. | 47.188950°N 18.412317°E | Originally Baroque, 18th century; currently Classical style, 1831; city wall |
| 3843 | 1520 | Zichy Mansion (Zichy-palota) | | Kossuth Street 1. Városház Square 1. | 47.191183°N 18.410300°E | Zopfstil, 1781; expanded in 1936–1937 |

== Notes ==
- As given in source, Kálmáncsehi; but also occurs written as ′Kálmáncsehy′ in other sources.
- The same building is listed with two different registry numbers in the source database.

== Sources ==
- "Székesfehérvár műemlékeinek listája" (in Hungarian). Műemlékem.hu.
