= Mihajlo Živković =

Serbian painter (1776 – after 1825)

Mihajlo Živković (1776 in Buda, Habsburg monarchy – after 1825 in Buda, Austrian Empire) was a Serbian academic painter who lived and worked during the late Baroque and rococo period. He painted in the European neoclassical style.

In 1798, Mihajlo Živković graduated from the Academy of Fine Arts in Vienna. Upon returning home, he opened an atelier in downtown Buda. After painting patron saint icons for wealthy Serbian families in Buda and the surrounding area in 1802, he began work on a large-scale iconostasis of the Church of the Annunciation in Szentendre which he completed two years later (1804). At the centre of the iconostasis are the Royal Doors, upon which are icons of Christ and the Virgin, both painted in a conventional manner, according to the client's requests. The figures of the Twelve apostles in medallions to the left and right of the large composition of the Coronation of the Virgin show that Živković broke away from customary form. The apostles are shown in lively movements and spontaneous positions, a departure from the typical stiff standing figures of the time. In the smaller compositions of the Source of Life and Christ and the Woman from Samaria, located in the lower part of the iconostasis, Živković demonstrated a natural devotion to the colouring of rococo painters. After completing iconostasis, he went back to painting portraits before another commission to paint a large iconostasis in the Serbian Orthodox church of Balassagyarmat came along in 1815.

The Serbian church in Balassagyarmat is now a museum where his icons are on display. Živković's iconostases in Szentendre and Balassagyarmat have survived to this day as "exceptional monuments from the transition period of centuries and styles".

Živković's work is also on display at the National Museum in Belgrade.

== See also ==
- List of Serbian painters
