= Eparchy of Buda =

Diocese of the Serbian Orthodox Church

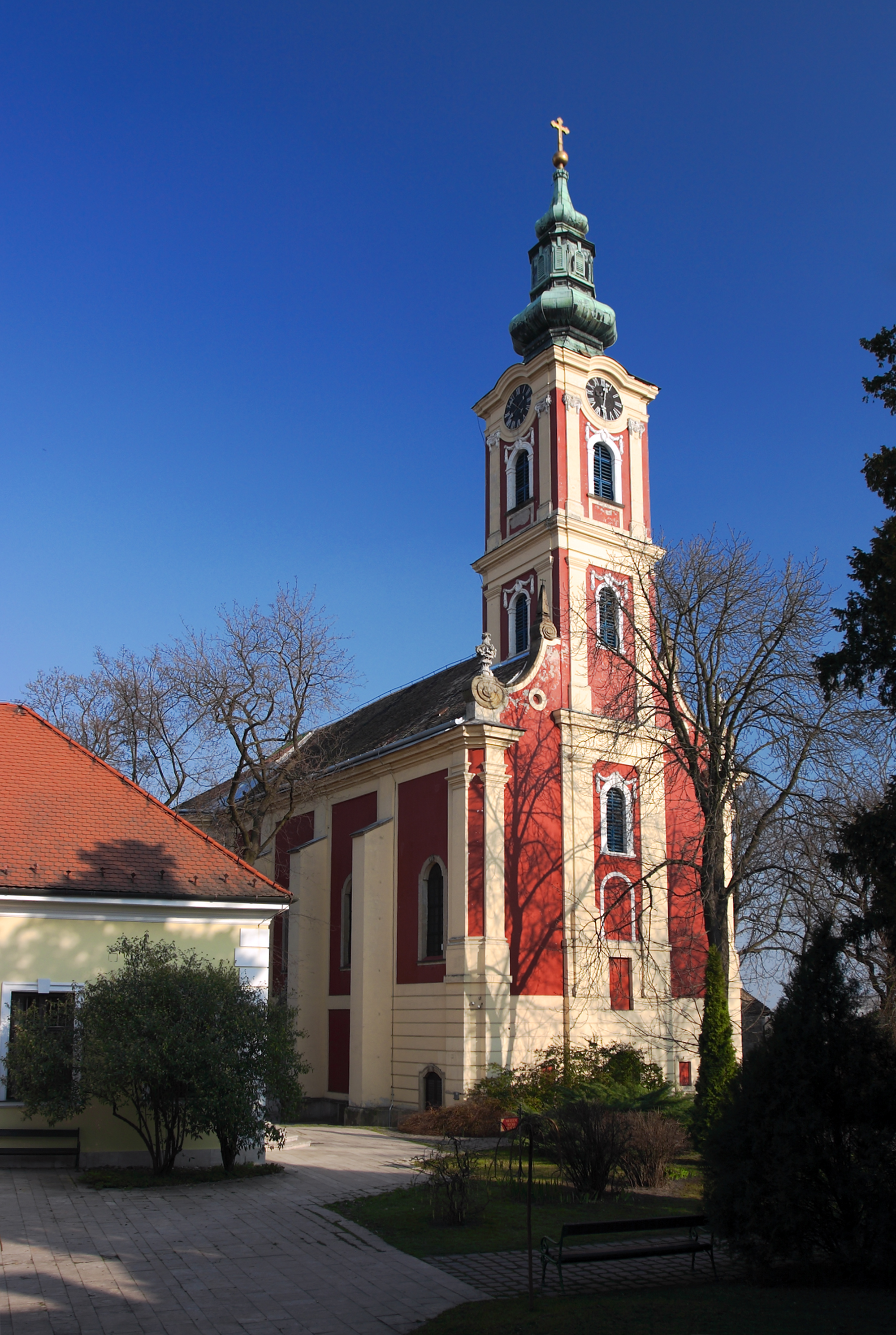
- Cathedral of the Dormition of the Theotokos, Szentendre

Location
- Territory: Hungary
- Headquarters: Szentendre

Information
- Denomination: Eastern Orthodox
- Sui iuris church: Serbian Orthodox Church
- Established: 17th century
- Cathedral: Cathedral of the Dormition of the Theotokos, Szentendre
- Language: Church Slavonic, Serbian

Current leadership
- Bishop: Lukijan Pantelić

Website
- Eparchy of Buda

The Eparchy of Buda (Serbian: Епархија будимска, romanized: Eparhija budimska) is a diocese (eparchy) of the Serbian Orthodox Church, covering Hungary and having jurisdiction specifically over ethnic Serbs in that territory.

== History ==
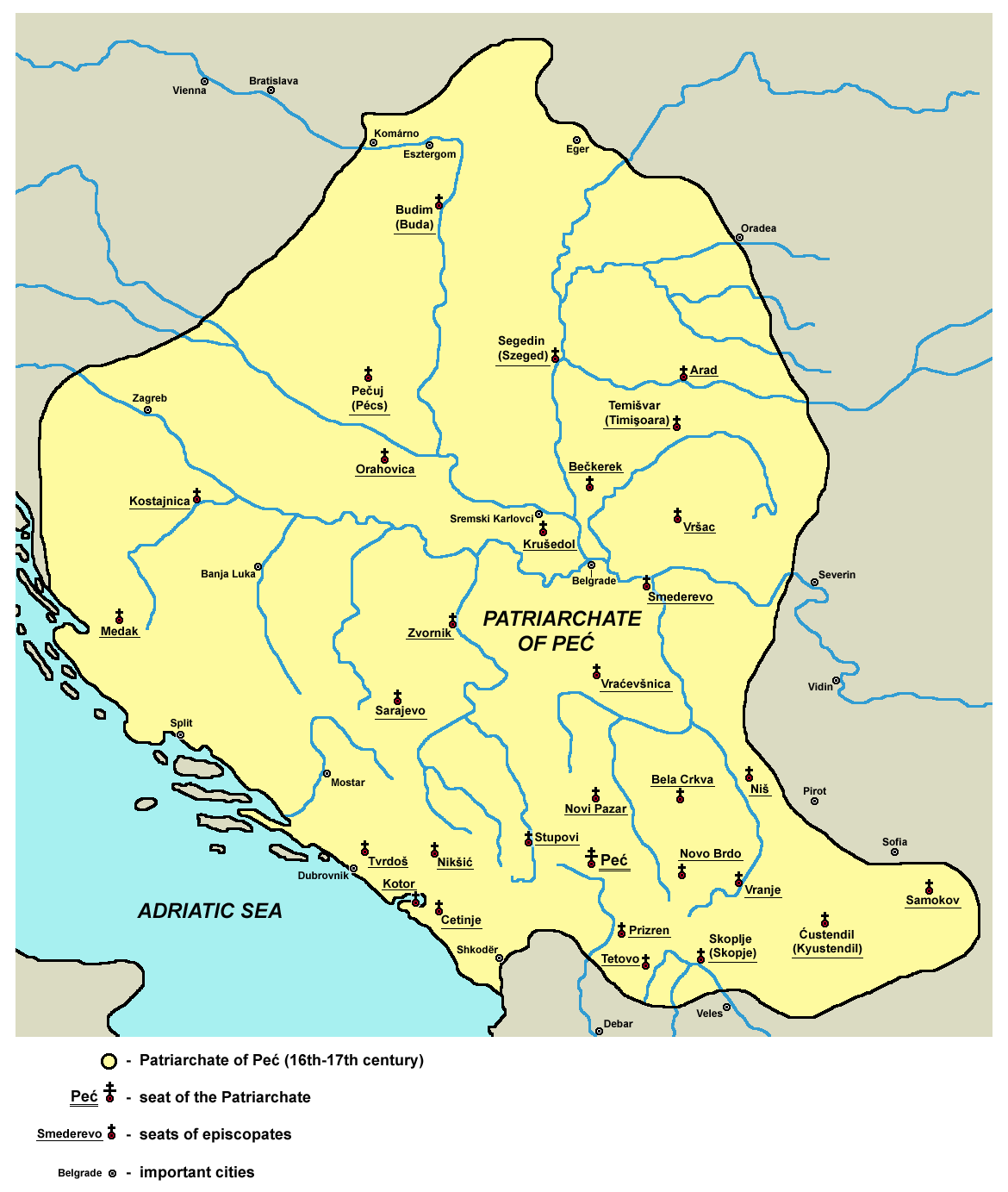
Jurisdiction of Serbian Patriarchate of Peć in the 16th and 17th centuries

During the Middle Ages, authorities of the Kingdom of Hungary had an ambivalent attitude towards the presence of Eastern Orthodox Christians in various regions of the realm, that was depending mainly on current relations with the Byzantine Empire, and medieval Serbia. By the end of the 15th century, Serb presence in southern regions of the realm was gradually increased by continuous migrations that were caused by Ottoman invasion of Serbian lands.

In the 16th century, following the Ottoman conquest of Hungary, the Eparchy of Buda was established, under the jurisdiction of the Serbian Patriarchate of Peć. By the end of the 17th century, those regions of were liberated from the Ottoman rule and incorporated into the Habsburg monarchy. Since 1708, the eparchy belonged to the Serbian Orthodox Metropolitanate of Krušedol (Karlovci) that became the Patriarchate of Karlovci in 1848. After 1918, the eparchy continued to function within political frames of the new Hungarian state, belonging in terms of ecclesiastical jurisdiction to the unified Serbian Orthodox Church.

== Structure ==
The Eparchy of Buda comprises 11 parishes with active clergy: Budapest, Szeged, Pécs, Szentendre, Lórév, Deszk, Mohács, Hercegszántó, Százhalombatta, Battonya, and Pomáz. The priests of these parishes administer the other parishes in Hungary. The episcopal see is located at the Cathedral of the Dormition of the Theotokos, Szentendre. Its headquarters and bishop's residence are also in Szentendre.

The diocese operates 34 churches and two monasteries, among others:

- Church of Saint George (Budapest)
- Church of Saint Nicholas (Szeged)
- Church of Saint Nicholas (Eger)
- Church of the Transfer of the Relics of the Holy Father Nicholas (Baja)
- Church of the Transfer of the Relics of the Holy Father Nicholas (Dunaújváros)
- Church of Saint John the Baptist (Székesfehérvár)
- Church of the Saint Michael the Archangel (Szentendre)
- Annunciation Church (Szentendre)
- Transfiguration Church (Szentendre)
- Church of Saint George (Magyarcsanád)
- Church of Saint Petka (Majs)
- Church of Saint George (Pomáz)
- Church of Saint George (Somberek)
- Serbian Kovin Monastery (Ráckeve)
- Church of Saint Nicholas (Győr, Hungary)

== List of bishops ==
- Sava
- Sevastijan I
- Sevastijan II
- Simeon
- Viktor (1660–1668)
- Kiril (1668–1680)
- Viktor (1680–1684)
- Evtimije Popović (1695–1700)
- Vikentije Popović-Hadžilavić (1708–1713)
- Mihailo Milošević (1716–1728)
- Vasilije Dimitrijević (1728–1748)
- Dionisije Novaković (1749–1767)
- Arsenije Radivojevic (1770–1774)
- Sofronije Kirilović (1774–1781)
- Stefan Stratimirović (1786–1790)
- Dionysios Papazoglou (1791–1828)
- Stefan Stanković (1829–1834)
- Justin Jovanović (1834)
- Pantelejmon Živković (1836–1839)
- Platon Atanacković (1839–1851)
- Arsenije Stojković (1852–1892)
- Lukijan Bogdanović (1897–1908)
- Georgije Zubković (1913–1951)
- Hrizostom Vojinović (1951–1952)
- German Đorić (1952–1956)
- Arsenije Bradvarević (1960–1963)
- various administrators (1963–1988)
- Danilo Krstić (1988–2002)
- Lukijan Pantelić (2002–present)

== Gallery ==
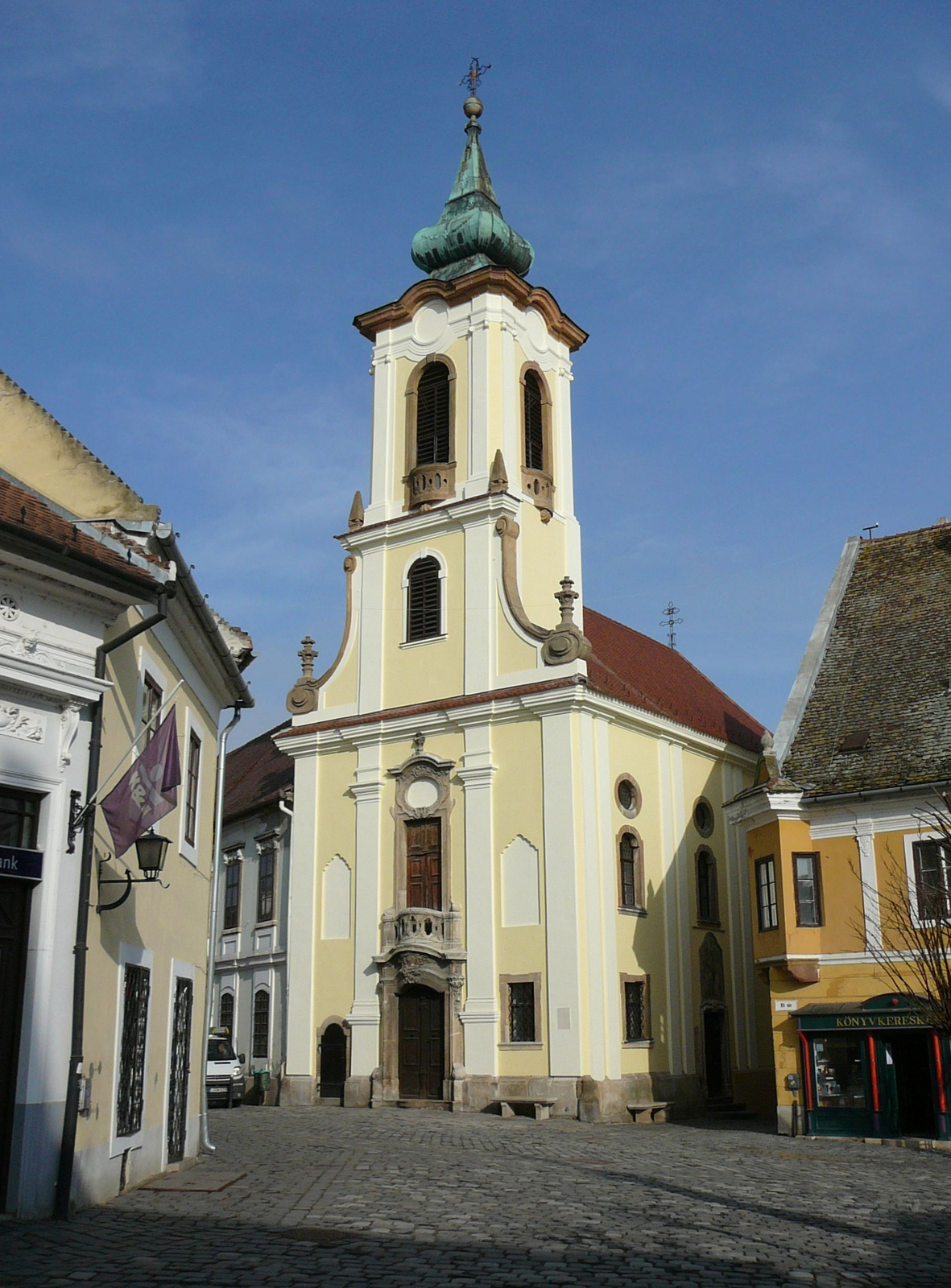
Annunciation Church (Szentendre)

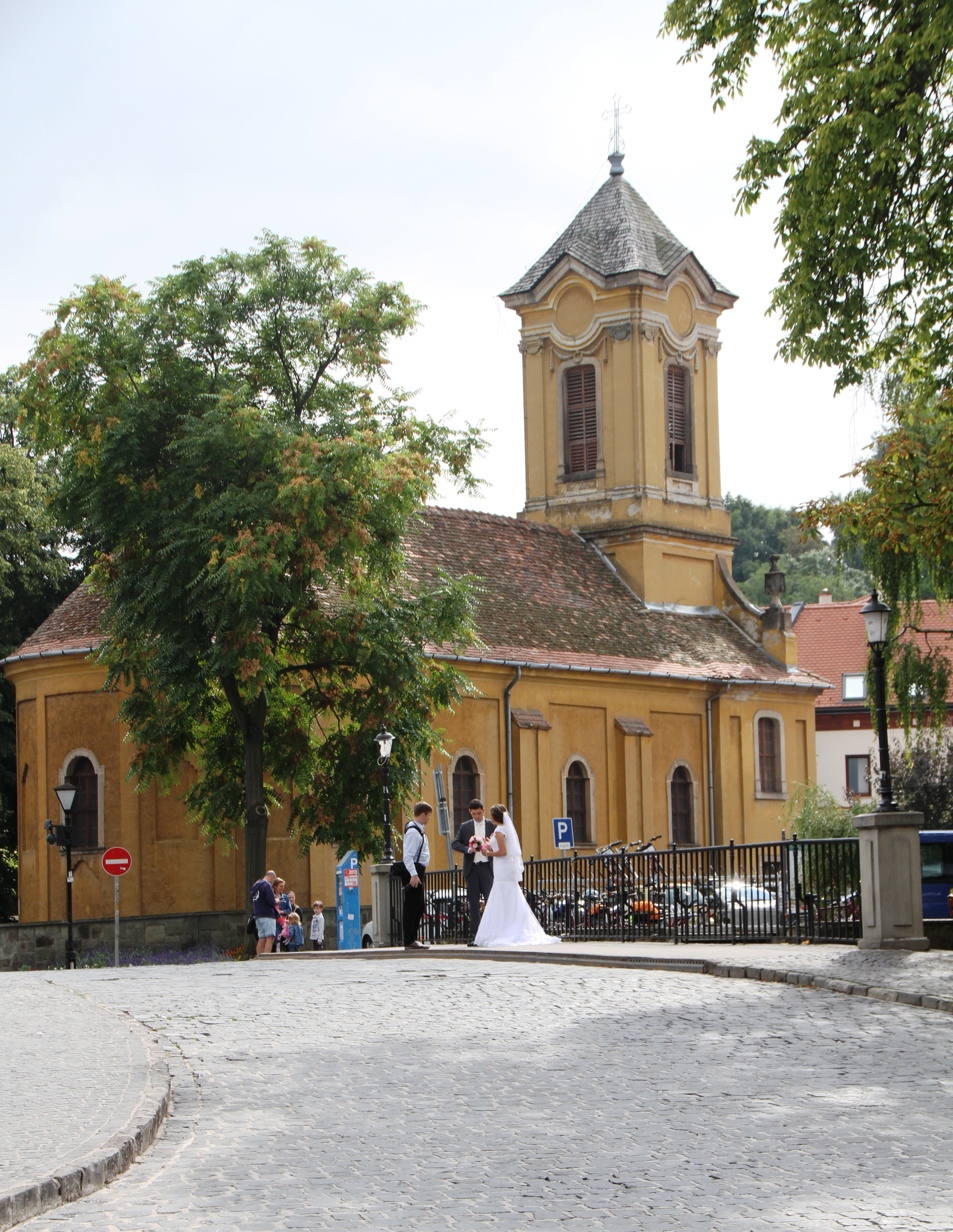
Church of Saint Michael the Archangel (Szentendre)

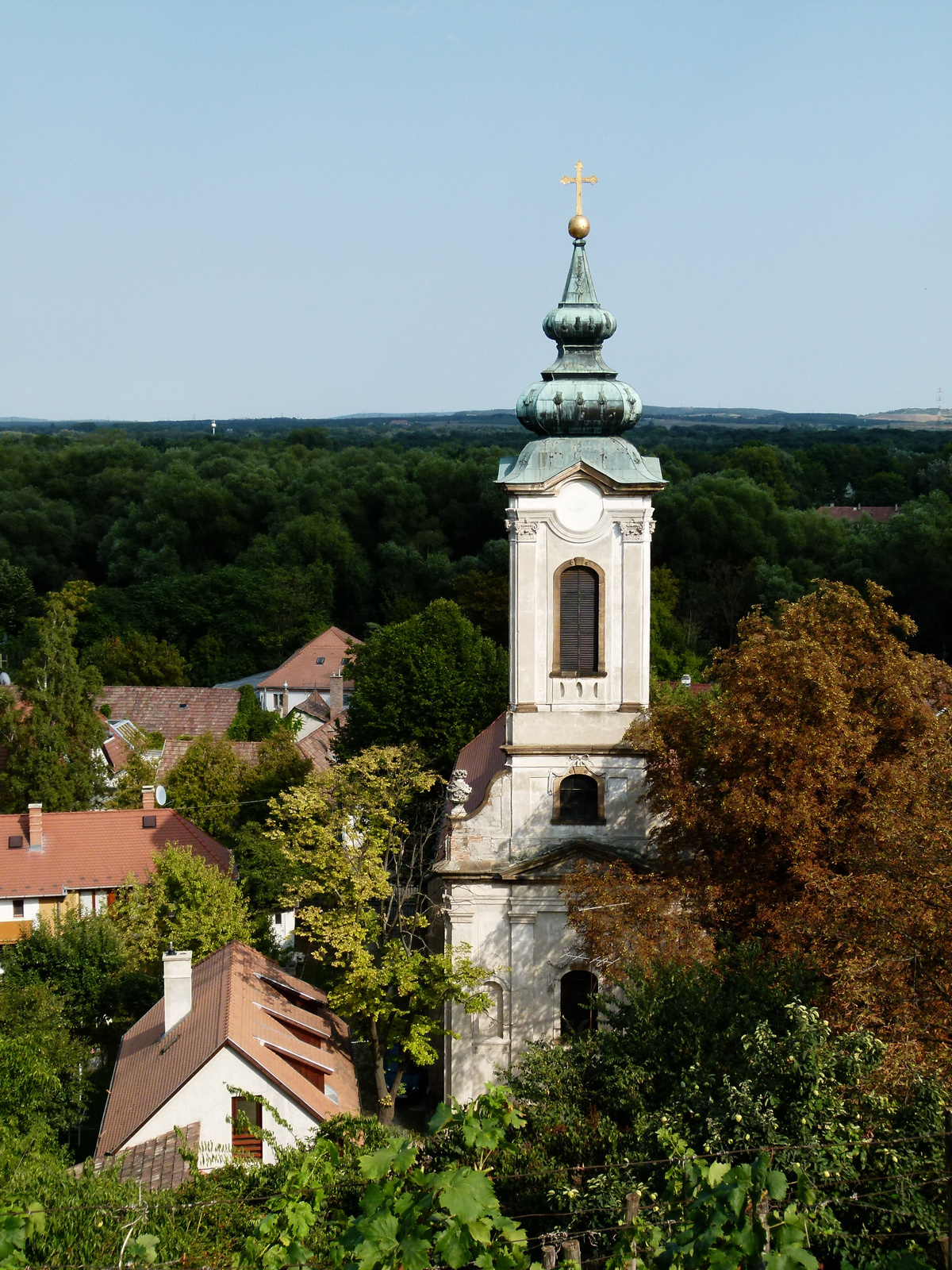
Transfiguration Church (Szentendre)

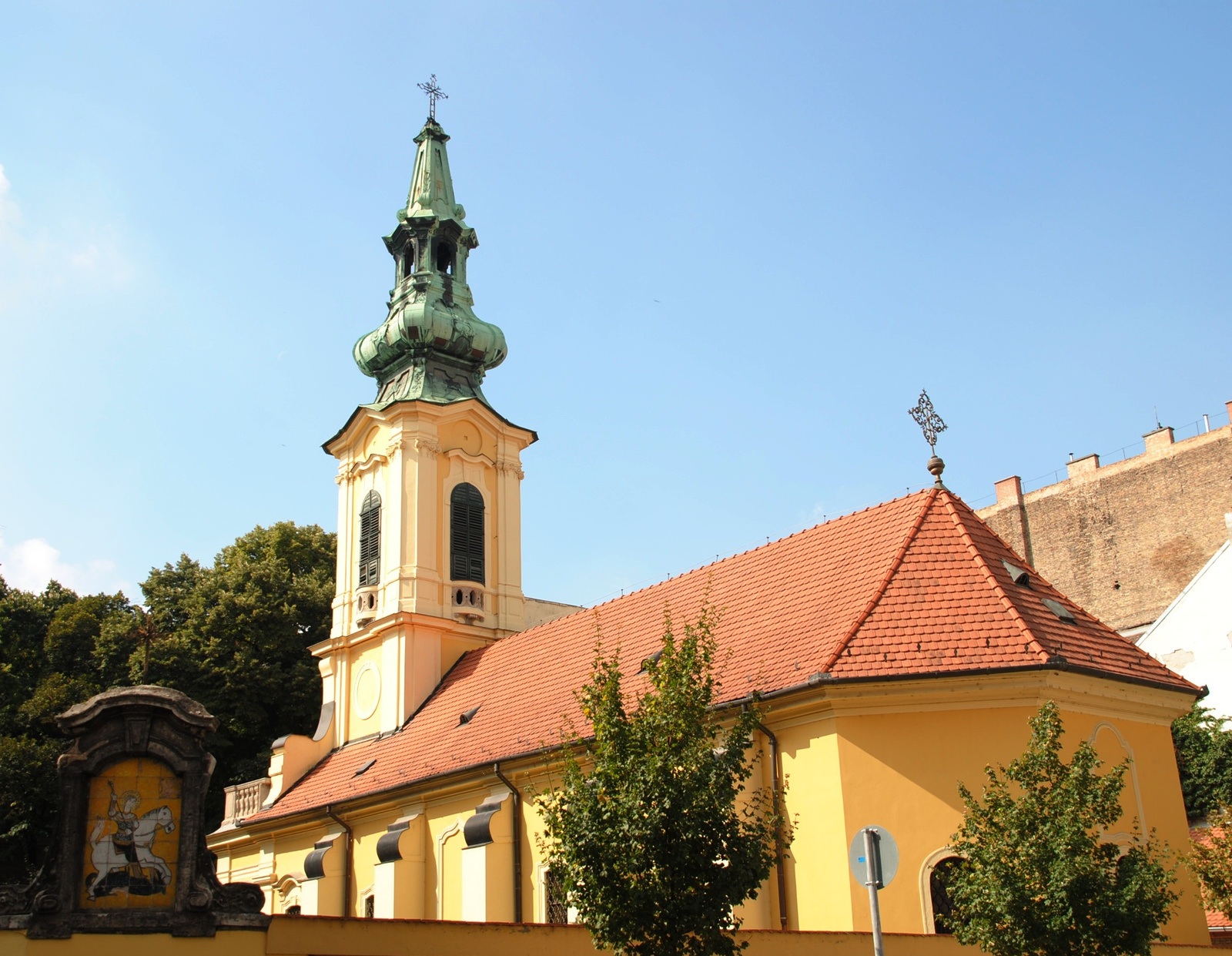
Church of Saint George (Budapest)

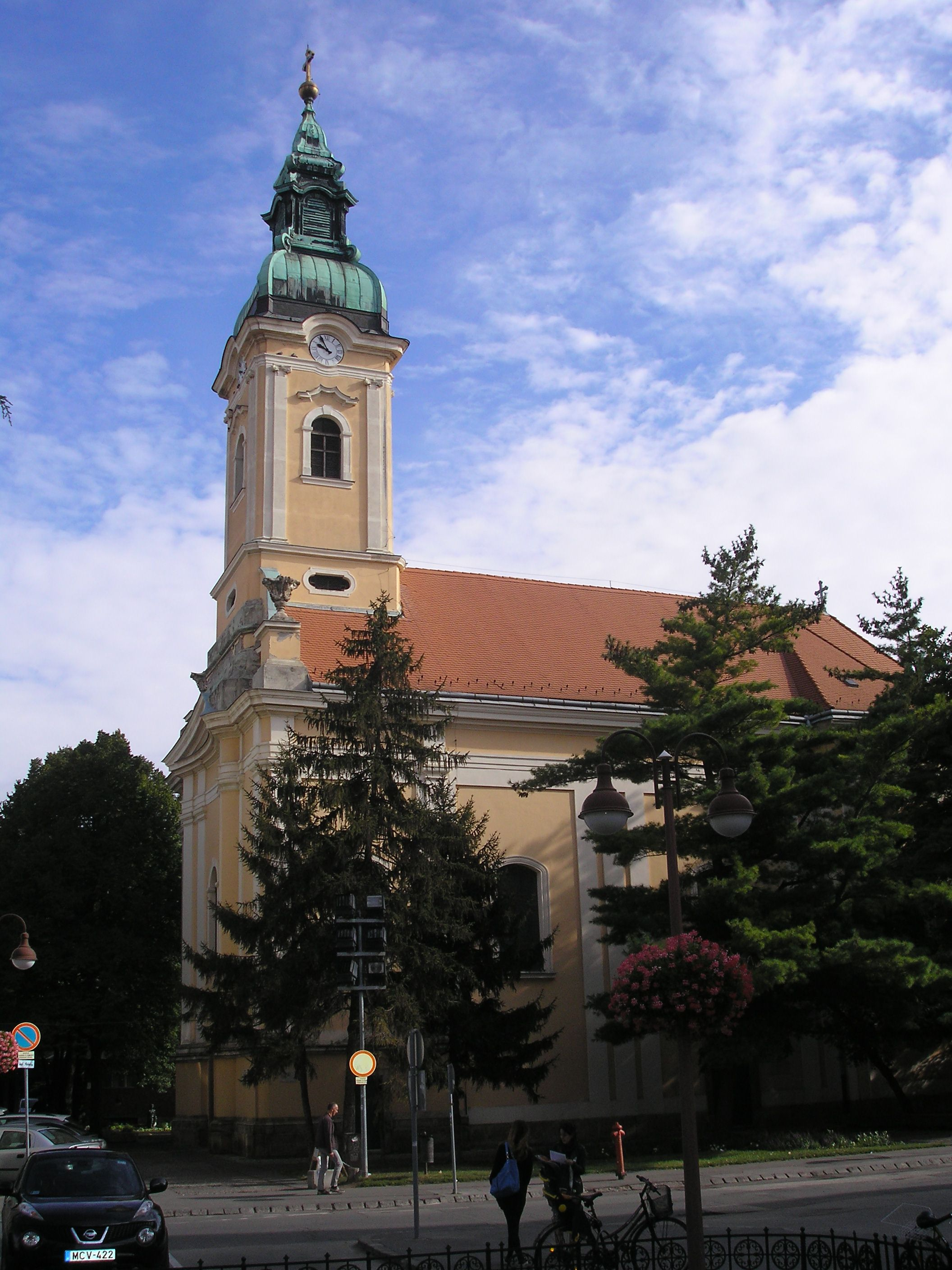
Church of Saint Nicholas (Szeged)

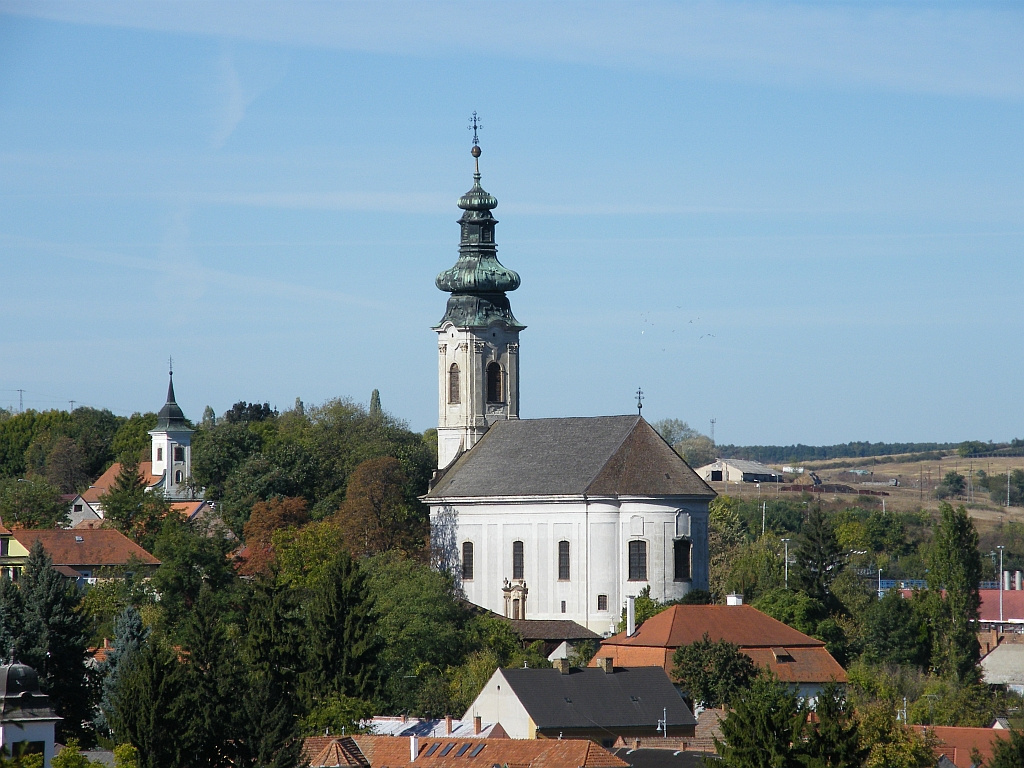
Church of Saint Nicholas (Eger)

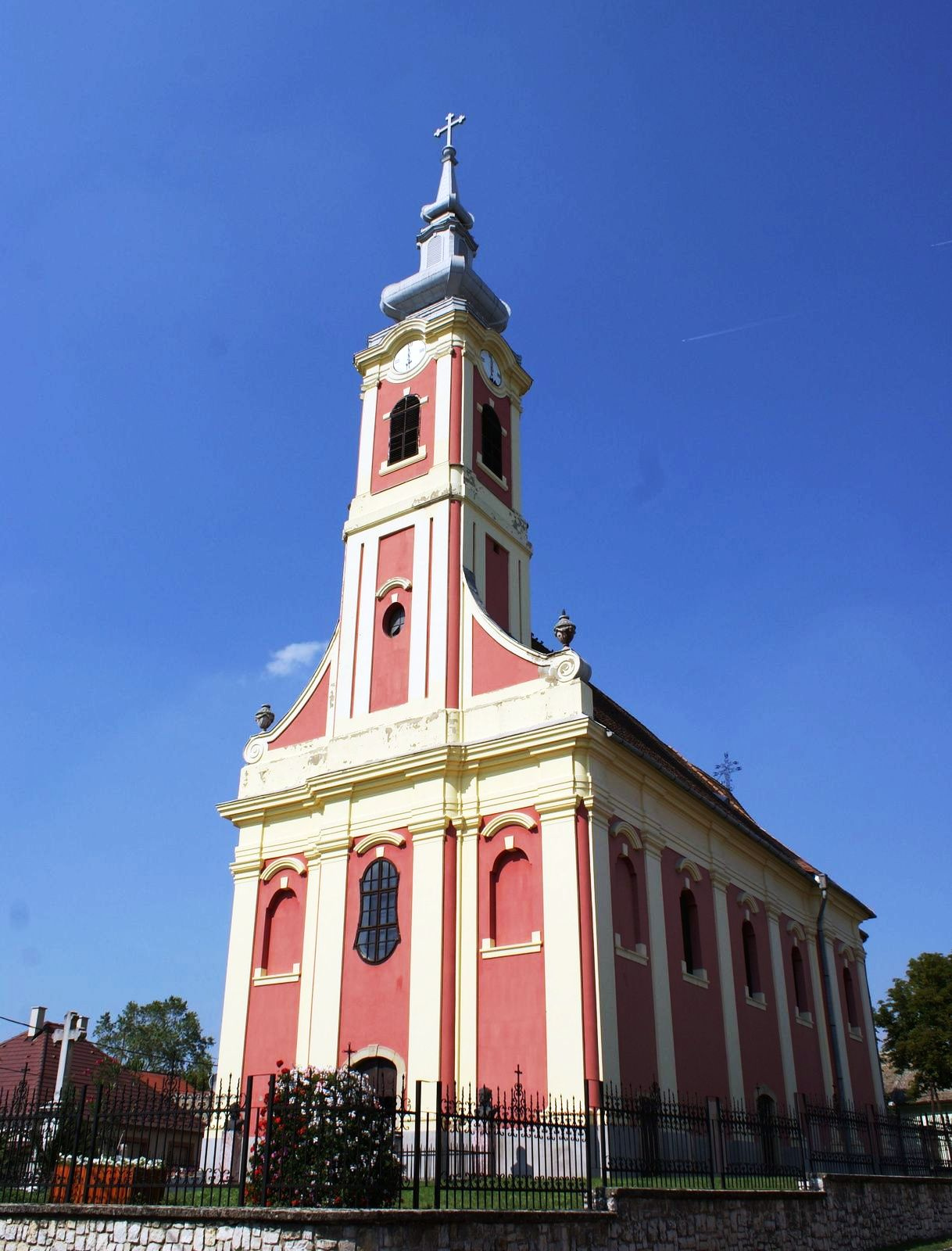
Church of the Transfer of the Relics of the Holy Father Nicholas (Baja)

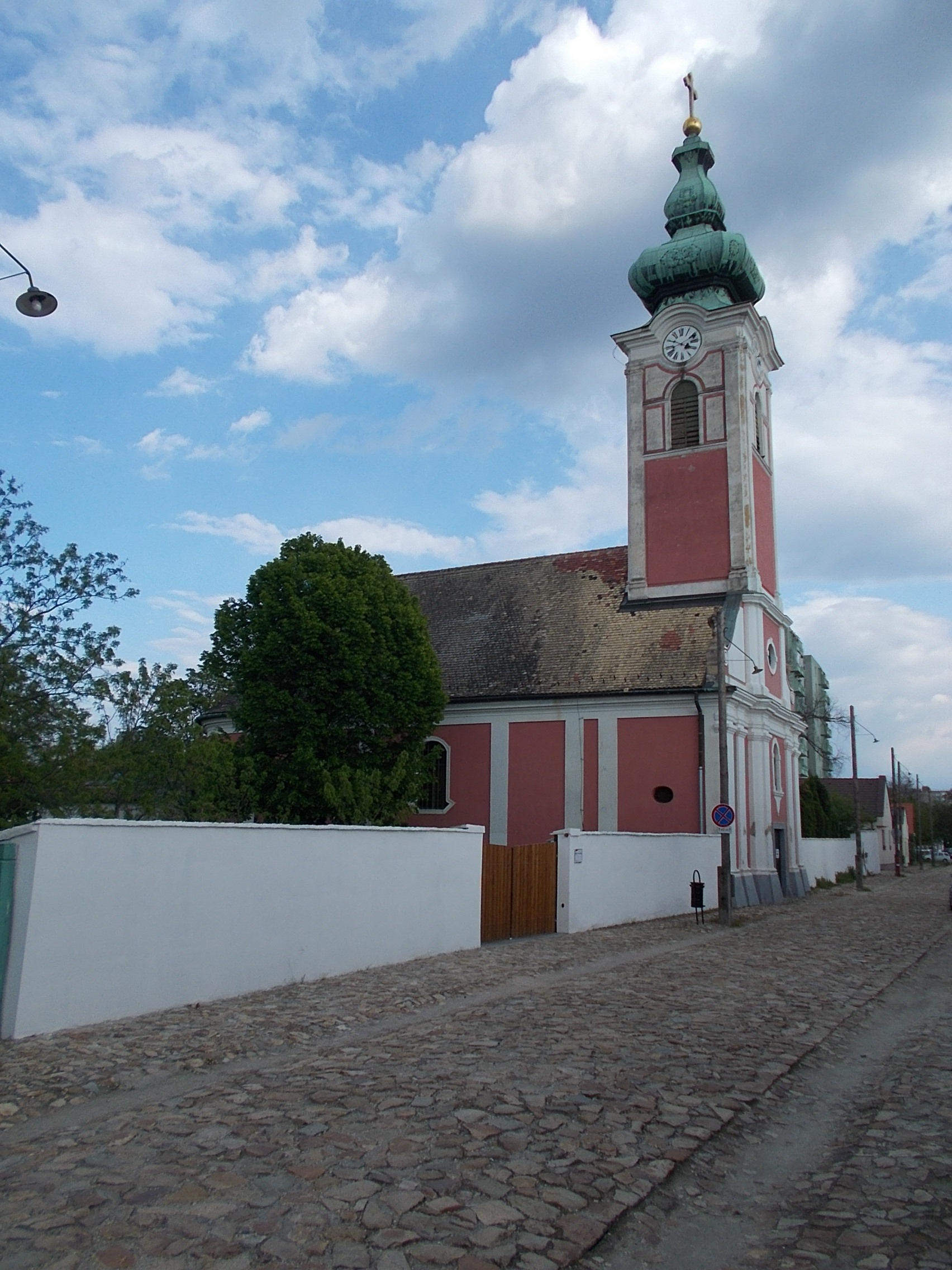
Church of Saint John the Baptist (Székesfehérvár)

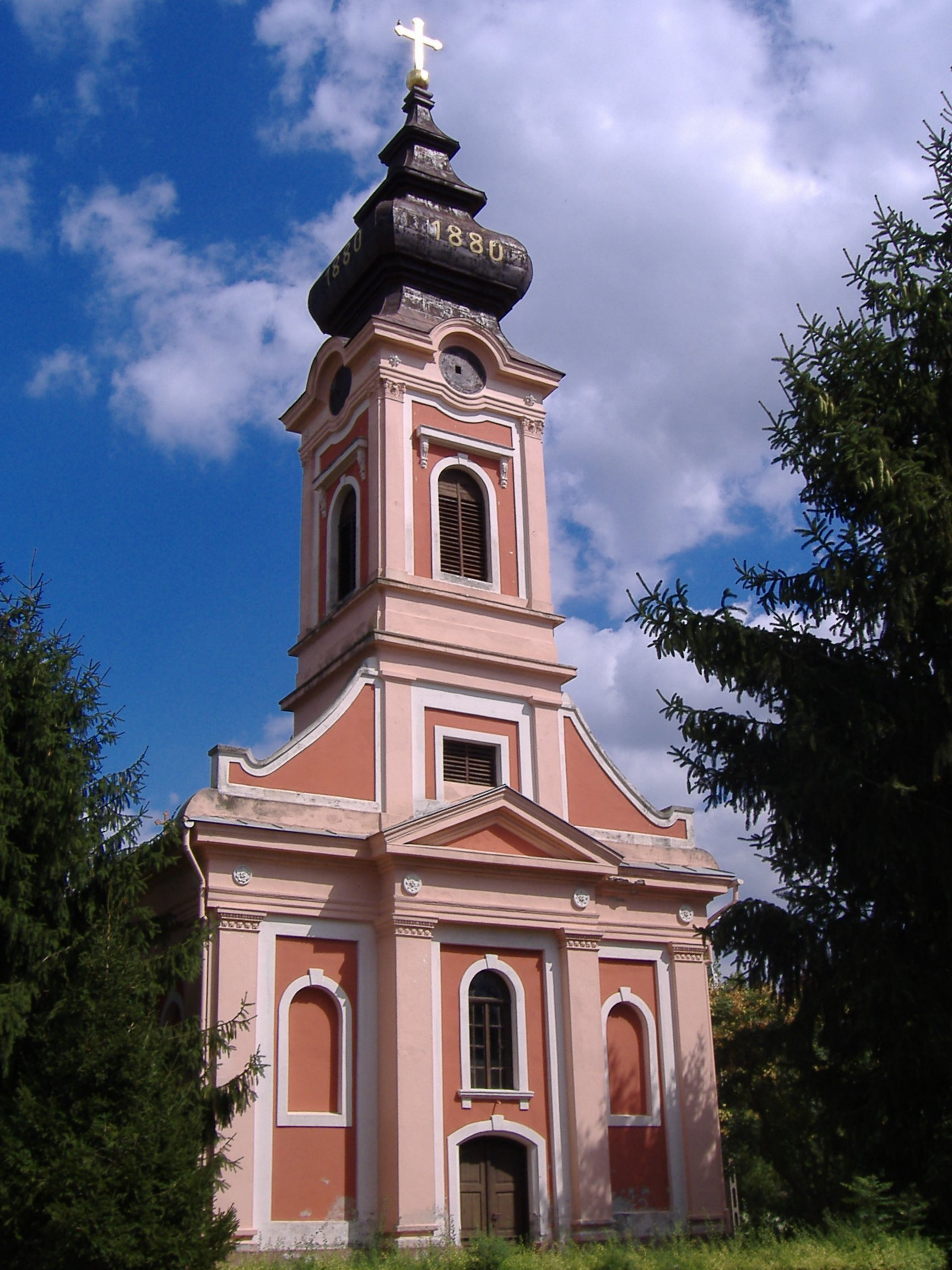
Church of Saint George (Magyarcsanád)

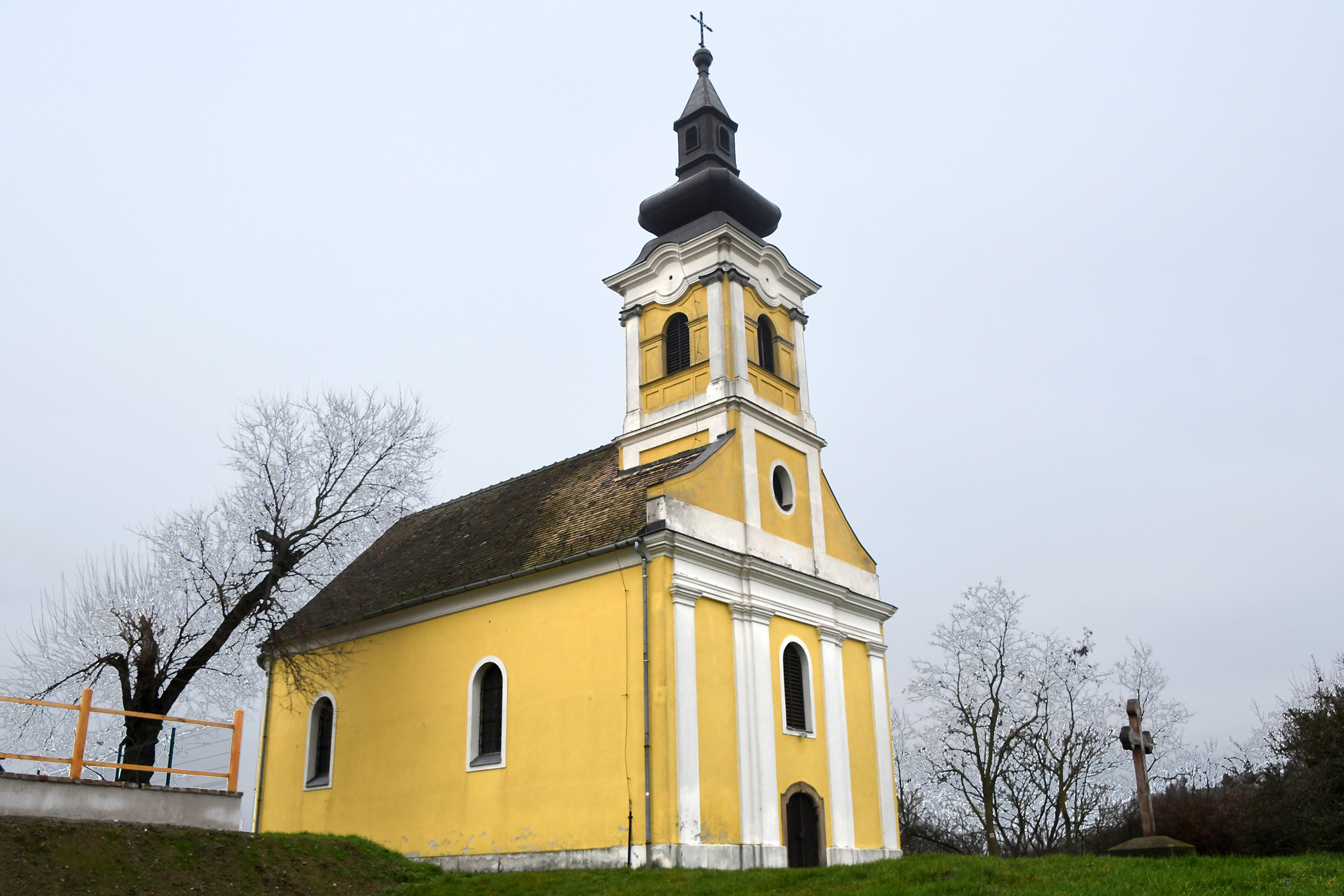
Church of the Transfer of the Relics of the Holy Father Nicholas (Dunaújváros)

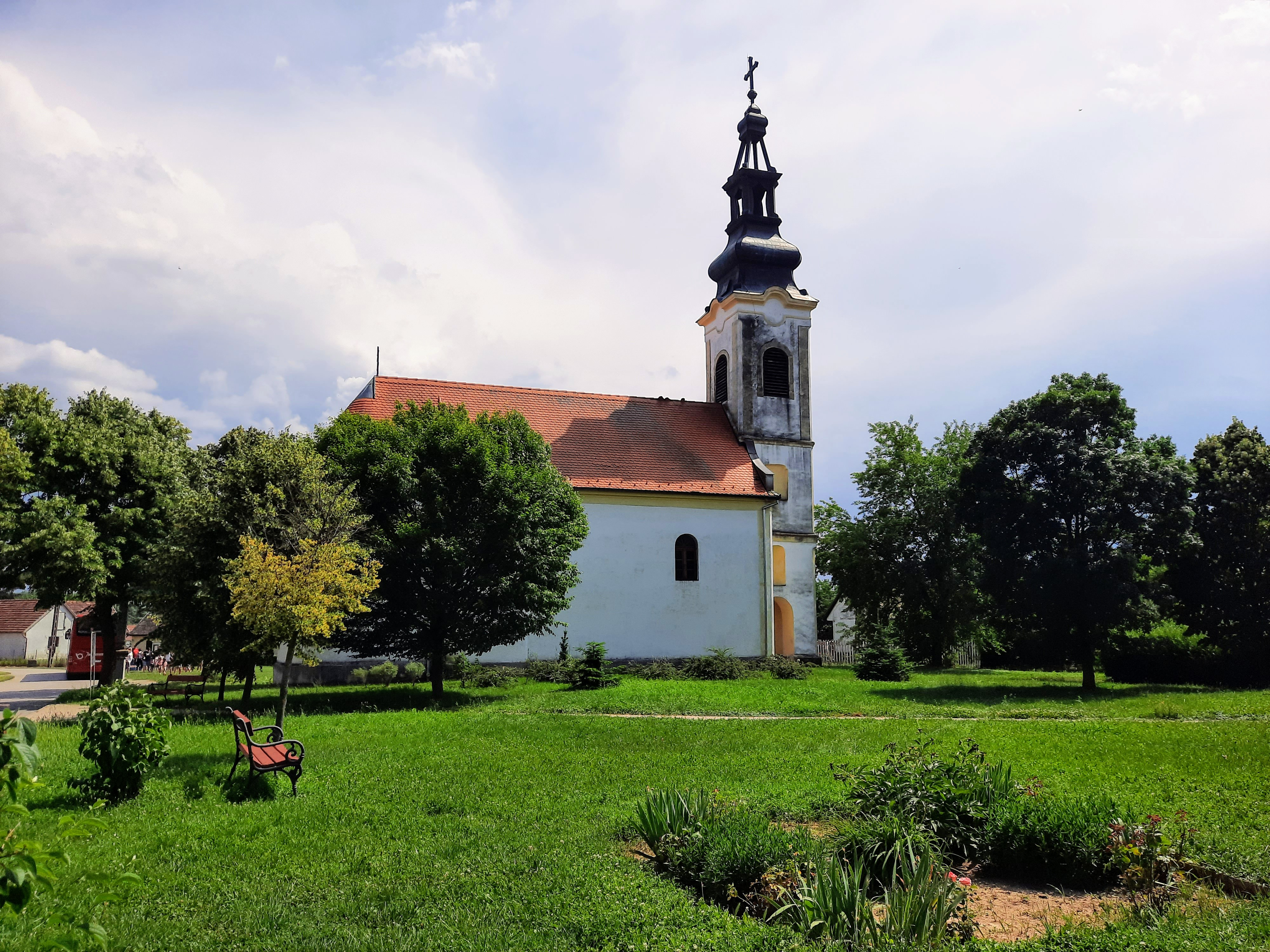
Church of Saint Petka (Majs)

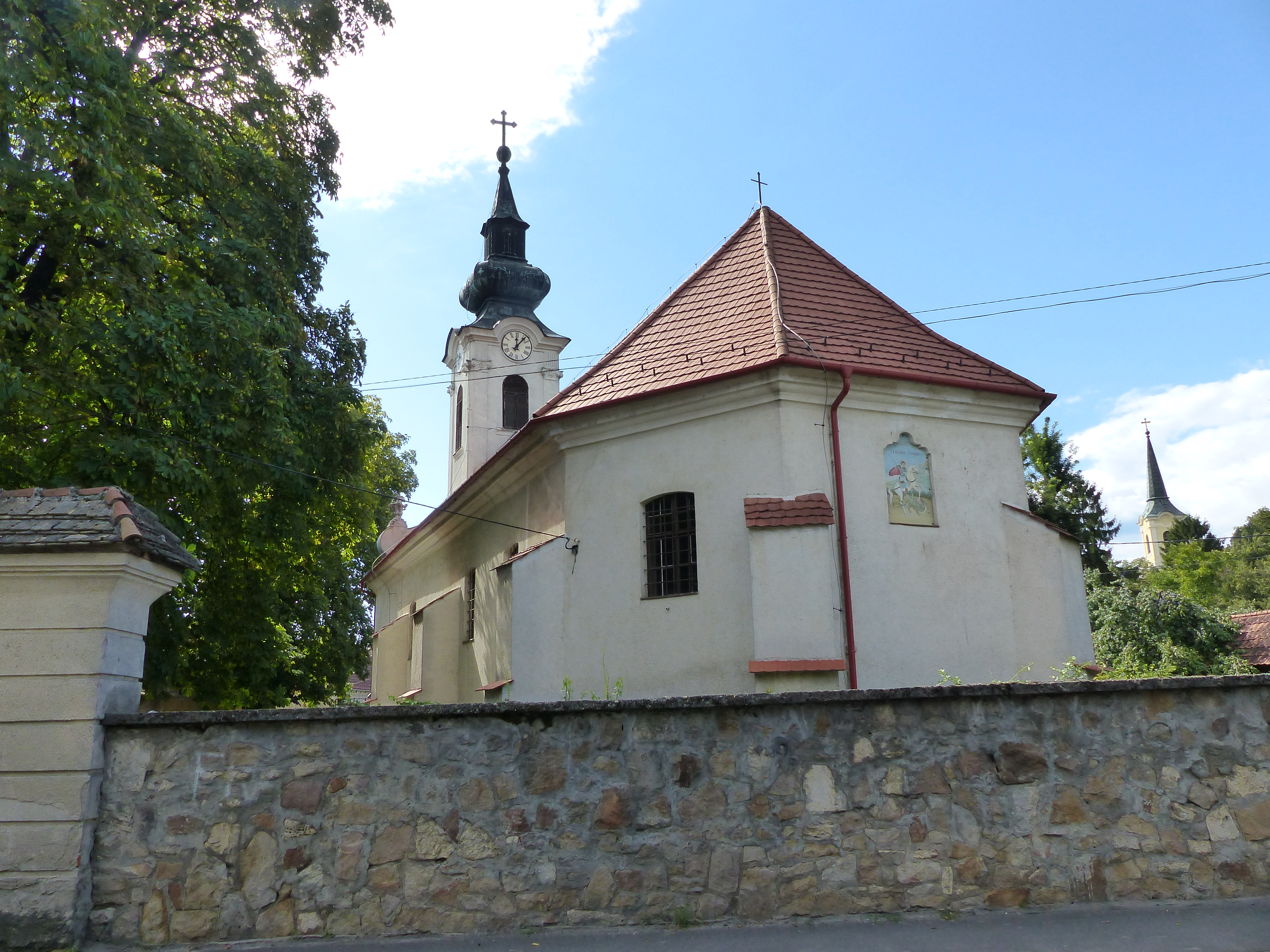
Church of Saint George (Pomáz)

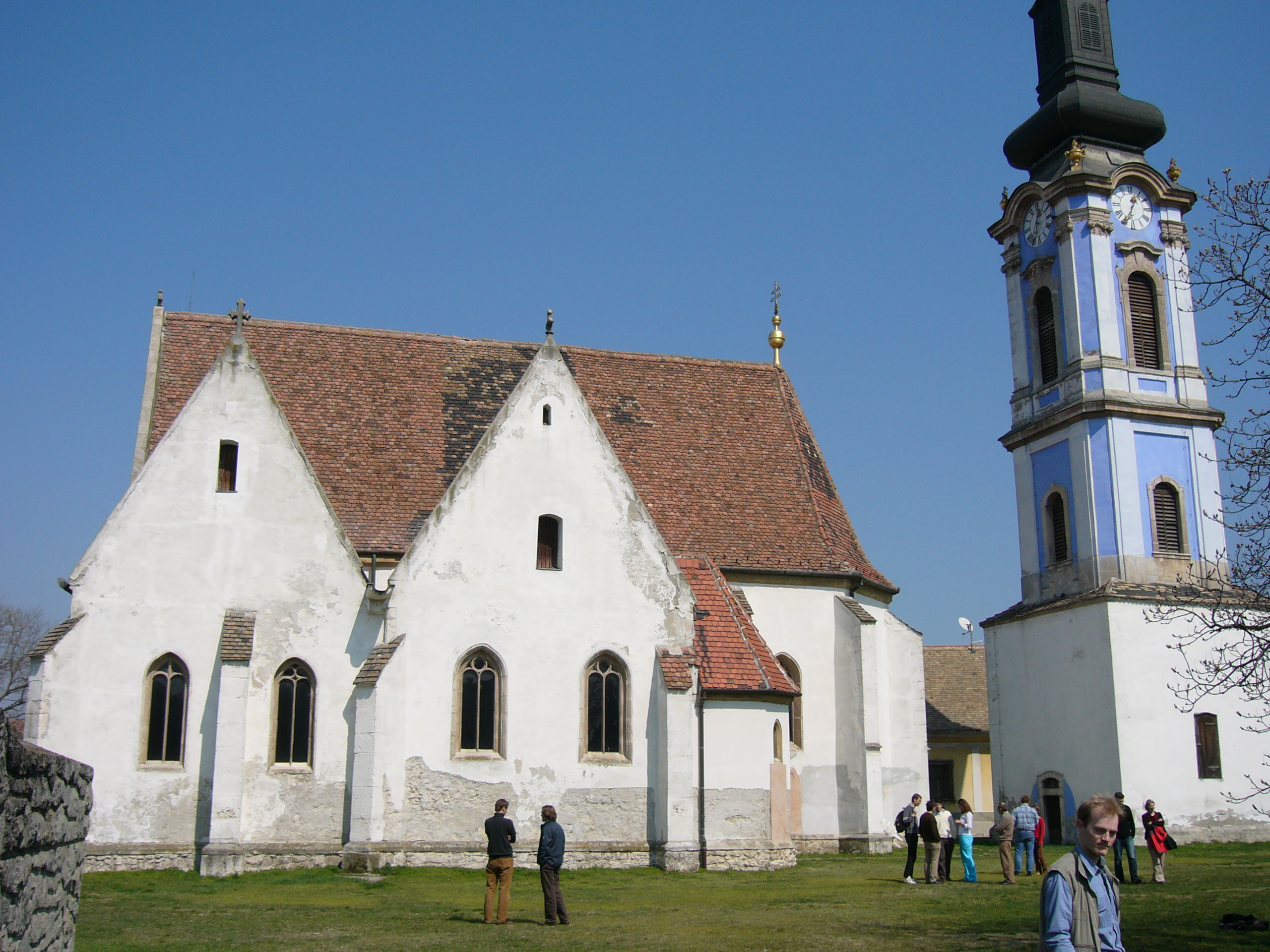
Serbian Kovin Monastery (Ráckeve)

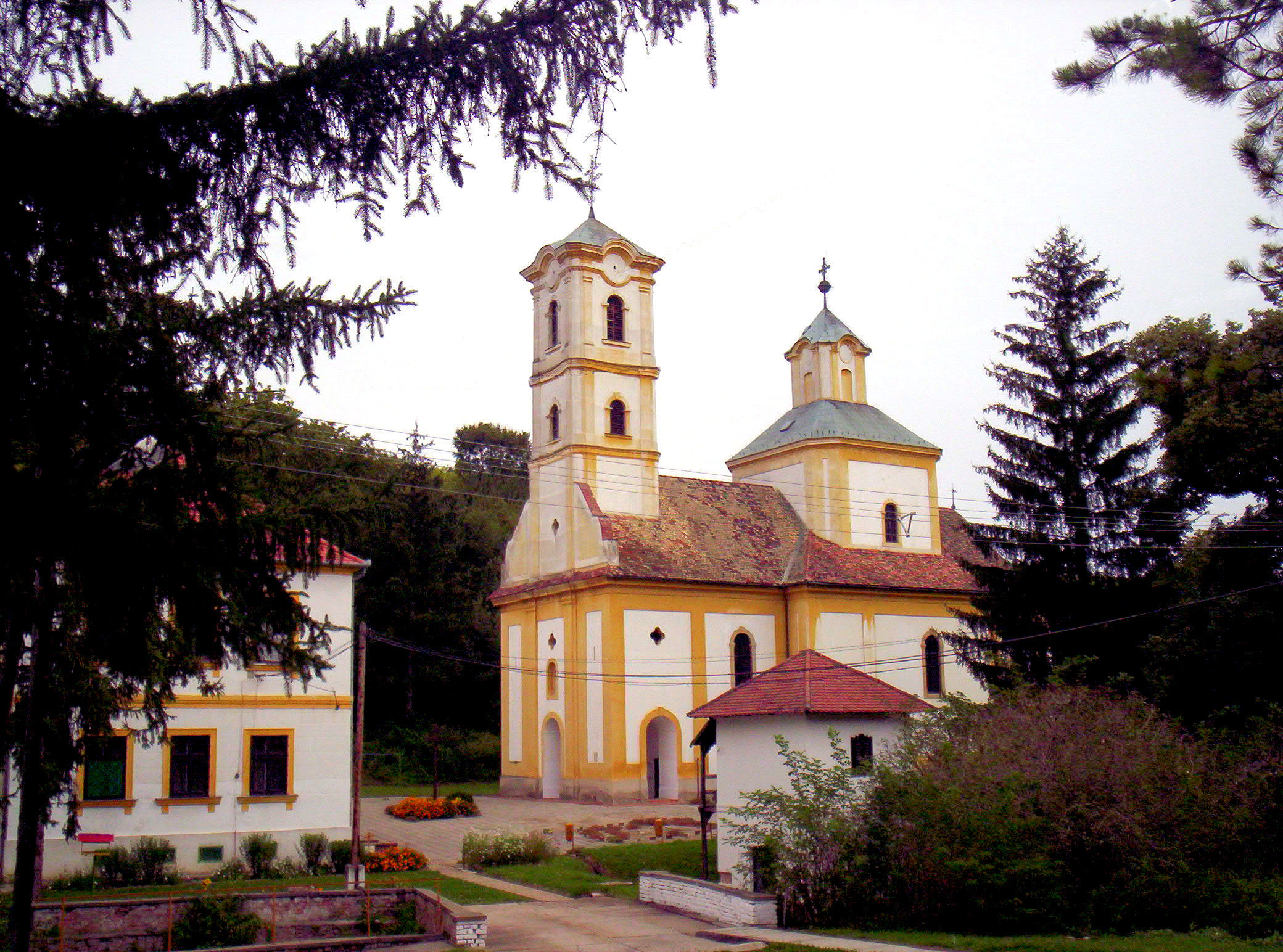
Grabovac Monastery (Grábóc)

== See also ==
- Eastern Orthodoxy in Hungary
- Eparchies and metropolitanates of the Serbian Orthodox Church
- Serbs of Hungary
- Archives of the Eparchy of Buda

== Sources ==
- Baán, István (1999). "The Metropolitanate of Tourkia: The Organization of the Byzantine Church in Hungary in the Middle Ages". Byzanz und Ostmitteleuropa 950-1453. Wiesbaden: Harrassowitz Verlag. pp. 45–53. ISBN 978-3-447-04146-1.
- Bataković, Dušan T., ed. (2005). Histoire du peuple serbe [History of the Serbian People] (in French). Lausanne: L’Age d’Homme. ISBN 978-2-8251-1958-7.
- Ćirković, Sima (2004). The Serbs. Malden: Blackwell Publishing. ISBN 9781405142915.
- Gavrilović, Slavko (1993). "Serbs in Hungary, Slavonia and Croatia in struggles against the Turks (15th–18th centuries)". Serbs in European Civilization. Belgrade: Nova, Serbian Academy of Sciences and Arts, Institute for Balkan Studies. pp. 41–54. ISBN 978-86-7583-015-3.
- Isailović, Neven G.; Krstić, Aleksandar R. (2015). "Serbian Language and Cyrillic Script as a Means of Diplomatic Literacy in South Eastern Europe in 15th and 16th Centuries" (PDF). Literacy Experiences concerning Medieval and Early Modern Transylvania. George Bariţiu Institute of History. pp. 185–195. Archived from the original (PDF) on 2024-06-07.
- Kašić, Dušan, ed. (1966). Serbian Orthodox Church: Its past and present. Vol. 2. Belgrade: Serbian Orthodox Church.
- Martin, Joannes Baptista; Petit, Ludovicus, eds. (1907). "Serborum in Hungaria degentium synodi et constitutiones ecclesiasticae". Sacrorum conciliorum nova et amplissima collectio. Vol. 39. Parisiis: Huberti Welter, Bibliopolae. pp. 497–956.
- Sotirović, Vladislav B. (2011). "The Serbian Patriarchate of Peć in the Ottoman Empire: The First Phase (1557–94)" (PDF). Serbian Studies. 25 (2): 143–169. doi:10.1353/ser.2011.0038. Archived from the original (PDF) on 2016-08-10.
- Točanac-Radović, Isidora (2018). "Belgrade - Seat of the Archbishopric and Metropolitanate (1718–1739)". Belgrade 1521-1867. Belgrade: The Institute of History. pp. 155–167. ISBN 978-86-7743-132-7.
- Todorović, Jelena (2006). An Orthodox Festival Book in the Habsburg Empire: Zaharija Orfelin's Festive Greeting to Mojsej Putnik (1757). Aldershot: Ashgate Publishing. ISBN 978-0-7546-5611-1.
