= Church of Saint Petka, Majs =

Serbian Orthodox church in Majs, Hungary

Church of Saint Petka
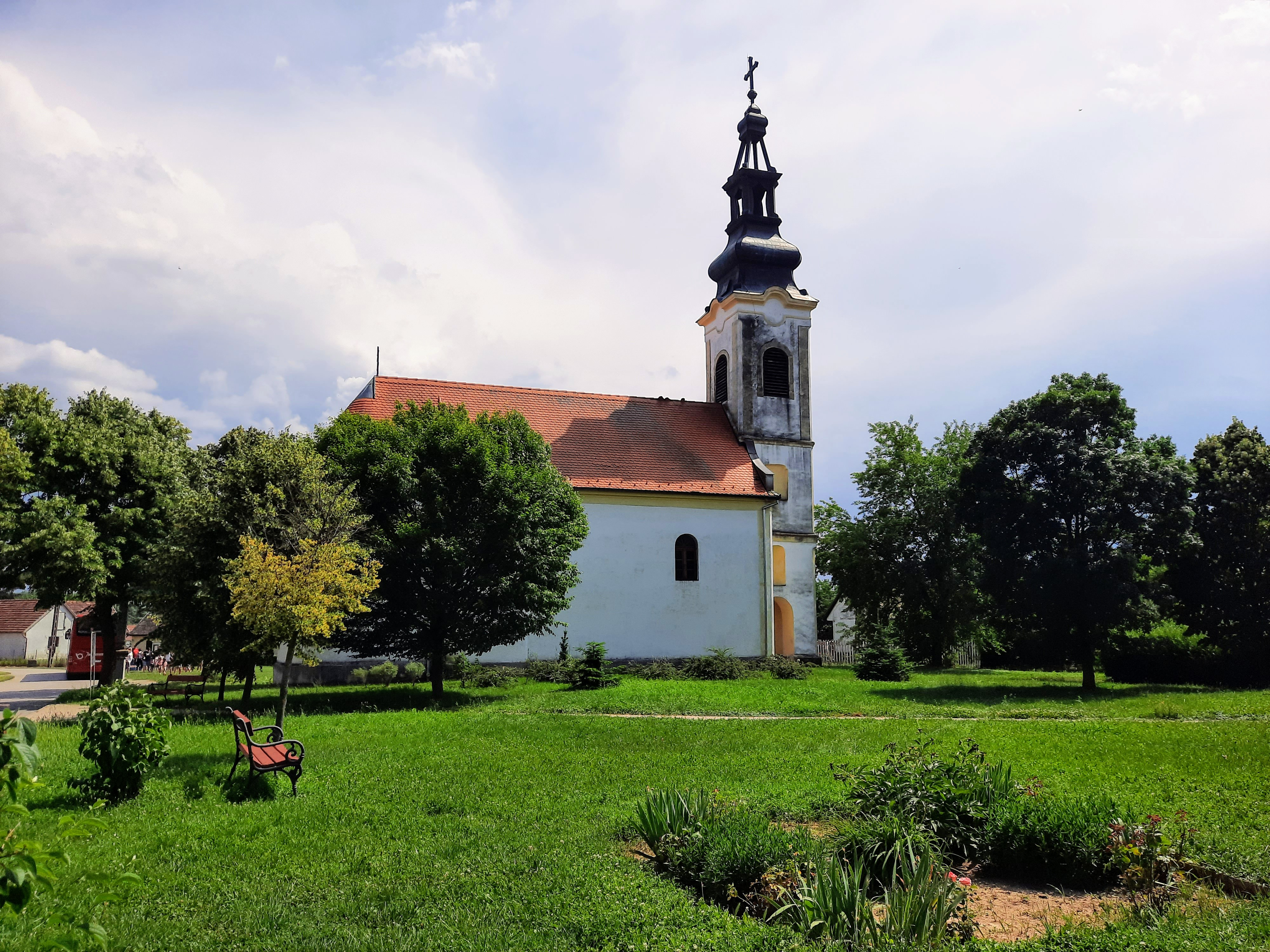
- Church of Saint Petka
- Church of Saint Petka
- 45°54′22″N 18°35′55″E
- Location: Majs, Mohács District, Baranya County
- Country: Hungary
- Denomination: Serbian Orthodox Church

History
- Status: Church
- Dedication: Saint Petka

Architecture
- Functional status: Active
- Style: Neo-classicism
- Years built: 1781

Administration
- Archdiocese: Eparchy of Buda

The Church of Saint Petka (Serbian: Црква свете Петке, romanized: Crkva svete Petke; Hungarian: Szent Petka templom)) is an Eastern Orthodox church located in Majs, Hungary. It is under jurisdiction of the Eparchy of Buda of the Serbian Orthodox Church.

It was rebuilt in 1781 and is the second Serbian Orthodox church established in the village.

It is built in a typical style of provincial Baroque. A distinctive feature of the church is the decorative metal finial on its tower, which includes two levels of ornamentation: the lower level is designed as a pseudo-lantern, while the upper level tapers conically in four steps, culminating in a base topped with an orb and a cross.

The current iconostasis, created in 1806, was painted by Jakov Nedić, a provincial iconographer, and his son Stojan. Nedić, a resident of the village of Bobota, is known for his work on iconostases in Batasek, Borjad, and Majš. The church underwent restoration in 1896.

Since 1984, it has been under historical monument protection.

== See also ==
- Eparchy of Buda
- Serbs of Hungary
