= Church of Saint George, Magyarcsanád =

Serbian Orthodox church in Magyarcsanád, Hungary

Church of Saint George
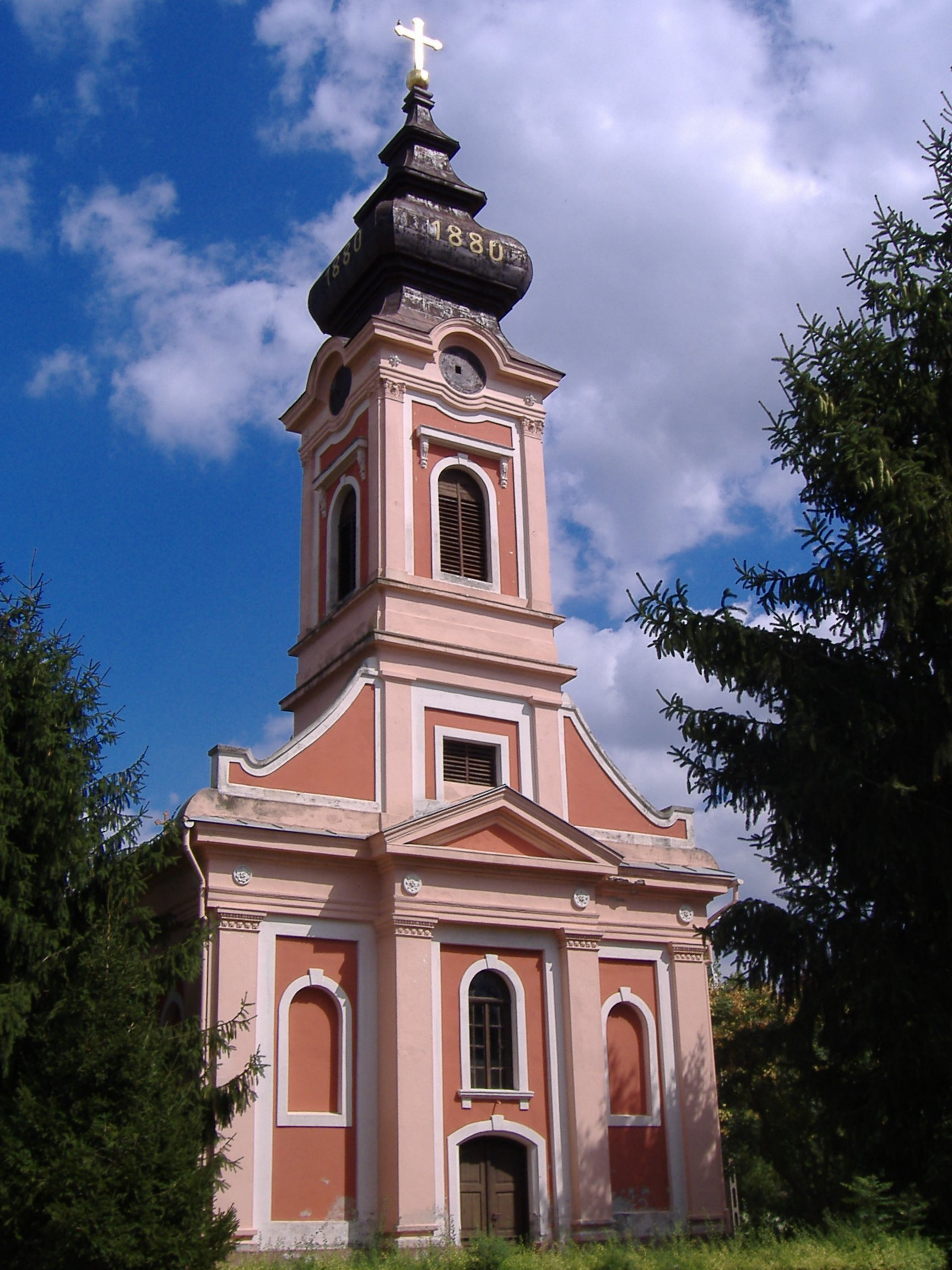
- Church of Saint George
- Church of Saint George
- 46°10′12″N 20°36′42″E
- Location: Magyarcsanád, Csongrád-Csanád County
- Country: Hungary
- Denomination: Serbian Orthodox Church

History
- Status: Church
- Dedication: Saint George

Architecture
- Functional status: Active
- Style: Neo-classicism
- Years built: 1875

Administration
- Archdiocese: Eparchy of Buda

The Church of Saint George (Serbian: Црква Светог Георгија, romanized: Crkva Svetog Georgija; Hungarian: Szent György templom) is an Eastern Orthodox church located in Magyarcsanád, Hungary. It is under jurisdiction of the Eparchy of Buda of the Serbian Orthodox Church.

The church was completed in 1880 as a smaller replica of the neighbouring Romanian Orthodox church that up until that time served both orthodox communities.

== History ==
The church in Magyarcsanád was originally shared by the local Romanian and Serbian Orthodox communities. Built in 1808, it served both communities until 1878, when they separated. Following a court decision, the church was assigned to the Romanian community, while the Serbs received 12,500 forints in compensation. The Serb community used this sum, along with local donations, to fund the construction of their own church. The church was designed by Mihajlov Janik, an architect from Arad, and was modelled after the neighbouring church, which remained under Romanian control. However, the new building was smaller in size. The iconostasis and frescoes, created by Gyoka Putnik and Gyoka Joca, were completed in 1898.

Two memorial plaques adorn the church's walls: one commemorates Serbs who died in World War I, and the other marks the 290th anniversary of the Serb community’s settlement in the area. A wreath is placed on the entrance door in honour of St. John. During World War II, in October 1944, the roof and tower were destroyed by fire. The church underwent its most recent renovation in 1996–97.

== See also ==
- Eparchy of Buda
- Serbs of Hungary
