= Church of the Transfer of the Relics of the Holy Father Nicholas, Baja =

Serbian Orthodox church in Baja, Hungary

Church of the Transfer of the Relics of the Holy Father Nicholas
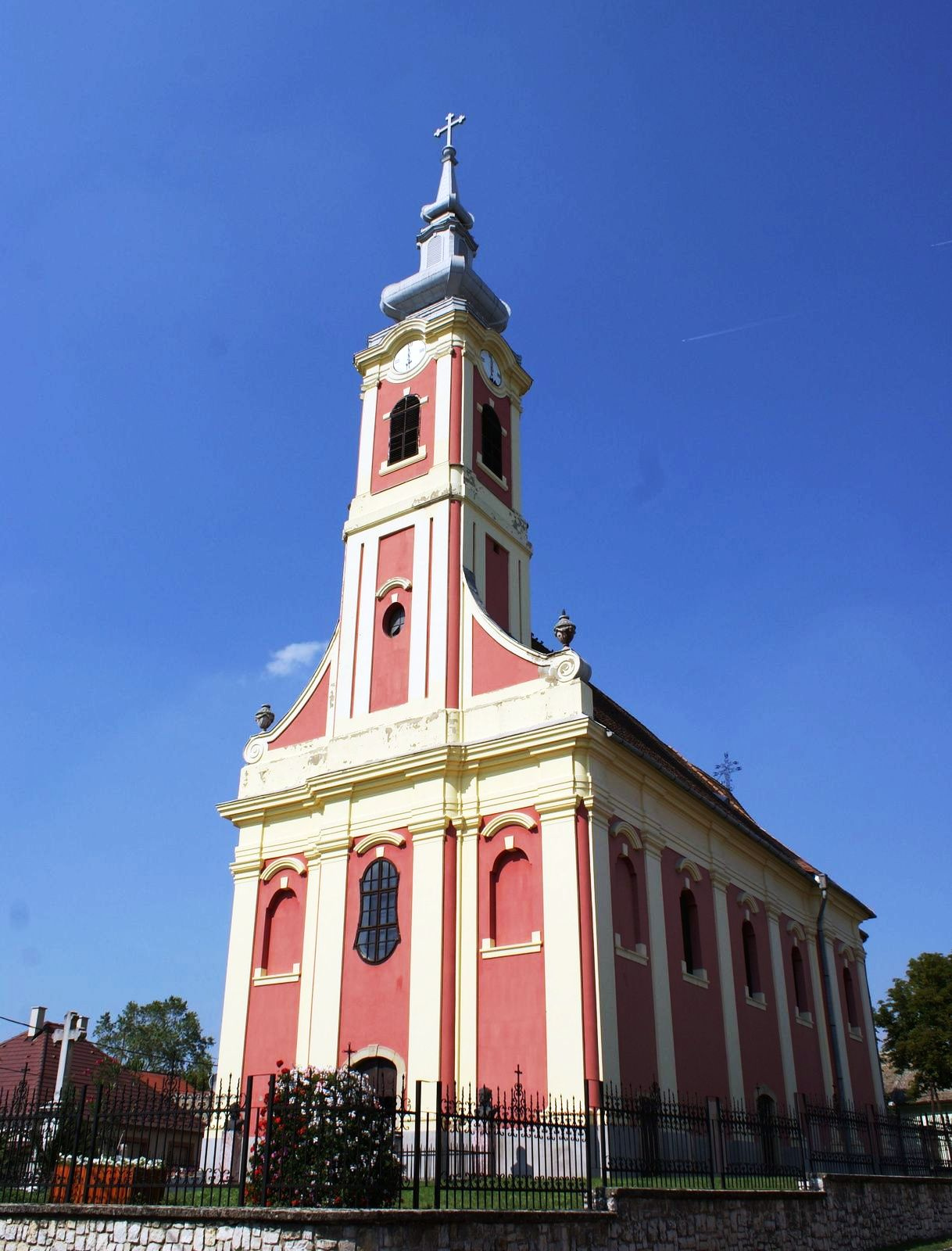
- Church of the Transfer of the Relics of the Holy Father Nicholas
- 46°10′56″N 18°57′00″E
- Location: Baja, Bács-Kiskun County
- Country: Hungary
- Denomination: Serbian Orthodox Church

History
- Status: Church
- Dedication: Saint Nicholas

Architecture
- Functional status: Active
- Style: Baroque
- Years built: 1775

Administration
- Archdiocese: Eparchy of Buda

The Church of the Transfer of the Relics of the Holy Father Nicholas (Serbian: Црква преноса моштију светог оца Николаја, romanized: Crkva prenosa moštiju svetog oca Nikolaja; Hungarian: Szent Miklós Görögkeleti Plébániatemplom) is an Eastern Orthodox church located in Baja, Hungary. It is under jurisdiction of the Eparchy of Buda of the Serbian Orthodox Church.

The church is located in the central part of the old town of Baja with Serb community institutions in the nearby building. The church is the oldest out of three Serbian Orthodox churches in the town, two of which survived until today. The iconostasis was built by the Markoviny brothers in the 18th century. The paintings of the iconostasis were done by a Belgrade icon painter Arszenije Teodorovity in 1792.

== See also ==
- Eparchy of Buda
- Serbs of Hungary
