= Church of the Transfer of the Relics of the Holy Father Nicholas, Dunaújváros =

Serbian Orthodox church in Dunaújváros, Hungary

Church of the Transfer of the Relics of the Holy Father Nicholas
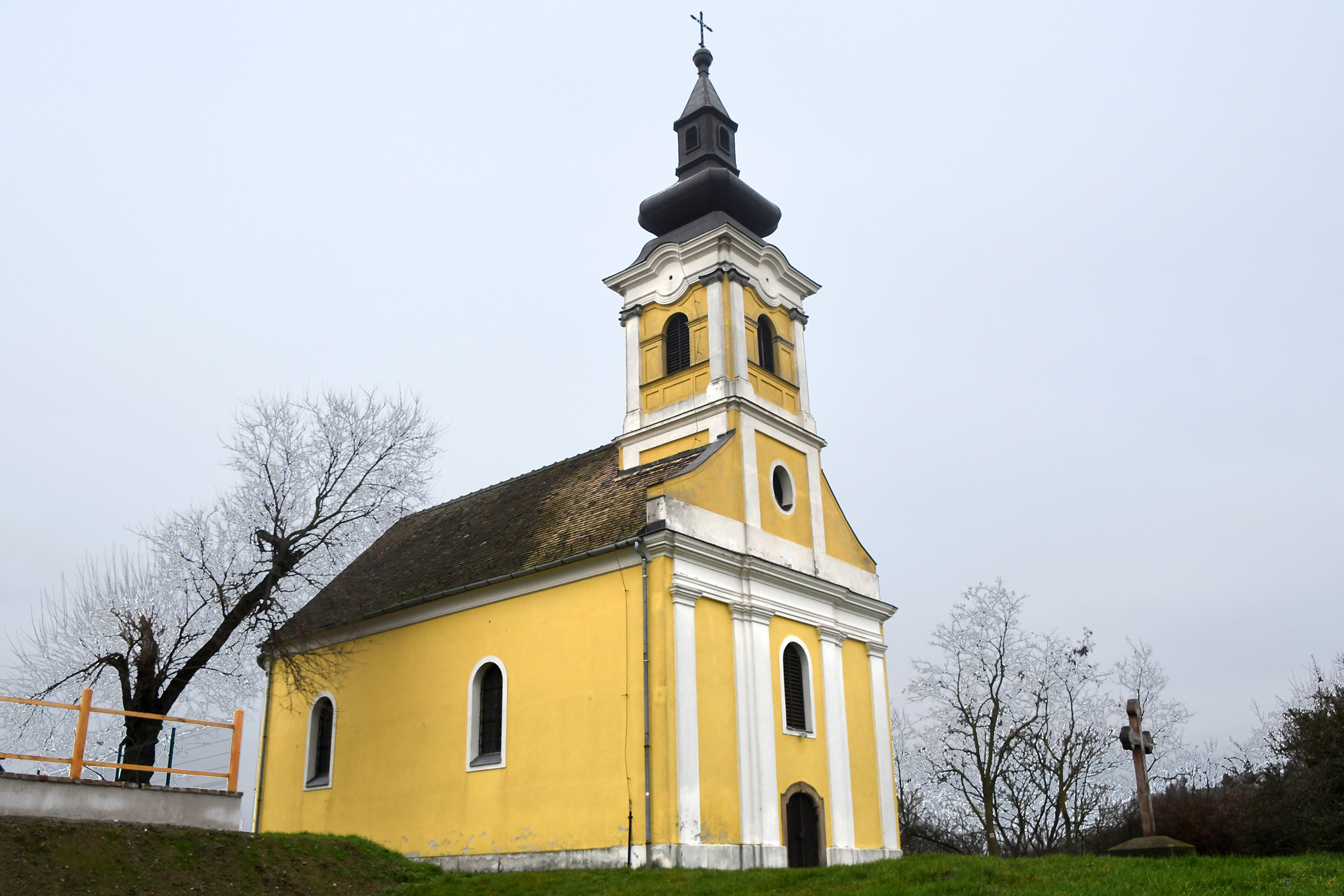
- Location: Dunaújváros, Fejér County
- Country: Hungary
- Denomination: Serbian Orthodox Church

History
- Status: Church
- Dedication: Saint Nicholas

Architecture
- Functional status: Active
- Style: Baroque
- Years built: 1786

Administration
- Archdiocese: Eparchy of Buda

The Church of the Transfer of the Relics of the Holy Father Nicholas (Serbian: Црква преноса моштију светог оца Николаја, romanized: Crkva prenosa moštiju svetog oca Nikolaja; Hungarian: Szent Miklós Görögkeleti Plébániatemplom) is an Eastern Orthodox church located in Dunaújváros, Hungary. It is under jurisdiction of the Eparchy of Buda of the Serbian Orthodox Church.

The church was built in 1786. It is a single-nave, east-facing structure located on a high hill. Its architectural design includes a central tower with a distinctive spire and a semi-circular sanctuary. Situated on the castle hill, it is among the oldest churches in the region.

== History ==
In 1690, at the invitation of Emperor Leopold I, orthodox people in the Balkans joined the fight against the Ottoman Empire, and after the lost battle, 37,000 Serbian families fled to Hungary during the Great Migrations of the Serbs. Larger numbers of Serbs arrived in Pentele, which led to the town being renamed Rácpentele streaming from the word Rascians, a historical term for Serbs. In 1777, construction began on the current church, replacing the small and ruined one. The construction was completed in 1786. The church's Serbian-style low iconostasis was created by a group of painters from Moschopolis, probably working in Ráckeve, in the 1780s. Between the two World Wars, the Rác Church had a tin roof. However, due to the war, it was severely damaged in several places and only received a new roof and spire in 1992.

== See also ==
- Eparchy of Buda
- Serbs of Hungary
