= Church of Saint Nicholas, Eger =

Serbian Orthodox church in Eger, Hungary

Church of Saint Nicholas
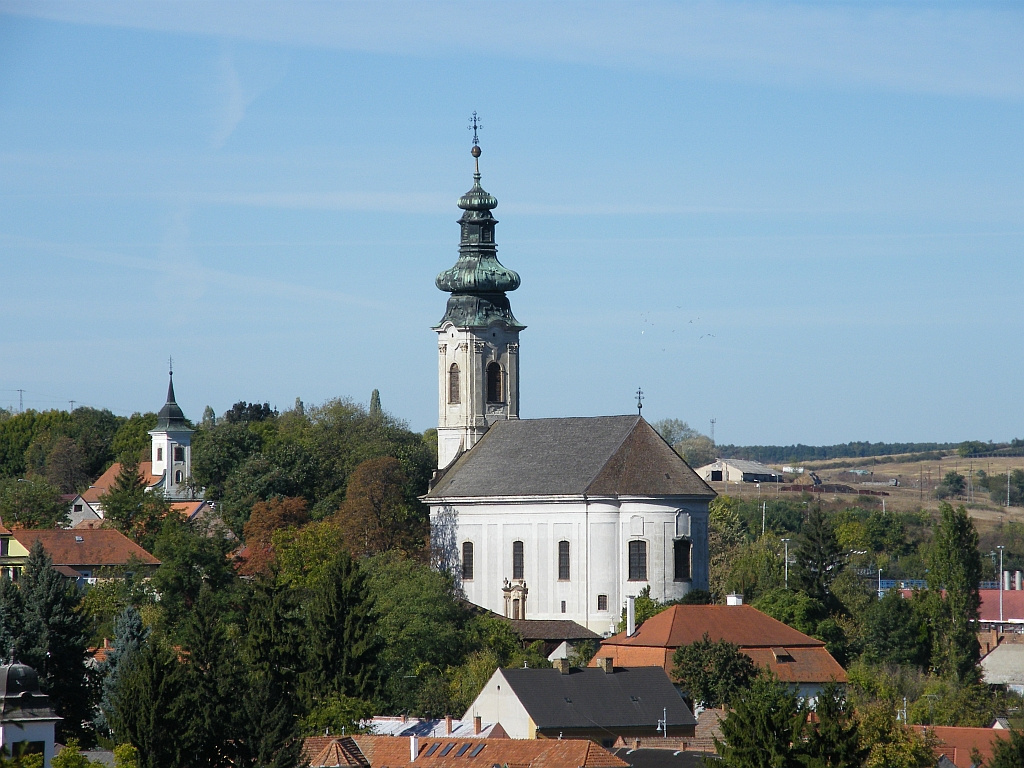
- Church of Saint Nicholas
- Church of Saint Nicholas
- 47°54′29″N 20°22′14″E
- Location: Eger, Heves County
- Country: Hungary
- Denomination: Serbian Orthodox Church

History
- Status: Church
- Dedication: Saint Nicholas

Architecture
- Functional status: Active
- Style: Neo-classicism
- Years built: 1788

Administration
- Archdiocese: Eparchy of Buda

The Church of Saint Nicholas (Serbian: Црква светог Николе, romanized: Crkva svetog Nikole, Hungarian: Szent Miklós templom) is an Eastern Orthodox church located in Eger, Hungary. It is under jurisdiction of the Eparchy of Buda of the Serbian Orthodox Church.

The church was constructed between 1785 and 1799, designed by the city architect János Povolni with the permission of the Holy Roman Emperor Joseph II. The church is colloquially known as the Rác Church streaming from the word Rascians, a historical term for Serbs.

== See also ==
- Eparchy of Buda
- Serbs of Hungary
