= Church of Saint Michael the Archangel, Szentendre =

Serbian Orthodox church in Szentendre, Hungary

Church of Saint Michael the Archangel
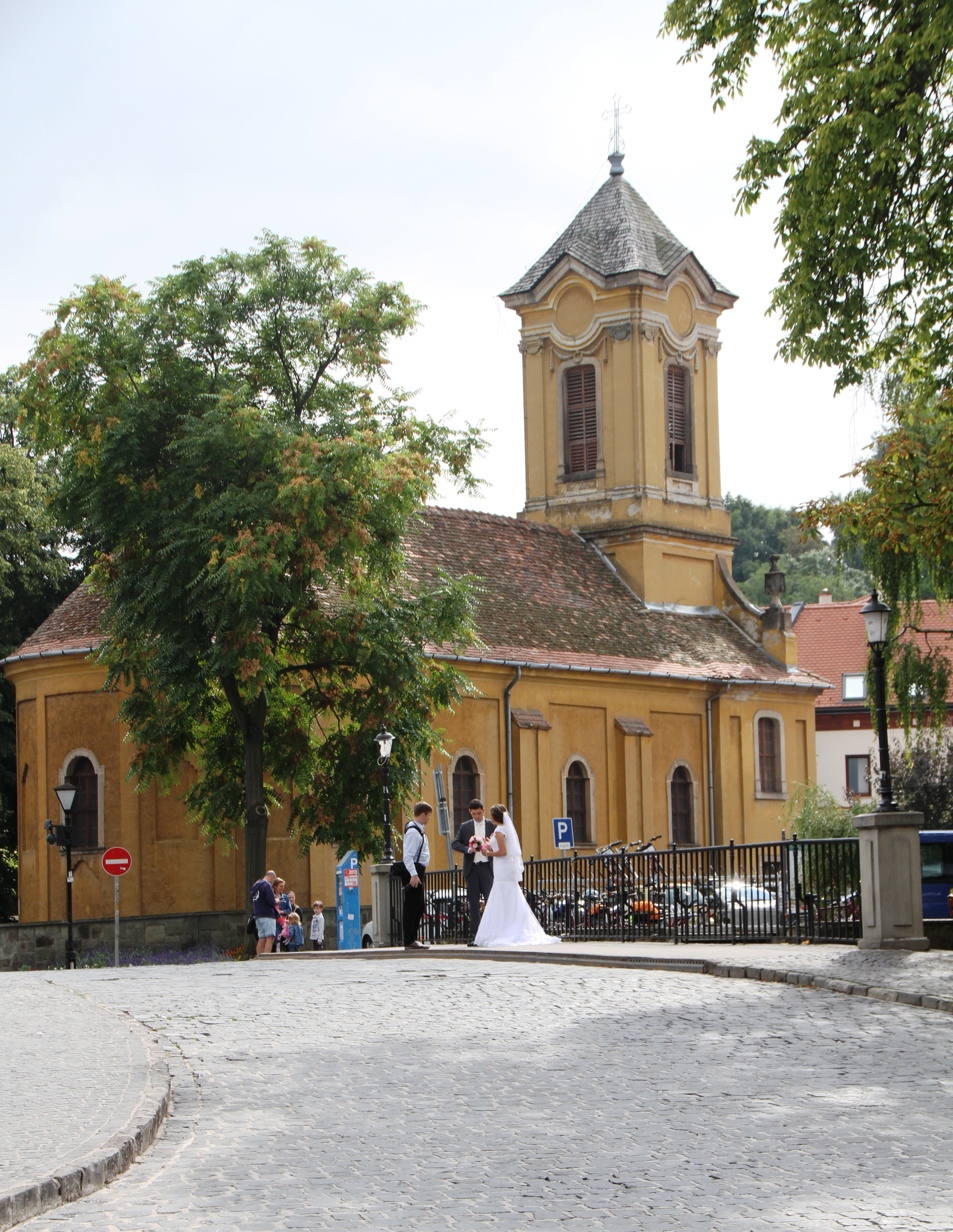
- Church of Saint Michael the Archangel
- Church of Saint Michael the Archangel
- 47°39′54″N 19°04′33″E
- Location: Szentendre
- Country: Hungary
- Denomination: Serbian Orthodox Church

History
- Status: Church
- Dedication: Saint Michael the Archangel

Architecture
- Functional status: Active
- Style: Baroque

Administration
- Archdiocese: Eparchy of Buda

The Church of Saint Michael the Archangel (Serbian: Црква светог арханђела Михаила, romanized: Crkva svetog arhanđela Mihaila; Hungarian: Szent Mihály arkangyal templom), also known as the Požarevac Church (Serbian: Пожаревачка црква, romanized: Požarevačka crkva; Hungarian: Pozsarevacska szerb ortodox templom) is an Eastern Orthodox church located in Szentendre, Hungary. It is under jurisdiction of the Eparchy of Buda of the Serbian Orthodox Church.

The church was named after the town of Požarevac in Serbia and is one of a few of Serbian Orthodox churches in the town. It was completed in 1759 and consecrated in 1763. According to tradition, it was built next to the Bučina stream. The neighborhood around the church was also known as Požarevačka Mahala. The iconostasis of the church is older than the present church since it was originally installed in the "old" Cathedral Church in 1742. The church was damaged during a major flood in 1838 but was soon renovated. The latest renovation of the church took place in 2018.

== See also ==
- Eparchy of Buda
- Serbs of Hungary
