= Church of Saint Nicholas (Győr, Hungary) =

Serbian church in Győr, Hungary

Church of the Translation of the Relics of Saint Nicholas
- Church of the Translation of the Relics of Saint Nicholas
- 47°40′55.8″N 17°37′11.8″E
- Location: Bálint Mihály u. 54, Győr
- Country: Hungary
- Denomination: Serbian Orthodox Church
- Churchmanship: Greek Catholic (since 1997)

History
- Founded: 1511
- Dedication: Saint Nicholas

Architecture
- Style: Baroque
- Completed: 1511 (original church); rebuilt 1729; present building, late 18th century

Administration
- Diocese: Eparchy of Buda

The Church of Saint Nicholas is one of the historical churches of the Serbian Orthodox Church in Győr, Hungary. It belong to the Eparchy of Buda of the Serbian Orthodox Church. In 1997, the church was permanently entrusted to the Greek Catholic Church, and it has since been under the jurisdiction of the Holy See.

The church is dedicated to the Translation of the Relics of Saint Nicholas.

== History ==
The original Church of Saint Nicholas in Győr was built by Serbian Šajkaši in the early 16th century, dated to 1511.

In 1729, during the first half of the 18th century, the church was either restored or substantially rebuilt. The present building was completed in the late 18th century in the Late Baroque style. Its iconostasis features Neoclassical decoration, while the icons were painted by an unidentified Greek artist who had received artistic training in Vienna.

The church in Győr is a parish of the Eparchy of Buda, whose Bishopric is Archpriest Zoran Ostojić. The parish priest of the church in Győr is Hieromonk Varnava (Knežević).

== See also ==
- Eastern Orthodoxy in Hungary
- Serbs in Hungary
- Serbian Orthodox Church
- Eparchy of Buda
- Győr
