= Transfiguration Church, Szentendre =

Serbian Orthodox church in Szentendre, Hungary

Coordinates: 47°40′08″N 19°04′33″E

Transfiguration Church
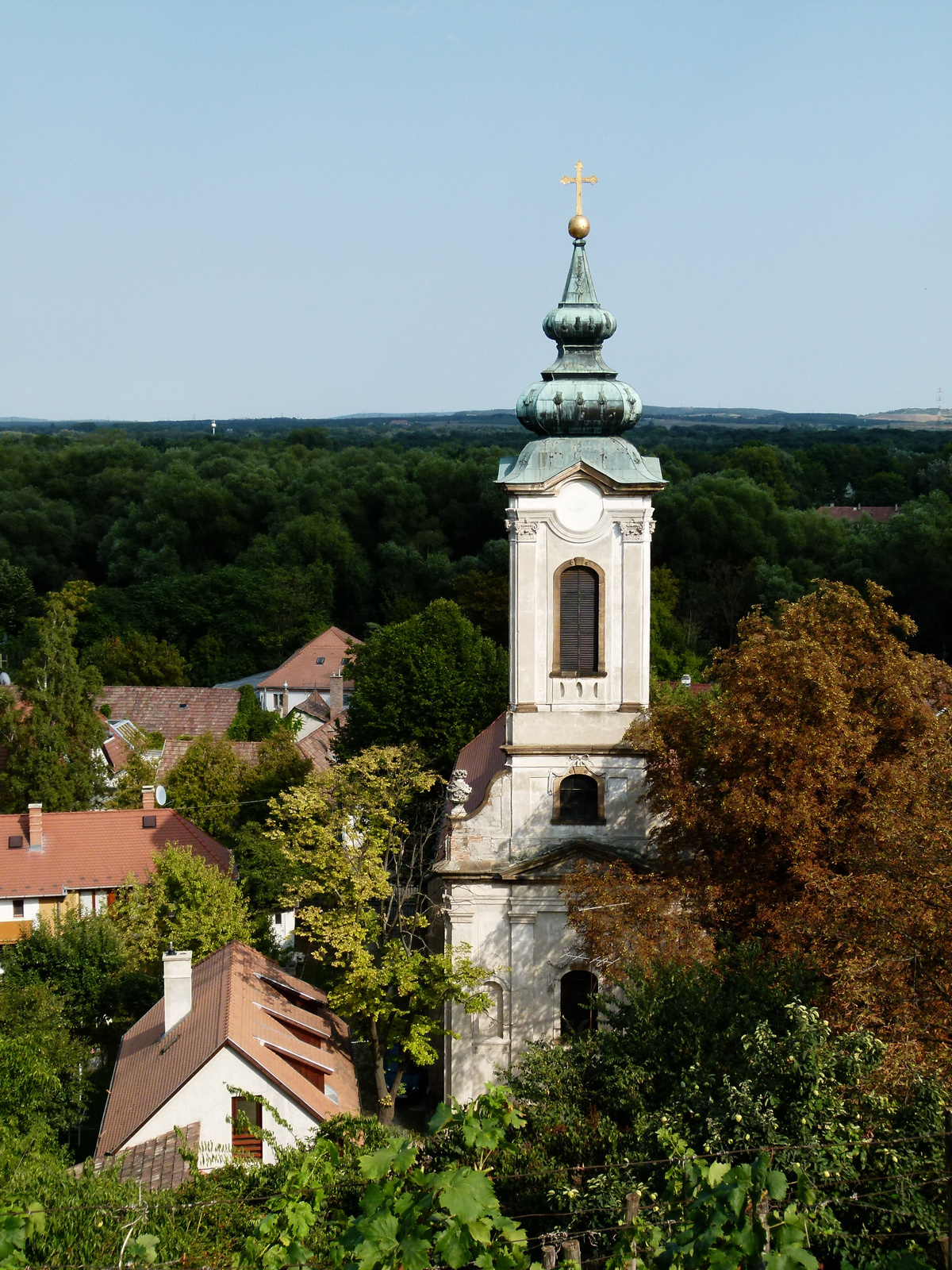
- Transfiguration Church
- Location: Szentendre
- Country: Hungary
- Denomination: Serbian Orthodox Church

History
- Dedication: Transfiguration
- Consecrated: 1741–1746

Administration
- Archdiocese: Eparchy of Buda

The Transfiguration Church (Serbian: Преображенска црква, romanized: Preobraženska crkva; Hungarian: Színeváltozása templom) is an Eastern Orthodox church located in Szentendre, Hungary. It is under jurisdiction of the Eparchy of Buda of the Serbian Orthodox Church.

The church was constructed from 1741 until 1746. In 1980 the church appeared on a Hungarian postal stamp. The church is also the home of the Museum of the Eparchy of Buda. The museum collection includes artwork from the 14th to the 19th centuries. It is only open for the Feast of the Transfiguration around August.

== See also ==
- Eparchy of Buda
- Serbs of Hungary
