= Church of Saint George, Pomáz =

Serbian Orthodox church in Pomáz, Hungary

Church of Saint George
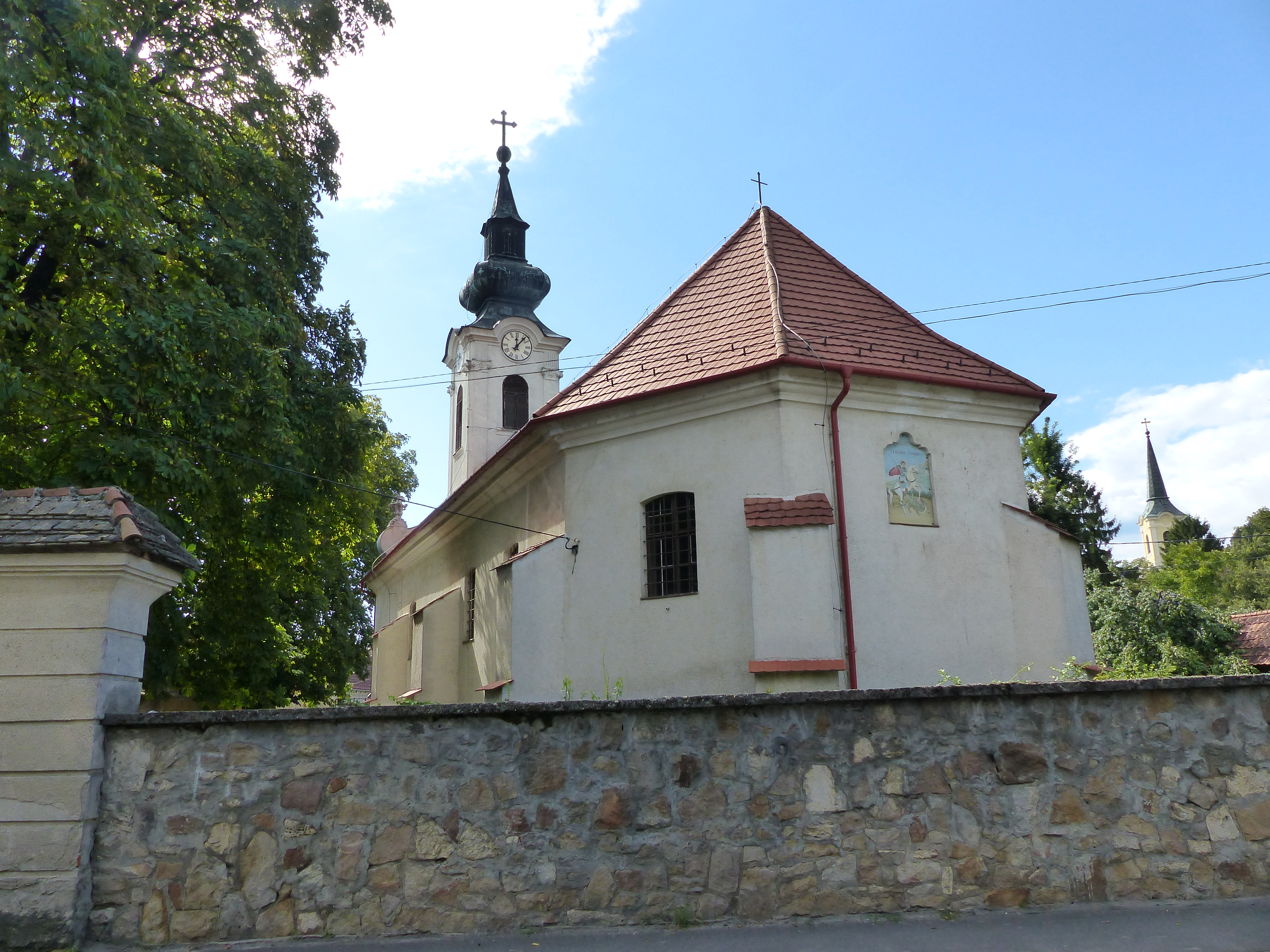
- Church of Saint George
- Church of Saint George
- 47°38′59″N 19°01′14″E
- Location: Pomáz, Pest County
- Country: Hungary
- Denomination: Serbian Orthodox Church

History
- Status: Church
- Dedication: Saint George

Architecture
- Functional status: Active
- Style: Neo-classicism
- Years built: 1722

Administration
- Archdiocese: Eparchy of Buda

The Church of Saint George (Serbian: Црква Светог Георгија, romanized: Crkva Svetog Georgija; Hungarian: Szent György templom) is an Eastern Orthodox church located in Pomáz, Hungary. It is under jurisdiction of the Eparchy of Buda of the Serbian Orthodox Church.

The first settlement of Eastern Orthodox Serb population in the region started before the Great Migrations of the Serbs of 1690 while modern day orthodox church is one of the oldest Serbian churches in Hungary. The building was built between 1719 and 1722.

== See also ==
- Eparchy of Buda
- Serbs of Hungary
