= Church of Saint John the Baptist, Székesfehérvár =

Serbian Orthodox church in Székesfehérvár, Hungary

Church of Saint John the Baptist
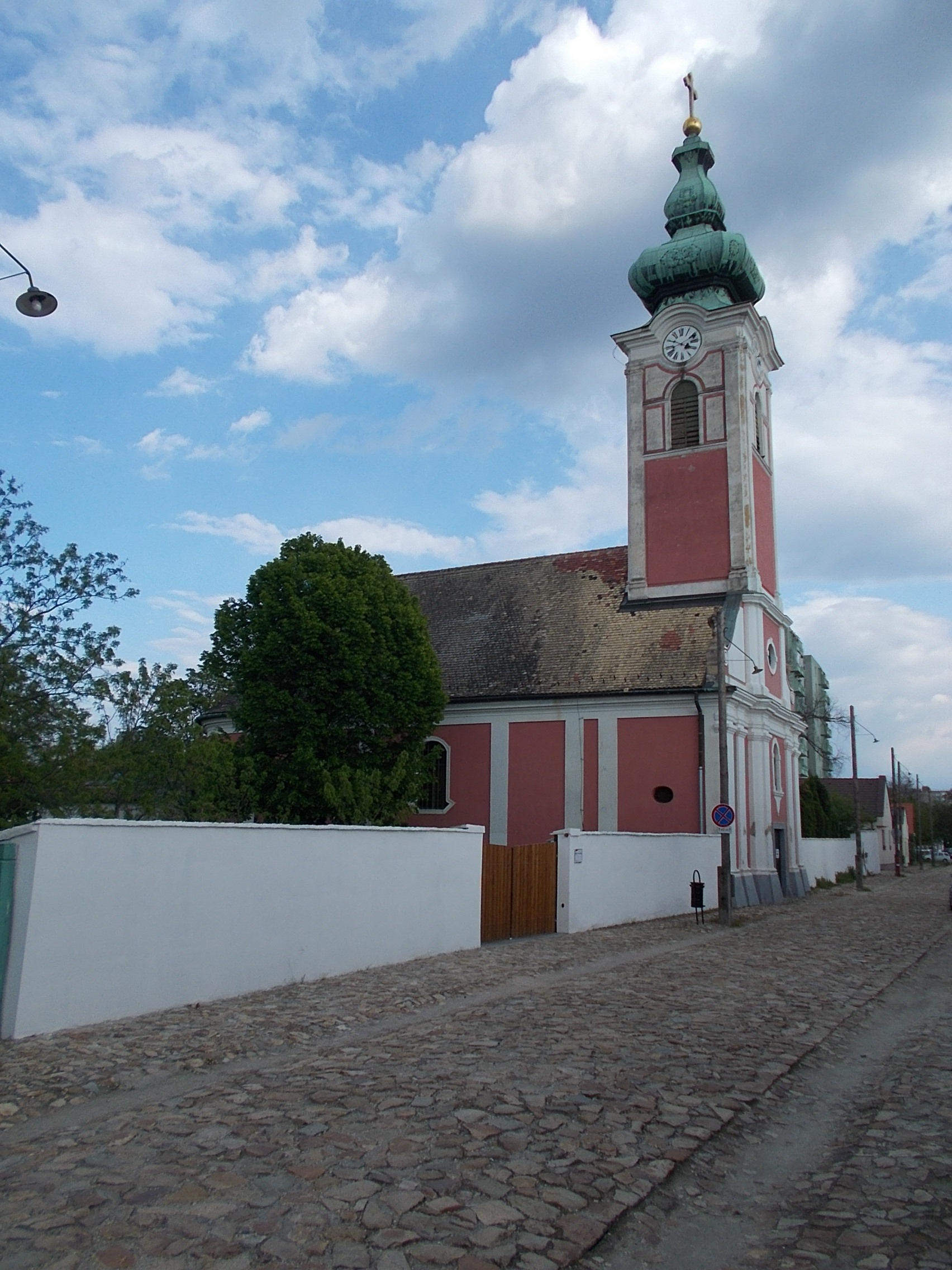
- Church of Saint John the Baptist
- Church of Saint John the Baptist
- 47°11′26″N 18°24′07″E
- Location: Székesfehérvár, Fejér County
- Country: Hungary
- Denomination: Serbian Orthodox Church

History
- Status: Church
- Dedication: John the Baptist

Architecture
- Functional status: Active
- Style: Neo-classicism
- Years built: 1771

Administration
- Archdiocese: Eparchy of Buda

The Church of Saint John the Baptist (Serbian: Црква светог Јована Крститеља, romanized: Crkva svetog Jovana Krstitelja; Hungarian: Keresztelő Szent János-templom) is an Eastern Orthodox church located in Székesfehérvár, Hungary. It is under jurisdiction of the Eparchy of Buda of the Serbian Orthodox Church.

Church was built in 1771. The interior showcase elaborate decorations, with a Rococo-style iconostasis unique in Hungary. The paintings of Katarina Ivanović, the first female Serbian artist, are permanently exhibited, showcasing scenes from the life of the Serbian community in Székesfehérvár. The church is built at the site of an older wooden church of St. Nicolas from 1733. The oldest icon, the Vladimir Mother of God, was made in the 15th century and might have been brought by the first Serbian settlers at the beginning of the 17th century.

== See also ==
- Eparchy of Buda
- Serbs of Hungary
