= Annunciation Church, Szentendre =

Serbian Orthodox church in Szentendre, Hungary

Coordinates: 47.6683°N 19.0828°E

Annunciation Church
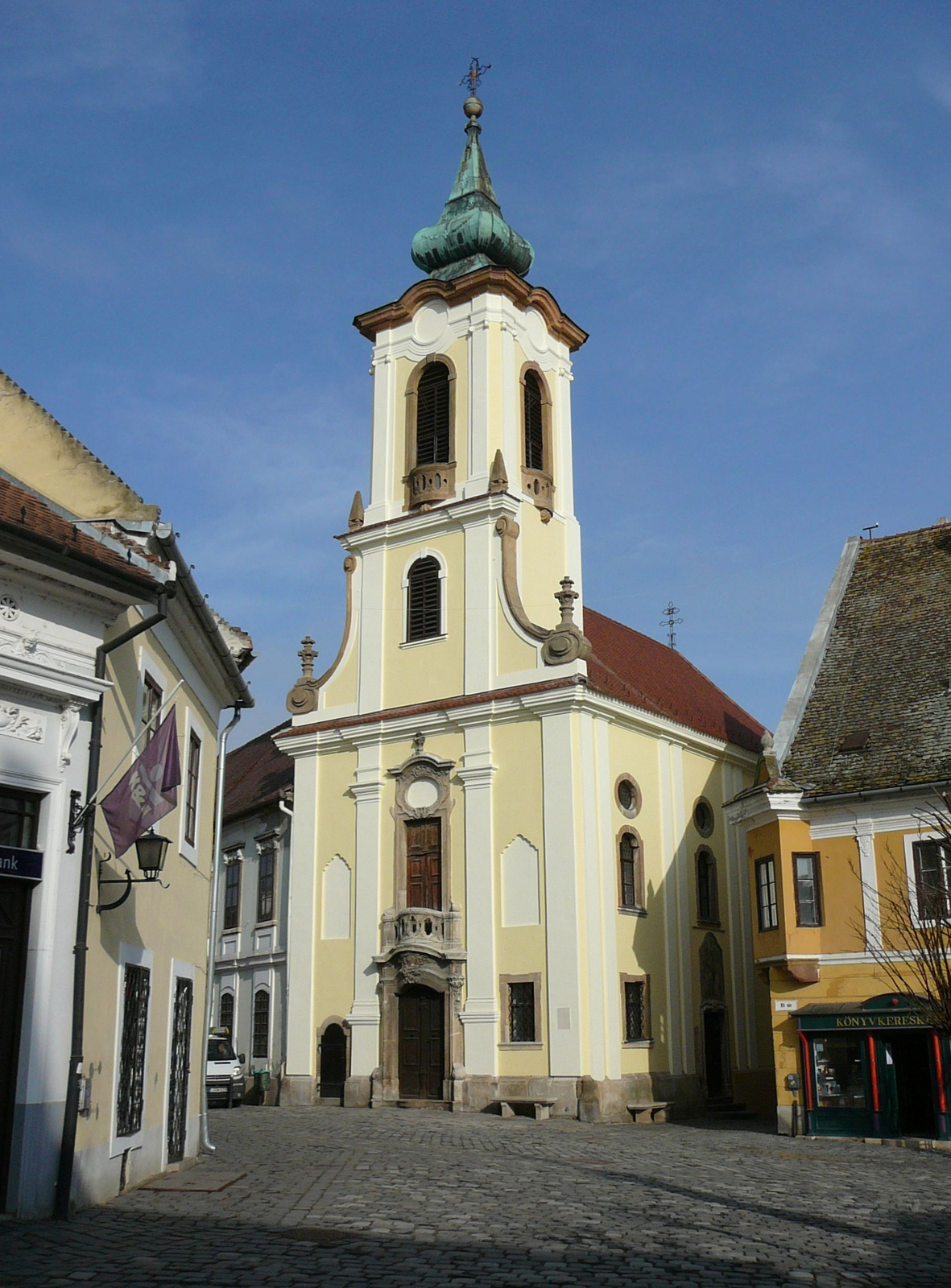
- Annunciation Church
- Location: Szentendre
- Country: Hungary
- Denomination: Serbian Orthodox Church

History
- Dedication: Annunciation

Administration
- Archdiocese: Eparchy of Buda

The Annunciation Church (Serbian: Благовештанска црква, romanized: Blagoveštenska crkva, Hungarian: Angyali üdvözlet templom) is an Eastern Orthodox church located in Szentendre, Hungary. It is under jurisdiction of the Eparchy of Buda of the Serbian Orthodox Church.

== See also ==
- Eparchy of Buda
- Serbs of Hungary
