= Majs =

Majs Maisch
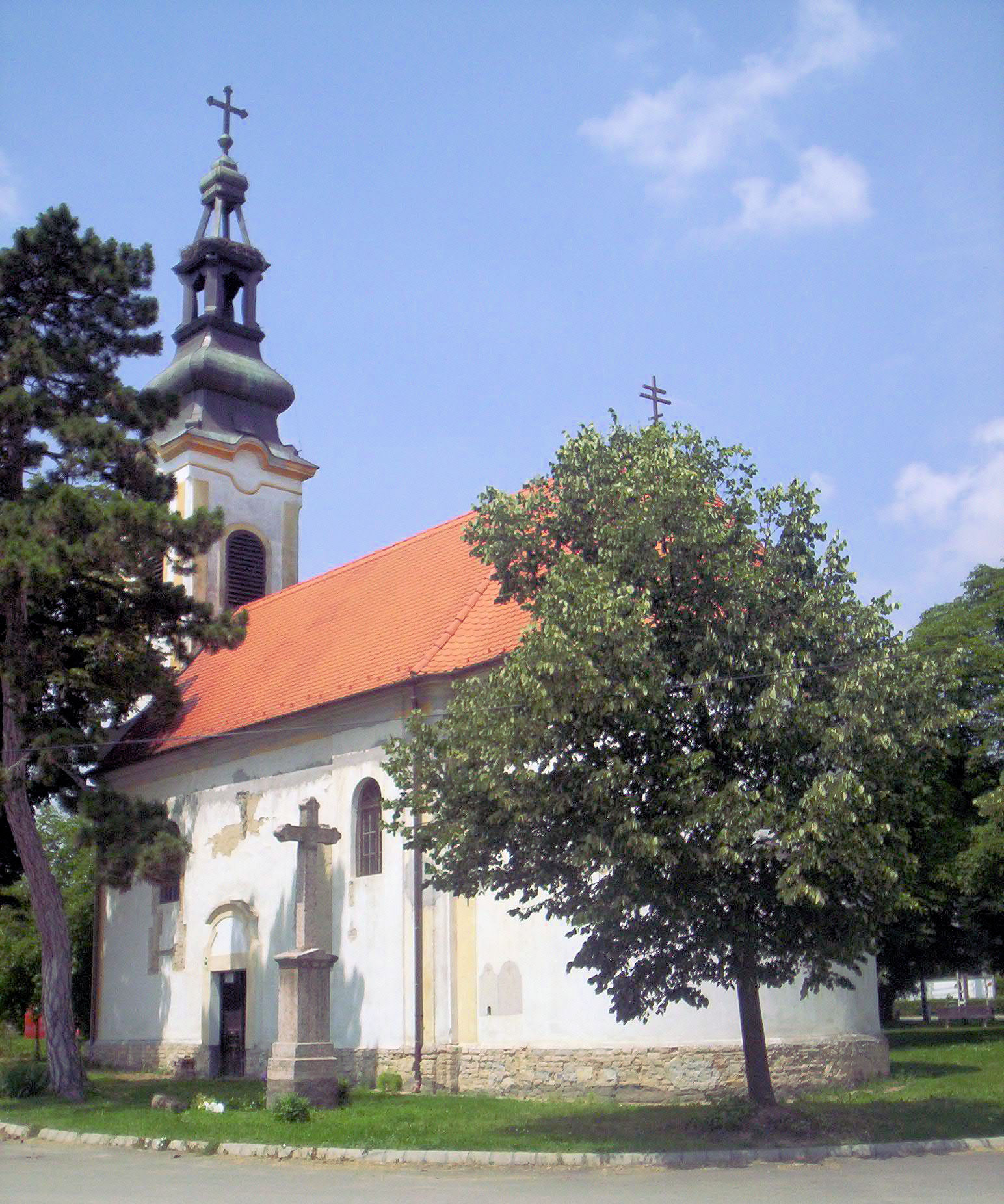
- Serbian Church of Saint Paraskevas

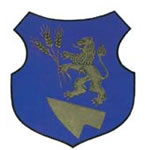
- Coat of arms
- Interactive map of Majs
- Location of Majs
- Coordinates: 45°54′30″N 18°36′06″E
- Country: Hungary
- County: Baranya County

Area
  - Total: 32.06 km^{2} (12.38 sq mi)

Population (2004)
  - Total: 1,077
  - Density: 33.59/km^{2} (87.0/sq mi)
- Time zone: UTC+1 (CET)
  - Summer (DST): UTC+2 (CEST)
- Postal code: 7783
- Area code: 69
- Website: https://majs.hu/

Majs (German: Maisch; Serbian: Мајша, romanized: Majša or Мајиш, romanized: Majiš) is a village in Baranya County, Hungary. Residents are Magyars, with a minority of Danube Swabians and Serbs.

Until the end of World War II, the majority of the inhabitants were Danube Swabians, also called locally as Stifolder, because their ancestors arrived in the 17th and 18th centuries from Fulda (district). Most of the former German settlers were expelled to allied-occupied Germany and allied-occupied Austria in 1945–1948, pursuant to the Potsdam Agreement. Only a few Germans of Hungary live there, the majority today are the descendants of Hungarians from the Czechoslovak–Hungarian population exchange. They occupied the houses of the former Danube Swabian inhabitants.

== Notablesights ==
- Serbian Orthodox Church, that was built in the beginning of the 17th century. This church is unique in Hungary and Central Europe, as its iconostas was stone built, instead of the usual wooden material.

== Natives ==
- Béla Linder, military officer and politician
