= Vasilije Damjanović =

Serbian writer

Vasilije Damjanović (Serbian Cyrillic:Василије Дамјановић; Sombor, Habsburg Empire, April 1734 - Sombor, 1792) was a Serbian writer, merchant, senator and municipal judge.

== Biography ==
In the period from 1747 to 1753 Vasilije Damjanović attended the famed Protestant Lyceum in Pozun (Bratislava) where he came under the influence of astronomer Christian Adolf Pescheck (1676–1744), who wrote a large number of textbooks and was the first writer to consider seriously the methods of teaching mathematics, the instruction of analytical geometry, calculus, physics and astronomy. It is known that Damjanović traveled a lot throughout Europe and that he studied in Venice. He was well-educated and fluent in several languages. Damjanović was a senator in the Hungarian diet and a municipal judge in Sombor (then part of the Habsburg Empire). Serbian polymath Zaharije Orfelin (1726–1785) spoke highly of him, writing that Damjanović's knowledge of arithmetic as well as Latin, German, French, Italian, Greek, Romanian and Hungarian languages were outstanding.

The Serbian merchant, Hungarian senator and municipal judge Vasilije Damjanović had more secular interests; though he wrote in Serbian vernacular, what he wrote was the first Serbian undergraduate textbook on mathematics with the following long-winded title so common of the era: "Nova serbskaja aritmetika ili prostoe nastavlenie k Hesapu iz raznych knig sobrano, novymi primery kratcojsim obrazom izjasneno, k upotrbleniju serbskija ucascijesja junosti izdano ot Vasilija Damjanovića, V Mletkach (in Venice), 1767." The nature of the language of the "Aritmetika" has been previously commented on but only very briefly. Acclaimed Slavist Nikita Ilyich Tolstoi (1923-1996) has stated that it has a Russian basis that is interspersed with Serbianisms and Slavonicisms but adds, "not only advocated the vernacular in literature but also to a large extent succeeded in using it as the literary language in all the works". Even such Serbian literary men of the Enlightenment as Zaharije Orfelin, called for the incorporation of the spoken language into Serbian literature, and Dositej Obradović, encouraging it during through his own teachings and literary work. Jovan Rajić too had in 1764 published two translations from Russian – "Slovo o gresnom celoveku" and "Propoved ili slovo o osuzdeniji" – both largely in the vernacular although on the title page the language described was slavenoserbski', Slavonic-Serbian. Despite this early appearance of the vernacular in Serbian literature it was not until the 1770s and 1780s with the reform of the Habsburg school system and the accession of the enlightened Joseph II, Holy Roman Emperor and his subsequent church reform, that writers such as Dositej Obradović, Emanuilo Janković, Jovan Rajić, Pavle Julinac and others were able to fully exercise and realize their vision without undue censorship. Damjanović, Orfelin, Rajić, Dositej (Obradović), Julinac, and Janković are considered to have had a seminal influence on the use of the vernacular in published literature.

As far as we know, seven copies of Damjanović's "Aritmetika" have been preserved. Three of them are stored in the Matica Srpska Library in Novi Sad, one in the National Library in Skopje, one in the National Library in Belgrade, one in the library of the Serbian Academy of Arts and Sciences in Belgrade and one in the Museum of Literature in Osijek. "Aritmetika" has 368 pages of text written in the Church Cyrillic script and consists of two parts divided into six and seven chapters respectively. Damjanović's "Aritmetika" was used by Teodor Janković-Mirijevski (1741–1814) who reformed school systems among the Serbian and Romanian Eastern Orthodox faithful in the Austrian Empire, and later at the request of Catherine the Great went on to make the same reforms in Imperial Russia. Meanwhile, Teodor Janković-Mirijevski, Aleksije Vezilić, Avram Mrazović, and Stefan Vujanovski adopted Damjanović's "Aritmetika" in their respective school districts as well.

The calculus books by Avram Mrazović (1794), Atanasije Dimitrijević Sekereš (an adaptation of John Felbinger's German textbook, 1777) and Jovan Došenović (1809) played a similar, enlightening role.
