= Atanasije Dimitrijević Sekereš =

Serbian jurist, writer and priest (1738–1800)

Atanasije Dimitrijević Sekereš (Serbian Cyrillic: Атанасије Димитријевић Секереш) or Athanasius Demetrovich Szekeres (18 January 1738, in Győr, today's Hungary – 30 April 1794, in Vienna, Austria) was a Serbian jurist, writer, and first Serbian Orthodox priest and later Uniate cleric, and Imperial-Royal Illyrian Court Deputation Councilor and censor of all Serbian, Romanian, Greek and Armenian books printed in the Habsburg monarchy. A proponent of enlightened absolutism, he held the office of censor of the Illyrian Deputation for two decades and was responsible for printing and reprinting hundreds of books during the reigns of Maria Theresa, Joseph II, Leopold II, and Francis II.

== Biography ==
He was born in Györ on the 18 of January 1738 and baptized in the Serbian Orthodox Church. His father, a small peasant-farmer, died when Atanasije was in his teens. He was brought up to farm work, but he cultivated all his leisure in reading, and when he was seventeen entered the University of Vienna Law School where he picked up Latin and German. Gradually, and by dint of infinite patience and concentration, the young man became a master of many languages, namely German, Hungarian, Romanian, Greek, Slovak, Russian, and Old Church Slavonic, all languages commonly read and spoken in the empire among Eastern Orthodox Slavs and their co-religionists. Atanasije was a pragmatist who eventually in mid-1776 converted to Roman Catholicism (Uniate) in order to secure his future. But, from then on he became one of the most hated and vilified persons amongst his compatriots in Habsburg lands and even in other neighboring Serbian lands, then under the Turkish yoke. It was that "struggle" that Sekereš alone chose to endure.

During his tenure as Austrian Royal censor of state publishing houses, he was responsible for printing and reprinting hundreds of textbooks, primers, catechisms, scholarly manuals, and popular literature for nationals who professed the Eastern Orthodox faith. Perhaps for Sekereš's lofty position, he was regarded with suspicion by most, though his friend Dositej Obradović, never doubted him.

He began his career as a censor in 1772 at the prestigious Publishing House of Josef von Kurzböck and a year later he got the lofty Latin title of Excelsae Deputationis Caesareo-Regiae in Illyris Athanasius Demetrovich Szekeres revisor. His mentors were Metropolitan Vićentije Jovanović Vidak and Adam František Kollár.

He was also active as a Serbian school reformer, translating most of the German textbooks, particularly those written by Johann Ignaz von Felbiger. He also collaborated with Teodor Janković Mirijevski.

On his watch, censorship was organized in a different way under his direction. He carried out a centralization of the censorship that was only partly successful, however, through his own design. He also tried to use scientific and rational aspects for the judgment of literature. He reprinted Slavic, Romanian, Greek and Armenian textbooks en masse for dissemination to all the district schools throughout the empire. Atanasije Dimitriejević Sekereš worked diligently at his office until the day he died on 30 April 1794 in Vienna.

== Works ==
He wrote and published "Sokroviste slavjanskog jezika", "Monašskaja pravila" (which appeared in 1777), "Memoiri". Also, he edited and published "Itika Jeropolitika" in Vienna in 1774. This miscellany of emblems, first printed in Kyiv in 1712, and for the express use of Serbian reading public, was reprinted, thanks to his efforts to leave a literary legacy for his fellow Slavs and others. The influence of this book can be seen both in the printing and in poetry (the poetry of Jovan Rajić) of that period. Much later, this book was mentioned in the rhetoric of Avram Mrazović in 1821. The importance and the influence of the emblematic in Serbian baroque can also be seen both in the painting art, graphic art, and in the newspaper articles of that period, as well.

== See also ==
- Stefan von Novaković
- Josef von Kurzböck
- Emanuilo Janković
- Damjan Kaulić
- Stefan von Novaković
- Vićentije Jovanović Vidak
- Uroš Nestorović
- Avram Mrazović
- Teodor Janković Mirijevski
- Dimitrie Eustatievici
- Stefan Vujanovski
- Dositej Obradović
