= Josif Jovanović Šakabenta =

Serbian cleric

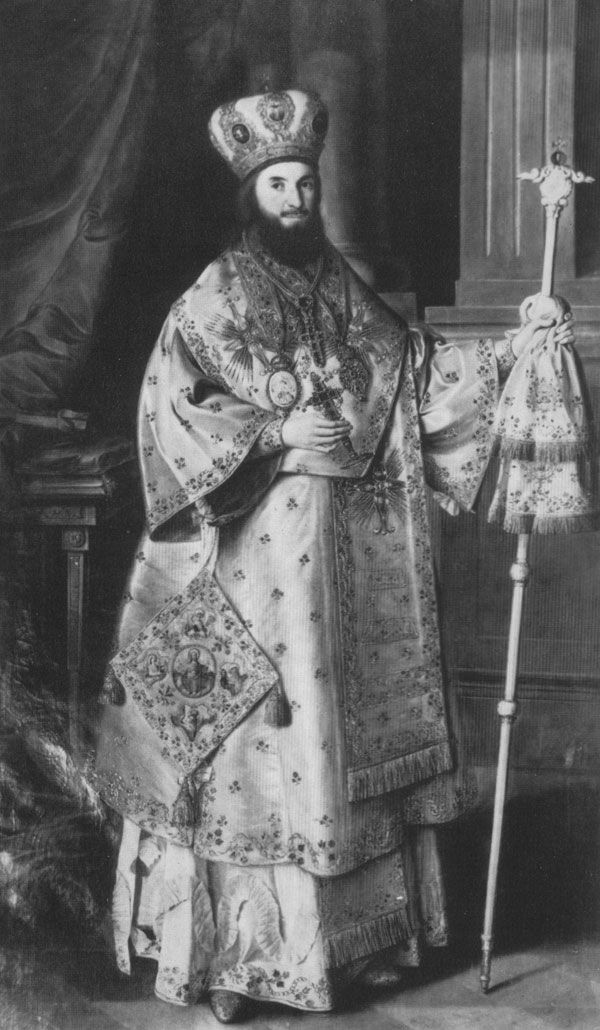
Portrait of Jovanović by Teodor Ilić Češljar, 1787

Josif Jovanović Šakabenta (1743 – 31 December 1805) was a bishop of the Serbian Orthodox Church in the eparchies part of the Habsburg Monarchy, in Croatia and Vojvodina.

== Early life ==
Josif Jovanović Šakabenta was born in 1743 in Irig to reverend father Andrija Jovanović, the younger brother of Patriarch Arsenije IV Jovanović Šakabenta and Peško Jovanović Šakabenta. Andrija died in 1759. The brothers, Arsenije, Andrija, and Peško and their family members, were granted Hungarian nobility on 11 September 1746.

Josif was ordained a presbyter and later elevated in 1774 by the Metropolitan Vićentije Jovanović Vidak to archimandrite.

On 31 July 1781, Metropolitan Mojsije Putnik consecrated him to the Bishop of Pakrac-Slavonia and the entire Varaždin Generalate. One of the first and most important jobs that the new Bishop of Pakrac had was to suppress the union at a time that it started a new and lively action in the General Staff of Varaždin.

During his visit to the parishes in the Varaždin Generalate in 1782, Bishop Josif received the Serbs back into Orthodoxy and "took vigorous steps to allow all the repentant unidentified people to return to Orthodoxy. Now there was a great persecution of all who declared that they were returning to Orthodoxy, and at the beginning of 1783, they were full of dungeons, especially in Belovar." In less than three years, Bishop Josif plowed a deep furrow in Slavonia. He "required the clergy to teach their people the truths of faith and morality". He paid special attention to the secret confession and gave special instructions to the priests. Given the greater number of chaplains in the diocese, he regulated the relations between parish priests and chaplains. The work was interrupted by the transfer of Bishop Josif to the Diocese of Bačka, where he remained for two years, from 1784 to 1786. He was installed for the Diocese of Bačka by Vice-Bishop Joseph Kovač and Bishop of Pakrac Pavle Avakumović on 25 April 1784.

Bishop Josif showed his organizational skills in the Diocese of Vršac and Diocese of Caransebeș. At his request, he was transferred in 1786 to the bishop of Vršac. In Vršac he founded a grammar school and a boarding school. In 1793, he rebuilt the Mesić Monastery, which was demolished by the Turks and was given the status of a free royal city by Vršac. As a member of the Timișoara Parliament in 1790, he fought for the establishment of the Serbian Duchy. In 1791 he received the title of the royal consular officer and in 1792, with other Orthodox bishops - a member and "magnate" of the assembly of the Hungarian Parliament.

He was Zaharije Orfelin's friend and patron.

He died in Vršac on 31 December 1805, and was buried in the Parish Church of St. Nicholas in a crypt in the nave.
