= Visarion Pavlović =

Serbian bishop and scholar

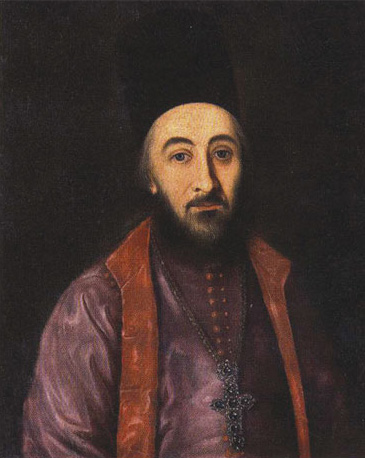
- Portrait of Visarion Pavlović
- Born: Висарион Павловић; 1670; Novi Sad
- Died: 18 October 1756 (aged 85–86)
- Occupations: scholar, educator and the Serbian Orthodox bishop

Visarion Pavlović (Serbian Cyrillic: Висарион Павловић; 1670 – 18 October 1756, in Novi Sad) was a scholar, pedagogue and the Serbian Orthodox bishop of the Eparchy of Bačka (1731–1756). He succeeded Sofronije Tomašević, and was succeeded by Mojsije Putnik.

== Biography ==
Visarion Pavlović received his education at the famed Kyiv-Mohyla Academy (later to change to Kyiv Theological Academy and Seminary; now the National University of Kyiv-Mohyla Academy), like many Serbs of his generation, namely Dionisije Novaković. As a scholar, he came from Kyiv (with a group of Russian professors and teachers, including Emanuel Kozačinski) to his homeland to become a teacher in the Archbishopric, and Putnik's predecessor on the episcopal throne. Soon after arriving, Visarion Pavlović became the founder and dean of the Gymnasium Latin-Slavic Academy of Our Lady.

His earlier expedition took him to Hilandar. In 1723, he became the patriarchal proto-saint, and from 1720 to 1730 he was a trustee and mediator between the Patriarchate of Peć and the Metropolis of Karlovac. In 1730, he became the archimandrite of the Krušedol monastery in Srem. He was ordained as the bishop of Bačka in May 1731.

The first schools in Vojvodina mentioned in records as early as 1726 were Roman Catholic primary schools in Novi Sad, and in 1731 there was the Gymnasium Latin-Slavic School of Our Lady founded and maintained by Pavlović. He held the title of the prefect of the Latino-Slavic college and other Serbian institutions in Novi Sad. Bishop Pavlović and the Serbian Orthodox Church Community were aware that only solid education in the Latin language could ensure a better future for the Serbian people in the Habsburg monarchy. Considering the fact that Serbs, in Novi Sad of that time, were a majority and in addition richer than the ethnic minorities, popular schools in Serbian existed as well.

With Pavlović's efforts, the first Slavic-Latin hospital was built in Novi Sad.

== See also ==
- Dimitrie Eustatievici
- Simeon Končarević
- Zaharije Orfelin
- Jovan Rajić
- Mojsije Putnik
- Emanuel Kozačinski

== Sources ==
- Vuković, Sava (1996). Brajković, Janko (ed.). Serbian hierars: from the ninth to the twentieth century (PDF). Evro. Archived from the original (PDF) on 2 December 2013.
