= Cathedral of the Dormition of the Theotokos, Szentendre =

Serbian Orthodox cathedral in Szentendre, Hungary

Cathedral of the Dormition of the Theotokos
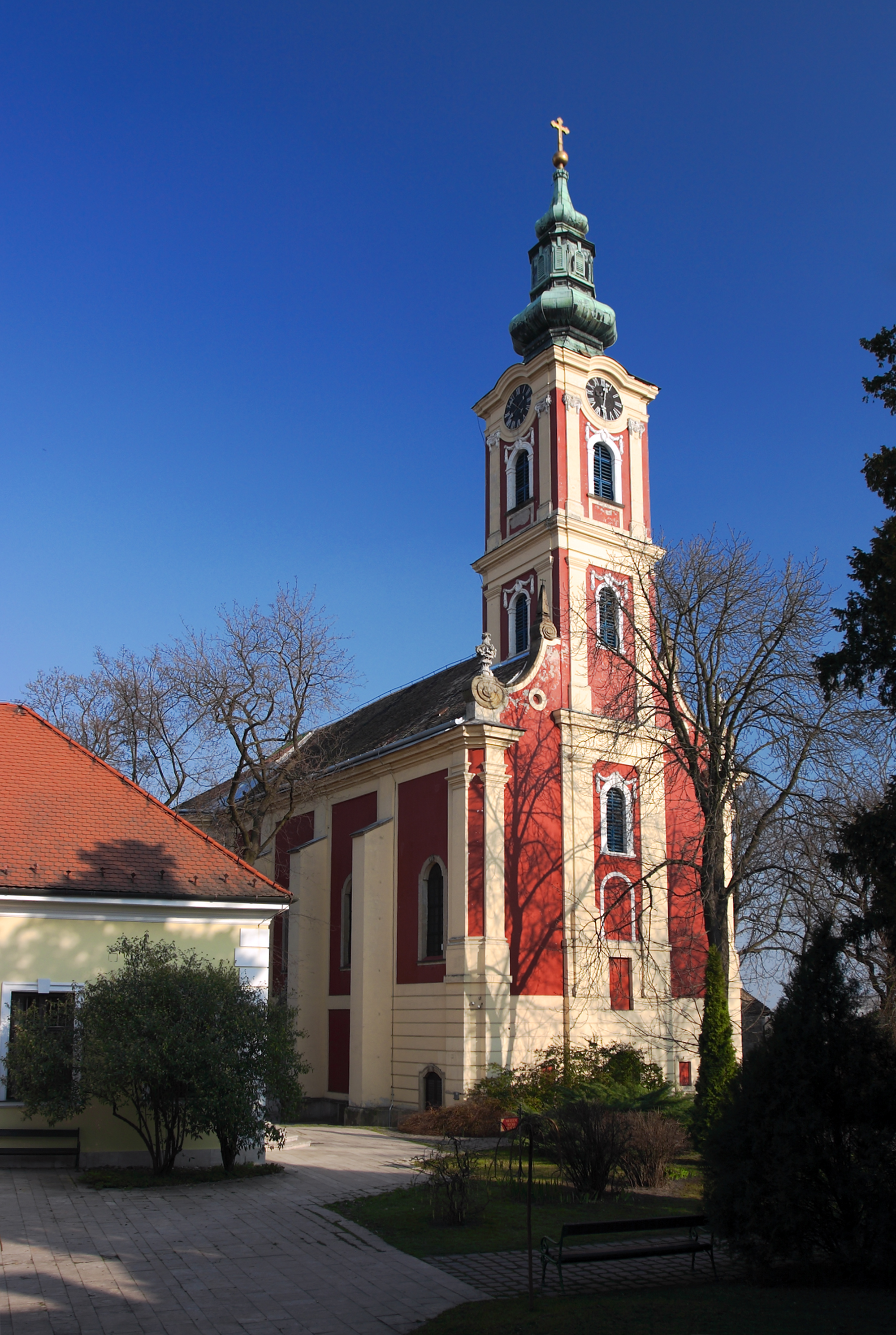
- Cathedral of the Dormition of the Theotokos, pictured in 2019
- Cathedral of the Dormition of the Theotokos
- 47°40′08″N 19°04′33″E
- Location: Szentendre
- Country: Hungary
- Denomination: Serbian Orthodox Church

History
- Status: Church
- Dedication: Dormition of the Theotokos

Architecture
- Functional status: Active
- Style: Baroque

Administration
- Archdiocese: Eparchy of Buda

The Cathedral of the Dormition of the Theotokos (Serbian: Саборна црква Успенија пресвете Богородице, romanized: Saborna crkva Uspenija presvete Bogorodice), also known as the Belgrade Cathedral (Hungarian: Belgrád-székesegyház), is an Eastern Orthodox church located in Szentendre, Hungary. It is under jurisdiction of the Eparchy of Buda of the Serbian Orthodox Church and serves as its cathedral church.

Cathedral of the Dormition of the Theotokos is the main and largest among Serbian Orthodox churches in Szentendre. The building is located right by the Episcopal Palace and the Serbian Orthodox Ecclesiastical Art Museum (established in 1964), surrounded by veteran trees. The church's bell tower, located on the main façade, is 48 meters high, making it the tallest tower in Szentendre.

== History ==
Serbs fleeing from the Ottoman conquest settled in Szentendre. The first larger groups arrived after the fall of Belgrade in 1521, but they settled in larger numbers around 1690. 1655 source indicate that the church had a separate cemetery next to the Kecskemét Gate. During the 1690 Great Migrations of the Serbs local Serb community in the town of Szentendre increased significantly turning it into one of the major cultural, religious and political centres of the Prečani Serbs during the Ottoman rule in Serbia, especially before the town of Sremski Karlovci developed into the new major centre as seat of the Metropolitanate of Karlovci (later Patriarchate of Karlovci). In 1696, Patriarch Arsenije III Crnojević sent a request to the Buda Chamber Administration to allocate his residence to Pest, but since this request was not approved the Serbian Orthodox Eparchy of Buda was established in Izbég (Szentendre).

Consecration of Dionisije Novaković as the Bishop of Buda in Szentendre, educated in what became the Kiev Theological Academy and subsequently teaching at the Latin-Slavonic school in Novi Sad, brought a new impetus to the development of the Serbian community in the town. The new bishop was influenced by Kiev Baroque and supported the construction of new churches. During his tenure, from 1749 to 1767, four more churches were built in the town, as well as several churches in other places of the Eparchy. The cathedral church was built on the site of an older church. The settlers from Belgrade built their cathedral with stone, which is why it is to this day referred to as the Belgrade Cathedral.

The Cathedral of the Dormition of the Theotokos was built in the period between 1756 and 1763 in Baroque style. The decorative work and furnishings were finished between 1765 and 1770. The ornate gate shows similarities to the gate of the Podmaniczky Castle in Aszód, designed by József Jung in 1767. The western part of the church was completed in 1770, and in 1777, during the tenure of Bishop Sofronije Kirilović, a bell tower was added. The masonry work was done by András Pfister, while the construction of the church garden's wall is attributed to Mihály Rombold. The decorative frames adorning the gate were created by master craftsman Márton Ginesser in 1772. In 1781, an iconostasis in the Rococo style was created by Vasilije Ostojić. The glasswork was completed in 1811 following the designs of Ferenc Fischer. The cathedral's spire was knocked down by a storm in 1881. The interior walls were repainted in 1883.

== See also ==
- Eparchy of Buda
- Serbs of Hungary
