= Sofronije Kirilović =

Serbian Orthodox bishop

Sofronije Kirilović (Serbian: Софроније Кириловић, Romanian: Sofronie Chirilovici; died 28 February 1786) was a Serbian Orthodox bishop in the Habsburg monarchy.

== Biography ==
=== Appointment to Transylvania ===
Following the October 1767 resignation of Dionisije Novaković as administrator of the Transylvania diocese, several proposals for a successor emerged. Maria Theresa named Jovan Đorđević to the office a year later. However, he did not have a chance to take up the position, as he became Metropolitan of Karlovci after a month. In December 1769, Đorđević called a church congress for the Serbs, and this meeting elected Kirilović, the former vicar of Novaković in the Eparchy of Buda, as the new bishop of Transylvania. In January 1770, the empress annulled the election on the basis that a Serbian congress could not elect a bishop for the Romanians of Transylvania, but at the same time named Kirilović the new bishop herself.

The same restrictions placed on Novaković were extended to the activity of Kirilović, with two additions. First, he was barred from interacting with his priests, particularly through canonical visits, except as authorized by the provincial government. Second, he was not to allow the presence of priests ordained outside Transylvania (i.e., in Moldavia and Wallachia), and was to denounce any he found. Also in 1770, the empress decided that all liturgical books for the Orthodox peoples of the Habsburg monarchy were to be printing in Vienna, in an effort directed against the importation of texts from Moldavia and Wallachia.

=== Activity in Sibiu ===
Unlike Novaković, who was merely locum tenens, Kirilović had the status of a regular bishop. Furthermore, his residence was fixed at Sibiu: the provincial government was located there, and he could be more easily supervised. Consecrated at Karlovci in May 1770, he was enthroned at Sibiu two months later. He lived in a rented house and had no church, but with the help of the authorities, placed the local Greek and Aromanian Orthodox under his jurisdiction. These individuals had their own church, probably on the site of the present cathedral. According to a 1772 census, the diocese numbered 558,076 members.

During his time in office, Sofronije met with difficulties from the Romanian Greek-Catholic Church. For instance, in 1772, the Orthodox church in Roșia Montană was seized with the help of the army, handed over to the Greek-Catholics and the parish priest arrested. Such incidents, combined with the restrictions and lack of a residence, led the bishop to request transfer to a Serbian diocese in September 1773. As successor, he recommended his secretary and interpreter, Dimitrie Eustatievici. Moreover, the local authorities had reported him to Vienna for impeding Greek-Catholic efforts at conversion.

=== Later years ===
In August 1774, the empress named Kirilović bishop of Buda, an act that discontented the Serbs, whose bishops had to be elected by the church congress. He served at Buda until 1781, when this body, following canon law, elected him Bishop of Timișoara. Meanwhile, although he had left Transylvania, he was still responsible for ordaining its priests. These were recommended to him by archpriest Ioan Popovici of Hondol, who was vicar of the vacant see. Only in 1784, after ten years, did a new bishop arrive; in the interim, Greek-Catholic activity measurably increased under Bishop Grigore Maior.

Sofronije ordained a number of Romanian priests at Buda and Timișoara; a number of their names are present in a document of 1805. The bishop died in 1786 and was buried in the Serbian Orthodox Cathedral in Timișoara.

== Notes ==
Eastern Orthodox Church titles
Preceded by Arsenije Radivojević	Bishop of Buda; 1775–1781	Vacant Title next held by Stefan Stratimirović
Preceded by Mojsej Putnik	Bishop of Temišvar; 1781–1786	Succeeded by Petar Petrović
