= Mojsije Putnik =

Serbian Metropolitan (1728–1790)

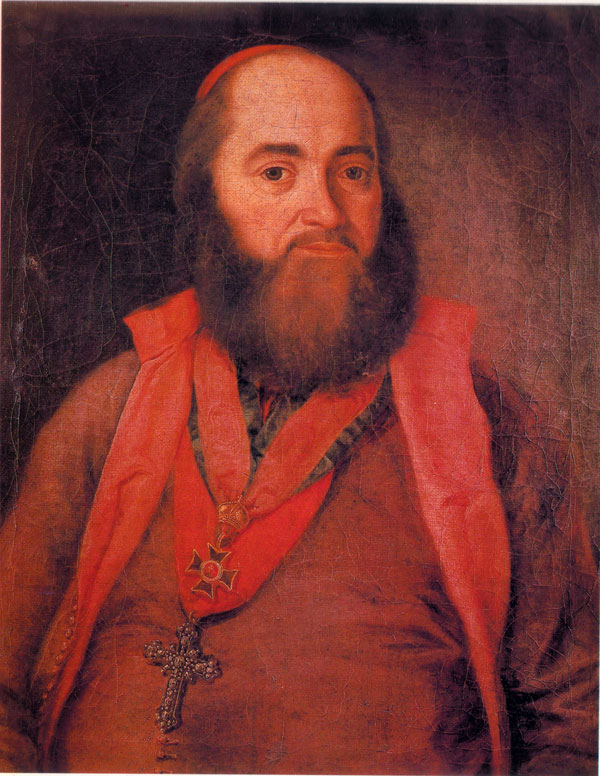
- Mojsije Putnik (1782) by Stefan Gavrilović
- Born: Vasilije Putnik; 1728; Novi Sad, Kingdom of Hungary, Habsburg monarchy (present-day Serbia)
- Died: 1790 (aged 61–62)
- Occupations: the Metropolitan of Sremski Karlovci between 1781 and 1790
- Known for: Religious tolerance

Mojsije Putnik (Serbian Cyrillic: Мојсије Путник, pronounced [mǒːjsije pûtniːk]) (1728–1790) was the Metropolitan of Sremski Karlovci between 1781 and 1790, during the reign of Joseph II. He was known for publishing the Toleranzpatent (tolerance patent) meant to ensure equal rights for the Serbian Orthodox Church and the Catholic church in Sremski Karlovci.

== Biography ==
Vasilije Putnik was born in 1728, in Novi Sad, at the time part of Kingdom of Hungary in the Habsburg monarchy (modern Serbia). He was the grandson of Stevan Putnik, a captain of the Military Frontier who served in the Imperial Guard Cavalry and achieved minor nobility status which was conferred to him in 1621 by Ferdinand II, Holy Roman Emperor. Stefan died in 1622 in the Thirty Years' War, but his male heir attained the honour of knighthood.. Coming from such an illustrious background meant that Vasilije Putnik received a thorough education that commenced in the primary and later Latin School in Novi Sad, the same school where Zaharije Orfelin taught two decades later.

Vasilije Putnik went to the Lycée of Novi Sad as a student of theology and philosophy, and soon thereafter he decided to take orders at the age of seventeen. Vasilije took the monastic name of Mojsije (Moses) and began his clerical career. He was soon noticed by Arsenije IV Jovanović Šakabenta and was made a deacon. In the next few years he was elevated to the position of Archimandrite. Putnik was then entrusted to an important diplomatic mission to suppress the Uniates (Eastern Catholic Churches) who were propagating their confession in one of the Orthodox dioceses. His mission was a success, as the correspondence kept in the Archiepiscopal Archives confirms, and he managed to persuade the local congregation that was forced to accept the Uniate Church to return to the Eastern Orthodox Church.

With all this in mind, Metropolitan Pavle Nenadović (1699–1768) proposed Putnik as the chief candidate for the Bishopric of Bačka, Szeged, and Eger. After a year of negotiations, Putnik was installed in Novi Sad on the sixth of June 1757. He was then, at the age of 29, the youngest ever Orthodox cleric to be raised to the episcopate. He was responsible for inviting Jovan Rajić to Novi Sad as well as other Serbian and Russian scholars.

Mojsije Putnik remained in that position for eighteen years, and during that period he took particular care to improve the educational system of his diocese, which culminated in the foundation of its first seminary. His care for his faithful surpassed the usual efforts of Orthodox clergymen, which made his contemporaries write of him in terms of ideal bishop, vescovo ideale. During floods that gravely endangered Novi Sad in 1769 and 1770, members of his staff were seen dutifully helping people and saving lives. During those months Putnik regularly assisted the citizens of both Novi Sad and Petrovaradin with clothes, food and shelter.

His congregation desired to have him elected archbishop immediately after Metropolitan Pavle's death, but numerous intrigues developed during the sabors (assemblies) of 1769 and 1774 which prevented Putnik from taking the high office. After these, he was, at his own request, transferred to the post of Bishop of Banat. His congregation from Novi Sad was so desolate that on the day of his departure a large number of citizens, dressed in their finest clothes, "and driving their finest carriages and carts went to bid him farewell. They followed him as far as Bečej where they parted from him and kissed his hand and the hem of his robes."

While living in Timișoara, Putnik became the first Orthodox bishop to whom Empress Maria Theresa (1717–1780) granted the prestigious title of Privy Councillor—an honour up to then reserved only for the highest prelates, and patriarchs of the Orthodox Church in the Empire. He stayed in the diocese of Banat until 1782, when he was at last unanimously elected the Metropolitan of Sremski Karlovci. In 1783 Putnik was given further dioceses of Bukovina and Erdelj (not formerly under the protection of Metropolitanate of Karlovci). On the thirteenth of October 1784, Mojsije Putnik and three bishops in Sremski Karlovci ordained Bishop Petar I Petrovic-Njegos of Montenegro, the uncle of the great poet Njegos.

Customarily, all Serb hierarchs in Montenegro went to the Serbian Patriarchate of Peć for their ordination, however, in 1766 all that changed. The Patriarch Vasilije Ivanović-Brkić whom the Turks exiled, and placed a Phanariot Greek, Kalinik II, at the head of the Serbian Orthodox Church, who went on to abolish the Patriarchate of Peć altogether. After that it became necessary for the archimandrites of Montenegro to seek to be ordained bishops far from their mountain fastness in Sremski Karlovci (in the case of Petar I Petrović-Njegoš) and Imperial Russia (in the case of Petar II Petrović Njegoš).

Mojsije continued his educational policies, and founded the first secondary school in the Military Frontier, better known as the Vojna Krajina, after a permission was received directly from Joseph II, Holy Roman Emperor, in 1782. During the 1770s, Putnik was decorated by Empress Maria Theresa; and having received the Commander's cross with the image of Saint Stephen (the patron saint of Hungary) he was an enthusiastic partisan of Joseph II during his struggle with parliament. On 1 June 1784 Mojsije Putnik elevated a distinguished Serbian Orthodox monk and writer, Kiril Zhivkovich, to the rank of archimandrite before he was ordained Bishop of Pakrac two years later, on 20 June 1786.

In 1787 Emperor Joseph II decided to launch a war against the Ottoman Empire. The Turks immediately took the military initiative, driving back the Austrians from Mehadia and overrunning the Banat (1789). The Austrians soon organized units of Serbian Freikorps who fought valiantly, deep inside the Turkish-controlled country, under Koča Andjelković, and were able to establish Koča's frontier for a time. Many Serbs were present at the Siege of Belgrade (1789), led by General Ernst Gideon von Laudon, and participated in all of the actions against the Turks. While elsewhere the combined armies of Austria and Russia were carrying city after city, Joseph II died.

In May 1790 Mojsije Putnik went to Vienna with the bishops of Temișoara, Vršac, and Bačka to pay respects to the newly enthroned Leopold II, Holy Roman Emperor (1747–1792). But the idea of distinct political nationhood among the Serbs living in Hungarian-occupied territories began to reveal itself. The years of cooperation with Austrian authorities proved a great disappointment. Sensing the current of the time, Putnik decided that a separate convention from the usual Ecclesiastical Sabor (Assembly) be convened. He decided that it was now an appropriate time to establish "a People's Congress" for the Serbs and Vlahs of Temišvar (Timișoara) in particular and the Banat region in general. Unfortunately, Mojsije Putnik died at Vienna in June 1790 before the sabor met on the 21 August of the same year.

The Temišvar Serb and Vlah Congress of 1790, to which the Serb parish priests, smallholders, burghers, high clergy and military leaders received an invitation, regarded ad hoc privileged positions as final. Albeit the Turkish occupation ended. On the basis of the existing situation, Frontier General Arsenije Secujac, backed by Serb military and the high clergy, demanded the establishment of a Serb-Illyrian chancellery. Sava Tekelija, a politician and a leader of the Serbs, was opposed to the military demands, advocated a peaceful compromise with the Hungarian authorities in the spirit of constitutionality. (The Vienna Royal Court, following its self-serving divisive policy towards the nationalities of the Danube region, found the creation of the Illyrian chancellery practicable for the time being).

Undoubtedly, the list of his books supplies the most valuable information. In Putnik's library, theological literature abound, particularly Russian ecclesiastical works, and he owned a large number of liturgical titles (books of psalms in several edition, catechisms, prayer books and books of hours). He also owned famous works such as "the Spiritual Alphabet" and The Rock of Faith by Russian theologian Stefan Yavorsky, the representative of the scholastic theology of the National University of Kyiv-Mohyla Academy, and the popular "Spiritual Regulations" of Peter the Great (written by Feofan Prokopovich), the work widely copied in the ecclesiastical reforms in the archbishopric. Putnik was also versed in the works by universal authors that had a great influence in both the Eastern and Western Roman Empires, most notably "Meditations" by our St. Augustine and "Annales ecclesiastici" (Ecclesiastical Annals) by Caesar Baronius (1538–1607) in the Russian edition of Piotr Skarga. Putnik was also interested in Erasmus of Rotterdam and philosophical works by the German Jewish philosopher Moses Mendelssohn (1729–1786).

== See also ==
- Dimitrie Eustatievici
- Simeon Končarević
- Zaharije Orfelin
- Jovan Rajić
- Visarion Pavlović
- Emanuel Kozačinski

== Sources ==
- Đorđević, Miloš Z. (2010). "A Background to Serbian Culture and Education in the First Half of the 18th Century according to Serbian Historiographical Sources". Empires and Peninsulas: Southeastern Europe between Karlowitz and the Peace of Adrianople, 1699–1829. Berlin: LIT Verlag. pp. 125–131. ISBN 9783643106117.
- Пузовић, Предраг (2014). "Рад митрополита Павла Ненадовића на просвећивању свештенства и народа (Work of the Metropolitan Pavle Nenadović on the education of priesthood and common people)". Три века Карловачке митрополије 1713-2013 (PDF). Сремски Карловци-Нови Сад: Епархија сремска, Филозофски факултет. pp. 166–177.
- Jovan Skerlić, Istrorija nove srpske književnosti / History of Modern Serbian Literature (Belgrade, 1921), pages 60–66
- Todorović, Jelena (2006). An Orthodox Festival Book in the Habsburg Empire: Zaharija Orfelin's Festive Greeting to Mojsej Putnik (1757). Aldershot: Ashgate Publishing. ISBN 9780754656111.
- Вуковић, Сава (1996). Српски јерарси од деветог до двадесетог века (Serbian Hierarchs from the 9th to the 20th Century). Београд: Евро.

Preceded by Visarion Pavlović	Bishop of Bačka; 1757–1774	Succeeded by Arsenije Radivojević
Preceded by Vićentije Jovanović Vidak	Bishop of Temišvar; 1774–1781	Succeeded by Sofronije Kirilović
Preceded by Vićentije Jovanović	Metropolitan of Karlovci; 1781–1790	Succeeded by Stefan Stratimirović
