= Aleksije Vezilić =

Serbian writer

Aleksije Vezilić Алексије Везилић
- Born: 17 March 1753; Stari Ker (now Zmajevo), Habsburg monarchy (Modern-day Serbia)
- Died: 12 January 1792 (aged 38); Novi Sad, Habsburg monarchy (Modern-day Serbia)
- Occupations: Writer, poet
- Writing career
- Language: Serbian

Aleksije Vezilić (Serbian: Алексије Везилић; 17 March 1753, in Stari Ker, now Zmajevo – 12 January 1792, in Novi Sad) was a Serbian lyric poet who introduced the German version of the Enlightenment to the Serbs.

== Biography ==
Vezilić was born in a Serbian village called Stari Ker, today's Zmajevo, situated in the Vrbas municipality, in the South Bačka District, Vojvodina province, then part of the Austrian Military Frontier, on 17 July 1753. He completed his early schooling in Novi Sad and Segedin, and studied Latin and German at the universities of Buda and Pest. Upon graduation in 1780, he went to Vienna and enrolled in the newly established École Normale (which in time became the College of Pedagogy of the University of Vienna), then under the guidance of professor Stevan Vujanovski. Founded in Vienna, the École Normale trained teachers and supervisors of all the reformed schools. In 1782 he became a professor at a teacher's college in Karlovci. In 1785 he entered the University of Vienna to read law, and two years later, he taught Latin and German in Karlovci. In 1790 he was offered the post of regent of Serbian and Romanian Orthodox schools in what was then called the Velikovardar and Eger districts in Hungary.

He was for the better part of his life ostensibly headed for the Church, but not until 1790. After a brief period of study, he was ordained that year at Rakovac monastery in Fruska Gora. Two years later he died on 12 January 1792 at Novi Sad. He was 39.

How seriously he took himself as a poet is clear from the classical form in which he began his career. He produced in turn a book -- Kratkoje socinenije o privatnih i publicnih delah (1775) -- containing four odes, while another of his works -- Kratkoje napisenije o spokojnoj zizni (1788) -- represented the first collection of verses in modern Serbian literature. Also, he wrote a Serbian-German Dictionary entitled Rečnik malyj nemecko-serbsij, published posthumously in Vienna in 1793.

== His legacy ==
As an intellectual, Vezilić condemned magic and superstition. He belongs to the race of poetical reformers who appeared in all countries of Europe at the end of the eighteenth century; but it is interesting to observe that in point of time he preceded all of them. He was born four years earlier than Rigas Feraios, six years before Friedrich Schiller, nine years before André Chénier, and seventeen and nineteen years earlier than William Wordsworth and Samuel Taylor Coleridge respectively, but he did for Serbia what each of these poets did for his own country. Vezilić found Serbian literature given to too much religiosity, rhetoric and with little art and vigor. He was the first to introduce classicism, vivacity of style, freshness and brevity of form, and an imaginative study of nature which was then unprecedented. But perhaps his greatest claim to notice is the fact that he was among the earliest intellectuals (Pavle Julinac, Jovan Rajić, Zaharije Orfelin, Dositej Obradović, Jovan Muškatirović) to call the attention of his people to the treasuries of their rich, ancient history and mythology, and to suggest the use of these in imaginative writing. Vezilić was the founder of classicism in Serbian literature, but it was the work of Lukijan Mušicki which, according to Jovan Skerlić, brought it to its apogee.

The Serbian-Russian general Semyon Zorich was also remembered in a special way, in poems published in Vienna and Buda, by Aleksije Vezilić.
