= Stefan Vujanovski =

Serbian education reformer and author

Stefan Vujanovski (1743 – 19 January 1829) was a Serbian education reformer and author of several textbooks. He was one of the most learned men of his time and a collaborator with other Serbian education reformers such as Teodor Janković-Mirijevski, Avram Mrazović, Vasilije Damjanović, Uroš Nestorović and others.

== Biography ==
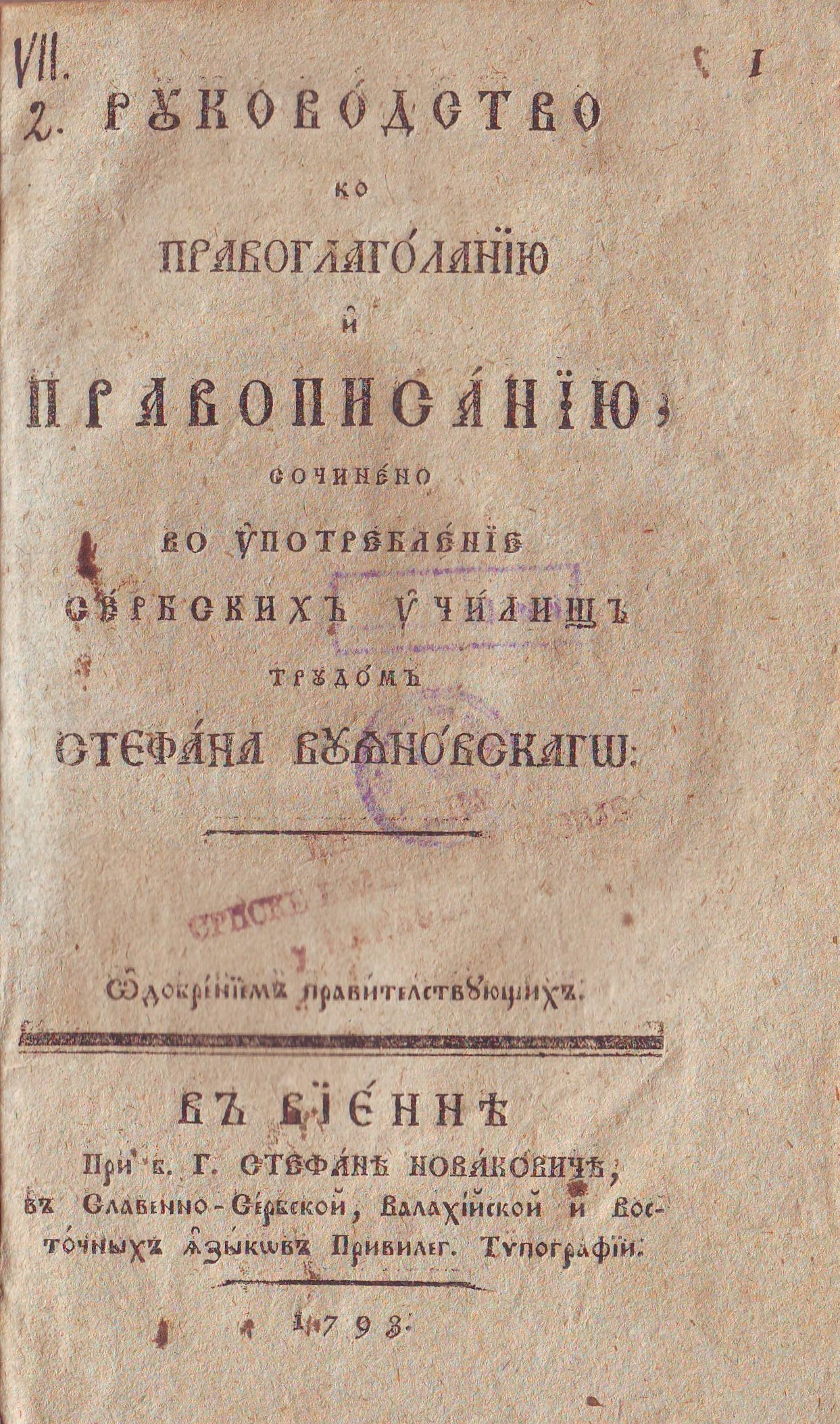
Cover of textbook Rukovodstvo k pravoglagolaniju i pravopisaniju (Serbian grammar published in 1793)

He was born in Brđani, Požega-Slavonia County, Habsburg monarchy. Vujanovski learned the elements of the sciences and in particular, the Latin language in Sremski Karlovci under the tutelage of Jovan Rajić, and then turned to the teaching profession. Soon, however, he gave up the teaching post which he held in Vukovar to fulfill his desire for scientific training in education. For this purpose, he studied at the Protestant Evangelical Lyceum in Pozun (Bratislava), philosophy at the University of Sopron, then jurisprudence at the University of Vienna. At this time he met Metropolitan Vićentije Jovanović Vidak who eventually became his patron. After graduating, he undertook a journey on his own account to do research on the educational system in Germany, Poland and Russia.

Both Stefan von Novaković and Josef von Kurzböck employed Serbian typesetters and proofreaders, mainly young, educated men who came to study in Vienna and who were proficient in Slavonic-Serbian. Among them were Gligorije Trlajić and Stefan Vujanovski who, after the death of Prince Dmitry Mikhailovich Golitsyn the Younger in Russia, returned to Vienna to find employment at the Serbian/Cyrillic court printing press. Later, he was appointed in 1777 as the Royal Director of the Greek-Oriental Normal Schools in the Zagreb school district to head the founding of Serbian school in Srem and Slavonia. Joseph II, Holy Roman Emperor himself showed interest in its founding and progress. In appreciation for Vujanovski's meritorious activity as an education reformer and administrator he was ennobled in 1792. He also acted as a court panel assessor of several counties. At Novi Sad, where he retired with a pension, he died at quite advanced years.

== Works ==
He wrote a manual on the German language for his compatriots: Niemeckaja grammatica; wrote a grammar of Old Church Slavonic, but the manuscript of this work, which came into the possession of Bishop Lukijan Mušicki, was not published. He also translated from Russian a short church history: Kratkaja cerkovnaja istoria; and a handbook of arithmetic, which was reprinted often. Vujanovski used Meletius Smotrytsky's popular work as a source for the compilation of the grammar he wrote for Serbian schools.

Pavel Jozef Šafařík had nothing but praise for Vujanovski when he described him as a knowledgeable, open-minded, competent and enthusiastic man for the education and common good of his peers to the end.

== See also ==
- Avram Mrazović
- Teodor Janković Mirijevski
- Uroš Nestorović
- Dimitrie Eustatievici
