= Nikola Šimić =

Nikola Šimić also spelled Nikola Shimich (Serbian: Никола Шимић; 1766 in Sombor, Habsburg monarchy – 5 January 1848 in Sombor, Austrian Empire) is credited for being the author of the first modern book on logic in the Serbian language, published in Budapest in two volumes, Volume I in 1808 and Volume II in 1809. His second work, Nacin pristojno salitisja (Die Art ariig zu scherzen) (The Art of Decent Joking), was published in 1814, also in Budapest.

Nikola Šimić was a polyglot who studied the works of Christian Wolff and Friedrich Christian Baumeister.

Avram Mrazović, a friend of Nikola Šimić, wrote the second book on logic in Serbian in a similar manner, entitled "Logic, or Reasoning," completed in 1826, the year Mrazović died. The book was not published.
