= Brđani, Požega-Slavonia County =

Brđani
- Village
- Location within Croatia
- Coordinates: 45°15′20″N 17°52′45″E
- Country: Croatia
- Region: Slavonia
- County: Požega-Slavonia County
- Town: Pleternica

Area
  - Total: 1.8 km^{2} (0.69 sq mi)
- Elevation: 218 m (715 ft)

Population (2021)
  - Total: 32
  - Density: 18/km^{2} (46/sq mi)
- Time zone: UTC+1 (CET)
  - Summer (DST): UTC+2 (CEST)
- Postal code: 34310
- Area code: 034

Brđani is a village in Požega-Slavonia County, Croatia. The village is administered as a part of the City of Pleternica.

According to national census of 2011, population of the village is 49.

== Notable people ==
- Stefan Vujanovski
