= Uroš Nestorović =

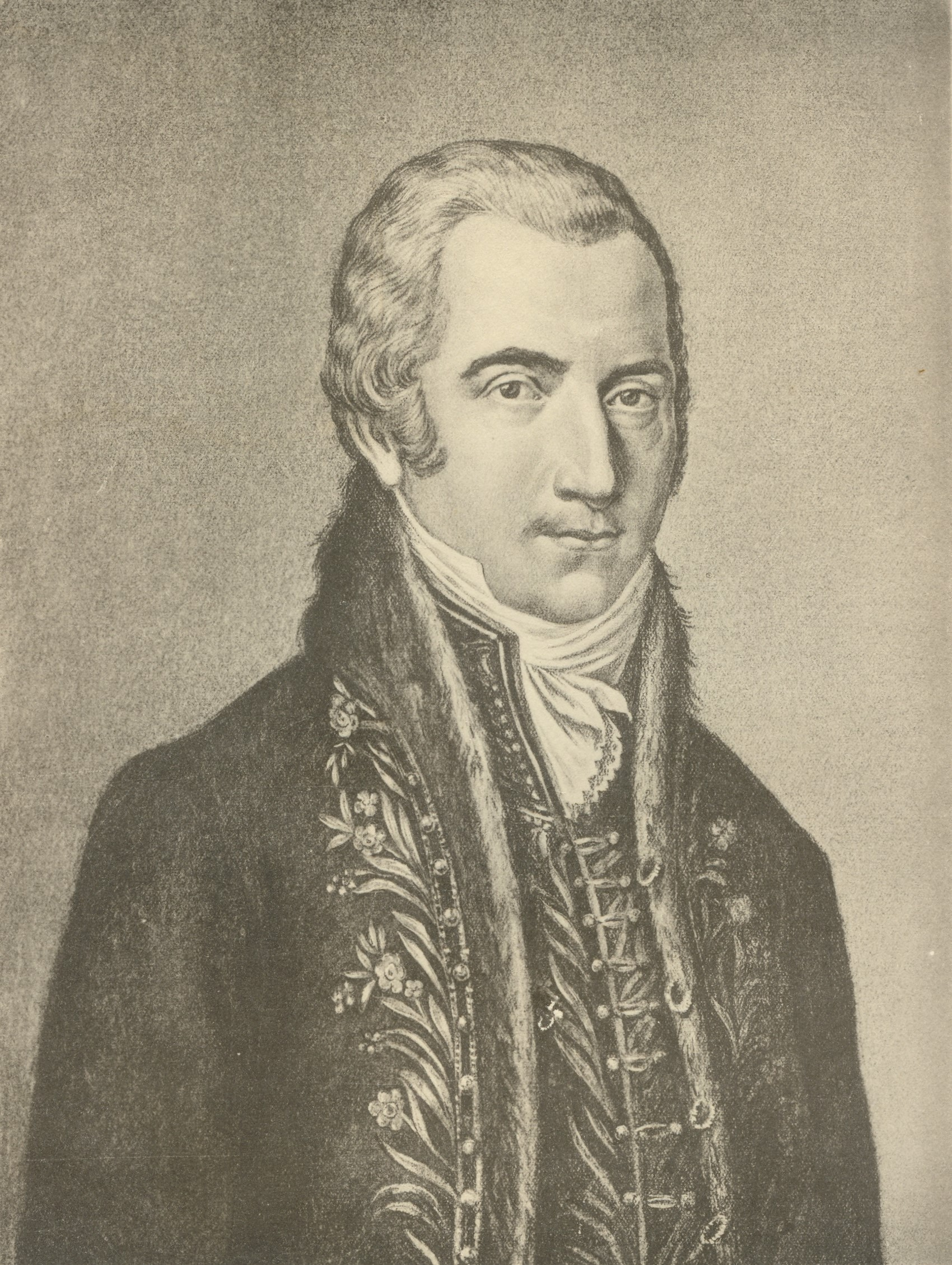
Uroš Nestorović

Uroš Stefanović Nestorović also known as Uroš Stefan Nestorović (Buda, Habsburg monarchy, 27 December 1765 – Pest, Austrian Empire, 8 August 1825) was a writer, jurist, philosopher, and pedagogue who headed all Eastern Orthodox schools in the Habsburg Monarchy. Uroš Nestorović is considered one of the most prominent Serbian enlighteners and educators along with Teodor Janković Mirijevski, Stefan Vujanovski, Dimitrie Eustatievici and Avram Mrazović.

== Biography ==
Uroš Nestorović was a well-educated polyglot Serb who graduated from a gymnasium in Pest, and earned his degrees in philosophy and law at the University of Wrocław and University of Vienna respectively.

In 1810, he was appointed by the authorities in Vienna to the post of supreme school supervisor over all non-Uniate, Eastern Orthodox adherents, including Serbian, Romanian, and Greek schools in the Habsburg monarchy. His task, upon the inspection of these schools in the Provincial and Military Frontier, which were in poor condition, was to organize these schools in a new manner, according to the latest standards, laws, and acts of the empire. Nestorović had to find a way to get the money to repair the old, existing facilities and build new schools, to pay the teachers, and to establish seminaries and colleges of higher education for training teachers and future priests. He managed to establish several funds that functioned in a satisfactory way while still being able to control these funds. The Serbian Orthodox Church offered substantial help in collecting money, but there was a conflict between Nestorović and the Archbishop Stefan Stratimirović, the head of the church. The gathered means would have been by far greater had there been more understanding and cooperation between Nestorović and Stratimirović who had the backing of the people, owing to his lofty post. Nestorović was the initiator and founder of the Serbian grammar school in Novi Sad, and the first Serbian teachers' college in Szentendre while Archbishop Platon Atanacković was the catechist at the teachers' college and the last Serbian Orthodox Bishop of Budapest.

Poet Eustahija Arsić in a book of poems entitled Sovet' Meterni (A Mother's Advice) is dedicated in fulsome terms to Uroš Nestorović, royal counselor and inspector of schools, praising his work in education and stressing the teaching of girls as well as boys.

== Works ==
He wrote several lectures and textbooks, though one, in particular, stands out: Zitije Jisusa Hrista (The Life of Jesus Christ), a textbook for schoolchildren, published in Pest in 1812.

== See also ==
- Dositej Obradović
