= Eustahija Arsić =

Serbian writer (1776–1843)

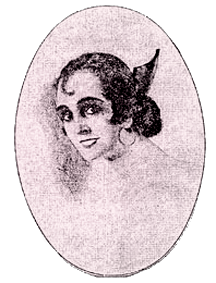

Eustahija Arsić (Serbian Cyrillic: Еустахија Арсић; 14 March 1776 – 17 February 1843) was a Serb writer, translator, and salonist in the Austrian Empire. She was the first female member of Matica srpska and contributor to its periodical Letopis. She also promoted the works of Serbian and Romanian writers, including Dositej Obradović, Joakim Vujić and Vuk Karadžić.

== Biography ==
Eustahija Arsić was born in 1776 to the Serbian Cincić family in Irig, then part of the Kingdom of Slavonia of the Habsburg monarchy. She had an excellent education and learned to speak several languages, Hungarian, German, Romanian, Church Slavonic, Italian, Latin, and some English.

Her personal life was an unhappy one, being married and widowed three times. As a young woman, she was married to Mr. Lacković, a merchant in Koprivnica, Croatia. Her second husband was Toma Radovanović, a wealthy Serbian merchant in Karlovac (Croatia) who bought his title of nobility from the Viennese court. In the first years of the 19th century, she married her third husband, nobleman Sava Arsić who was a longtime senator and mayor of Arad, great benefactor of Arad's school for teachers, and a patron of Serbian writers of that time. It was after their marriage that Eustahija began her literary work.

She was an important patron of the literary efforts of her contemporaries and was probably better known in her lifetime for this activity than for her own writings. One of the most popular places for the exchange of ideas was the salon in those days. Eustathija Arsić's home in Arad had a reading room, often galvanized by the presence of political and other émigré Serbs, including Dositej Obradović. She was highly regarded by dramatist Joakim Vujić (1772–1847), who called her "ma seule protectrice" (my sole supporter). Vuk Karadžić sought her favours in promoting his books, and many other Serbian and Romanian authors did the same. Evstahija Arsić's sparse writings has been highly praised. Much of it deals with moral teachings, short pieces of advice, and philosophical reflections.

In his book "Traveling through Serbia in the Year 1829" (Reise in Serbien im Spatherbst 1829; 2 vols., Berlin, 1830), Otto Ferdinand Dubislav von Pirch (1799–1832) mentions that Arsić has translated works by Voltaire, Wieland and James Thomas.

She died in Arad.

== Style and themes ==
Her works, published somewhat anachronistically, in 1814, 1816, and 1829, are entirely in keeping with the spirit of the Enlightenment. She refers frequently to the example of Dositej (Obradović), her model of a committed instructor of his people.

Her writings are serious and direct. They suggest a deep commitment at a time when it was quite unknown for a Serbian woman to be engaged in any kind of literary activity, let alone the promotion of other authors' works, while at the same time, producing her own opus.

== See also ==
- Ana Marija Marović
- Staka Skenderova
- Princess Anka Obrenović
- Milica Stojadinović-Srpkinja
- Draga Dejanović

== Bibliography ==
- Sovet' Maternii (A Mother's Advice, Buda, 1814), dedicated to Uroš Stefan Nestorović, royal counselor and inspector of Serbian and Romanian schools in the Habsburg Monarchy.
- Poleznaya Razmislyenye o chetirih Godishnih' Vremeneh (Useful Reflections on the Four Seasons), some 160 pages of verse and prose pieces of varying lengths, including some quite substantial, intricate and thought-provoking passages.
