= Teodor Janković-Mirijevski =

Serbian academic, and writer

Teodor Janković-Mirijevski de Mirievo
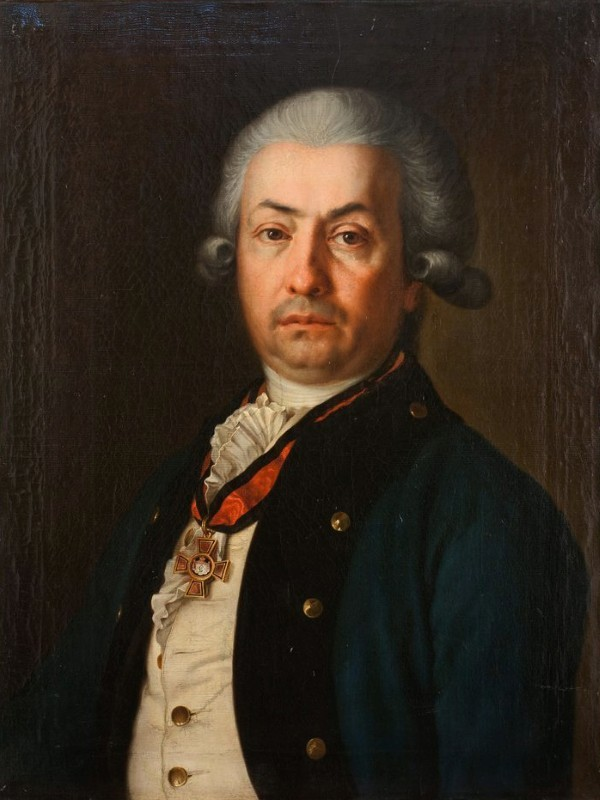
- Born: 17 April 1741; Sremska Kamenica, Austrian Empire
- Died: 22 May 1814 (aged 73); Saint Petersburg, Russian Empire
- Education: University of Vienna
- Occupations: Academic, professor, writer
- Writing career
- Notable works: Comparative Dictionary of All Languages and Dialects, Universal Geography, Reduced Russian Geography

Teodor Janković Mirijevski (also written F. I. Mirievskii, Fedor Ivanovich Yankovich de Mirievo; Sremska Kamenica, 17 April 1741 – Saint Petersburg, 22 May 1814) was a Serbian and Russian educational reformer, academic, scholar and pedagogical writer. For his accomplishments in educational reforms he was twice ennobled, by Maria Theresa in 1774 and by Catherine the Great in 1791. Among the great 18th century education reformers of Europe and Russia, Teodor Janković stands alone in that limelight. He became a member of the Russian Academy in 1783. He also held the rank of Brigadier in the Imperial Russian Army.

His son Ivan Yankovich de Mirievo held the rank of Lieutenant General in the Imperial Russian Army.

== Biography ==
Teodor was the son of Jovan (Ivan) Janković, a high-ranking Serb military officer in the service of the Austrian crown. His ancestors had been living in their country estate in the Banat since the 15th century when they chose to leave Mirijevo, near Belgrade, with the encroachment of the Ottoman forces. Born in Sremska Kamenica, Janković received his early education at the Gymnasium of his native town, then he went to the Slavo-Latin school in Karlovci (Karlowitz), and then studied law, science, philosophy, and political science at the University of Vienna. As a cameralism student his professor was Johann von Sonnenfels. After entering the University of Vienna, he began to read widely in the fields of general knowledge, mathematics, and science.

After reading the manuals of Hecker and Zwecke, Janković decided to visit Johann Julius Hecker. In his travels, Janković journeyed to Berlin to see if the manuals work. It was not highly irregular for an Orthodox layman to visit a Protestant school in Protestant Berlin. There he spent the next month visiting Hecker, observing classes and studying Pietist educational writings. Since parish education was his main concern, Janković spent most of his time in Hecker's school for the poor. It was there that he saw pupils divided according to ability and receiving instruction collectively. He decided there and then against corporal punishment if one wanted to instill a love of learning in the child. He opted to talk and discuss with the pupil to prove that abiding discipline can resolve ignorance. Janković was particularly impressed by the discipline and order he found and also the tabular-literal method by Johann Friedrich Hahn (1710-1789), the mnemonic device that organized each lesson into outline form. He insisted that there be no gender differences in the school system.

Janković soon realized that if he was to reform his parish schools in the Banat, he would need a core of trained teachers. Upon returning to the Banat in 1772, Janković dispatched to Temesvar two young acquaintances, Avram Mrazović and Stefan Vujanovski, who were to spend a year in Vienna at the Normal school and teaching institute. Still fearing of arousing Catholic distrust, Janković kept their journey secret. He had deliberately chosen Mrazović and Vujanovski, neither of whom lived in the Banat so that no one in the town would learn of his Berlin connections. When Mrazović and Vujanovski returned to the Banat in 1773, Janković apprenticed them as schoolmasters in a local parish to observe whether they had mastered the essentials of Hecker's pedagogy. Fully satisfied with their performance, soon Janković would begin reforming the parish schools under his jurisdiction.

After being appointed a director of public school in Timis Province in the Banat, an area inhabited by Serbs and Romanians, Bishop Vićentije Jovanović Vidak of Temesvar made Janković his private secretary in 1773. When Bishop Vicentije was elevated to Metropolitan of Karlovci in 1774, Janković was appointed a secretary to the new bishop, Peter Petrović of Temesvar. Janković headed the implementation in Timis Province of the Austrian school edict of 1774 as applied to the traditions of the Orthodox population, both Serb and Romanian. When the Metropolitan Vićentije died in February 1780, Janković received the leading candidate to succeed him, Metropolitan Mojsije Putnik. In effect, the administration of the Metropolitanate of Karlovci lay in the hands of Janković. He also prepared special pedagogical handbooks for teachers. He used his position to contest against the latinization of the Serbian Cyrillic script before the Hungarian Court Chancellery. Vidak's successor, Mojsije Putnik proved to be a broad-minded cleric who understood and supported Janković's aim to educate everyone. As secretary, Janković devoted much of his time to his scientific interests. Although science was little more than a hobby for Janković, he subsequently acquired a modest scientific reputation for his treatises in specialized textbooks and manuals. The breath of Janković's scientific interests is seen in his correspondence with Franz Aepinus, a German and Russian natural philosopher. Aepinus is best known for his researches in electricity and magnetism.

== Obstacles to reforms ==
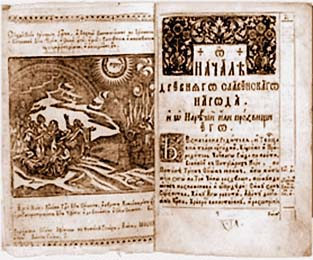
A book in Russian by Janković-Mirijevski

In the Habsburg Empire, there was resistance to compulsory education at first. The salary of the teachers remained the responsibility of the parish community and although the free distribution of textbooks reduced somewhat the financial burden, school fees remained a source of hardship for poorer families. Families, in general, were less inclined to send their daughters to a school than their sons, although the General School Ordinance applied equally to both sexes. Religion pluralism posed problems in the Banat of the eighteenth century, particularly in education. The Orthodox religion had employed statutory autonomy since the late seventeenth century, when Leopold I, Holy Roman Emperor granted ecclesiastical self-government in exchange for military assistance against the Turks. Both lay and clerical education of the Orthodox population was in the hands of the Metropolitanate of Karlovci (Karlowitz), Vićentije Jovanović Vidak. Hence the success of Theresian reform in the Banat hinged upon the ability of Vienna to reach a 'modus vivendi' with the Orthodox hierarchy. That such a compromise was achieved was largely the work of Teodor Janković who had close ties with both the absolutist reformers and the Orthodox clergy. Janković had not only studied under cameralist Joseph von Sonnenfels at Vienna and attended the Normal School and teaching institute but also served under Peter Petrović, who became the Orthodox bishop of Temesvar, before being appointed as director of the Banat School Commission in 1773. A striking example of successful translation policy was the Banat, where Janković translated and adapted many of Johann Ignaz von Felbiger's works into Serbian and Romanian, not to mention the teaching of past reformers such as Wolfgang Ratke, John Amos Comenius and Jean Jacques Rousseau. Janković was thereby able to win the trust of both the Austrian court and of the Orthodox metropolitans Vićentije Jovanović Vidak and later Mojsije Putnik and his clergy. He was ennobled by Maria Theresa in 1774 for his contributions to educational reform and management in Austria.

The school ordinance for the Banat (1776) reflected the resulting compromise. School instruction was to be in Serbian or Romanian, although higher salaries were offered to those schoolmasters capable of providing German instruction. Supervision of the schools was to be divided between the state (the Banat School Commission in Temesvar) and the Orthodox clergy. The state and the Serbian Orthodox Church also shared financial responsibility for the building and maintenance of the schools. The Court Treasury in Vienna subsidized the training of seventeen Serbian schoolmasters at the Vienna Normal School and established three-month seminars in Sombor and Osijek where Orthodox schoolmasters were instructed in the fundamentals of the Sagan method, preferred by Johann Felbiger. Janković sent Stevan Vujanovski to Osijek in 1778 to oversee the preliminary training of elementary teachers at state-run, special schools called Praparanden-Anstalten. School districts were also formed. Three such districts for Serb schools were headed by prominent pedagogues and writers of the time: in Banat, Teodor Janković Mirievski; Avram Mrazović in Bačka and Baranja; and Stevan Vujanovski in Slavonia, Srem and Croatia. After Mirijevski, the supreme superintendent of Serbian and Romanian schools in the empire was Uroš Nestorović (1765-1825) who initiated and founded the first Serbian teacher's college. Grigorije Obradović, the nephew of Dositej Obradović, was one of the principal educators at the time.

The Metropolitanate in Karlovci, for its part, also contributed funds for the training of schoolmasters and the distribution of catechism.

The result was a considerable expansion of primary schooling in Banat. When Janković left the Habsburg Empire for Imperial Russia the number of Orthodox schools in the Banat had doubled to 500 in 1782. The Hungarian Court Chancellery, which took over administration of the Banat in 1778, estimated in 1780 that most Serbian villages and more than half of the Romanian villages had Orthodox elementary schools. The higher concentration of schools among the Serbs reflected the fact that the Serbian population tended to be concentrated in the southern and central Banat, a region of market towns and agrarian villages. In the eastern Banat, where most Romanians lived, a more rural, pastoral economy prevailed.

Heavily influenced by the Rousseauean pedagogy of Johann Bernard Basedow, Janković was critical of Johann Ignaz von Felbiger continued emphasis upon memorization. Janković was an advocate of the Socratic method, in which instruction took the form of a conversation between teacher and pupil. Memorization was important but to a certain point. During his career, Janković was formulating a general theory of education. In this respect, he is the forerunner of Heinrich Julius Bruns (1746-1794), Joseph Anton Gall (1748-1807), Johann Heinrich Pestalozzi, Adolph Diesterweg, Friedrich Fröbel and others, and was the first to formulate that idea of "education according to traditions and customs" so influential in his work in the Habsburg Empire among the Serbs, Romanians, Greeks, Bulgars and in Imperial Russia among the Russians, Ukrainians, Ruthenians, Rusyns, and Belarusians. The influence of Janković on educational thought is comparable with that of his contemporaries, Emanuilo Janković, Anastasije Stojković, Franz Aepinus and Dositej Obradović, on science and philosophy. In fact, he was largely influenced by the thought of these men, if not others; and his importance is large because he first applied systematically the principles of thought and investigation, formulated by philosophers of the Era of Enlightenment to the general organization of education. Another aspect of his educational influence is the second edition of the "Comparative Dictionary of All Languages and Dialects, Arranged in Alphabetical Order," issued in 1791.

In short, Theresian school reforms had a significant impact on the educational level of the Banat. At the very least the reforms promoted the rise of the Serbian and Romanian literary vernaculars. Efforts to diffuse the written vernacular began in 1770 when the court sanctioned the establishment of a Cyrillic press for Serbs and Romanians alike by the Viennese publishing firm of Joseph von Kuzböck. Schoolbooks were also translated for the Romanian population, which was concentrated in southeastern Banat. It is no accident in this regard that the noted Serbian playwright Joakim Vujić and poet and translator Aleksije Vezilić had graduated from the schools established by the reforms in the 1770s. Similarly, four of the Romanian intellectuals—Mihai Roşu Martinovici, Dimitrie Țichindeal, Paul Iorgovici (1764-1808) and Constantin Diaconovici-Loga (1770-1850) -- even taught in them.

== Meeting with Catherine the Great ==
Although Janković had put aside his pedagogical work, for the time being, his Banat reforms had begun to attract the attention of educational reformers throughout the Slavic world. While there was no dearth of pedagogical reforms in Russia, virtually all were German or Baltic, mostly Roman Catholics and Protestants. Janković alone offered a pedagogical model to the Orthodox Slavs who, for whatsoever reason, were dissatisfied with the conditions of parish schooling in their territories. In 1782 Catherine the Great invited Janković to Imperial Russia on the recommendation of Maria Theresa's son Joseph II, Holy Roman Emperor who praised Janković for having schools built for minorities in the Habsburg domains. On 6 September 1782, Janković had his first meeting with Catherine and Ivan Betskoy, the President of the Imperial Academy of Arts, who served as her advisor on education. The next day he was made the director of Russian schools and by law a permanent member of Komissiia ob uchrezhdenii uchilisch (The Commission for the Establishment of Public Schools) founded by Catherine in 1782 to plan and supervise the development of a new system. Ten days later, Janković produced a draft plan for a public school system in Russia which was accepted by Catherine on 21 September. For the next four years, the Commission worked out ways and means to implement the proposals through the empire. In a decade of work, the Commission introduced into Russia the essentials of a modern educational system on par with Europe.

The year 1783 saw the publication of three books by the Commission which in themselves reveal Catherine's entire educational attitude. The first was a guide for teachers who were to staff the new schools, the second two were books of rules for students to follow. The teachers' manual, "Rukovodstvo uchiteliam pervago i vtorago klassa narodnykh uchilishch Rossiiskoi Imperii," was Russia's first systematic outline of pedagogical method. Janković was the author of the manual, which was based in part upon a "Felbiger Handbuch" already translated and adapted by him into Serbian and Rumanian in 1776 for use in the Austrian Empire. But the Russian guidebook also encompassed ideas held by the University of Moscow compilers of "Sposob ucheniia" (Teaching Methods, 1771). Janković's new pedagogical textbook was divided into chapters on the methodology of group lessons, reading, numbers' tablets, and questioning; ways to instruct individuals in learning their letters, writing, and arithmetic; and administrative procedures. These divisions were the same as those in the book's Austrian counterpart. But as was often the case when an idea, ideal, or system indigenous to Western Europe was adopted to Russian circumstances, the textbook took on specific Russian characteristics. In contrast to the earlier Serbian and Romanian manual, this one practically ignored religion as a subject to be taught in school, was shorter and more precise, and stressed the use of the Russian language in the classroom. The central theme of the Guide for Teachers was put succinctly enough in a forward: "The rank of teacher obligates them to try and make from their student's useful members of society, and to do what is necessary to frequently encourage youth towards the observation of their societal duties, to enlighten their minds, and to teach them to think and to act wisely, honorably and decently".

Janković later journeyed to St. Petersburg in 1782 at the behest of the empress where he helped supervise reforms in Russian primary schools. In Russia, Janković proposed changes in the system. Instead of attending schools outside the barracks the children of soldiers were now to attend special schools of their own. In addition, schooling was to be extended to soldiers themselves. Weekly visits by normal school graduates were to provide information in reading, writing, and arithmetic. Catherine the Great strongly endorsed Janković's proposal and forwarded it to the Court War Council. She ennobled him in 1791, giving him an estate in the Mogilev Oblast.

In St. Petersburg, Janković met Peter Simon Pallas who became close to Catherine the Great, for whom he helped carry out a peculiar project to try to establish the truth of the theory of a single language as the basis of all languages in the world. To this end, Pallas attempted to record different words in languages of the Russian Empire and throughout the world by sending out a survey (in the USA, George Washington instructed state governors to help the Russian Empress in her research). The result was published as a dictionary of simple terms in more than 200 languages. The second edition of this dictionary Pallas could not complete and Janković was asked to take over the task. This one contained 61,700 words in 279 different languages (171 Asian, 55 European, 30 African and 22 American languages). Although methodologically flawed, this experiment, and especially criticism of its techniques, did much to develop a basis for the study of linguistics. From 1802 to 1804, Janković was a member of the Commission for Schools of the Ministry of Public Education (known as the Central School Board from 1803).

During his stay in Russia, Teodor held the rank of Brigadier.

His son, Ivan Yankovich de Mirievo, was a soldier who attained the rank of Major General during the Napoleonic Wars. Janković returned to Saint Petersburg with a comfortable pension, where he remained until his death in 1814.

== Works ==
Together with Russian scholars and pedagogues, Jankovic wrote:

- Guide for Teachers of the First and Second Grades of Public Schools in the Russian Empire (1783)
- Primer (1782)
- Writing Samples and a Guide to Penmanship (1782)
- Rules for Pupils (1782)
- An Arithmetic Handbook (1784)
- Comparative Dictionary of All Languages and Dialects, Arranged in Alphabetical Order (Volumes 1-4, 1790-1791), considerably enlarged from an original, compiled by Peter Simon Pallas and published from 1787 to 1789

He also wrote numerous textbooks.

== See also ==
- Dositej Obradović
- Avram Mrazović
- Serbs in Russia

== Sources ==
- Rozhdestvenskii, S. V. Ocherki po istorii sistem narodnogo prosveshcheniia v Rossii v XVIII–XIX vv. St. Petersburg, 1912.
- Konstantinov, N. A., and V. Ia. Struminskii. Ocherki po istorii nachal’nogo obrazovaniia v Rossii, 2nd ed. Moscow, 1953. Pages 61–78.
- Ocherki istorii shkoly i pedagogicheskoi mysli narodov SSSR: XVIII v.-pervaia polovina XIX v., Edited by M. F. Shabaeva. Moscow, 1973. Pages 143–54
- Jovan Skerlić, Istorija nove srpske književnosti (The History of New Serbian Literature), Belgrade, 1914, p.54
