= Vićentije Jovanović Vidak =

Serbian Metropolitan

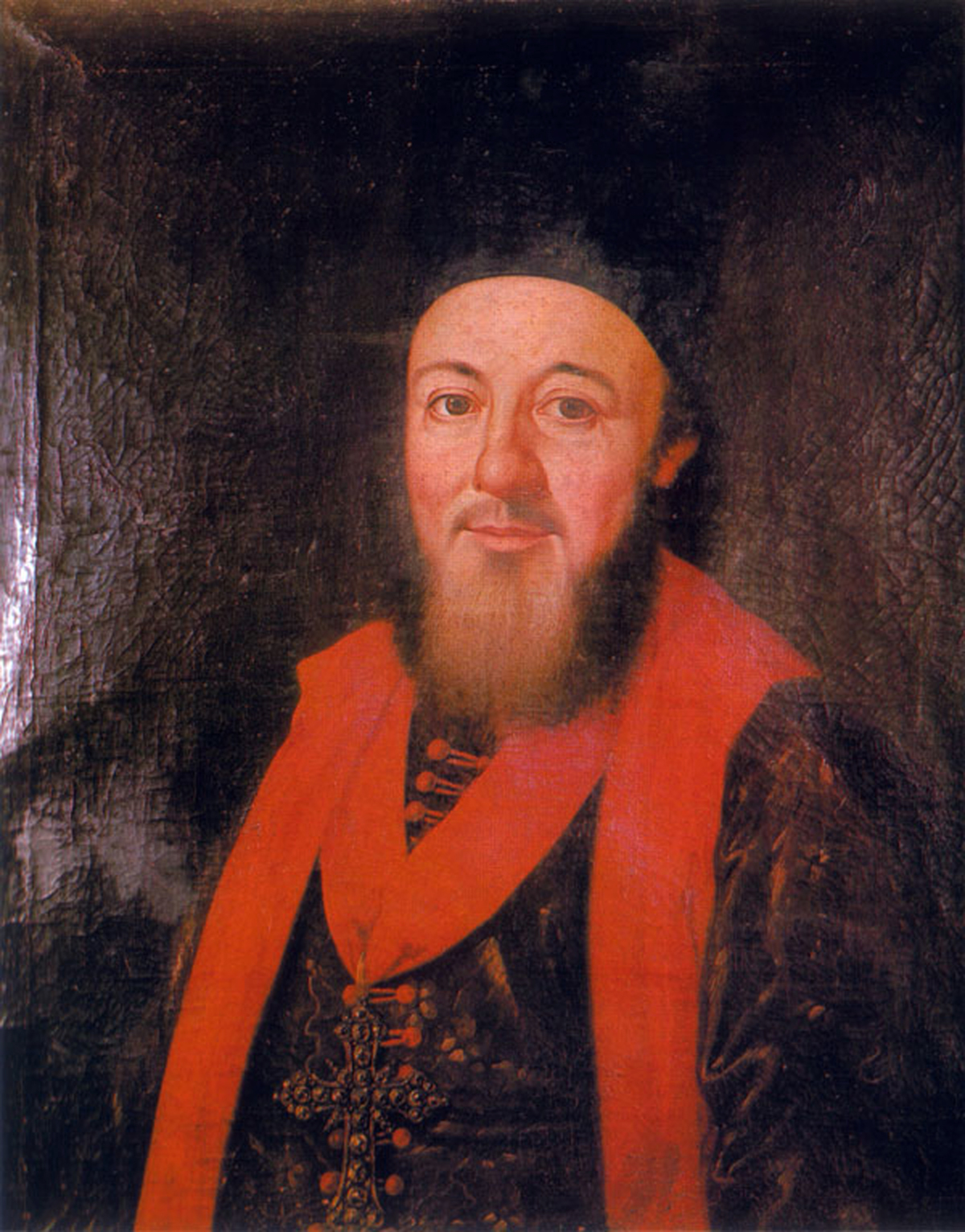
Portrait of Vićentije Jovanović Vidak

Vićentije Jovanović Vidak (Serbian Cyrillic: Вићентије Јовановић Видак; Sremski Karlovci, Habsburg monarchy, 10 March 1730 - Dalj, 18 February 1780) was the Metropolitan of the Metropolitanate of Karlovci from 1774 to 1780.

== Biography ==
He was born in Sremski Karlovci.

In 1745, he was made deacon of the Metropolitanate of Karlovci, and in 1749 he settled down in the Rakovac Monastery. After going through the hierarchal ranks, he was elected archimandrite.

In 1757, he was appointed an administrator of the Eparchy of Pakrac, and two years later he was elected as the Bishop of Temisvar. As the highest-ranking cleric, he helped Atanasije Dimitrijević Sekereš, Dositej Obradović, Teodor Janković Mirijevski, Stefan Vujanovski, Avram Mrazović and many other scholars in their educational reforms at the time.

He was elected Metropolitan in 1774 at a time when education reforms in the Habsburg State were beginning to take place. The preparation and implementation of reforms were conducted by Adam František Kollár, the president of the Illyrian Cour Deputation (Illirische Hof-Deputation) and the State censorship was in the hands of Atanasije Dimitrijević Sekereš. Therefore, the success or failure of the reforms fell on the shoulders of Metropolitan Vićentije (Jovanović Vidak).

It is noted that during his diplomatic mission in Vienna in 1776, Metropolitan Vićentije was granted permission to take all confiscated religious books brought from Russia and distribute them to the poor parishes that they were initially intended for.

Metropolitan Vićentije Jovanović Vidak died on 18 February 1780 at Dalj. He was buried there in the church of St. Dimitrije. His successor was Mojsije Putnik.

== See also ==
- Metropolitanate of Karlovci
- List of heads of the Serbian Orthodox Church
