= Dimitrie Eustatievici =

Austrian philologist, scholar and pedagogue

- Born: 1730; Grid, Fogaras County, Kingdom of Hungary
- Died: 1796 (aged 65–66)

Dimitrie Eustatievici (1730 – 1796) was an Austrian philologist, scholar and pedagogue. He was in charge of all the schools professing the Eastern Orthodox faith in the Habsburg Empire.

== Biography ==
Of Serbian origin but raised in a Romanian milieu, Eustatievici was born in the village of Grid in Fogaras County, now Romania. He was from a Serbian family that came from Old Serbia and gave to the Orthodox community of that region several priests and schoolmasters. He was a beneficiary of a sound education, first at the Romanian gymnasium in Șcheii Brașovului where his father was the archpriest of St. Nicholas Church. Eustatievici's father was able to secure a stipend for his son to study at the prestigious Kyiv Theological Academy from Serbian bishop Visarion Pavlović who readily sponsored Serbian and Romanian high school graduates wanting a teaching career. After graduation in 1753, Dimtire Eustatievici taught at his alma mater in Scheii Braşovului from 1753 until 1762.

In July 1761, Maria Theresa signed a decree appointing bishop Dionisije Novaković to his post in Transylvania; at the same time, he kept his office in Buda. In September, the new military governor, general Adolph von Buccow was present at the installation of Bishop Dionisije (Novaković) in St. Nicholas Church in Șcheii Brașovului, reading the decree in Latin, following which the bishop immediately delivered a speech in the same language. Beforehand, the priests and laymen of Șcheii, known for their attachment to Orthodoxy, obliged him to swear allegiance to the faith. The following year (1762), the empress issued a new decree of toleration, this time accompanied by eleven conditions meant to facilitate conversion to Greek Catholicism. It was at this time that Eustatievici decided to become an interpreter and secretary of bishop Dionisije Novaković, the first of three Serbian bishops (Dionisije Novaković, Ioan Popovici, and Ghedeon Niketici) at Rășinari and Sibiu.

Bishop Dionisije Novaković chose Sibiu instead of Brașov as his residence, initially renting a house for two years. During one of his absences, the building was taken over by the head of the local post office, forcing the bishop to move to a three-room peasant house in Rășinari that still stands. In 1764, upon the insistence of his priests, he asked the provincial government for permission to build a permanent residence, but the request was denied. In spite of the obstacles placed in his path, Novakovic and Eustatievici worked to organize the revived diocese. In 1766, Novaković held a census, finding that there were 635,454 Orthodox under his jurisdiction. The following year, he counted 1224 priests in 44 archpriests' districts. He had ordained 198 of these, while the remainder were ordained either in Wallachia and Moldavia or by Serbian bishops in Arad and Timișoara. His findings constitute the oldest detailed listing of Orthodox priests in Transylvania. Dionisije made several pastoral visits and learned the Romanian language with the help of Eustatievici.

Later, Eustatievici served as secretary of the new vicar Ioan Popovici, an archpriest in Hondol, Hunedoara County, who held the post for ten years until 1784. Then, on 6 November 1783, Gedeon Niketich was appointed as Bishop of Transylvania, ordained at Sremski Karlovci on 9 May 1784, and installed at Sibiu on 1 July that year. Ghedeon Niketici was the last Serbian bishop whom Dimitrie Eustatievici served as secretary. The two had known each other for many years, for Ghedeon had been a student at the Kyiv Theological Academy at the same time as Eustatievici.

In 1786 he was appointed the first director of National Romanian and Serbian Schools in Transylvania and teacher of the first pedagogical-theological course in Sibiu (1786–1795).

He spoke Serbian, Romanian, Russian, Hungarian, German, Latin, Greek and Old Slavonic.

== Works ==
Eustatievici was a polyglot and editor of textbooks and manuals, he was a translator as well.

- He compiled a series of textbooks;
- The first Romanian grammar known in 1757 (left in manuscript, published only in 1969);
- Textbook on arithmetic and accounting, Sibiu, 1789;
- The devotions and interpretations of the Gospels of the feasts and of some days, Sibiu, 1790;
- Synopsis of the old and new Testament. Sibiu, 1791;
- Several translations from Russian and Slavo-Serbian are also attributed to him;
- Baronius' ecclesiastical analysis (revision of an older partial translation, ms);
- Probably a Catechism, begun by him and continued by Nicolae Stoica of Hateg, printed in Vienna in 1777, in Serbian, Romanian and German, under the title of Little Catihism or Short Orthodox confession of the unprecedented Greek law;
- The Life of Alexander the Great.

== See also ==
- Visarion Pavlović
- Dionisije Novaković
- Avram Mrazović
- Teodor Janković Mirijevski
- Atanasije Dimitrijević Sekereš
- Stefan Vujanovski
- Uroš Nestorović
