= Emanuel Kozačinski =

Writer, pedagogue, actor and theater worker

Emanuel Kozačinski (Ukrainian: Мануїл Козачинський, romanized: Manuil Kozachyns'kyi, Serbian: Мануил Козачинскиј), also known as Michael Kozachynskyi (Ukrainian: Михайло Козачинський, romanized: Mykhailo Kozachynskyi, Serbian: Михаил Козачинскиј; 1699 — 15 August 1755) was a writer, pedagogue, actor and theater worker who was active in the territories of modern-day Ukraine, Serbia and Russia.

== Biography ==
Born in Yampil, Podolia, Kozačinski studied philosophy in Moscow until 1720, after which he continued his education at the Kiev Theological Academy. During his studies in Kiev, he traveled across lands inhabited by Slavs and Germans. Once he got a degree, Kozačinski started working as an associate at the Academy, teaching junior classes.

On the invitation of Metropolitan Vikentije Jovanović, Kozačinski traveled from Kiev to Sremski Karlovci in 1733, accompanied with a group of professors. He started to work as a teacher of Slavic-Latin schools (Collegium slavono-latino carloviciense) which was already established at the time. During his tenure, schooling was largely improved and organized on the syllabus school system introduced during the era of Peter the Great.

The first recorded theatrical performance, "The Death of Tsar Uroš", was presented in the school of Emanuel Kozačinski in Karlovci. Written by Kozačinski, it remained in manuscript and waited 62 years to reappear, then published and adapted by Jovan Rajić, the author's disciple. The Baroque drama was Traedokomedija centered about the subject of the death of Stefan Uroš V, which was first performed in June 1734. The play was very popular and later performed in Novi Sad and Zrenjanin with rearrangement done by Jovan Rajić.

Emanuel Kozačinski was a director of all schools in Sremski Karlovci during 1735-1736 and afterwards rector of all Slavic-Latin schools on the territory of Metropolitanate of Karlovci. There he wrote textbooks, namely Artis oratoriae libri IV (1735). This was at a time during the development of humanistic education of the Western-style among the Serbs. Some of the textbooks like De poesi seu de ligate oratione were written by an anonymous Serbian author in 1729.

His placement as the head of a network of schools was heavily criticized by priests and other Serbian Orthodox Church officials on account of Emanuel not being a member of the clergy, which forced Metropolitan Vikentije (Jovanović) to ordain him into the priesthood.

Facing numerous plots and protests after the death of Vikentije, his protector, Emanuel went to Vienna. Later, he worked as a teacher in Novi Sad for a year before leaving for Kiev.

Upon his return to Kiev, Emanuel was reinstalled as a professor at the Kiev Academy associated with the Pechersk Lavra monastery, and he also started to work for a local theater company, writing a play Obraz strastej mira sego obrazom stražduščago Hrista ispravi sja, which he also directed in 1739. A noted professor of philosophy and theology, Kozačinski served as a deputy of the Academy's rector Silvester Kuliabka. Emanuel was made the head of a welcome committee established in 1744 for the visit of Elizabeth of Russia, and for that purpose, he wrote several works in her honour, including a play Blagoutrobija Marka Avrelija Antonina. The play's publication, which was issued in Lviv in 1745, included a genealogy of the Razumovsky family and contained panegyrics in honour of Alexei Razumovsky and his brother, future hetman Kirill Razumovsky.

Kozačinski left the Academy in 1746 because of a dispute with staff members and went on to pursue his career as a cleric in Vydubychi Monastery, where he was appointed archimandrite. He and another Russian countryman, Maxim Suvorov, founded the Intercession of the Theotokos schools in Karlovci between 1749 and 1768.

He died of jaundice and was buried in Sluck.

== Works ==
Emanuel Kozačinski left numerous works: rhetoric, poetry and philosophy textbooks, songs, psalms, speeches, dramas. He is best known for his book on Aristotle, published in 1745, which made him to be renowned as the best Aristotle scholar among Orthodox Christians of the era. He also contributed to the popularity of Meletius Smotrytsky's grammar in Serbia.

=== Selected works ===
- Traedokomedije, 1734.
- Blagoutrobija Marka Avrelija Antonina, 1744.

== See also ==
- Joakim Vujić
- Marko Jelisejić
- Jovan Rajić
- Antonije Hadžić
- August von Kotzebue
