= Avram Mrazović =

Serbian writer and aristocrat (1756–1826)

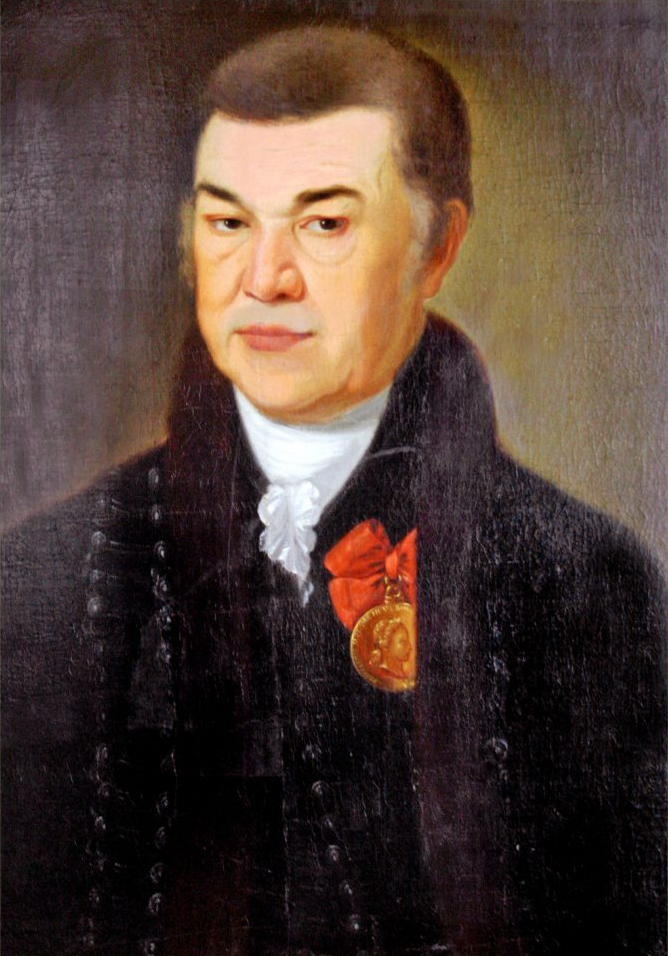
A portrait of Mrazović by Arsenije Teodorović from 1820

Avram Mrazović (Serbian Cyrillic: Аврам Мразовић; 12 March 1756 – 20 February 1826) was a Serbian writer, translator, pedagogue, aristocrat and politician from Sombor. He was the first to institutionalize a modern teacher training program in 1778 which eventually became a teachers' college in Sombor.

== Biography ==
Avram Mrazović was born in Sombor, at the time a Free Royal City in the Habsburg monarchy, today in Serbia. He was the son of Reverend and Mr. Georgije Mrazović, parish priest of the Serbian Orthodox Church of Saint John the Baptist in Sombor.

He served as a senator in Sombor for almost forty years.

Mrazović is known in literary annals as a Serbian education reformer who lived and worked in the Habsburg Empire in Serb and Romanian territories of today's Serbian Vojvodina and Romanian Banat at the same time as Teodor Janković Mirijevski and Stefan Vujanovski. He is the first director of the Serb National Primary School Commission after being named to the post by his mentor, Teodor Janković-Mirijevski. He also founded Norma (Normal school), a teacher training college in Sombor in 1778 before another school was opened in 1812 in Szentendre called Regium Pedagogium Nationis Illiricae (Preparandium in Latin or Preparadija in Serbian) which eventually was relocated back to Sombor in 1816. Mrazović wrote and published Rukovodstvo k slavenstej grammatice: vo upotreblenik slaveno-serbskih narodnyh ucilisc (a Serbian grammar with correct syntax) in Vienna in 1794 for Serbian schools. He credited Meletius Smotrytsky's 1619 work as his inspiration.

The first book on logic in the Serbian language was written by Nikola Šimić, Avram Mrazović's friend, and was published in Budapest in two volumes, entitled "Logic" (Vol. I, 1808; Vol. II, 1809). Ten years later, Mrazović wrote the second book on logic in Serbian, entitled "Logic, or Reasoning", which he completed in 1826, the year he died. The book was not published.

Mrazović translated the French work of Jeanne-Marie Leprince de Beaumont, and the Latin of Ovid, Cicero, Virgil, Horace, Quintilian, and the Greek of Aristotle as well as the Russian of Mikhail Lomonosov.

== Works ==
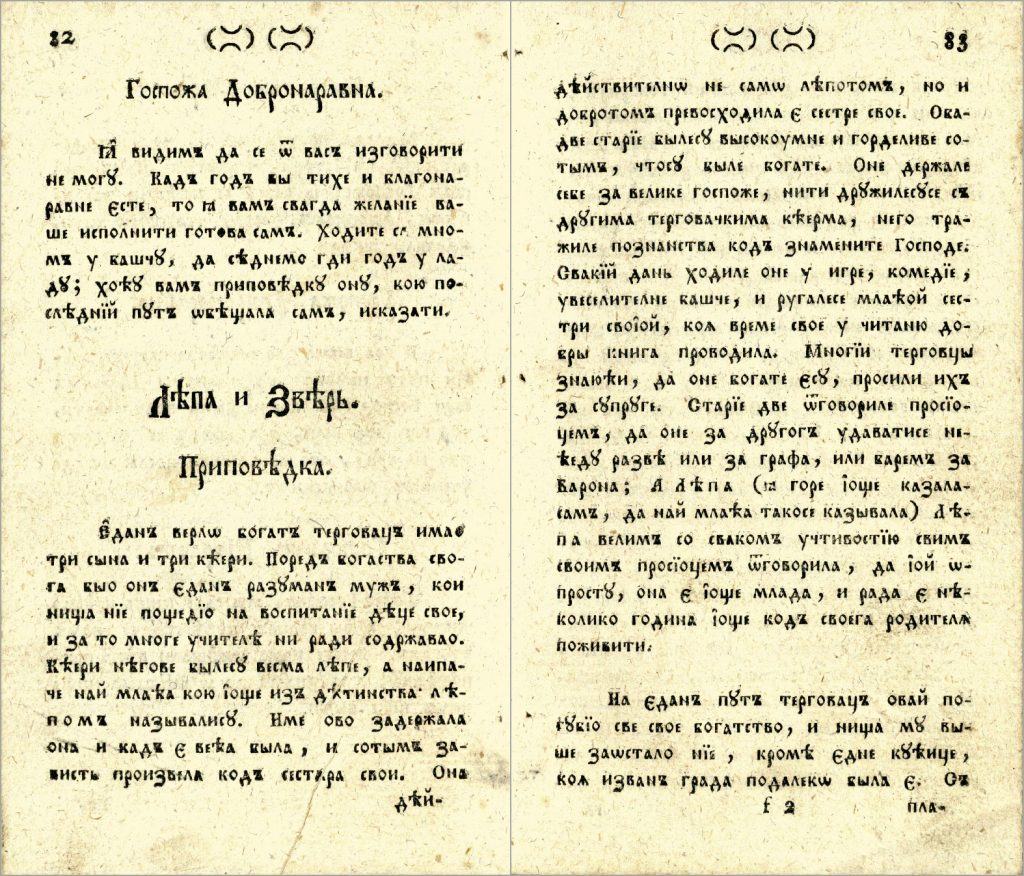
Beauty and the Beast written in Slavonic-Serbian, 1787, translated by Avram Mrazović.

- Rukovodstvo k slavenstej grammatice: vo upotreblenik slaveno-serbskih narodnyh ucilisc (1794)
- Celovekomerzosti I raskajaniju (1808)
- Epistolarum de Ponto livri V (Buda, 1818)
- Rukovodstvo k slavenskomu krasnoreciju vo upotreblenik ljubiteleij slavenskago jezyka izdano Avraamom ot Mrazovic (1821)
- Logic, or Reasoning, completed in 1826 but unpublished.

== See also ==
- Dositej Obradović
- Teodor Janković Mirijevski
- Atanasije Dimitrijević Sekereš
- Stefan Vujanovski
- Uroš Nestorović
- Dimitrie Eustatievici
- Djordje Natošević
