= Dionisije Novaković =

Dionisije Novaković (Serbian: Дионисије Новаковић, Romanian: Dionisie Novacovici; ca. 1705 – 8 December 1767) was a Serbian Orthodox bishop in the Habsburg monarchy, and one of the most learned men of his time. He occupied the post of Bishop of the Eparchy of Budapest from 1749 to 1769.

== Biography ==
=== Origins and appointment to Transylvania ===
An ethnic Serb, he became a monk at an early age at Savina Monastery in the Bay of Kotor region, and was later made hierodeacon. In 1725, he was sent to study in Kiev, first attending gymnasium and then the Kiev Theological Academy, returning home in 1737. In 1739, he was named professor of theology and philosophy at the seminary in Novi Sad. In 1747, by then a hieromonk, he was transferred to the Eparchy of Buda. When the episcopal seat fell vacant, he was elected bishop, an act confirmed by the Imperial Court in Vienna. In July 1749, the Metropolitan of Karlovci, Pavle Nenadović, consecrated him bishop. However, his enthronement only took place in February 1751, as Nenadović was displeased that Novaković had the support of the imperial authorities. In that year he consecrated the large new Serbian Orthodox church in Buda that was being built since 1742.

In late 1758 and into the following year, Orthodox unrest rose in Transylvania, caused by harsh measures taken by the head of the Romanian Greek-Catholic Church, Petru Pavel Aron, as well as the local authorities. A series of ministerial conferences took place in Vienna and decided to name an Orthodox bishop, with the stipulation that he was forbidden to oppose the spread of Greek-Catholicism. The alternative of placing the community under Karlovci was dismissed for its potential to create a unified Orthodox bloc, while the suggestion they adhere to the Russian Orthodox Church was viewed as even more dangerous.

Thus, in October 1758, State Chancellor Wenzel Anton Kaunitz proposed Novaković, whom he viewed as wise but not zealous, unlikely to damage Catholicism and with the potential to bring his entire flock to the state church. In spite of internal dissent which viewed the deteriorating situation as the work of Karlovci and proposed it be dealt with by expelling and arresting emissaries of the Serbian metropolitan, Empress Maria Theresa approved the plan. The following July, she issued a decree of toleration for the province's Orthodox population. Dionisije initially declined, due to his inability to speak Romanian, but later promised to learn the language in a few months. In March 1761, the Austrian government named Novaković administrator of the Orthodox church in Transylvania over the objections of Nenadović. After receiving instructions from Vienna, he set out for the provincial capital Sibiu, arriving during Holy Week, some three weeks after the new military governor, General Adolf Nikolaus von Buccow.

=== Activity as bishop ===
Over the next few months, Dionisije accompanied the general on a tour of the province, in order to assess the situation of the Orthodox church. For example, at Alba Iulia, he was forced to accept the cession of two parishes to the Greek-Catholic Church. One account holds that Petru Pavel Aron, head of the latter institution, officiated a liturgy in an empty, formerly Orthodox church, while Novaković did the same in the yard, drawing a large crowd.

In July 1761, Maria Theresa signed a decree appointing Dionisije to his post in Transylvania; at the same time, he kept his office in Buda. In September, von Buccow installed him in St. Nicholas Church in Șcheii Brașovului, reading the decree in Latin, following which the bishop delivered a speech in the same language. Beforehand, the priests and laymen of Șchei, known for their attachment to Orthodoxy, obliged him to swear allegiance to the faith. The following year, the empress issued a new decree of toleration, this time accompanied by eleven conditions meant to facilitate conversion to Greek Catholicism.

Given the cool reception he met in Brașov, Dionisije chose Sibiu as his residence, initially renting a house for two years. During one of his absences, the building was taken over by the head of the local post office, forcing the bishop to move to a three-room peasant house in Rășinari that still stands. In 1764, upon the insistence of his archpriests, he asked the provincial government for permission to build a permanent residence, but the request was denied. It is not known where in Sibiu he held services: either in an improvised chapel, or in the neighboring village churches.

In spite of the obstacles placed in his path, Novaković worked to organize the revived diocese. In 1766, he held a census, finding that there were 635,454 Orthodox under his jurisdiction. The following year, he counted 1224 priests in 44 archpriests' districts. He had ordained 198 of these, while the remainder were ordained either in Wallachia and Moldavia or by Serbian bishops in Arad and Timișoara. His findings constitute the oldest detailed listing of Orthodox priests in Transylvania. Dionisije made several pastoral visits and learned the Romanian language with the help of his secretary and fellow Kiev pupil Dimitrie Eustatievici. He even wrote several short dogmatic and polemical works in the language, but these have been lost.

=== Final years ===
The new bishop, received coldly due to his foreign origins and particularly because he had been named from Vienna; faced with serious restrictions that impeded his work; and longing for his Serbian followers in Buda, submitted his resignation in December 1762. This was rejected, but over the following years, he continued to submit petitions requesting his transfer back to Buda. He made suggestions as to his successor, recommending that he be enthroned in his presence so as to avoid incident. Dionisije's advice was ignored, and his resignation was only accepted in February 1767, to take effect in October. He left Transylvania in autumn, settling in Szentendre, which had a large Serbian community. He died two months later, and was buried in the town.

Novaković left behind a certain amount of property, but as he died without a will, this was taken over by the state. Upon the orders of Maria Theresa, the majority went to the Roman Catholic orphanage in Sibiu, while part of it ended up with the Greek-Catholic theological seminary in Blaj.

== Works ==
- O pohvalah i polzje nauk svobodnih, 1744.
- Istorija naturalnaja filosofov, u pitanjima i odgovorima
- O purgatoriji rimskoj, sije jest o ognju čistitelnomu
- Osnovatelnoje pokazanije o ravnostjeh meždu vostočnoj i zapadneju cerkoviju
- Sočinenije o proishoždeniji Sv. Duha
- Privjetstvovanija različnaja vdni roždestva Hristova
- Propedija blagočestija i dolžnostej hristijanskih

== See also ==
- Eparchy of Buda
- Vasilije Dimitrijevic (bishop)
- Visarion Pavlović
- Dimitrie Eustatievici
- Simeon Končarević
- Vasilije Jovanović-Brkić
