= Zaharije Orfelin =

Serbian polymath (1726–1785)

Zaharije Orfelin Захаријe Орфелин
- Born: 1726; Vukovar, Slavonia, Hungary
- Died: 19 January 1785 (aged 58–59); Novi Sad, Hungary
- Occupations: Poet, writer, historian, editor, engraver
- Writing career
- Movement: Baroque

Zaharije Orfelin (Serbian Cyrillic: Захаријe Орфелин; 1726 – 19 January 1785) was a Serbian polymath who lived and worked in the Habsburg monarchy and Venice. Considered a Renaissance man, he is variously described as a theologist, scientist, poet, engraver, painter, lexicographer, herbalist, oenologist, historian, publisher and translator.

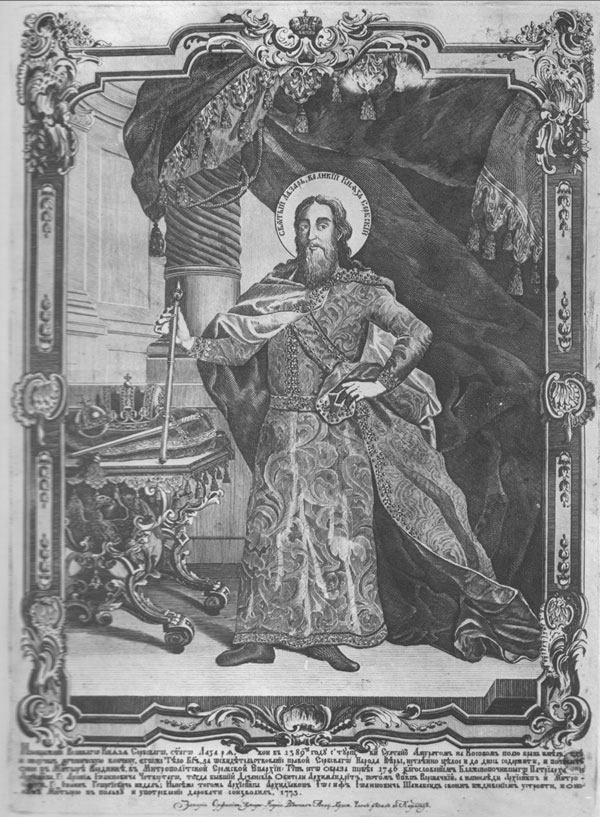
Saint Lazar, Serbian Great Prince, a copperplate by Orfelin (1773).

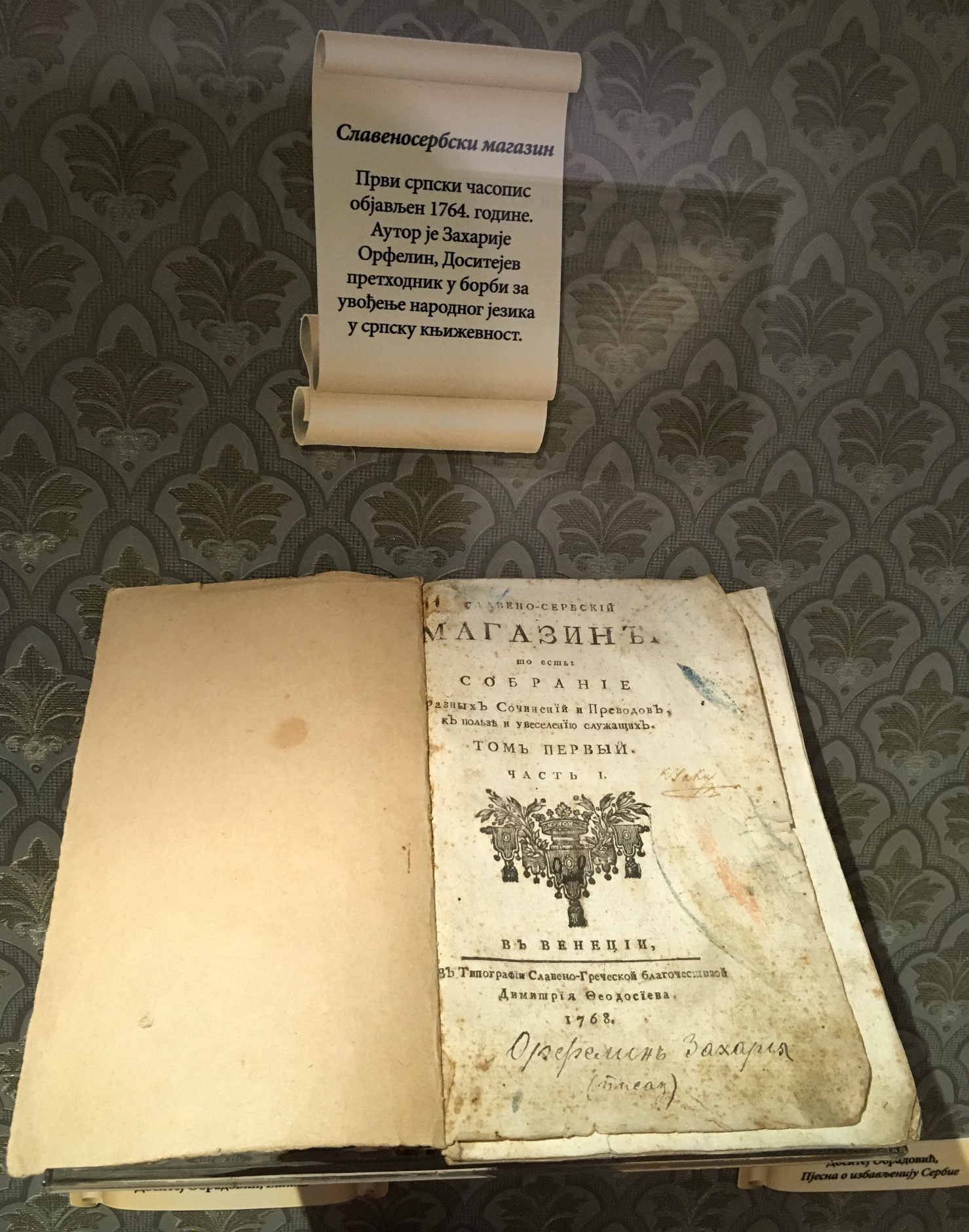
The first Serbian magazine by Zaharije Orfelin, published in 1764.

== Biography ==
He was born in a Serb family in Vukovar in 1726, in the period after the Great Turkish War. His father's name was Jovan. Zaharije's nephew was the painter Jakov Orfelin.

Orfelin's first published work was Краткоје о богоподобајуштем телу и крови Христовој поклоненији и временитога настављенија, written during his scribal service as a scribe for the Metropolitan Nenadović in 1758.

It is assumed that he was trained in Budapest and Vienna, as well as that he subsequently studied on his own in Novi Sad.

Свети Ђорђе са изгледом манастира Сенђурђа (Saint George with a view of the Senđurđa monastery) from 1767 is Orfelin's work from 1760, for which the art historian Dinko Davidov believes that this copper engraving was "a kind of specialist exercise" on the basis of which Jakob Schmutzer accepted as an honorary member of the Viennese copper engraving academy in 1767.

Orfelin served under bishop Vićentije Jovanović Vidak in Temesvár until 1764. Then he went to Venice, where he worked as a proofreader of Serbian books in Dimitrije Teodosi's printing house. It is believed that he occasionally traveled to Vienna from Venice for work and other reasons.

He died on January 19, 1785, in Novi Sad, Sajlovo, and is buried in a nearby church.

== Work ==
Orfelin appeared on the Serbian cultural scene in 1758.

He was successful as a painter, calligrapher and copper-engraver, he did several works in copper-engraving. One of them represents Saint Sava. In the 1870s, he was elected an honorary member of the Academy of Arts in Vienna.

As a poet, Orfelin is the most significant figure in Serbian poetry of the 18th century. He wrote a dozen longer poems, the most significant of which is Плач Сербији (Lament of Serbia, 1761) in two versions, folk version and Church-Slavonic. It is an anti-Austrian, rebellious song. In that song, Serbia regrets the former glory of the medieval state and criticizes compatriots who forget their national identity.

Orfelin also wrote a manuscript Against Roman Papacy as a reaction to Austria and the Roman Catholic Church's proselytism towards Habsburg Serbs.

Orfelin founded Slavenoserbski magazin in Venice in 1768, credited as the first South Slavic or Serbian journal/periodical though only one number came out.

In 1768, Zaharije Orfelin proclaimed a mixture of Church-Slavonic and vernacular into the Serbian literary language, in which there was always room for specific Russian words, thus practically establishing the Slavic Serbian language. Literary historian Jovan Deretić considers him, along with Jovan Rajić, to be the most important writer of the Russo-Slavic era in Serbian literature.

In 1776 Orfelin's name appears in a lexicon of Austrian artists, Des Gelehte Osterisch by de Luca, where he is listed as both an engraver and a writer, elected as an academician in the newly established Art Academy of Engraving in Vienna, and acknowledged by its director Jacob Matthias Schmutzer.

Zaharije Orfelin is the author of the first modern Serbian spelling book from 1767, which was used by numerous generations of children. The second edition was published in 1797.

He is also the author of the first textbooks of the Latin language. His most extensive work is "The Life of Peter the Great" (Venice, 1772), in whom he saw an enlightened monarch. Zaharije Orfelin also wrote the first Serbian "Perpetual Calendar" in 1780, printed in Vienna in 1783.

Orfelin noted the great importance of medicinal plants and wrote the (unfinished) book "The Great Serbian Herbarium" in which he described about 500 plants, giving each a Latin and folk name. In addition, for each plant he listed "benefits and uses" with data on medicinal effects and therapies, i.e. how that plant can be usefully used, which was common at that time in Europe, and for the first time among the Serbs.

His book Искусни подрумар (Experienced Cellarer, Vienna, 1783) has several hundred recipes for making herbal wines and many other alcoholic and non-alcoholic beverages and medicines. The book also discusses the method and time of harvesting and drying medicinal plants and the usefulness and medicinal value of complex preparations made from more than 200 domestic and exotic medicinal and aromatic plants. Writing about recipes for wine production, Zaharije Orfelin also mentions the recipe for making bermet, which differed from house to house. Orfelin gave a recipe that became popular with various modifications in the Fruška gora region. It is the first book of its kind in the Serbian language.

== Legacy ==
Serbian poet Đorđe Nešić wrote a poem titled A toast to Zaharije Orfelin, inspired by his poetry and publications on winemaking. He is the main character of the novel "Drugo Telo" by Milorad Pavić.

A private secondary school based in Belgrade is named after him.

== Works ==
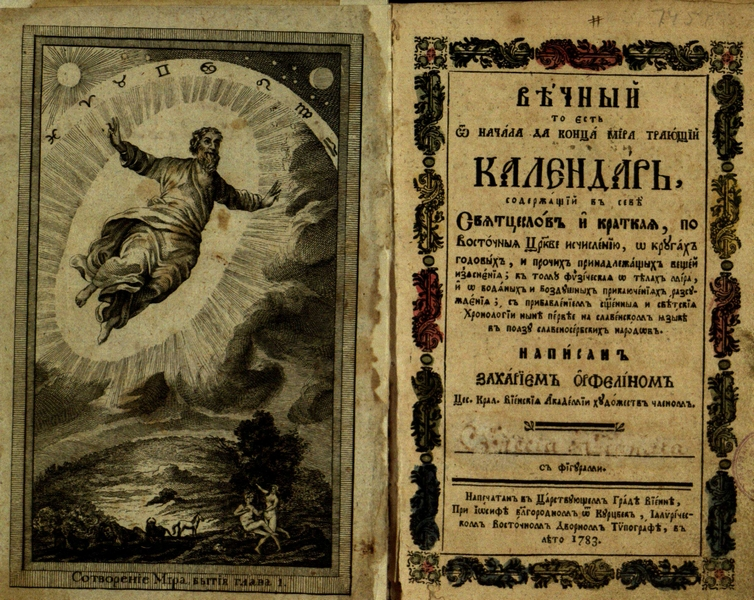
The illustration Creation of the World and the title page of the book Вѣчный калєндарь (Eternal Calendar) by Orfelin, 1783.

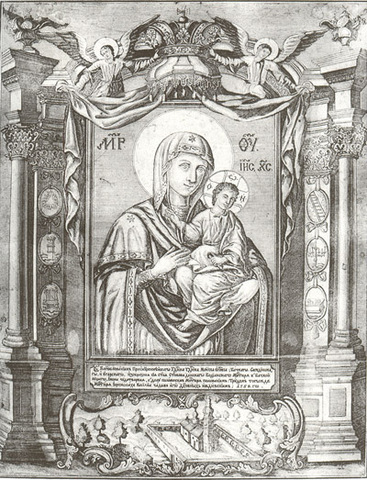
Theotokos of Bođani Monastery, Serbia, 1758

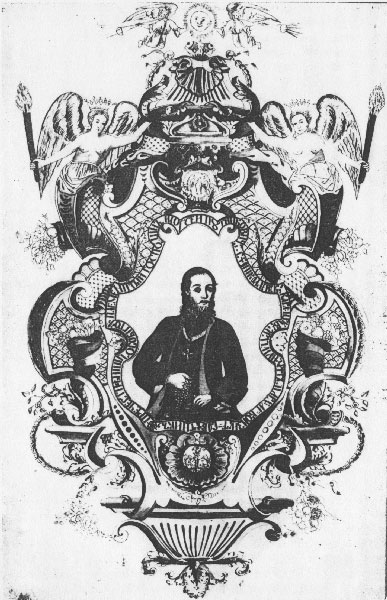
Mojsije Putnik, 1757

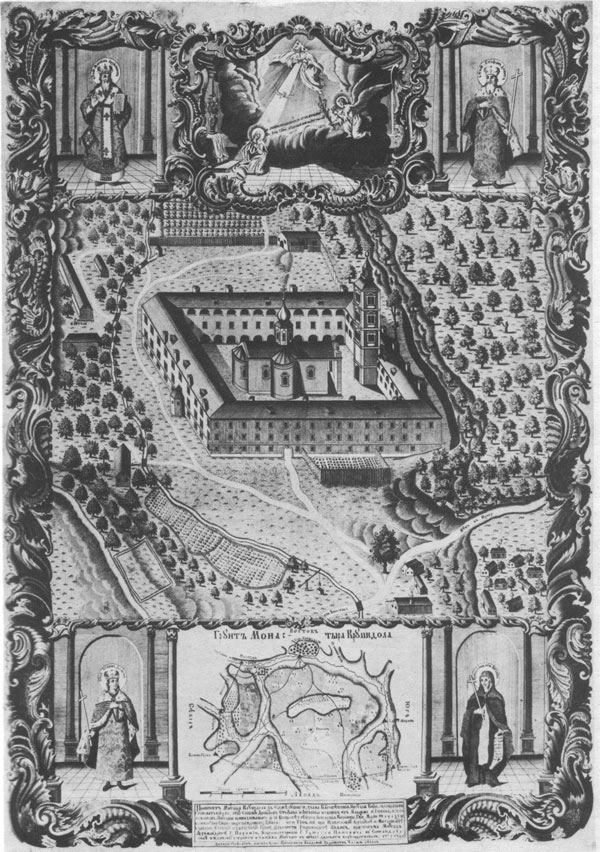
Krušedol Monastery, 1775

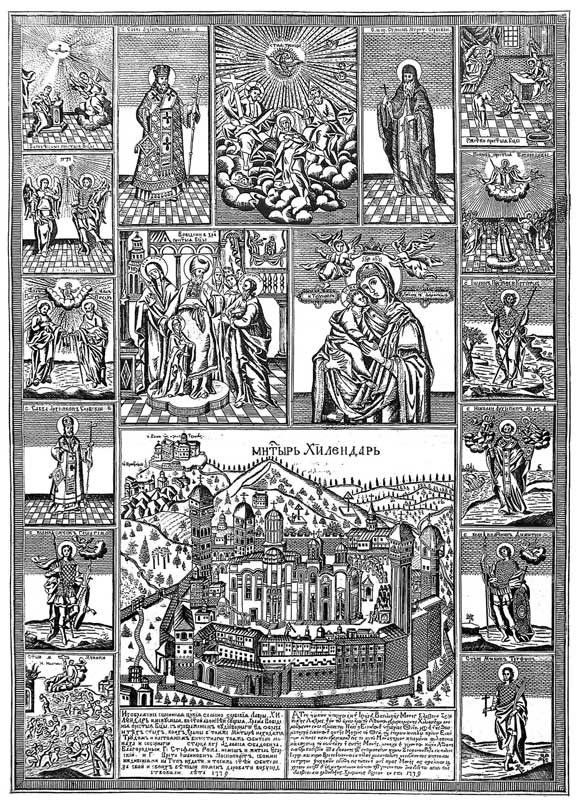
Hilandar Monastery, 1779

- Pesan novosadelanuje za gradjanku gospodicnu Femku, between 1748 and 1757
- Pozdrav Mojseju Putniku, Novi Sad, 1757.
- Omologija, 1758.
- Hulitelj, Sremski Karlovci, 1759.
- Kratkoje o sedmih tajinstvah nastavlenije, 1760.
- Gorestni plač slavnija inogda Serbiji, Venice, 1761
- Trenodija, Venice, 1762
- Plač Serbii, jejaže sini v različnija gosudarstva rasjejali sja, Venice, 1762
- Oda na vospominanije vtorago Hristova prišestvija, 1763.
- Apostolskoje mleko, Timișoara, 1763.
- Istina o Boze, Novi Sad, 1764.
- Hristoljubivih dus stihoslovije, Novi Sad, 1764.
- Sjetovanije naučenogo mladago čelovjeka, 1764.
- Strasno jevandljelje, Venice, 1764.
- Pjesn istoriceskaja, Venice 1765.
- Melodija k proleću, Novi Sad, 1765.
- Slavenosrpski kalendar za godionu 1766., Novi Sad, 1765.
- Latinski bukvar, Venice, 1766.
- Pervija načatki latinskogo jazika, 1767.
- Pervoje ucenije hotjastim ucitisja knig pismeni slavenskimi nazivaemo Bukvar, Venice, 1767.
- Latinska gramatika, Venice, 1768.
- Slaveno-serbski magazin, Venice, 1768.
- Istorija o žitija i slavnih djelah velikago gosudarja i imperatora Petra Pervago, Venice, 1772
- Generalnaja karta vserosijkoj Imperiji, 1774.
- Položenije provuncij: Liflandije, Finlandije, Karelije, Ingrije, i Kurlandije, 1774.
- Karta georaf. Germanije, Holandije, Danije, Poljane, 1774.
- Karta Male Tatarije, 1774.
- Bukvar za srpsku decu slovenski, Venice, 1776.
- Propisi srpski, Sremski Karlovci, 1776.
- Slavenska i vlaska Kaligrafija, Sremski Karlovci, 1778.
- Večni kalendar, Vienna, 1783.
- Iskusni podrumar, Budapest, 1808.
- Sedam stepenej premudrosti

Edited or translated

- Srpska gramatika, 1755.
- Kratkoje nastavlenije, Sremski Karlovci, 1757.
- Ortodoksosomologija ili pravoslavnoje ispovjedanije, Sremski Karlovci, edited 1758.
- Kratko nastavljenije, Sremski Karlovci, 1758.
- Oda na vospominanije vtoraga Hristova prisestvija, Vienna, 1759.
- Molitvoslav, Venice, 1762.
- Psaltir, Venice, 1762.
- Trebnik, Venice, 1762.
- Propoved ili slovo o osuzdeniji, Venice, 1764.
- Evangelija ctomaja vo sjatij i velikij cetveretok, Venice, 1764.
- Catechisis by Peter Mohyla
- Catechisis by Jovan Rajić
- Srbljak (a compedium of old Serbian writings)
- Short Stories by Feofan Prokopovich

== Literature ==
- Čurčić, Laza. Knjiga o Zahariji Orfelinu. Zagreb: Srpsko kulturno društvo Prosvjeta, 2002. pp. 372–387. ISBN 978-953-6627-45-5.
- Simić, Vladimir M. (2013). Zaharija Orfelin (1726—1785). Beograd: Filozofski fakultet Univerziteta u Beogradu.
