= Johann Julius Hecker =

German educator

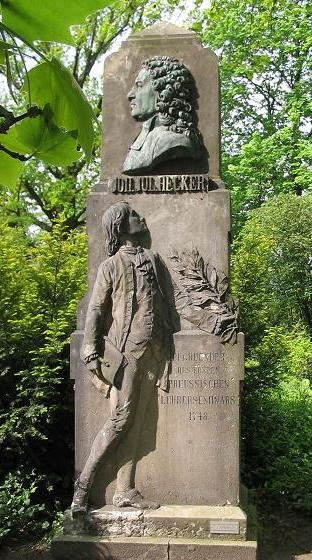
Memorial to Johann Julius Hecker, on Schlossinsel in Berlin-Köpenick

Johann Julius Hecker (December 2, 1707 – June 24, 1768) was a German educator who established the first Realschule (practical high school) and Prussia's first teacher-education institution.

== Biography ==
Hecker was born to a family of educators in Werden, then part of Prussia. As a young man, he formed an interest in theology and was drawn to pietism and the ideas of August Hermann Francke. After completing the gymnasium in Essen, he studied theology, ancient languages, medicine, and natural sciences at the University of Halle. In 1729 he became a teacher in the Francke Pädagogium, teaching every subject, including Latin, Greek, Hebrew, German, religion, history, arithmetic, botany, anatomy, physiology, and chemistry.

In 1735, Prussian king Frederick William I appointed Hecker to the position of pastor and school inspector for the Militärwaisenhaus in Potsdam, a home and school for the children and orphans of military personnel. A sermon that Hecker delivered in 1738 so impressed Frederick William that he appointed Hecker to be the first pastor of the new Trinity Church in Berlin, which was consecrated in 1739.

In his role as pastor of Trinity Church, Hecker started six four-class elementary schools for education of the local populace. The schools were initially financed from Hecker's personal funds, a school lottery, and private donations.

In 1747 he founded the first Realschule, the "Economic-mathematical Realschule" in Berlin, in which young people who were not suited for a traditional classical education could obtain a practical education to prepare them for careers in fields such as business, manufacturing, and the fine arts. The school emphasized visual and hands-on instruction, including visits to factories and artisans' workshops, instead of rote learning. In 1748, Hecker established a seminary for the training of teachers, the first such institution in Prussia.

Frederick William's son Frederick II (known as Frederick the Great), who became king of Prussia in 1740, was a proponent of Hecker's work. With the king's encouragement, Hecker started a garden near his school. In addition to vegetables, herbs, and fruit trees, the garden included a mulberry plantation for the purpose of silk production.

Hecker's educational work was a major influence on the formulation of Prussia's first general school law, issued by Frederick II in 1763, which formed the basis for a system of state-supported primary schools.

He died in Berlin in 1768.
