= Johann Ignaz von Felbiger =

Prussian minister and Austrian school reformer

Johann lgnaz von Felbiger
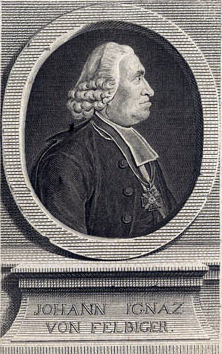
- Born: Johann lgnaz von Felbinger; 6 January 1724; Gross-Glogau, Prussian Silesia (now Głogów, Poland)
- Died: 17 May 1788 (aged 64); Presburg, Hungary (now Bratislava, Slovakia)
- Occupation(s): Priest, educationist
- Known for: Reform of the Austrian school system

Johann Ignaz von Felbiger (6 January 1724 – 17 May 1788) was a minister in the Prussian government and Austrian school reformer, pedagogical writer, and Canon Regular.

== Life ==
Born 6 January 1724, at Gross-Glogau in Silesia, von Felbiger was the son of a postmaster, who had been ennobled by Emperor Charles VI. The death of his parents constrained him, after studying theology at the University of Breslau, to accept (1744) the position of teacher in a private family. In 1746, he joined the Order of Canons Regular of St Augustine at Sagan in Silesia (now Żagań, Poland), was ordained a priest in 1748, and ten years later became abbot of the monastery of Sagan.

Noting the condition of the local Catholic schools, he strove to improve them by publishing his first school-ordinance in 1761. During the private journey to Berlin, in 1762, he was favourably impressed with Johann Julius Hecker's Realschule and Hähn's method of instructing by initials and tables (Literal- or Tabellen-Methode), and became an enthusiastic propagator of this method. A school-ordinance for the dependencies of the monastery of Sagan was issued in 1763, teachers' college was established, and Felbiger's school reforms soon attracted the attention of Catholics and Protestants alike. He was supported by the Silesian minister von Schlabrendorff, and at the latter's request, after a second journey to Berlin he elaborated general school-ordinance for the Catholic elementary schools in Silesia (1765). Three graded catechisms, the joint work of the prior and the abbot of Sagan, appeared in 1766 under the title, Silesian Catechism, and enjoyed a wide circulation. The death of von Schlabrendorff in 1769 marked the end of the Silesian government's educational efforts. Felbiger's suggestions were heeded, however, by King Frederick II of Prussia in regulations issued (1774) for Silesian higher schools.

In 1774, Felbiger was invited by the Holy Roman Empress Maria Theresa to initiate reform of the school system. He moved to Vienna, where he was appointed General Commissioner of Education for the Austrian and Bohemian lands of the empire. This school reforms aimed to create a sense of national unity among the population of the empire and set higher education standards. The same year he published general school-ordinance, and in 1775 his most important pedagogical production: Methodenbuch für Lehrer der deutschen Schulen. In 1777 the Czech translation titled Kniha methodní pro učitelé českých škol was published. His school-reform was copied by Bavaria and other German lands and was not without influence on Russia. Opposition developed when Felbiger proposed to extend his school reforms to the military academies. Maria Theresa and her minister Franz Sales Greiner protected Felbiger from the opposition at court, but his plan for reform of the military academies was dropped. After Maria Theresa´s death, Felbiger´s strictly religious principles education aroused the opposition of her successor Joseph II, who removed him from his position, and re-assigned him to look after educational interests in Hungary (1782). In 1776, Felbiger with members of the Illyrian Court Deputation wrote the procedures for elementary schools for Orthodox children in Banat, which were published in German and Serbian.

The chief peculiarity of Felbiger's too mechanical method was the use of tables containing the initials of the words which expressed the lesson to be imparted. Other features were the substitution of class-instruction for individual instruction and the practice of questioning the pupils. He aimed at raising the social standing, financial condition, and professional qualification of the teaching body, at giving a friendly character to the mutual relations between teacher and pupil. For a list of his 78 publications, which are mainly of a pedagogical character, see Panholzer's Methodenbuch (46-66).

He died on 17 May 1788, aged 64, at Presburg in Hungary (now Bratislava, Slovakia).

== Sources ==
- Granese, Alberto (2008). La conversazione educativa. Eclisse o rinnovamento della ragione pedagogica. Armando Editore. ISBN 978-88-6081-297-1.
- Ebel, Bartel Edward (1955). The Expression of the Comic in the Plays of Ferdinand Raimund. Department of Germanic and Romanic Languages, Stanford University.
- Roider, Karl A. (1973). Maria Theresa. Prentice-Hall. ISBN 978-0-13-556191-1.
- Leger, Louis (1928). Austria-Hungary. P. F. Collier & Son Company.
- Rothe, Georg (2011). Die Gewerbeschule des Großherzogtums Baden als frühes Modell einer Teilzeitschule im dual-alternierenden System: Einfluss der Polytechnischen Schule Karlsruhe auf die Entwicklung der badischen Gewerbeschule; Anstöße zur Beseitigung aktueller Defizite in der deutschen Berufsausbildung in Anlehnung an Empfehlungen der Europäischen Kommission. KIT Scientific Publishing. ISBN 978-3-86644-647-2.
- Peti-Stantić, Anita (2008). Jezik naš i. Srednja Europa. ISBN 978-953-6979-54-7.
- Stollberg-Rilinger, Barbara (2017). Maria Theresia: Die Kaiserin in ihrer Zeit. Eine Biographie. Munich: C.H. Beck. ISBN 978-3-406-69748-7.
