= Jovan Rajić =

Serbian theologian, writer, historian

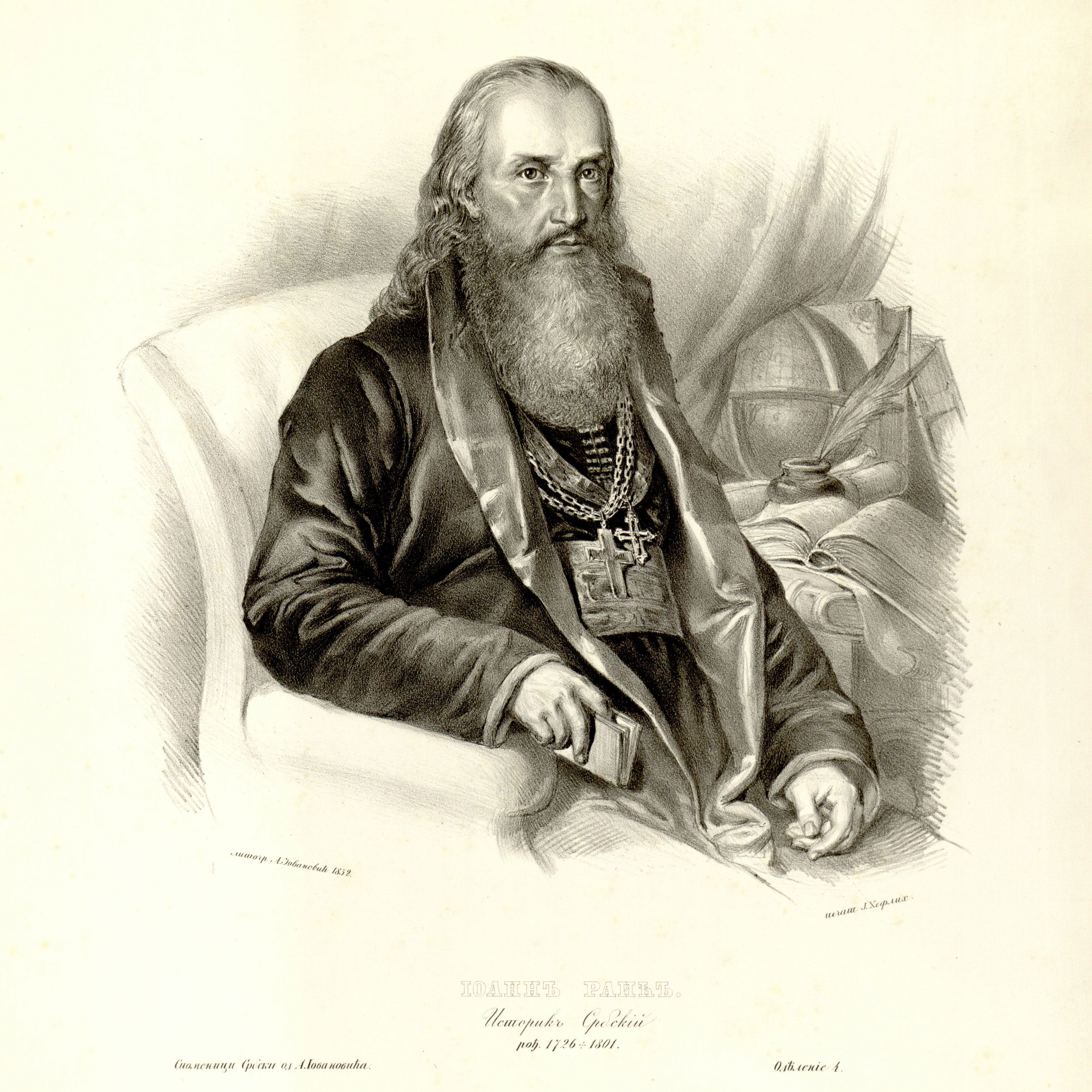
- Born: November 11, 1726; Sremski Karlovci, Slavonian Military Frontier, Habsburg monarchy
- Died: December 11, 1801 (aged 75); Kovilj
- Education: NaUKMA
- Occupations: Writer; Theologian; Historian

Jovan Rajić (Serbian Cyrillic: Јован Рајић; November 11, 1726 – December 11, 1801) was a Serbian writer, historian, theologian, and pedagogue.

Rajić was the forerunner to modern Serbian historiography, and has been compared to the importance of Nikolay Karamzin to Russian historiography.

== Biography ==
He was born into a poor family in Sremski Karlovci in Habsburg monarchy on November 11, 1726. His father Rajo (Radoslav) was from Vidin and had married a Serbian woman. Rajić had elementary education in his hometown. In 1744, he enrolled in the Jesuit grammar school in Komárno, and after completing the sixth form there, he went to Sopron to continue his education at the Protestant lyceum. As part of his studies, he mastered Latin, Church Slavonic, Russian, German and Hungarian. Rajić went to the Russian Empire, where he studied theology at the Kievo-Mogyla Academy in Kiev from 1753 to 1756. After his graduation, Rajić visited Moscow, Smolensk, Constantinople and Mount Athos. In 1758, he spent two months in the Hilandar Monastery, where he possibly met Bulgarian monk Paisius of Hilandar. From 1759 to 1762, he was a teacher of geography and rhetoric and then worked as the rector of the School of the Intercession of the Virgin in Sremski Karlovci. The Bishop of Bačka, Mojsije Putnik, invited him to Novi Sad, where he taught theology as a professor at the Theological Academy, serving at the same time as its rector, for five years. In 1772, he took monastic vows in the Monastery of the Holy Archangels in the village Kovilj. He became a hieromonk and eventually became a hegemon of the monastery. Rajić died as the abbot of the monastery in Kovilj on December 11, 1801.

== Works ==
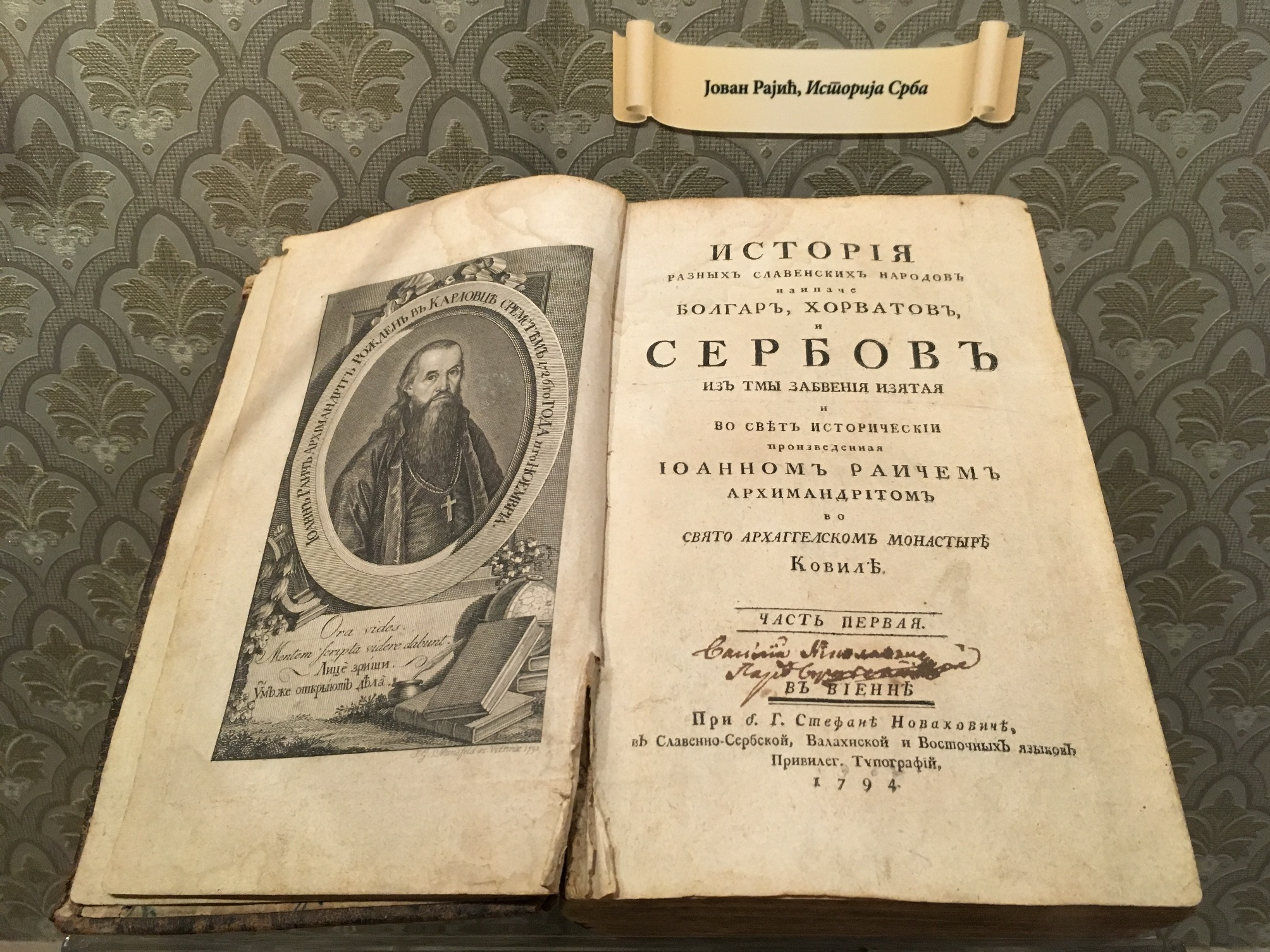
Rajić's The History of Various Slavic Peoples, especially the Bulgars, Croats and the Serbs, Museum of Vuk and Dositej

His five-volume The Theological Body was written under the influence of the work by Theophan Prokopovich and St. Augustine. In 1774, Rajić wrote Catechism, which was printed in 10,000 copies and had five printings during his lifetime, making it the most published Serbian book in the 18th century.

Rajić's main work is the History of Various Slavic Peoples, especially the Bulgars, Croats, and the Serbs, which he finished in 1768, after a decade. The first volume of this four-volume work was published in 1794 in Vienna, with the help of the Metropolitan of Karlovci Stefan Stratimirović. It was the first significant historical work about Serbs. The book, consisting of 2,000 pages, follows the medieval religious historiographical tradition, being influenced by Caesar Baronius' Annales Ecclesiastici and Mavro Orbini's Kingdom of the Slavs. Relying on Byzantine sources as well, his book discusses the political relations between the Byzantine Empire and the South Slavs. According to historian Mihael T. Antolović, Rajić wanted to inform educated Serbs about their past, preserve and strengthen national consciousness among his compatriots through the historical continuity with the traditions of the Serbian medieval state. Per him, Rajić’s work influenced the next generations of educated Serbs, and it was the main source of knowledge about Serbian history.

In the second volume of his book, he classified Bosnia and Herzegovina, Dalmatia, and Slavonia as Serbian lands. The last volume of his book was published in 1795. The book was translated into Russian and Bulgarian. Per historian Mitko B. Panov, Rajić wanted to demonstrate Slavic unity and that his argument that the people neighboring the Serbs were "of the same blood", reflects his habit to present the common history of the South Slavs and to depict them as a homogeneous ethnic entity. According to Slavist Igor Kaliganov, his conclusions in the book were often affected by patriotic feelings and Orthodox predilections, and parts of the book had a biased and pro-Serbian character. Per him, it remained the main academic source on the national history for Serbs until the 1860s.

In 1798, he made an adaptation of the play by Emanuel Kozačinski, Tragicomedy on the death of Uroš V from 1736, titled Tragedy or sad history on the death of the last Serbian emperor. He began to write poetry from the 1790s with the poem Pjesni različnija (Various verses), published in Bech in 1790. Rajić published the historical and allegorical poem, Boj zmaja sa orlovi (The Fight of the Snake with the Eagles) in Bech in 1791 in Vienna during the Austro-Turkish War, which was dedicated to the capture of Belgrade in 1789 by Austrian forces. In the poem, the "Snake" represents the Ottoman Empire, while the "Eagles" represent the Russian Empire and Habsburg Empire.

== See also ==
- Antonije Hadžić
- Joakim Vujić
- Dositej Obradović
- Stefan von Novaković
- Emanuel Kozačinski
- Visarion Pavlović
- Simeon Končarević
- Zaharije Orfelin
- Vikentije Jovanović
- Gerasim Zelić
