= Stefan von Novaković =

Serbian writer and publisher

Stefan von Novaković (Osijek, Habsburg monarchy, c. 1740 – Osijek, Habsburg Monarchy, 1826) was a Serbian writer and publisher of Serbian books in Vienna and patron of Serbian literature.

== Biography ==
Novaković, a well-educated lawyer who lived and worked in Sremski Karlovci, was a court secretary to Metropolitan Mojsije Putnik before becoming a court agent, nominated by the Emperor to the highest organ of the Hungarian administration, the Hungarian Court Chancellery in Vienna. He was ennobled in 1791.

In 1770, in response to repeated requests by Metropolitan Stevan Stratimirović of Sremski Karlovci for a Serbian printing press, authorities finally granted monopoly rights for printing of Serbian/Cyrillic books to a Viennese printer, Josef von Kurzböck. When Kurzböck died, von Novaković, at the instigation of Metropolitan Stefan (Stratimirović), bought from Kurzböck's widow Katharina the entire estate, including the former Serbian court printing house, the monopoly rights and the entire inventory of books from 1770, and from 1792 to 1795 some 70 more Serbian books were printed, mostly by important authors such as Dositej Obradović, Jovan Rajić, Meletius Smotrytsky, Uroš Nestorović, Stefan Vujanovski, Pavel Kengelac, Avram Mrazović, Vikentije Ljuština and others.

Stefan Novaković established himself as an independent printer of Serbian books, greatly benefiting from an ordinance prohibiting the import of Slavic books by Serbs who were themselves excluded from importing books and the publishing business. Kurzböck and Novaković books, which gained a deservedly high reputation, were bought in Serbian lands and communities throughout the Habsburg monarchy (and eventually the Balkan Peninsula) as a result of the Allgemeine Schul-Ordnung drafted by Johann Ignaz von Felbiger for the German-speaking part of the empire, including the Serbian (Illyrian) Military Confines. Also, these books and textbooks reached the schools of Banat and south Hungary. Both Novaković and Kurzböck employed Serbian typesetters and proofreaders, mainly young, educated men who came to study in Vienna and who were proficient in Slavonic-Serbian. Among themStefan Vujanovski who, after the death of Prince Dmitry Mikhailovich Golitsyn the Younger in Russia, returned to Vienna to find employment at the Serbian/Cyrillic court printing press. In 1786, Kurzböck employed Teodor Avramović as a proofreader, who previously worked as a teacher in his home town of Ruma. Avramović compiled the German-Serbian dictionary (1791).

In 1792 Novaković encouraged Jovan Rajić to publish Istorija raznih slovenskih narodov, najpače Bolgar, Horvatov i Serbov (The History of Various Slavic Peoples, especially of Bulgars, Croats and Serbs), the first systematic work on the history of Croats and Serbs, which was published in 1794 in four volumes. The "Serbskija novini povsednevnija", an irregularly issued newspaper (from March to December 1791), edited by Markides Pulja of Vienna, was also printed by Kurzböck press. When Novaković took over he started printing the influential newspaper of the time, "Slaveno-serbskija vjedomosti" (1792–1794). In 1792 after von Kurzböck died, he bought Kurzböck's Serbian (Illyrian) printing house with all proprietary rights and inventory. He donated a collection of all the Serbian books he had published to the Vienna Serbian Community which became a nucleus of the communal library. Strict Austrian censorship caused book sales to fall dramatically in 1794. In 1796 Novaković sold the press and monopoly rights to the Royal University of Pest (Eötvös Loránd University) then returned to his native Osijek, where he spent the rest of his days, and, as Pavel Josef Šafařík wrote that Novaković was still alive in 1815, while Johann Christian von Engel (1770–1814) wrote that Novaković died in 1803. In fact, Novaković lived until 1823. In addition to a journal and a booklet of commercial content in the Serbian language, he also anonymously issued -- "Dissertatio brevis et sincera auctoris Hungari de genta serba perperam Rasciana dicta ejusque meritis ac fatis in Hungaria cum appendice privi niorum eidem genti elargitorum". The Latin text was translated into German -- "Kurzgefasste Abhandlung über die Verdienste und Schicksale der serbischen aber racischen Nation in Hungarn, mit einem Anhange der derselben verliehenen Privilegien" (Concise treatise on the merits and destinies of the Serbian nation in Hungary, with an addition of the privileges conferred on them) and published.

== See also ==
- Atanasije Dimitrijević Sekereš
- Josef von Kurzböck
- Emanuilo Janković
- Damjan Kaulić
