= German–Serbian dictionary (1791) =

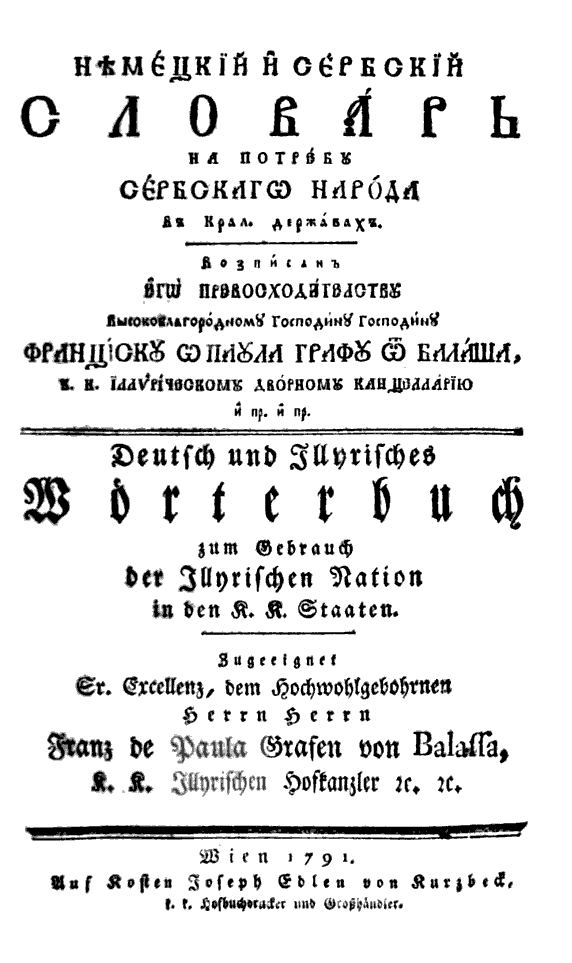
Title page of the Avramović Dictionary (1791 variant)

The 1791 German–Serbian dictionary, referred to as the Avramović Dictionary (Serbian: Аврамовићев речник or Avramovićev rečnik; full title in German: Deutsch und Illyrisches Wörterbuch zum Gebrauch der Illyrischen Nation in den K. K. Staaten; full title in Slavonic-Serbian: Нѣме́цкïй и̑ се́рбскïй слова́рь на потре́бꙋ се́рбскагѡ наро́да въ крал. держа́вахъ, transliterated as Něméckij i sérbskij slovár' na potrébu sérbskago naróda v kral. deržávah, meaning "German and Serbian Dictionary for Use by the Serbian People in the Royal States"), is a historical bidirectional translation dictionary published in the Habsburg Empire's capital of Vienna in 1791, though 1790 is given as the year of publication in some of its copies. Containing around 20,000 headwords in each direction, it is the largest Serbian dictionary of the 18th century. Vuk Karadžić possibly used it as a source for his Serbian Dictionary, which first appeared in 1818 as the first book in modern literary Serbian.

The Avramović Dictionary translates between Slavonic-Serbian, which was the dominant literary language of Serbs at the time, and German, which had been a subject in Serb schools in the Habsburg Empire since 1753. Teodor Avramović adapted Jacob Rodde's German–Russian dictionary published in 1784 in Leipzig. Avramović was a proofreader at the Cyrillic printing house of Josef von Kurzböck, who published the German–Serbian dictionary. The vernacular Serbian used in the dictionary reflects a dialect of the Serbs in Vojvodina.

== Background ==
At the beginning of the 18th century, the principal literary language of the Serbs was Church Slavonic of the Serbian recension or Serbo-Slavonic, with centuries-old tradition. By the mid-18th century, it had been mostly replaced with Russo-Slavonic (Church Slavonic of the Russian recension) among the Serbs in the Habsburg Empire. A linguistic blend of Russo-Slavonic, vernacular Serbian, and Russian—called Slavonic-Serbian— became the dominant language of Serbian secular publications during the 1780s and 1790s. A German–Slavonic-Serbian dictionary was composed in the 1730s in Karlovci, with around 1,100 headwords. The last notable work in Slavonic-Serbian was published in 1825.

Since 1750, German had been steadily replacing Latin as the official language in the Habsburg Empire. In Serbian schools, German began to be taught on 1 October 1753 in Karlovci. A knowledge of that language was especially important for those Serbs who sought a career in the imperial bureaucracy, the army, or commerce. A German grammar in Slavonic-Serbian appeared in 1772, adapted by Stefan Vujanovski. The book also contained a dictionary with around 4,500 headwords. Two years later, Sava Lazarević wrote a textbook for learning German, with a dictionary of around 1,600 headwords. This dictionary would be published as a separate book titled Рѣчникъ малый (Little Dictionary) in 1793, and it was reprinted in 1802, 1806, 1814, 1823, and 1837.

The 1772 grammar and the 1774 textbook were printed in Vienna by Austrian publisher and bookseller Joseph Kurzböck. He established his Cyrillic printing house in 1770, and Empress Maria Theresia granted him a monopoly on printing and importing Cyrillic books. The empress sanctioned a Cyrillic press in Vienna to reduce the massive importation of Russian books requested by the Serbian Orthodox Church and schools. The Habsburg court had repeatedly rejected the Serbs' petitions to found their own printing houses. In 1786, Kurzböck employed Teodor Avramović as a proofreader, who previously worked as a teacher in his home town of Ruma.

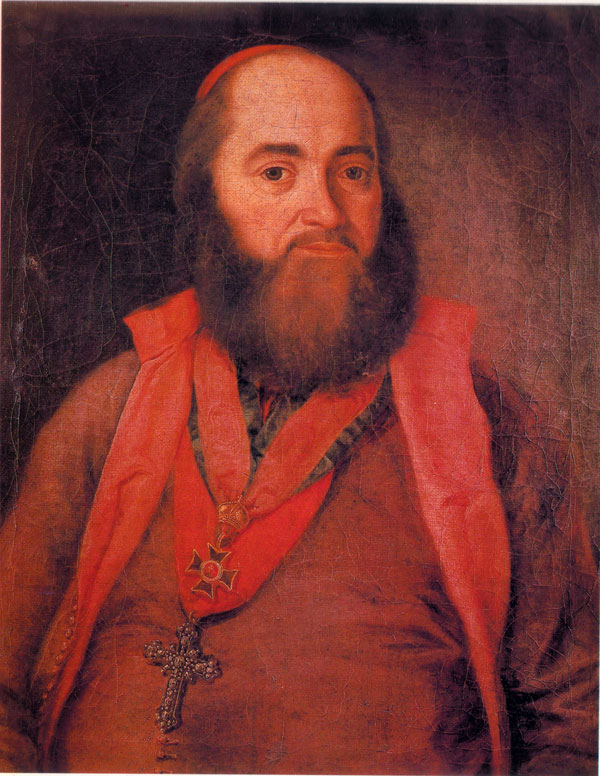
Mojsije Putnik, the Serbian Orthodox Metropolitan of Karlovci (1781–1790)

Between 1779 and 1785, there was an intensive campaign in the Habsburg Empire to eliminate the Cyrillic script and the Church Slavonic language from Serbian schools and secular publications. The Cyrillic script was to be replaced with the Latin alphabet, and the "Illyrian language" that was used in Croatian schools was to replace Church Slavonic. This campaign eventually failed as it was effectively resisted by Serb educational and religious authorities, including the Metropolitan of Karlovci, Mojsije Putnik. The term "Illyrian" was used in the Habsburg Empire to refer to any South Slavic peoples or to the South Slavs in general, though in the 18th century, non-Slavic Habsburg officials associated it primarily with Serbs.

== Production and usage ==
After an agreement with Metropolitan Putnik, Joseph Kurzböck undertook the project of producing a German dictionary for the Serbian people. The quickest and least costly way to do that was to adapt an existing work. At that time, highly regarded as the German–Russian bidirectional dictionary composed by Jacob Rodde in Riga and printed in 1784 in Leipzig. Kurzbeck entrusted his proofreader Teodor Avramović with the job of adapting Jacob Rodde's work into Slavonic-Serbian. Avramović was helped by Atanasije Dimitrijević Sekereš, the censor of the Cyrillic books installed by the Habsburg court in 1772. Sekereš began composing his Slavonic-Serbian dictionary in 1775, using five Russian dictionaries as sources, but he later abandoned that work.

The printing of the Avramović Dictionary began at the end of 1789. In February 1790, Kurzböck requested and received Metropolitan Putnik's permission to dedicate the book to him. After the metropolitan died on 9 July 1790, Kurzböck stopped its printing. Emanuilo Janković, whose petition to found a Serbian printing house in Novi Sad was rejected, criticized the dictionary and Kurzböck's Cyrillic production in general; he owned a press in Leipzig. The new Metropolitan of Karlovci, Stefan Stratimirović, was elected in November 1790, and he approved the dictionary at Kurzböck's request. Its printing was then resumed and completed in the first half of May 1791. Kurzböck sent a copy to Count Francis Balassa, the head of the Illyrian Court Chancellery, which was a Habsburg ministry focused primarily on the Serbs. Kurzbeck requested and received Balassa's permission to include a dedication to him and his portrait in the dictionary. The book appeared at the end of July 1791; its price was 7 florins and 30 kreutzers.

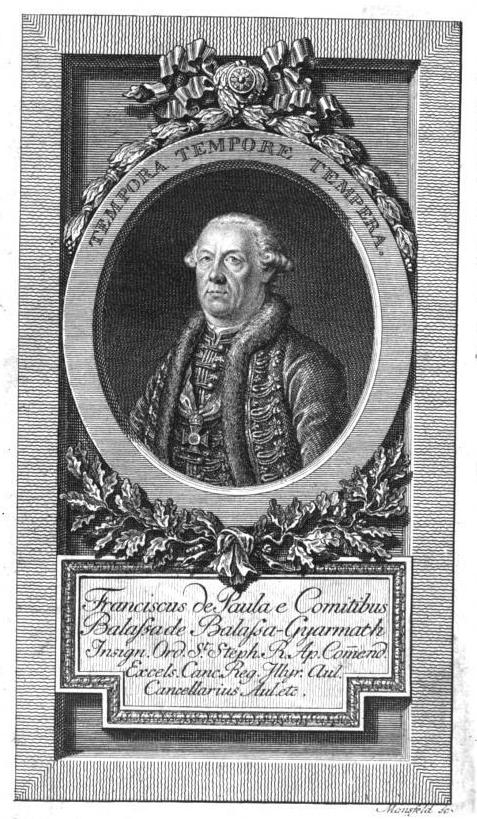
Count Francis Balassa's engraving in the Avramović Dictionary

Balassa sent a copy to Stratimirović recommending the book, and the metropolitan informed the eparchies under his jurisdiction about its publication. It was bought by students, priests, scholars, merchants, and other people, mostly in Vienna, Budapest, Novi Sad, Osijek, and Oradea, where Avramović was the district inspector for Serbian and Romanian schools from 1792 until his death in 1806. In 1792, Stefan von Novaković bought Kurzböck's Cyrillic press and warehouse of books. When he sold them to the Pest University Press in 1795, there were 360 unsold copies of the Avramović Dictionary in the warehouse. The book was listed in the university's sale catalogs until 1829. It was part of the library of Sava Tekelija, who wrote additional entries in his copy. The first edition of Vuk Karadžić's Serbian Dictionary appeared in 1818 as the first book in modern literary Serbian, based on the Eastern Herzegovinian dialect. There are indications that Karadžić used the Avramović Dictionary as a source for his work.

In 2002, the Austrian National Library hosted an exhibition titled "The Serbian Book in Vienna 1741–1900", prepared by the Library of Matica Srpska with the help of the National Library of Serbia. Among 212 exhibited publications, there were 28 of those printed by Kurzböck, one of which was the Avramović Dictionary. Between 1770 and 1792, Kurzböck printed 151 Serbian publications, including textbooks, religious books, philosophical, literary, and other works, by authors such as Jovan Rajić, Jovan Muškatirović, Aleksije Vezilić, Dositej Obradović, Zaharije Orfelin, and Pavle Julinac.

== Description ==
The Avramović Dictionary is the largest Serbian dictionary of the 18th century. Printed in the octavo format, it contains 1045 pages of lexical text divided into two separately paginated parts. The first part is a German–Slavonic-Serbian dictionary titled Deutsch–Illyrisches Wörterbuch (German–Illyrian Dictionary), consisting of 719 pages. The second part is a Slavonic-Serbian–German dictionary titled Славено-Сербскïй Леѯïконъ (Slavonic-Serbian Lexicon), consisting of 326 pages. Either part has approximately 20,000 headwords; the first part has more pages as its entries are larger and more detailed.

By the time of its publication in July 1791, the book had been printed in four variants, differing only in front matter. In the first two variants, 1790 is given as the year of publication, and in the other two variants, it is 1791. The 1790 variants have two title pages, one in Slavonic-Serbian (folio 1 verso), and the other in German (folio 2 recto). The earlier of these variants contain a dedication to Metropolitan Mojsije Putnik composed by Kurzböck, while the other variant has no dedication. The 1791 variants have one title page (folio 2 recto) with both the Slavonic-Serbian and the German version of the title. The preceding page (folio 1 verso) contains a copperplate engraving depicting Count Francis Balassa, and these two variants differ only in some details of the engraving. After the title page comes a dedication to Balassa, composed by Kurzböck in the tone of humble devotion. All variants have the same foreword written by Kurzböck, while none of them mentions Jacob Rodde as the source or Teodor Avramović as the editor of the dictionary. Only Kurzbeck is mentioned as its publisher. Its source and editor have been identified respectively by Samuel Linde at the beginning of the 19th century and Pavel Jozef Šafárik in 1865, since when the book has been referred to as the Avramović Dictionary.

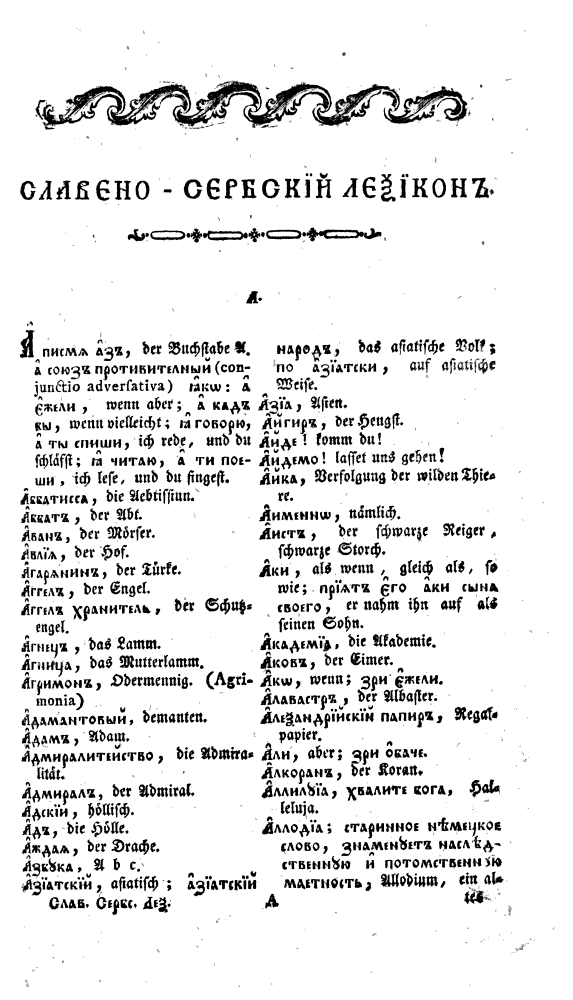
Page 1 of the 2nd part of the dictionary, titled Slavonic-Serbian Lexicon

Its German component is practically identical to that of Rodde's dictionary. The latter's German–Russian part is based on the German–Latin–Russian dictionary published by the Saint Petersburg Academy of Sciences in 1731. Rodde added stress marks and grammatical notes on Russian words. The academy's dictionary is created through adding a Russian component to the German–Latin part of the Lexicon bipartitum Latino–Germanicum et Germanico–Latinum, written by Ehrenreich Weismann and first published in 1673 in Stuttgart; it had eleven more editions. Besides lexemes of the educated German language, Weismann's Lexicon also contains regionalisms and archaisms. Its entries often include compounds of the headword; e.g., Landstrasse and Holzstrasse are found s.v. Strasse. Polysemes are entered as separate headwords accompanied by a disambiguating remark; thus, four senses of the noun Frucht (fruit) are found s.v. Frucht (Baum), Frucht oder Nutz, Frucht (vom Acker), and Frucht des Leibes. Usage of headwords is illustrated with phrases, idioms, and collocations, and the Lexicon contains many proverbs and sayings.

The Serbian component of the Avramović Dictionary reflects the contemporary condition of the literary language of the Serbs—a blend of Church Slavonic, vernacular Serbian, and Russian. While Rodde's work uses the civil version of Cyrillic, introduced in Russia by Peter the Great, the Avramović Dictionary uses an old ecclesiastical type of the script, including the archaic letters ѕ, ѡ, ꙗ, ѧ, and ѵ. Many Russian terms are copied from Rodde verbatim or with a small modification, especially those used in areas with which the Serbs were not very familiar at the time. Serbian vernacular terms predominate in some areas, such as armament and trade; there are also common Serbian expressions like а̑йдемо (ajdemo, "let's go"). A number of Russian words in Rodde are replaced by Avramović with their Russo-Slavonic equivalents. An example of the entries dominated by vernacular Serbian terminology is that under the headword Nadel (needle), in which only one word is taken from Russian, магнитнаѧ, meaning "magnetic":

Nadel, (die) zum Nähen ("needle, for sewing"), и̑гла; Nädelchen, (das) ("little needle") и̑глица; eine Nadel einfädeln ("to thread a needle)", оу̑дети конацъ оу̑ и̑глу; zu Nadel gehörig ("which belongs to a needle"), игленый; Nadel zum Spicken ("larding needle"), коі̑омсе оу̑бада сланина оу̑ месо; Magnetnadel ("magnetic needle"), и̑гла магнитнаѧ; Stecknadel ("pin"), чïода.

In the second part of the dictionary, the copied Russian headwords are often accompanied by their Serbian equivalents; e.g., under the headword очки (glasses), "о̑чки, наочари, die Augengläser". In entries of the first part, Russian and Serbian forms complement each other; so the headword schwarz (black) is translated with the Russian черный, and in the same entry, the verb schwärzen (blacken) is translated with the Serbian поцрнити. German proverbs and sayings are interpreted with their Serbian counterparts. Thus, s.v. Schnitt, a German phrase meaning "he made a good profit from it" is interpreted with a popular Serbian saying, пала мꙋ сикира оу̑ медъ pala mu sikira u med (his axe fell into honey). Phonologically, morphologically, and lexically, vernacular Serbian used in the Avramović Dictionary reflects a dialect of the Serbs of Vojvodina. It also exhibits some archaic grammatical traits, and the usage of aorist is more common than in modern Serbian. The everyday language of the Vojvodina Serbs was enriched in the 18th century with loanwords from German. Some of those found in the dictionary are also part of modern literary Serbian, such as торта (torta, torte), харинга (haringa, herring), шꙋпа (šupa, shed), паръ (par, pair), нꙋла (nula, zero), цицъ (cic, fine printed calico), and баïонетъ (bajonet, bayonet).
