= Pavel Kengelac =

Serbian writer, polyglot, scientist and cleric

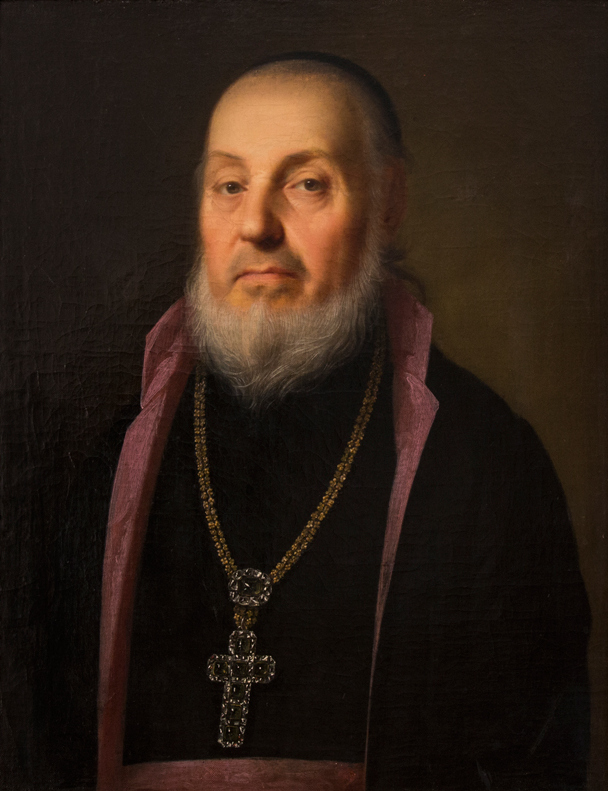

Pavle Kengelac or Pavel Kengelac (Velika Kikinda, Habsburg Empire, 29 June 1763 - Sveti Đurađ monastery, Habsburg Empire, now part of Romanian Banat, 7 March 1834) was a Serbian writer, polyglot, scientist, cleric and one of the few proponents of Slaveno-Serbian instead of the Serbian that was being reformed at the time. He was one of the leaders of the Serbian revival in the 18th century, begun by Dositej Obradović, Zaharije Orfelin, Pavle Julinac, Jovan Rajić, and continued by Milovan Vidaković.

== Biography ==
Pavle Kengelac traces his family roots to the legendary founder of Kikinda—military frontier captain Risto Kengelac. Pavle's father Hristofor and mother Jevrosima were all born in the Pomorisje region, better known as krajina. Pavle Kengelac studied at the Evangelical Lyceum in Bratislava and Kežmarok where his professors were philosophers and scholars Ján Juraj Strečko, mathematician and physicist Stefan Sabel and historian Stefan Fabri. That Protestant school nurtured religious tolerance and offered a broad cameralist education as well the study of Latin, German, Hungarian and Slaveno-Serbian (Russian Slavonic) languages, grammar, rhetorics, mathematics, physics, natural science, geography, history, and philosophy. In 1790 Kengelac enrolled at the theological seminary in the Alexander Nevsky Lavra (later called Saint Petersburg Theological Academy) and from there went to the University of Halle where his teachers included August Hermann Niemeyer, Johann Salomo Semler, Friedrich Albrecht Carl Gren, Johann August Nosselt and Johann Augustus Eberhard. He was awarded the doctor of laws at the inauguration ceremonies in 1794, together with a sword as a gift from Frederick William III of Prussia. He returned to his homeland and opened a law practice.

It was a time when there were a few vociferous folks on both sides such as Vuk Karadžić advocating a purely popular language and Pavle Kengelac favoring a complete acceptance of Slavonic-Serbian, then in literary use, and those in the middle who sought to "reform", though in a compromising manner. Kengelac was a composite of Hungarian Serbian merchant, intellectual with an international education (Germany and Russia) in natural science, law, theology, and astronomy. He became an Archimandrite later in life.

After Kengelac wrote about Astronomy in "Estestvoslovie" (Natural History; Buda, 1811), poet Eustahija Arsić dedicated a part of her Poleznaya Razmislyenye o cetirih Godisnih Vremeneh (Useful Reflections on the Four Seasons) to Astronomy.

Geographical investigations in the territory of Vojvodina had a rather early start. Among the first concerned with her geography may be noticed Pavle Kengelac, a natural scientist and historian, who studied abroad. His main work Estestvoslovie contains many valuable elements of interest for the scientific geographical field.

One of the few intellectuals of his day, the Serbian Archimandrite of the Sveti Đurađ monastery, then part of the Habsburg Empire, Pavle Kengelac, adhered to the ideology of enlightenment and deism as the prevailing philosophy of the 18th century. It is known that the aim of this philosophy was to reconcile contemporary scientific achievements with the official theology. This movement resulted from the intensive study of nature and its phenomena, so it included a broad circle of scientists of that time and acquired a very broad range of followers. Archimandrite Kengelac expressed his adherence to this movement in his work Jestestvoslovije (Natural History) published in Buda in 1811. Kengelac's work faced resistance in the top circles of the Metropolitanate of Karlovci, including the Metropolitan himself, Stefan Stratimirović. One of the many reasons for that was insidiousness and personal animosity of the mentioned Metropolitan towards the man who wanted 'to be recognized'; even more important reasons were the activities of the conservative top circles of the Austrian state administration and of the Vienna Court itself, as well as the Metropolitan Stratimirović's fear to arouse anger in these circles and fall into disgrace himself.

== Works ==
Kengelac is best known for his Estestvoslovie (Buda, 1811) and Vsemirnago sbytijaslovija: cast' pervija (Buda, 1821). He also wrote many pamphlets and articles in newspapers.
