= Nemenikuće =

Nemenikuće Неменикуће
- Village
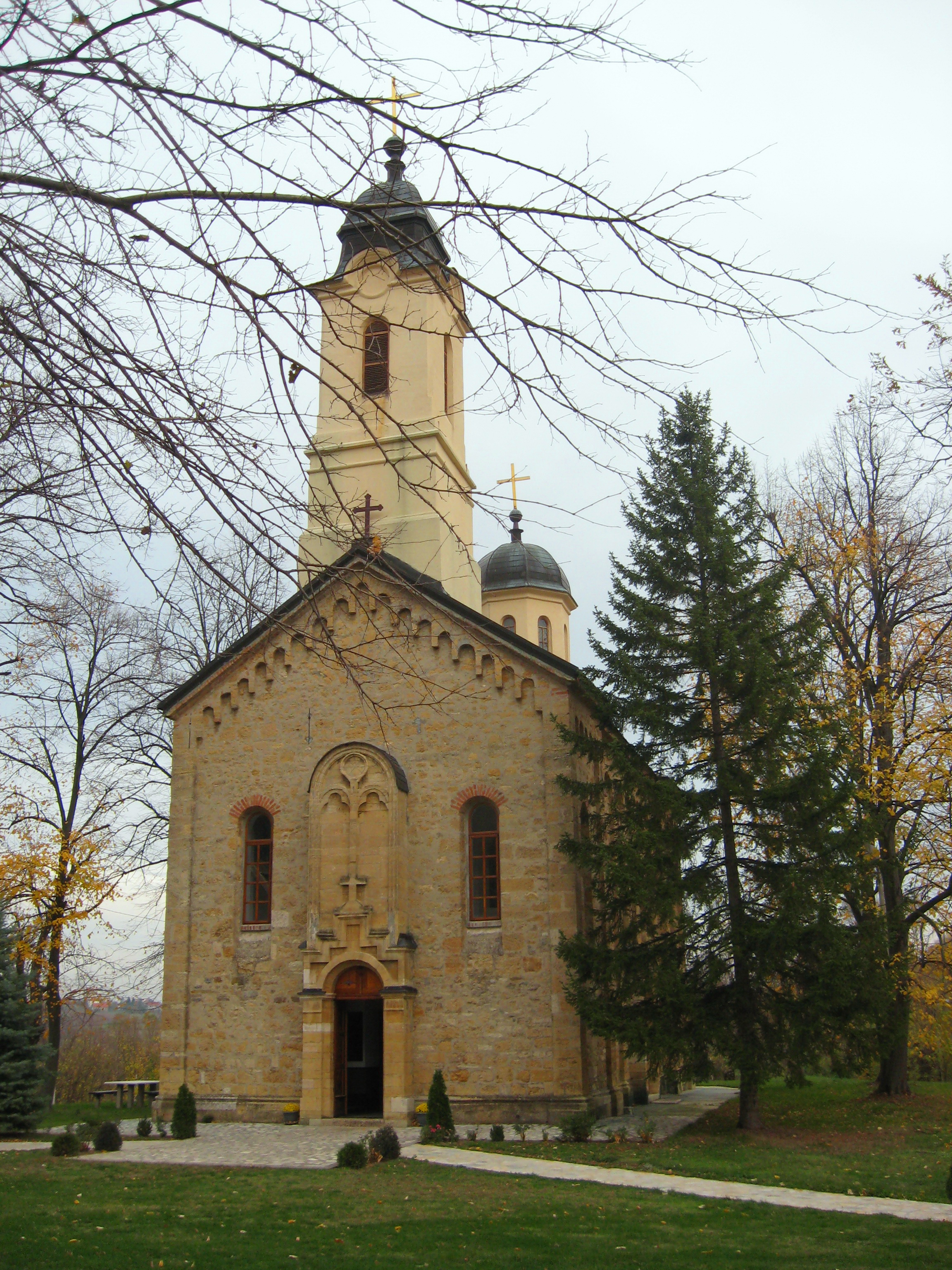
- The Church of Saint Apostles Peter and Paul

- Location within Serbia
- Coordinates: 44°29′N 20°35′E
- Country: Serbia
- District: Belgrade District
- City Municipality: Sopot
- Local community: Nemenikuće

Population (2022)
  - Total: ▼1,833
- Time zone: UTC+1 (CET)
  - Summer (DST): UTC+2 (CEST)

Historical population
Year	Pop.	±%
1948	2,414	—
1953	2,464	+2.1%
1961	2,400	−2.6%
1971	2,161	−10.0%
1981	1,999	−7.5%
1991	1,933	−3.3%
2002	2,058	+6.5%
2011	1,992	−3.2%

Nemenikuće (Serbian Cyrillic: Неменикуће) is a village in the Sopot City municipality, in the suburban area of Belgrade, Serbia. It had a population of 1833 by the 2022 census. It is located on the slopes of the Kosmaj mountain.

== Name ==
The origin of the unusual name is not known for sure and none of the theories can be confirmed through historiography. Couple of theories revolve around the anecdotal historical events in which the phrase nema ni kuće ("[there is] not a [single] house) was uttered. Another possibility is the Celtic-Serbian coinage from nemen, Celtic for glade (geography), and kuća, Serbian for house.

The name is also grammatically problematic. Even the inhabitants are not sure whether to treat it as a singular or plural, or what is the proper declension of the name in grammatical cases, so they use various versions.

== History ==
First written records of the village date from the first half of the 18th century. In 1732 it was said that it had 16 houses. The oldest family in the village were the Vidaković family, which included Serbian novelist Milovan Vidaković. In memory of him, an annual festival "Days of Milovan Vidaković" is held.

== Characteristics ==
The village consists of three hamlets: Centar, Tresije and Bakčine. One of the landmarks in the village is the Old Žujović House. Though placed under the state protection, it is not in a good shape. House with 4 rooms, a fireplace at the entrance and a doksat (porch), was a home of a local Turkish pasha. Prince of Serbia, Miloš Obrenović, later gave the house to the Žujović family, which included the first Serbian geologist Jovan Žujović.

== Church of Saint Apostles Peter and Paul ==
The Church of Saint Apostles Peter and Paul was built from 1864 to 1868, under the supervision of Nastas Naumović. It was built on the location of the former Church of the Presentation of the Blessed Virgin Mary, which was built and demolished several times. During the Great migration of Serbs in 1690, Patriarch Arsenije III Čarnojević held one of the last services in this church, before crossing the Sava and Danube into Austria. Before engaging the Ottomans in the Siege of Belgrade in 1806 during the First Serbian Uprising, insurrection leader Karađorđe and his rebels received a Eucharist here.

On the church floor there are two tombstones, with inscriptions, skulls and crossed bones. They are the graves of Vićentije Petrović, a local knez of Grocka and participant in the First Serbian Uprising. Other belongs to his son, Jovan Vićentijević, captain of Kosmaj. The tombstones were part of the old church but were preserved and brought into the new one after 1864.

Kleopatra's drinking fountain is located in the churchyard. Kleopatra Karađorđević (1835-55) was a Serbian princess, daughter of Prince Alexander Karađorđević and Princess consort Persida Nenadović. She died at the age of 19 and when her body was transported from Belgrade to Topola for the burial, the entourage spent a night in the old church. During the night, local girls weaved the shroud for the young princess. Touched by this, her parents donated the drinking fountain to the church.

Construction of the auxiliary church building started in 2010s, but it wasn't finished. It was planned to serve as a museum for art church artifacts. Plans are being made for building of another church, dedicated to Saint Petka. In the wider village area are two monasteries, Tresije and Kastaljan.

== Economy ==
Though there are several small industrial objects, the settlement is predominantly agricultural with the livestock breeding especially being developed.

== In popular culture ==
Author Milovan Glišić wrote about Nemenikuće in his story Redak zver ("A rare animal"). TV serials Greh njene majke and Ravna Gora were filmed in the village in 2009 and 2012, respectively.

== Notable people ==
- Milovan Vidaković (1780-1841), novelist
- Jovan Žujović (1856-1936), geologist; grew up in the village
- Miloš Vasić (1859-1935), general
