= Srpski rječnik =

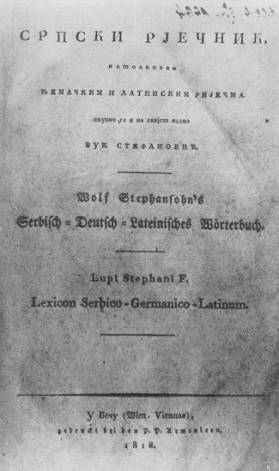
Front cover of Srpski rječnik, first edition.

Srpski rječnik (Serbian Cyrillic: Српски рјечник, pronounced [sr̩̂pskiː rjê̞ːtʃniːk], The Serbian Dictionary; full name: Српски рјечник истолкован њемачким и латинским ријечма, "The Serbian Dictionary, paralleled with German and Latin words") is a dictionary written by Vuk Stefanović Karadžić, first published in 1818. It is the first known dictionary of the reformed Serbian language.

== Development ==
Karadžić began collecting words of the Serbian vernacular in 1815, as suggested by Slovene linguist Jernej Kopitar. While working in court during his time in Serbia, he had a habit of "writing down an interesting word or two". The first published edition of the dictionary came out in 1818, and contained 26.270 words which Karadžić had heard in the common speech. His source could also have been the Avramović Dictionary. Karadžić's dictionary itself was one of the most important steps in his struggle for the Serbian language and grammar because it stated that the pure vernacular should provide the basis for a main literary language. Also reviewed in the dictionary were phonetic changes, later being a part of the Grammar of the Serbian language, which was later merged with the dictionary and translated by Jacob Grimm into German in 1824, while the dictionary itself was translated into Latin and German by Jernej Kopitar.

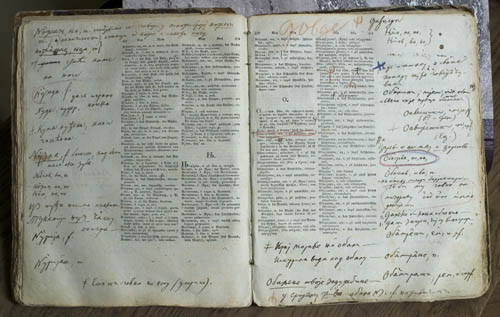
Original with Vuk's notes.

While being officially completed in 1816, the dictionary could not yet be published for a number of reasons, mainly due to the lack of resources and therefore means to print the dictionaries. While at the time there were no printing presses present in Serbia, printing such a work in Austria required the permission of Metropolitan Stefan Stratimirović, who saw Karadžić's work in orthography as a threat to the Serbian Orthodox Church and its habits of educating Serbs with the so-called Slavonic-Serbian language, an adaptation of the Church Slavonic language.

Karadžić had also implemented the use of new, reformed letters within the dictionary. These included Ј, Љ, Њ, Ђ, Ћ and Џ. Words including the letter Х, which Karadžić insisted be used with foreign words only, did not appear in the first edition of the dictionary. However, Karadžić was later persuaded by Lukijan Mušicki and Pavle Solarić that the letter be used in some words, however "Х" was never attributed in the dictionary as a starting letter, and no words beginning with "Х" were included.

== Criticism ==
The dictionary was sharply criticized and attacked by opponents of the language reform, a strong motive for this being the large amount of swear words present in the dictionary, which were included partly due to Kopitar's and Grimm's persuasions. Jacob Grimm showed a distinct interest in profanity within the Serbian language and in his correspondence with Karadžić he requested their equivalent in German. Attacks held against the dictionary did not cease even after 1847, which was considered to be the year of victory for Karadžić's reforms.
