= Milovan Vidaković =

Serbian writer (1780–1841)

Milovan Vidaković Милован Видаковић
- Милован Видаковић
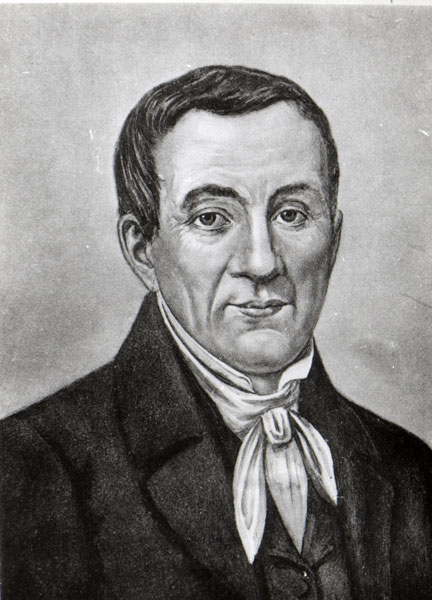
- Born: May 1780; Nemenikuće, Serbia (then Ottoman Empire)
- Died: October 28, 1841 (aged 61); Pest, Hungary
- Resting place: Budapest
- Occupation: novelist
- Writing career
- Language: Slaveno-Serbian

Milovan Vidaković (Serbian: Милован Видаковић; 1780–1841) was a Serbian novelist. He is referred to as the father of the modern Serbian novel. Today, his novels are mostly forgotten, and he is best remembered as a strong opponent of Vuk Karadžić's language reform and a proponent of the Slavonic-Serbian language as a literary language of Serbs.

== Biography ==
=== Early life ===
Milovan Vidaković was born in May 1780 in the village of Nemenikuće, in the Kosmaj area of Serbia. For generations the ancestors of Vidaković had been haiduks, and he himself would have joined the armed freedom-fighters had his father not entrusted him to the care of Momir Vidaković, an uncle, in Irig. When he was nine, his father took Milovan to Irig in the Srem region of the Vojvodina, because of the outbreak of hostilities between the Austro-Russian alliance and the Ottoman Turks in the War of 1787–91.

Vidaković started school in Irig and then continued to further his education at Temesvár, Novi Sad, Szeged, and Késmárk. He studied at the Piarists' Gymnasium in Szeged, the capital of the county of Csongrád in Hungary. His education involved the traditional study of Church Slavonic, Greek and Latin classics together with philosophy and philology in a modern atmosphere of rationalism. Later, at the Piarist College in Késmárk, Hungary, he made rapid progress, especially in jurisprudence, though preferring the study of languages (Latin, German, French), history, literature, judicial science and philosophy. Public education was the career which seemed to lie open to Vidaković after he graduated from the Evangelical Lyceum in Késmárk.

=== Career ===
In 1814 in Budapest, Vidaković published the first volume of "Ljubomir u Jelisijumu" (Ljubomir in Elisium), inspired by Jean-Jacques Rousseau's Emile, or On Education. Like his previous novels, this was an adventure story, with the usual sentimental, moral-didactic digressions. The volume is remarkable, however, for the twenty-page introductory essay, "Observation on the Serbian Language," dated October 1813. The opening statement suggests that the author was aware of the articles on the Serbian literary language published by Jernej Kopitar in the German press. "Now we who begin to write a little for our people find ourselves in rather unpleasant times; they criticize us more for our language than for our work, but they are right too; it is the duty of the translator, as well as the writer himself, to pay as much attention to his language as to the thing he is expressing in it."

Vidaković has been generally described by critics of his opus as a solitary figure, out of harmony with the spirit of his time and often directly opposed to it. Yet in the context of social conditions of his time, and of the studies then flourishing, he appears as having been thoroughly in touch with them. The new spirit among the Serbs of Vojvodina that took hold then was known as Dositejism, coined after Dositej Obradović, who became popular among his people for criticizing the Serbian Orthodox Church hierarchy for their old-fashioned ways. His views had been espoused by most intellectuals but were bitterly opposed by the Orthodox hierarchy, especially after the accession of Stefan Stratimirović as Metropolitan Bishop of Karlovci in 1790. Serbian literary critic Pavle Popović outlines Dositejism thus:

What he [Dositej Obradović] preached became common property, the spirit of the times. With his common sense writings, he opened the way of enlightenment, literature, and national education, and the whole Serbian society in Hungary and Austria of that time followed the slogans he gave. 'Education, education, that is what we need,' was the constant motto from then on; education in all its forms: schools, printing houses, books... Literature is the most important; it needs the most help, it spreads education more freely and directly than the public school, especially the Latin schools that Serbian students were attending at the time... Every educated man and patriot must help literature; everyone who can write carefully must write, because that is what the people especially need.

— Popović (1934), pp. 9–10, 23, 24

The desire to help the Serbian people was the motive that Vidaković gave for writing his first work, a biblical adaptation called "Istorija o prekrasnom Josifu" (The Story of Beautiful Joseph). In the deduction to this novel in verse, first published in 1805, Vidaković wrote: "It is that common sense demands from us that each one, as much as his God-given strength and talent permit, should be of use, in some way to his fellow-man, and especially to his race, from such an obligation I, loving my Serbian race, compose for the youth this 'Story About Beautiful Joseph' in verse."

Vidaković, though always as a kind of outsider, attached himself more or less to the Romantic movement during that transitional period of Rationalism towards Romanticism and the years immediately preceding and following it, and was stimulated by this movement both to drama and to novel-writing.

Even Atanasije Stojković, who was several years older than Vidaković and had begun writing novels earlier, has at times been described by literary historians as influenced by Vidaković’s work rather than the reverse. Vidaković’s eight novels achieved considerable popularity among Serbian readers and were widely read within Slavic literary circles during the period, though later assessments of their literary significance have varied. His writing reflected the contemporary popularity of romantic and historical fiction, including the influence of authors such as Walter Scott, and was noted for its stylistic qualities and appeal to readers of the time. Works including Usamljeni junoša and Ljubomir have been cited by scholars as examples of his influence on the development of early modern Serbian prose literature.

In 1836, Vidaković published his translation from German of "Djevica iz Marijenburga" (Das Madchen von Marienburg), a drama in five acts by Franz Kratter (1758–1830), dedicated to Marko Karamata, one of the students he was tutoring. The main character Chatinka, the maid of Marienburg, came originally from Poland, but she had been abducted by Russian troops and now found herself at the summer palace of Peter the Great, the Peterhof, outside of St. Petersburg. Kratter himself had been one of the most ardent advocates of Josephinism, like Dositej Obradović among the Serbs in Vojvodina. And it would have been obvious to the readers in 1836 that the drama's reflections on Peter the Great were also relevant to the people under the Habsburgs. Vidaković's translation of Kratter's drama suggests how dear Vidaković held his tenets of freedom for all people, not only the Serbs. Vidaković often read Kratter's well-publicized quotation: "Absolute monarchies are but one step away from despotism. Despotism and Enlightenment: let anyone who can try to reconcile these two. I can't."

Vidaković's fame rests on the first Serbian novel, "Usamljeni junoša" (A Forlorn Youth), which he modeled after German romances and the philosophic-pedagogical novels then extremely popular throughout the Austrian Empire and Germany. Coming under the influence of Romanticism, Vidaković took an interest in the history of his people whose lands were then occupied by two empires (Habsburg Germans and the Ottoman Turks) and by so doing gave a historical framework to all his subsequent works. Literary critic Jovan Skerlić wrote: "All his novels have many historical elements, and his contemporaries called him 'the Serbian Walter Scott.'"

== Vidaković and the language reform ==
At the beginning of the nineteenth century, the Serbian people, like the rest of the Slavs, Hungarians, Italians, and Romanians living under the Habsburg rule, became engaged in a dual struggle for political and cultural independence. Chief Serbian cultural revolutionary was Vuk Karadžić, a minor government official in the Karadjordje administration who had fled to Vienna in 1813 after the breakup of the First Serbian Uprising. Vuk argued a campaign to free Serbian literature from its thralldom to Slavonic-Serbian, based on Church Slavonic, an important idiom that Serbs had been using in their secular and religious works for a century. There were a few extremists on both sides, such as Karadžić himself advocating a purely spoken language and Pavel Kengelac favoring a complete acceptance of Russo-Slavonic, but most writers seem to have been moderate, who sought to improve and standardize their spoken language by retaining the particular features of Russo-Slavonic that they individually espoused. Their mixed but predominantly vernacular language was called Slavonic-Serbian. Vidaković was a proponent of the Slavonic-Serbian as a literary language, unlike Karadžić, who proposed a simplified alphabet and a new literary language based exclusively on spoken Serbian. Karadžić's program was first derided and then bitterly opposed by Church-led conservatives and others who wished to preserve some bond between the new Serbian literary language and Slavo-Serbian. The ensuing struggle became so fierce that Đuro Daničić named it "The War for a Serbian Language and Orthography." In the midst of it all were writers like Vidaković who had the misfortune to put their theories on language into print at about the same time that Karadžić and Daničić were beginning their reforms.

== Works ==
- Istorija o prekrasnom Josifu (epic, 1805)
- Usamljeni junoša ("A Forlorn Youth", novel, 1810)
- Velimir i Bosiljka (novel, 1811)
- Ljubomir u Jelisijumu ("Ljubomir in Jelisium", novel in three volumes, 1814, 1817, 1823)
- Mladi Tovija ("Young Tobias", story in verses, 1825)
- Kasija Carica ("Casia the Empress", novel, 1827)
- Siloan i Milena Srpkinja u Engleskoj ("Siloan and Milena the Serb in England", novel, 1829)
- Ljubezna scena u veselom dvoru Ive Zagorice, (historic story, 1834)
- Putešestvije u Jerusalim ("Voyage to Jerusalem", epic, 1834)
- Gramatika srpska ("Serbian Grammatic", 1838)
- Pesan istoričeska o Sv. Đorđu ("Historic Poem on St. George", 1839)
- Selim i Merima (unfinished novel, 1839)

== Sources ==
- Skerlić, Jovan (1914). Историја нове српске књижевности [History of New Serbian Literature] (in Serbian). Belgrade: Prosveta.
- Popović, Pavle (1934). Milovan Vidaković. Belgrade: Geca Kon.
- Selimović, Meša (1990). Za i protiv Vuka [Pro et Contra Vuk] (in Serbo-Croatian). Belgrade: BIGZ, Svejtlost. ISBN 86-13-00429-6.
- Čalija, Jelena (2010). "Човек-дете српског романа" [Man-child of Serbian novel]. Politikin Zabavnik (in Serbian) (3064). Archived from the original on 2015-07-10.
