= Sopot, Belgrade =

Sopot Сопот (Serbian)
- Municipality
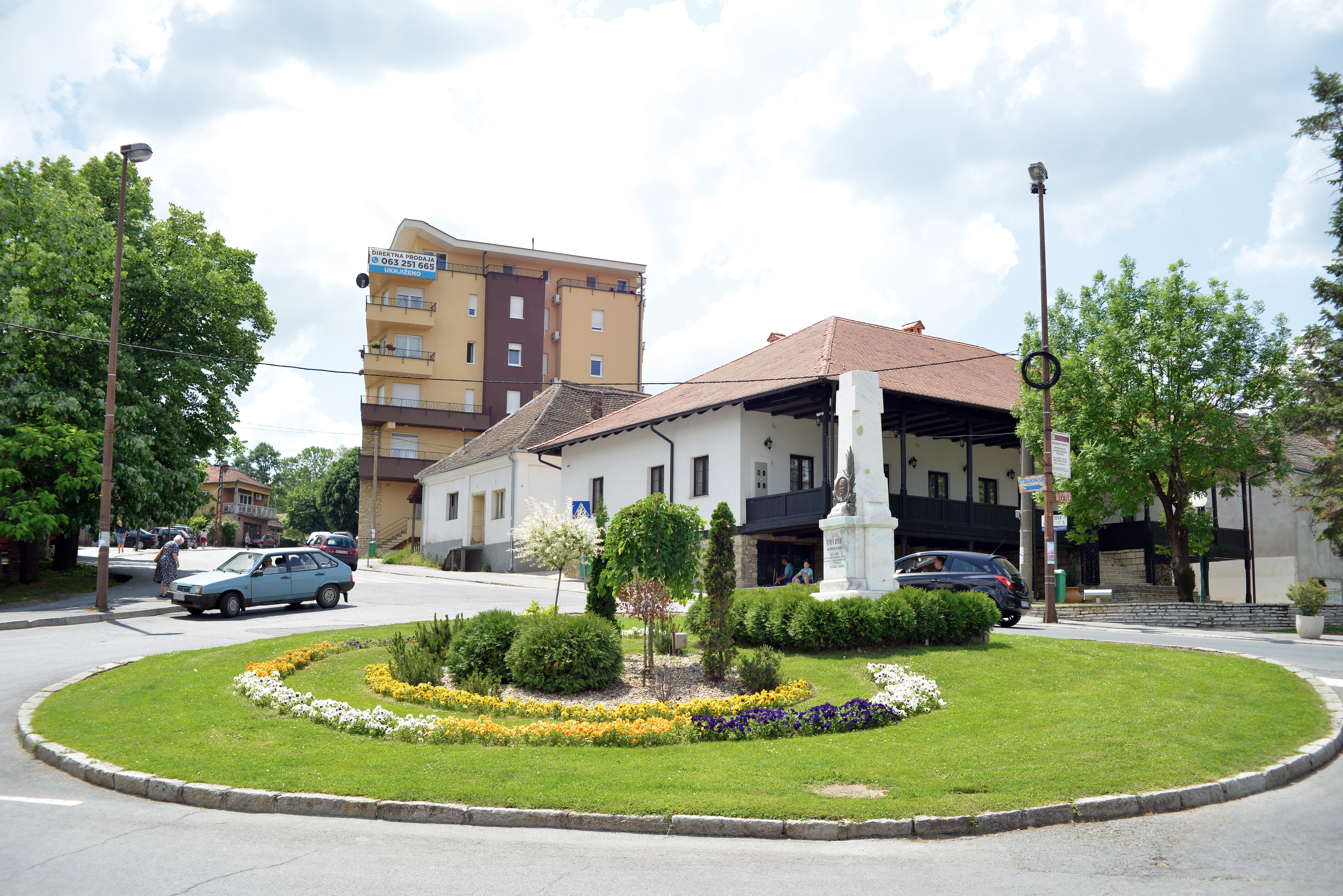
- Sopot town center

- Coat of arms

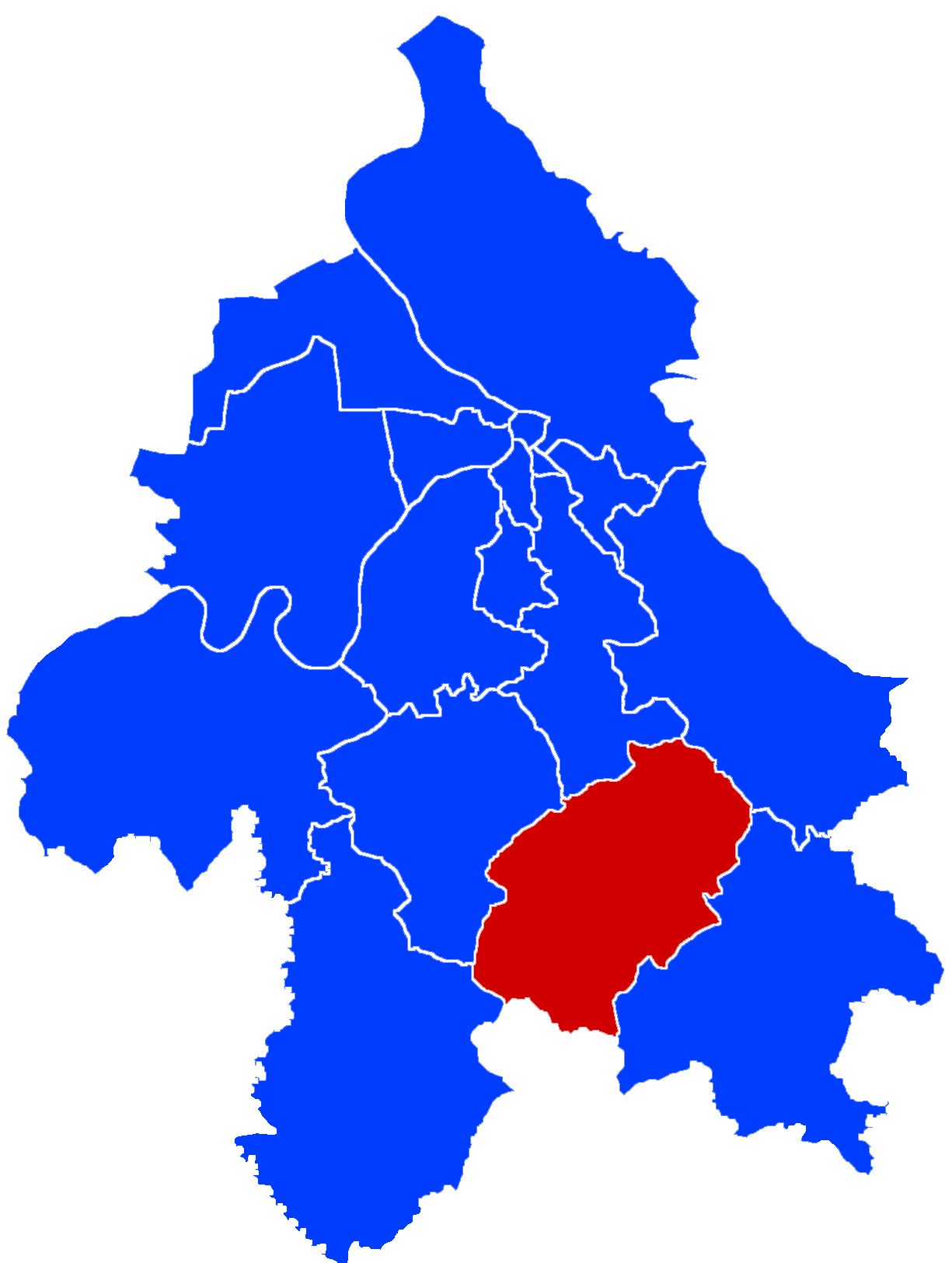
- Location of Sopot within the city of Belgrade
- Coordinates: 44°31′N 20°35′E
- Country: Serbia
- City: Belgrade
- Settlements: 17

Government
  - Mayor: Živorad Milosavljević (SNS)

Area
  - Urban: 23.05 km^{2} (8.90 sq mi)
  - Municipality: 270.67 km^{2} (104.51 sq mi)
- Elevation: 177.38 m (582.0 ft)

Population (2022 census)
  - Urban: 1,956
  - Municipality: 19,126
- Time zone: UTC+1 (CET)
  - Summer (DST): UTC+2 (CEST)
- Postal code: 11450
- Area code: +381(0)11
- Car plates: BG
- Website: www.sopot.org.rs

Sopot (Serbian Cyrillic: Сопот, pronounced [sɔ̂pɔːt]) is a municipality of the city of Belgrade. According to the 2022 census results, the town has a population of 1,956 inhabitants while the municipality has 19,126 inhabitants.

== Location ==
Sopot is located on the slopes of the Kosmaj mountain, 45 kilometres (28 mi) south of Belgrade. The mountain is some 8 kilometres (5.0 mi) away from the town.

== History ==
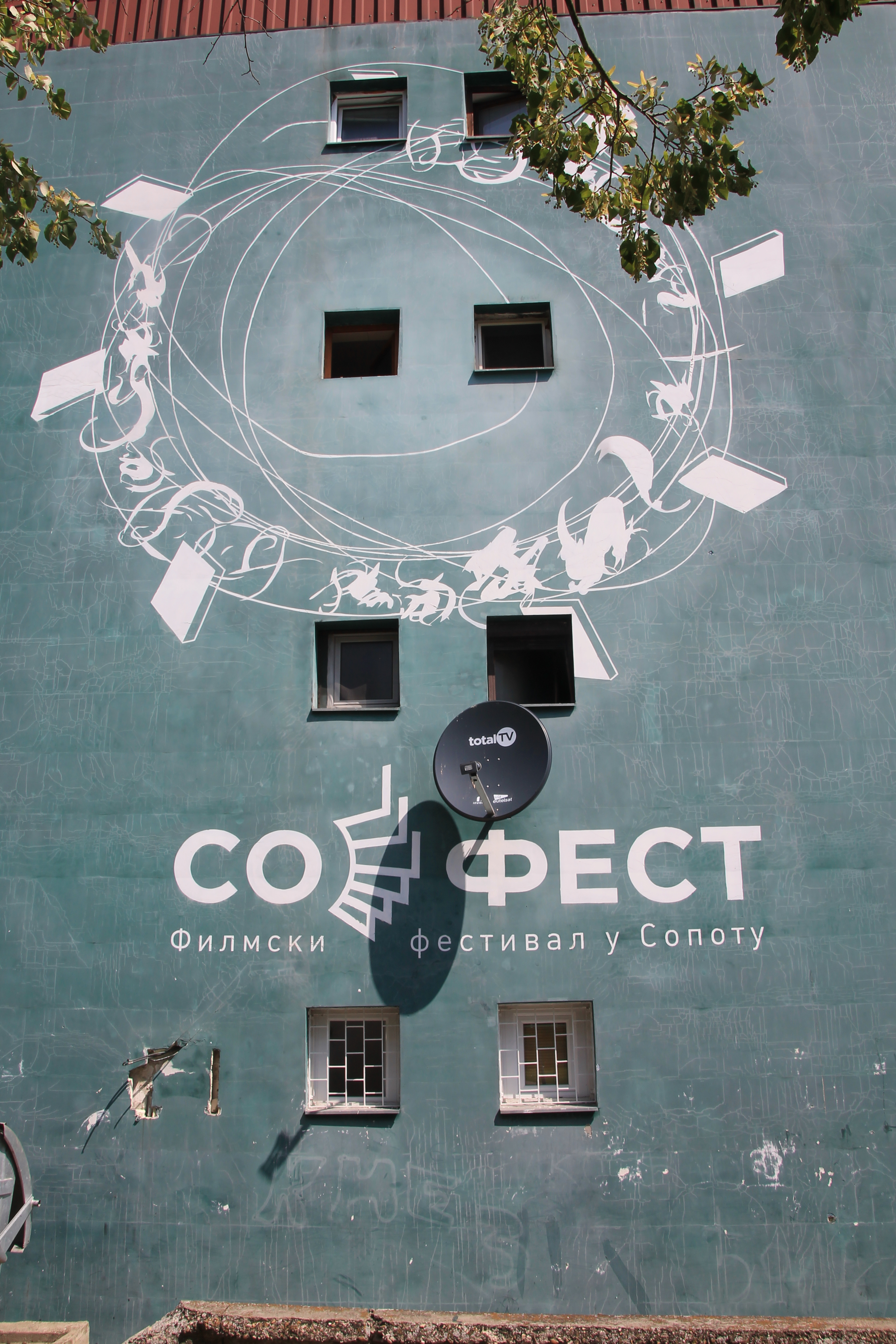
Mural of Sofest

The area has remains from Roman period. There is a masonry drinking fountain in Sopot, for which the Roman stones from some now disappeared structure were used.

The name of Sopot is derived from the old Slavic word for water spring (Serbian: izvor).(cf. Sopotnica). The word itself is onomatopoeic of the water sound flowing out of the spring. There are numerous springs and short creeks and streams in the area.

The village was mentioned in written records for the first time in 1818. In 1823, Serbian ruling prince Miloš Obrenović ordered for the meyhane to be built on the road which through Sopot was heading for Belgrade. The tavern was known as šindralija type, because it was roofed by šindra, or shingle. In 1830, huts for the travelers to Belgrade were built around it, expanding effectively the venue into the khan. It remains the oldest structure in the town and today hosts the Heritage Museum. There is a small park in front of it, through which flows one of many streams. In 1893, Sopot was declared a small town (varošica) by the royal decree.

In October 2019, the village of Ropočevo was officially abolished and its territory was annexed to the town of Sopot.

== Characteristics ==
Since 1972, an annual film festival "Sofest" has been held in Sopot. It is held in July, in the town's Culture Hall.

At the town's center are the Municipal Hall surrounded by the lush greenery, a fountain, and a monument to World War I combatant Đura Prokić. After the festival, there are several other monuments inspired by the motion pictures. Large number of weekend houses was built throughout the municipality since the 1970s, by the residents of Belgrade. The town is also a trade center, with well known farmers market, with local goods which includes peppers, tomatoes, cucumbers and other vegetables and fruits.

Hilly areas on Kosmaj are covered with forests of oak, beech and common hornbeam. Monasteries of Tresije, Pavlovac and Kasteljan (in ruins), are local tourist attractions. The stone church of Saint Peter and Paul is located in the village of Nemenikuće. In the churchyard there are six mulberry trees, estimated to originate from between 1600 and 1650. Being on the access road to Belgrade, Sopot had numerous restaurants and kafanas, and earned a moniker of a settlement with largest number of kafanas per capita.

Nowadays, the municipality has a large Primary and Economics high school. Sopot has a soccer club called the Wolves from Kosmaj and a basketball club bearing the same name.

== Settlements ==
Aside from the town of Sopot, the following settlements comprise the municipality:

- Babe
- Guberevac
- Dučina
- Drlupa
- Đurinci
- Mala Ivanča
- Mali Požarevac
- Nemenikuće
- Parcani
- Popović
- Ralja
- Rogača
- Sibnica
- Slatina
- Stojnik

== Demographics ==
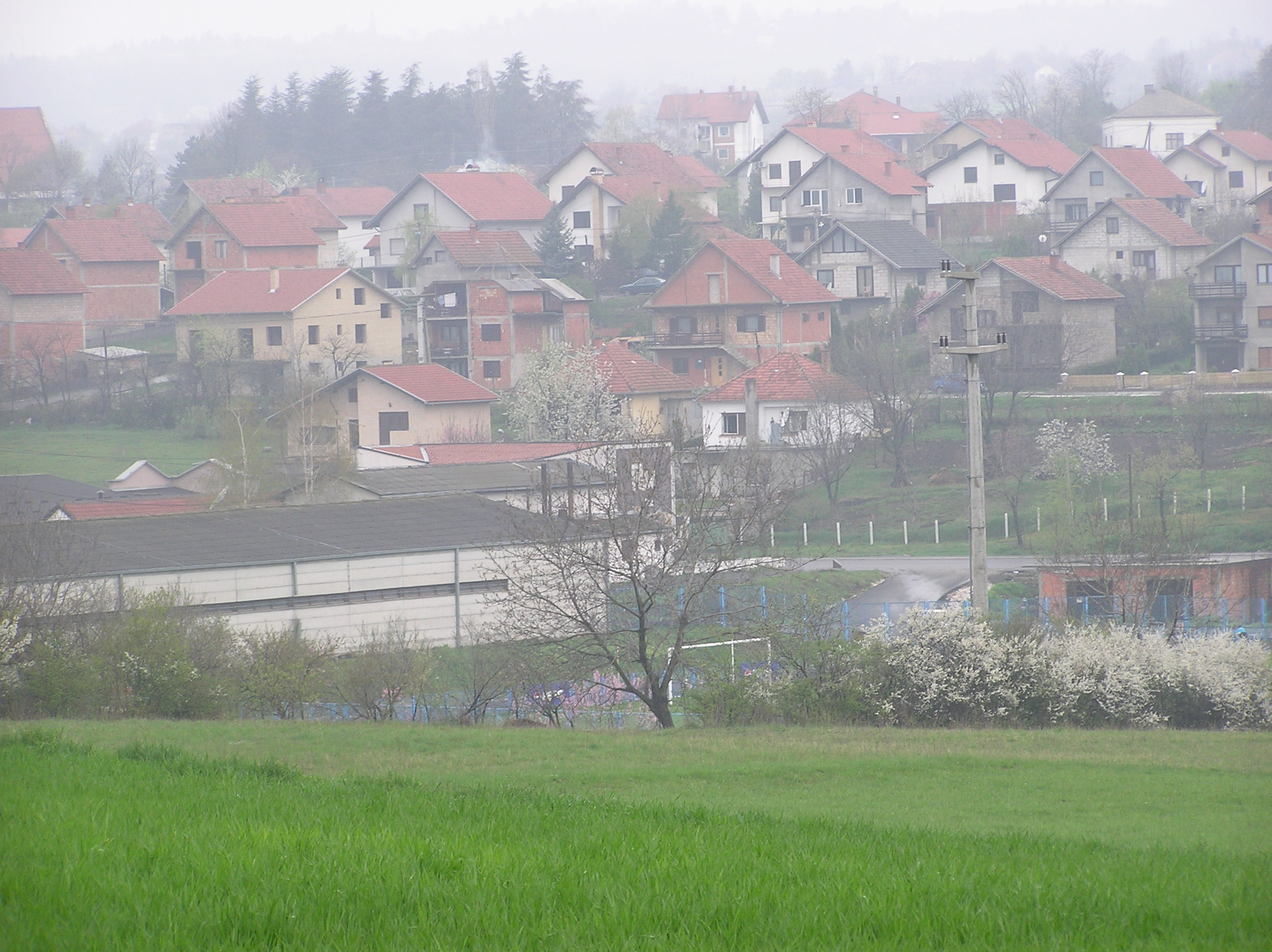
Panoramic view on Sopot's neighborhood

Historical population
Year	Pop.	±% p.a.
1948	22,857	—
1953	23,182	+0.28%
1961	23,131	−0.03%
1971	21,166	−0.88%
1981	20,860	−0.15%
1991	20,527	−0.16%
2002	20,390	−0.06%
2011	20,367	−0.01%

According to the 2011 census results, the municipality of Sopot has a population of 20,367 inhabitants.

=== Ethnic groups ===
The ethnic composition of the municipality:

Ethnic group	Population	%
Serbs	19,554	96.01 %
Romani	148	0.73 %
Montenegrins	52	0.26 %
Macedonians	37	0.18 %
Croats	34	0.17 %
Yugoslavs	31	0.15 %
Russians	14	0.07 %
Hungarians	13	0.06 %
Romanians	10	0.05 %
Others	474	2.33 %
Total	20,367	100 %

== Economy ==
The following table gives a preview of total number of registered people employed in legal entities per their core activity (as of 2022):

Activity	Total
Agriculture, forestry and fishing	25
Mining and quarrying	2
Manufacturing	1,355
Electricity, gas, steam and air conditioning supply	35
Water supply; sewerage, waste management and remediation activities	117
Construction	477
Wholesale and retail trade, repair of motor vehicles and motorcycles	518
Transportation and storage	241
Accommodation and food services	216
Information and communication	68
Financial and insurance activities	51
Real estate activities	15
Professional, scientific and technical activities	191
Administrative and support service activities	68
Public administration and defense; compulsory social security	152
Education	337
Human health and social work activities	284
Arts, entertainment and recreation	44
Other service activities	83
Individual agricultural workers	135
Total	4,416

There are two game hunting grounds in the municipality: Trešnja, which extends into the Voždovac municipality, and Kosmaj, on the mountain of the same name.

== Gallery ==
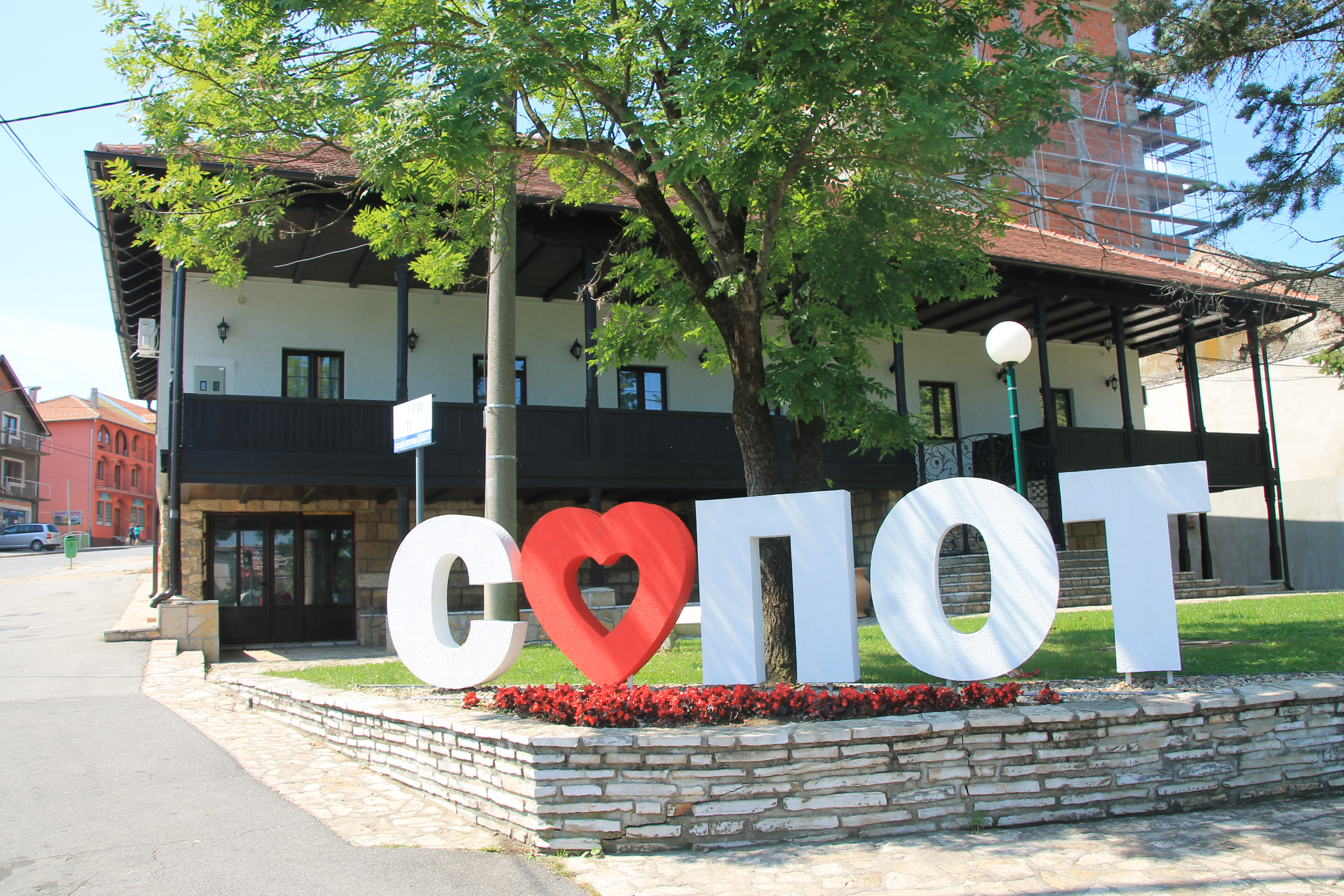
Sopot town center

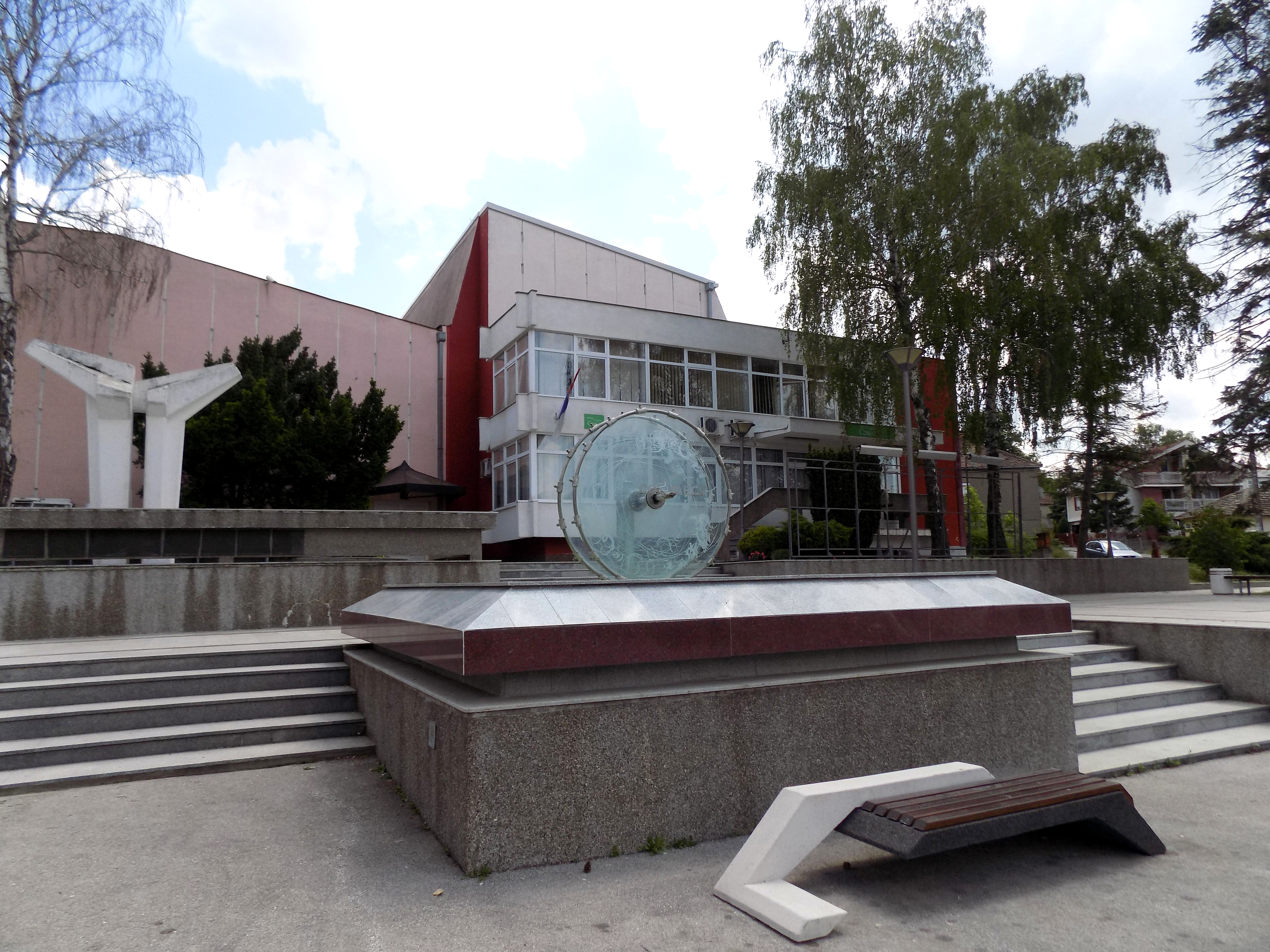
Dom kulture Sopot

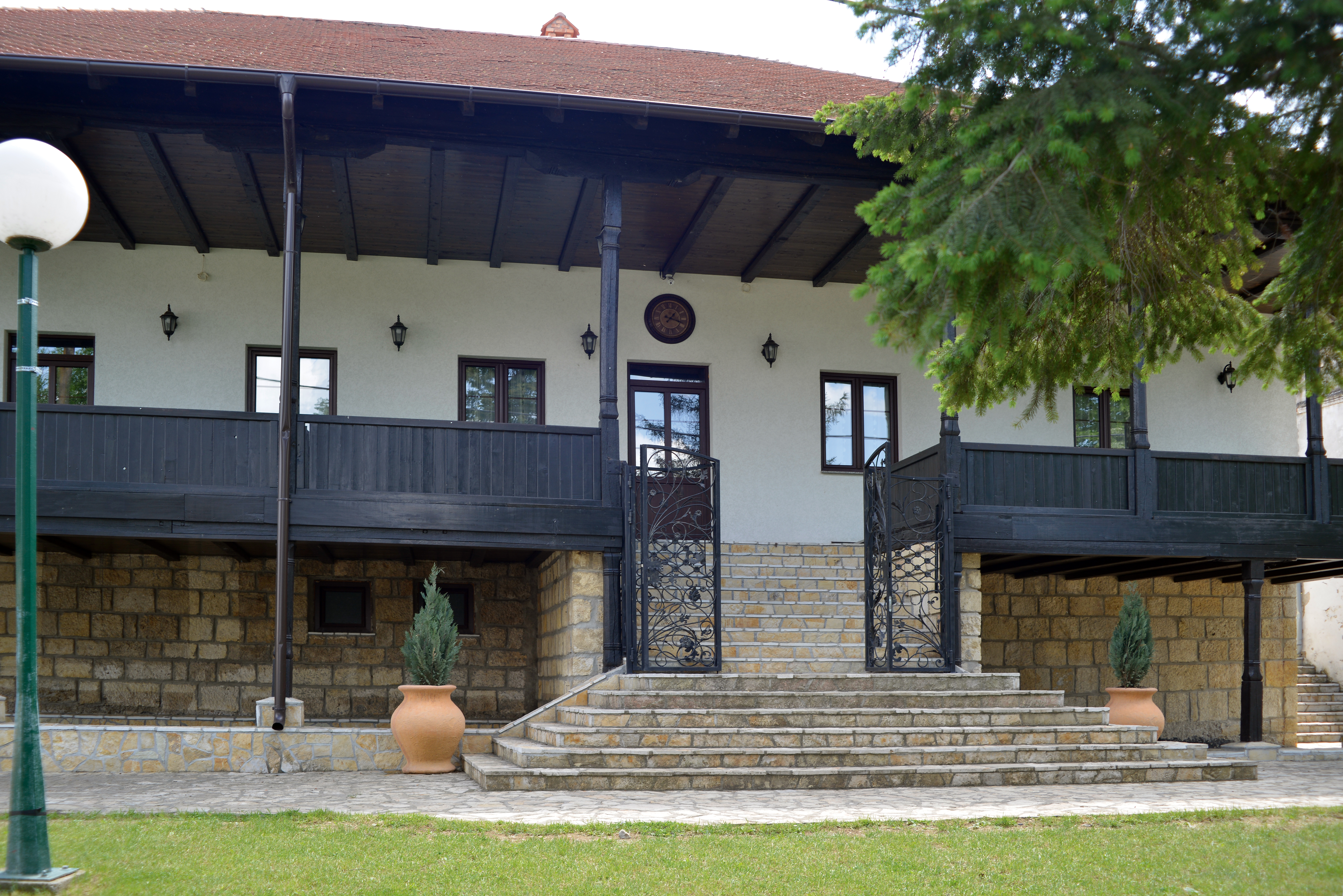
"Stari han" Sopot

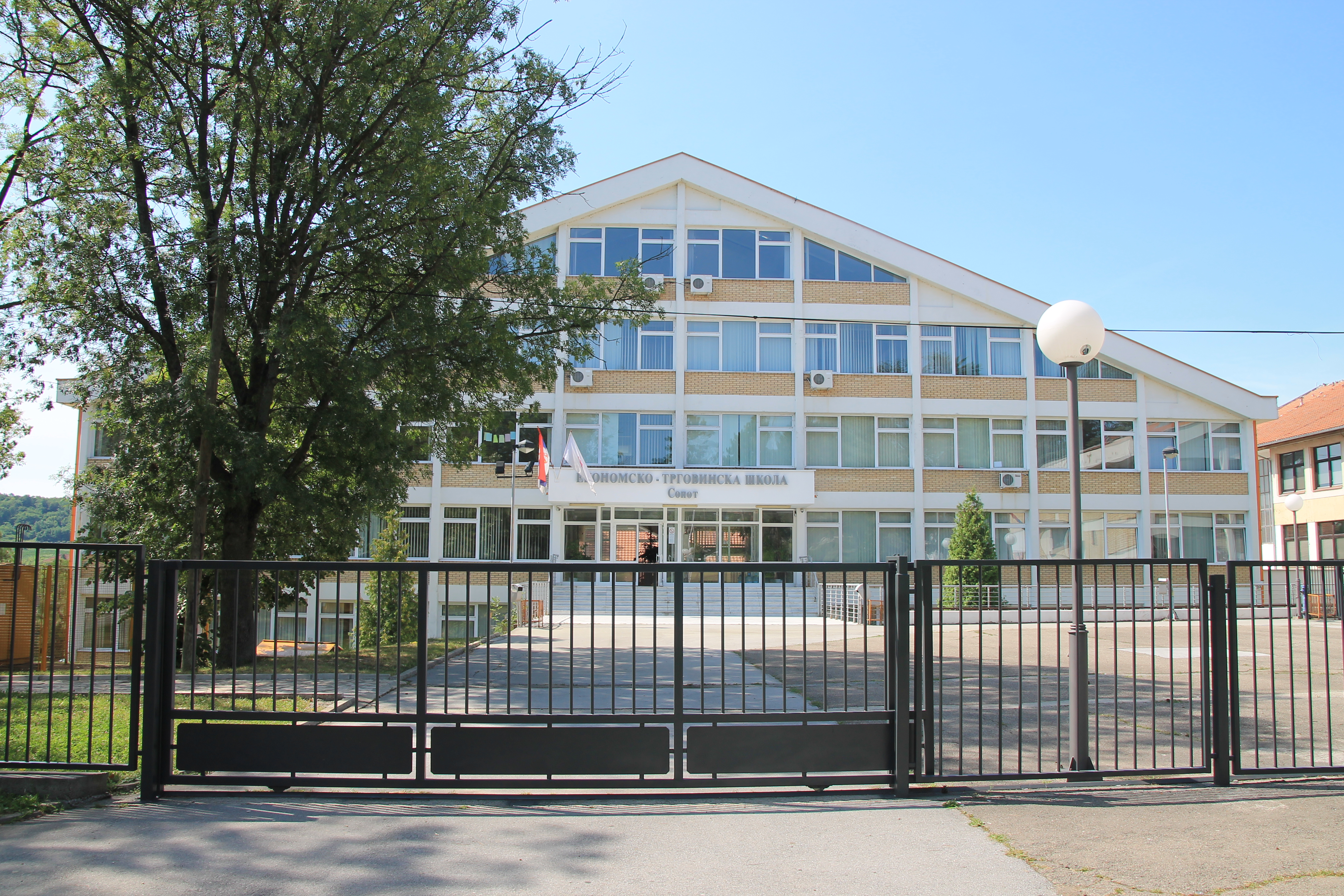
Economics High School

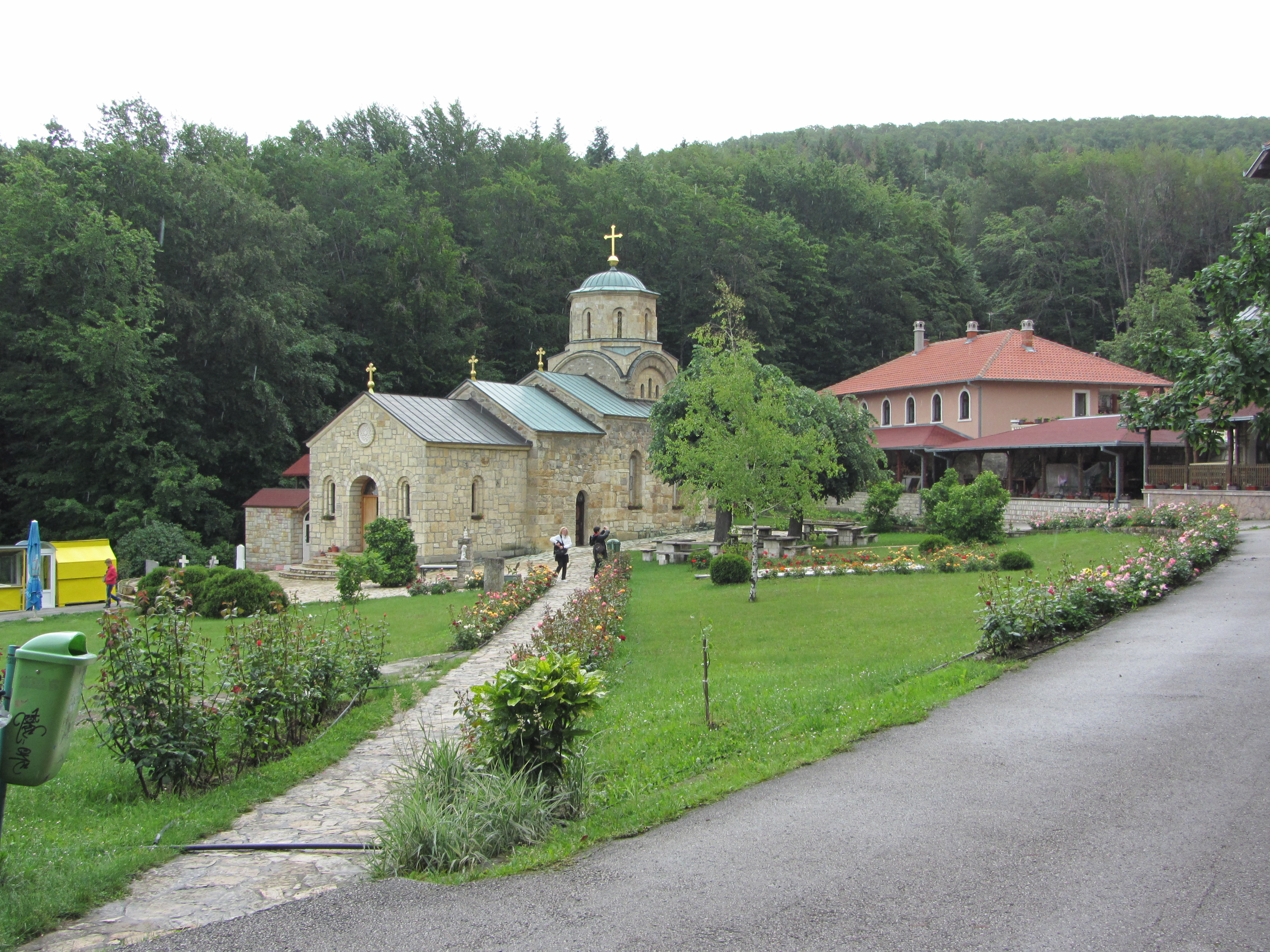
Monastery Tresije

== See also ==
- Subdivisions of Belgrade
- List of Belgrade neighborhoods and suburbs
