= Živorad Milosavljević =

Serbian politician

Živorad Milosavljević (Serbian Cyrillic: Живорад Милосављевић; born 17 February 1956) is a politician in Serbia. He has served as the president (i.e., mayor) of Sopot, a municipality in the city of Belgrade, since 1989, making him the longest continually serving mayor in Serbia. Milosavljević was also a member of the National Assembly of Serbia from 1999 to 2001 and has served in the City Assembly of Belgrade. Formerly a member of the Socialist Party of Serbia and for many years the leader of his own independent political movement, Milosavljević is now a member of the Serbian Progressive Party.

== Early life and private career ==
Milosavljević was born in Rogača, Sopot, in what was then the People's Republic of Serbia in the Federal People's Republic of Yugoslavia. He graduated from the University of Belgrade Faculty of Law in 1979 and worked at TP "Ropočevo" Sopot from 1980 to 1982. He was subsequently a judge for misdemeanour offences from 1982 to 1986; in a 2010 interview, he said that he focused on preventative measures over punishment. Between 1986 and 1989, he worked as secretary of the municipal assembly of Sopot. He is now a farmer in private life.

He contracted COVID-19 in 2020 and recovered after being hospitalized for thirteen days.

== Politician ==
=== Member of the League of Communists and the Socialist Party ===
Milosavljević became politically active as a member of the League of Communists of Serbia. While still serving as secretary of the Sopot assembly, he led a movement assisting farmers in Rogača who complained that they did not have access to telephones. This increased his profile in the municipality, and he was first elected as mayor of Sopot and a member of the Belgrade city assembly in the 1989 Serbian local elections, the last to be held while Serbia was a one-party socialist state. The League of Communists was succeeded by the Socialist Party of Serbia in 1990; Milosavljević became a member of the new party and was re-elected under its banner following the restoration of multi-party democracy in the early 1990s. The Socialist Party was the dominant party in Serbia during the 1990s, with its members controlling most government institutions during Slobodan Milošević's authoritarian rule.

Milosavljević was elected again in Sopot and Belgrade in the 1996 local elections, which saw the opposition Zajedno (Together) movement briefly take power at the city level.

The Socialist Party contested the 1997 Serbian parliamentary election at the head of an alliance that also included Yugoslav Left and New Democracy. Milosavljević appeared on the alliance's electoral list in the Čukarica constituency (which included Sopot), receiving the tenth position out of twelve. The alliance won four seats in the division, and Milosavljević was not initially chosen for a mandate. (From 1992 to 2000, one-third of the mandates in Serbian parliamentary elections were awarded to candidates on successful lists in numerical order, with the other two-thirds assigned to other candidates on the lists at the discretion of the successful parties and coalitions. Milosavljević could have been awarded a seat in 1997 despite his low position on the list, but this did not occur.) The Socialists won the election overall and formed a new government.

New Democracy later left the SPS-led alliance, and on 15 July 1999 the Socialist Party formally revoked the mandates of the New Democracy parliamentarians. This created a number of vacancies, one of which was in Čukarica; Milosavljević was chosen to receive the vacated mandate and served in the national assembly for the next two years as a supporter of the administration.

The 2000 Yugoslavian general election, held over two rounds in September and October, was a watershed moment in Serbian and Yugoslavian politics, resulting in the defeat of the Socialist Party and the fall of Milošević's administration. The Socialist Party–Yugoslav Left alliance also suffered a resounding defeat in the concurrent local elections in Belgrade, with only four of its candidates (out of 110) winning election at the city level. Milosavljević was one of the four successful candidates, winning election for another term in Sopot's second constituency seat. He also led the alliance to its only victory at the municipal level in Belgrade, taking twenty-one of the thirty-three seats in the Sopot local assembly and being selected for another term as mayor.

The fall of Milošević's government led to a new Serbian parliamentary election in December 2000. For this election, the entire country was designated as a single electoral constituency and all parliamentary mandates were to be assigned to candidates on the electoral lists at the discretion of successful parties and coalitions, irrespective of numerical order. Milosavljević appeared on the Socialist Party's list – which was mostly alphabetical – in the 135h position. The list won thirty-seven seats out of 250, and he was not selected for a mandate when the new parliament convened in early 2001.

He was expelled from the Socialist Party in 2002, against the backdrop of intra-party divisions. He was aligned with the founders of the breakaway Socialist People's Party at this time, though he ultimately did not become a member.

=== Independent politician and member of the Progressive Party ===
Milosavljević led his own political movement, known simply as For the Municipality of Sopot, to plurality victories in the municipal elections of 2004, 2008, and 2012, and in each instance continued to serve as mayor after the election.

In early 2016, Milosavljević merged his movement into the Serbian Progressive Party. He led the Progressive list to a landslide majority victory in Sopot in the 2016 local elections, winning twenty-five of thirty-three mandates. In the 2020 elections, he led the list to an increased victory with twenty-seven seats. He continues to serve as mayor of Sopot as of 2021.

Milosavljević is an admirer of Tito and displays a large painting of the former Yugoslavian president in his office. He has said that his political ideals have remained consistent throughout his time in public life, irrespective of his party affiliation.

== Electoral record ==
=== Local (City Assembly of Belgrade) ===
2000 City of Belgrade election Sopot Division II
Ljubiša Grujić	Serbian Radical Party	
Živorad Milosavljević	Socialist Party of Serbia–Yugoslav Left	Elected
Mladen Petrović	Democratic Opposition of Serbia	
Predrag Vučković	Serbian Renewal Movement	
