= August Hermann Niemeyer =

German Protestant theologian and poet (1754–1828)

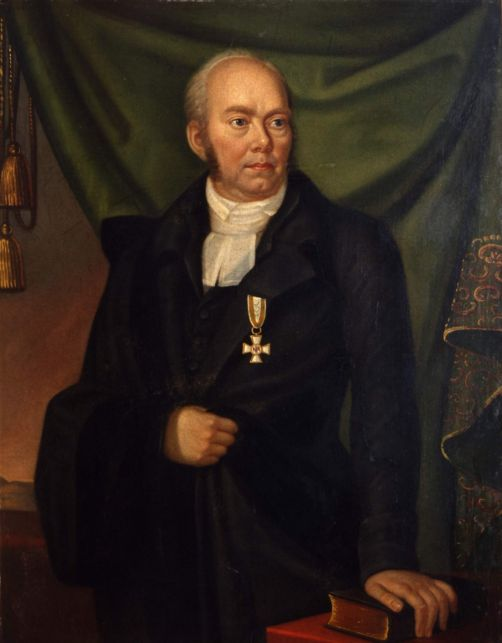
August Hermann Niemeyer (1817)

August Hermann Niemeyer (1 September 1754 in Halle (Saale) – 7 July 1828 in Magdeburg) was a German Protestant theologian, teacher, a librettist, a poet, a travel writer, a Protestant church song poet and a Prussian political educator. He was professor of theology in 1780, then vice-chancellor of the University of Halle-Wittenberg.

He studied at the University of Halle, where his teachers included Johann August Nösselt (1734-1807), Johann Jakob Griesbach (1745-1812) and Johann Salomo Semler (1725-1791). In 1775 he published a highly regarded work, titled Charakteristik der Bibel (Characteristics of the Bible). In 1778 he met with Johann von Goethe, with whom he established a friendship that lasted until Niemeyer's death in 1828. Around 1802, Niemeyer translated Terence’s Andria for Goethe under the title Die Fremde aus Andros. Soon afterwards the play was performed by the Weimar theatre.

In 1807, after Halle fell to French forces, Napoleon ordered the closure of the university, with Niemeyer being deported to Paris. During this time, the city of Halle was incorporated into the Kingdom of Westphalia. On 1 January 1808, Jérôme Bonaparte re-opened the University of Halle and appointed Niemeyer chancellor.

Among Niemeyer's 125 known publications is Grundsätze der Erziehung und des Unterrichts für Eltern, Hauslehrer und Erzieher (Principles of education and teaching for parents, tutors and schoolteachers), being published over numerous editions and translated into several languages.
