= Vikentije Ljuština =

Vikentije Ljuština (Medak, Lika, 6 February 1761 – Vršac, 18 April 1805) was a Serbian writer, philologist, educator and archimandrite.

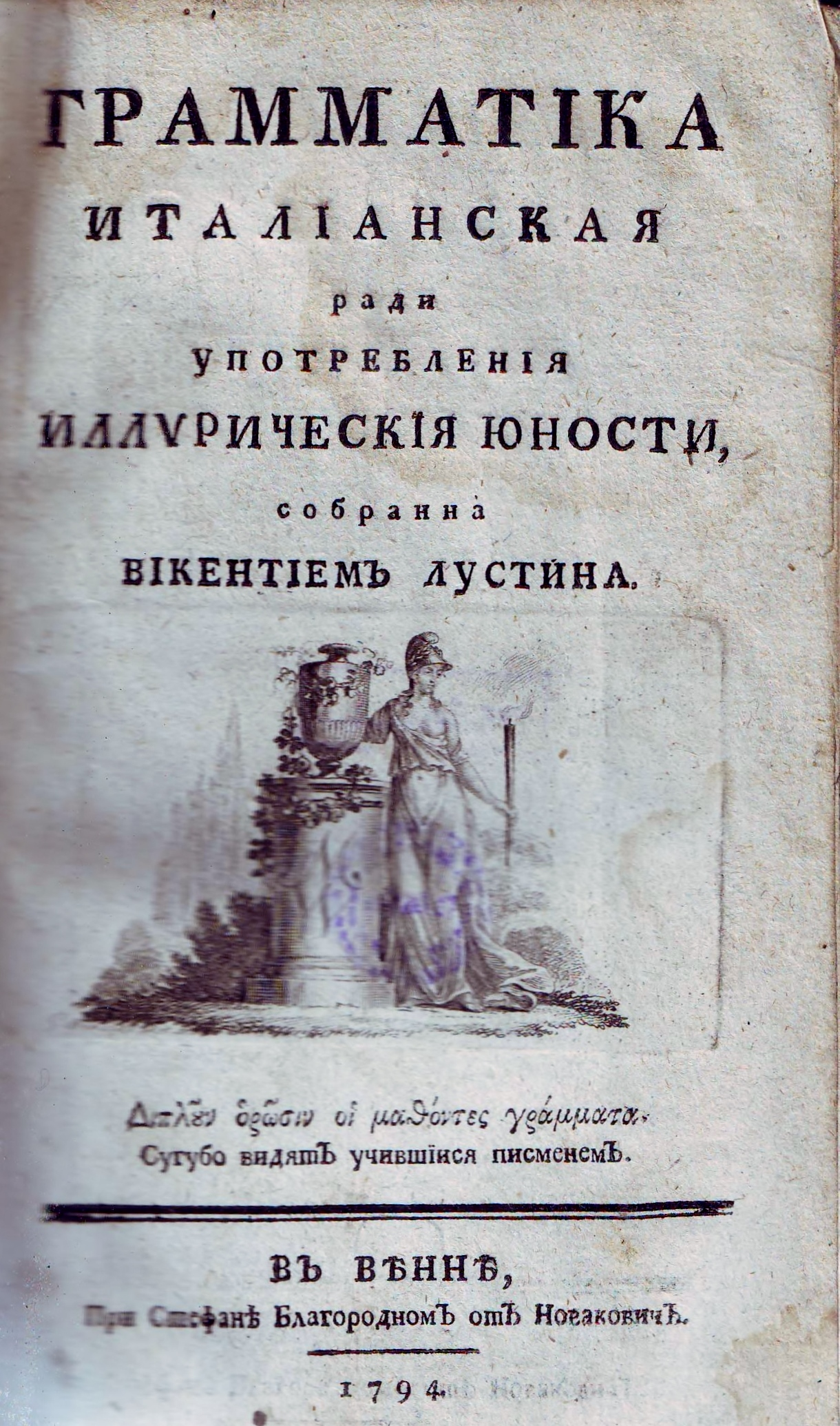
The first page of the book Gramatika italijanskaja (1794)

His real name was Vasilije Ljuština, born in the Lika region on 6 February 1761 to Serbian parents. In the monastery of Gomirje (Gorski Kotar) he became a monk. He was a priest in the Serbian Orthodox Church in Trieste from 1781 until 1789, and thereafter in Sopron until 1795. In 1796, he went to Serbia to the Mesić Monastery, where he, as archimandrite led the monastery until he died.

In Vienna in 1794 Ljuština printed in Cyrillic in Slavoserbian a 506-page Italian grammar for the use of Illyrian youth (radi upotreblenia illyriceskije junosti). While he was the archimandrite of the Mesić monastery, he wrote a historical monograph covering the period from 1225 to 1797.

In 1790 he founded a gymnasium in Vršac.
