= Damjan Kaulić =

Serbian publisher, bookseller and printer

Damjan Stefanović Kaulić, also spelled the Romanian way Damjan Kaulici (Arad, Habsburg monarchy, 1760 – Novi Sad, Austrian Empire, 1810), was a Serbian publisher, bookseller and printer. He was the only bookseller in Novi Sad until 1790 and the appearance of Emanuilo Janković and significantly contributed to the cultural life of the city and the culture of the Serbian people.

Damjan Kaulić is best remembered when he and Emanuilo Janković filed, independently of each other, a request for the establishment of a Serbian printing house in the city of Novi Sad, however, they were both rejected by the Habsburg authorities in 1790.

== Biography ==
He was born in Arad in 1760. He studied bookbinding in Sremski Karlovci, and after that, he worked in Szeged, Buda, Požun and Vienna. After arriving in Novi Sad, he opened a bookbinding shop that would later become a bookstore and printing house. His descendants, starting with his son Constantine, and through his heirs, John, Basil and Damian, were also booksellers. He died in 1810.

== Work ==
In 1781, Kaulić sent an application to the Novi Sad Magistrate, asking for a work permit. At that time, it was difficult to get a permit, because, according to the Regulations on Bookstores from 1722, a bookseller had to know at least three languages, and he had to do an internship, which consisted of apprenticeships with experienced bookstores. The magistrate denied this request. At that time, a bookbinder was working in Novi Sad, the Saxon Karl Ritmiller, who in 1782 accused Kaulić of not being able to perform the bookbinding trade and asked the Magistrate to ban the work of a bookbinder for all Christian Orthodox and Jews. He also sent another request to Kaulić, which the Magistrate also rejected, threatening to confiscate his equipment and material. In 1783, Kaulić addressed the Board of Governors of the Habsburg Monarchy, which ordered the Magistrate to accept Kaulić as a citizen and to allow him to bind books. In July 1784, Kaulić bought the shop of bookkeeper Jozef Urblík in Petrovaradin. He bought bookbinding material and 931 books, most of which were primers, mostly in German, Serbian and Slovak. The following year, Kaulić printed tax books for Novi Sad, from which he received certain funds, which he used to expand his business. He went to Russia, and there he brought an inventory of 3,161 books for his bookstore back home.

At the Timisoara Parliament in 1790, Kaulić sent a request for help and support for the opening of a printing house. Also, at the same time, a request from Emanuilo Janković was received. Kaulić's request was rejected, and Janković's was accepted, after which Janković opened the first printing house in Novi Sad. Kaulić sued Janković the same year, claiming that Janković printed books in Cyrillic, violating the law of the Monarchy. Kaulić went to Vienna with Josef von Kurzböck, where he participated in the printing of the book "Songs Different on Lord's Holidays", which he later sold in his bookstore in Novi Sad. The following year, he reprinted the Passion Gospel, and two years later he published a short essay on private and public works and a textbook, The History of the Bible. In 1793, he opened a bookbinding workshop in Dunavska Street. There is no precise information about his work during the last years of the 18th century.

== Heritage ==
After Kaulić's death in 1810, his son Konstantin (around 1790-1951) took over the bookbinding workshop and significantly improved it. Konstantin helped the Novi Sad Serbian Gymnasium in 1814 with a donation of 200 florins. Constantine retired from the work of a bookseller in early 1842, when his son Jovan took over the business, who, first with his brother Damian Jr., and later alone, continued his work and in 1846 remained the only printer in Novi Sad, after Janković's printing house stopped working.

== Sources ==
- Popov, Cedomir (1996). Novi Sad at the time of the founding of the Serbian Reading Room. Novi Sad.
- Stajić, Vasa (1937). Novi Sad biographies, vol. II. Novi Sad. p. 195—197.
- Stajicć, Vasa (1951). Material for the cultural history of Novi Sad. Novi Sad. p. 196—197.
- Curcić, Marija (1993). Reviews from the bibliography. Novi Sad. p. 16—19.
- Curcić, Laza (1996). Books, readers and booksellers of old Novi Sad. Novi Sad. p. 30.
- Curcić, Marija (1993). Reviews from the bibliography. Novi Sad. p. 17.
- Stajić, Vasa (1951). Material for the cultural history of Novi Sad. Novi Sad. p. 208.
- "Serbske Narodne novine", Budim 1842.
- "Serbian Narodne novine", Budim 1845.
- Stajić, Vasa (1933). Novi Sad, its magistrate and the cultural endeavours of the Novi Sad Serbs. Sremski Karlovci. p. 126.

== See also ==
- Emanuilo Janković
- Josef von Kurzböck
- Atanasije Dimitrijević Sekereš
- Stefan von Novaković
