= Emanuilo Janković =

Serbian writer, dramatist, philosopher, translator, editor and scientist

- Born: 1758; Novi Sad, Habsburg monarchy
- Died: 1792 (aged 33–34); Subotica, Habsburg Monarchy
- Citizenship: Habsburg
- Occupations: Writer; philosopher; translator; editor

Emanuilo Janković (Serbian Cyrillic: Емануило Јанковић; 1758–1792) was a Serbian writer, dramatist, philosopher, translator, editor and scientist. He translated a number of dramatic works and was an innovator in the use of Serbian Cyrillic vernacular in the 18th-century Serbian literary society.

== Life ==
Janković was likely born in 1758 to a Serbian family in Neusatz Stadt (modern Novi Sad), then part of the Military Frontier of the Habsburg monarchy (now Serbia). Much about his life is not known for certain. His father Sava, a merchant, arrived in Novi Sad by 1743 and married Sara Miloradović, member of a prominent Herzegovinian family. Emanuil was the fourth of six children. He probably attended Latin school in Novi Sad among other institutions. It is known for certain that he attended the Faculty of Medicine at Halle University beginning in April 1786. Given his late enrollment there, he might have also previously studied in other universities in either Budapest or Vienna.

That same year, a visit to Italy appears to have inspired a career change as he transitioned from the field of medicine to focus on other subjects. In 1787, he published Tergovicia (The Merchants), a translation and adaptation of playwright Carlo Goldoni's I Mercatanti. This was a significant step for the Serbian literary scene as it was only the second work of Belles-lettres to appear among Serbs in the 19th century, the first to appear in vernacular and the first overall Serbian dramatical work. In the epilogue, Janković dedicates the work to Emperor Joseph II and expresses his wishes to educate his own people using the "foreign masterpieces" of their "enlightened neighbors". He also wrote about his intentions to translate German works.

Very early on Emanuilo Janković became aware that in eighteenth-century Serbian (no different than the rest of the European languages at the time), there was no normalized literary language and orthography, and that learned men often wrote in an idiom that was incomprehensible to the common folk and the uneducated. Janković read Dositej Obradović and corresponded with him. He knew Dositej's efforts to write in a language that was close to the vernacular and understandable to all. By then, the works of Obradović were being brought to the attention of European scholars, and Jernej Kopitar was among the first to embrace the efforts of Dositej Obradović and Emanuilo Janković.

His second publication Fizieeskoje soeinenije o izsiseniju i razdjelenij vode u vozduh, i izjasnenije razlivanija vode iz vozduha na zemlju (A Physical Treatise on the evaporation and distribution of water in the air and an explanation of the precipitation of water from the air on to the earth) was a work on physics and intended be continued as part of a broader book but ultimately did not materialize further due to financial difficulties and lack of a patron.

In 1788, he published Opisanije zivota i heroiceskich djel Cesaro-Kraljevskago feldmars'ala Barona ot Laudon (A Description of the Life and Heroic Deeds of His Majesty's Fieldmarshal Baron von Laudon) which was a translation from a German original. He also wrote the first modern Serbian treatise on hygiene.

In 1789, Janković published two further translations of original German dramatic works, the first being Zao otac i nevaljao sin i1i roucite valu decu poznavati (The Wicked Father and the Roguish Son, or Parents Get to Know your Children) which was published in Vienna. The second was Lagodarni sin (The Grateful Son), a translation of Johann Jakob Engel's play Der dankbare Sohn - Ein landliches Lustspiel in einem Aufz. Lagordani sinwas published in the Cyrillic civil alphabet in Leipzig.

In August 1789, he travelled to Prague to learn printing and bookbinding skills. The following year, he thought about opening a printing school in Belgrade but impeded by the Austro-Turkish War. In 1790 he and Damjan Kaulić both independently petitioned for a Serbian printing house in Novi Sad, but were rejected by the Austrian government.

Emanuilo Janković died in 1792 in Subotica.

His importance lies in his pioneering work at the period of the Age of Enlightenment in such diverse fields as science, drama, and publishing, as well as in the use of the vernacular in literature.

Janković was one of the authors who applied phonemic principles with relative consistency in solutions involving individual phonemes or phoneme sequences.

== Bibliography ==
In chronological order:

- Tergovicia, komedija u tri akta. U. ott. 1787.
- Fizicseszkoje szocsinenije o izsušenijú í razdelenijú vode u vazduch. Lipcse. 1787.
- Zsivotvopiszaníje gyénerala Laudona. Bécs. 1788.
- Blagodarni szín. Lipcse. 1789.
- Zao otac i nevaljao syn. Bécs. 1789.

He also published the work of Stefan von Novaković in 1791 Kurzgefasste Abhandlung über die Verdienste und Schicksale der serbischen oder razischen Nazion, in dem Königreiche Hungarn: mit einem Anhang der derselben verliehenen Privilegien

== Annotations ==
1. Name: His name was Emanuilo Janković (Емануило Јанковић). His first name is also written Emanuil (Емануил Јанковић).

== See also ==
- Damjan Kaulić
- Josef von Kurzböck
- Atanasije Dimitrijević Sekereš
- Stefan von Novaković

== Sources ==
- Herrity, Peter (July 1980). "Emanuil Janković: Serbian Dramatist and Scientist of the Eighteenth Century". The Slavonic and East European Review. 58 (3): 321–344. JSTOR 4208076.
