= Josef von Kurzböck =

Austrian bookseller, printer, and writer (1735–1792)

Josef Ritter von Kurzböck, also Joseph von Kurzbeck (21 November 1735, Vienna, Habsburg monarchy – 18 December 1792, Vienna, Habsburg Empire), was an Austrian printer, bookseller, merchant, estate owner and writer and one of the most prolific, Serbian Cyrillic printers in the Austrian Empire.

== Biography ==
In 1755, he took over from his father the university book printing shop that had two presses and in the next few years he acquired 15 presses with a capacity to print books in Illyrian (Serbian Cyrillic) and Oriental languages. In recognition of his typographic achievements, he was granted permission to build a university bookstore. Kurzböck continued his technical improvements in letter casting and letterpress printing, making the privately protected book printer with efficient equipment and fair prices to successfully compete against Johann von Trattner (1717-1798) the Court Printer. His letterpress products were among the finest in the Holy Roman Empire as Austria and Hungary were then known. Empress Maria Theresa ennobled Kurzböck for his great merits in 1776. He translated several writings from Italian and published in 1779 an augmented and improved edition of the 1766 published "Almanac de Vienne en faveur des éstrangers" in German and French.

In 1792, after von Kurzböck died, the Serbian (Illyrian) printing house was sold to Stefan von Novaković and the Oriental press was sold to Anton Schmid (1765-1855).

== See also ==
- Emanuilo Janković
- Damjan Kaulić
- Stefan von Novaković
