= Kosmaj =

Mountain in Serbia

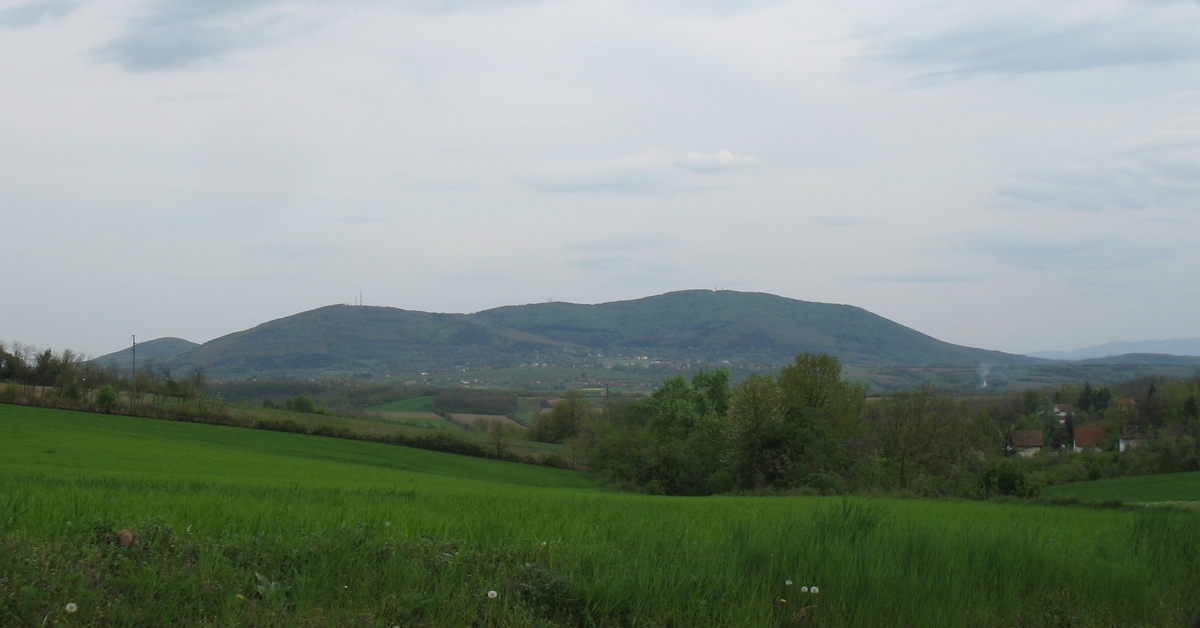

Highest point
- Elevation: 626 m (2,054 ft)
- Coordinates: 44°27′56″N 20°33′56″E

Geography
- Location within Serbia
- Location: Central Serbia
- Parent range: Dinaric Alps

Kosmaj (Serbian Cyrillic: Космај, pronounced [kɔ̌smaːj]) is a mountain 40 kilometers to the south-east of Belgrade. With an elevation of 626 meters, it is the highest point of the administrative area of the City of Belgrade and is nicknamed one of two "Belgrade mountains" (the other being the mountain of Avala).

== Etymology ==
It is speculated that the mountain was named after the Celtic word cos meaning forest, and maj pre-Indo-European word meaning mountain. Alternative explanations suggest the connection to the ancient mountain-dwelling Slavic pagan deity Kozmaj/Kasmaj, the protector of woods, animals and the cosmos. The mountain has never been known under any other name, until it was forcefully molded by the Romans into "Casa Maias", house of Maia, in order to promote worship of their goddess of spring among the locals.

== Geography ==
The mountain is 5.5 kilometres (3.4 mi) kilometers long and built of flysch, serpentine, and magmatic rocks. The highest peak is also named Kosmaj. It is a low, island mountain, the second northernmost in Šumadija region (after Avala). Until 600,000 years ago, when the surrounding low areas were flooded by the inner Pannonian Sea, the Kosmaj was an island, just as the neighboring mountains (Avala, Fruška Gora to the north, etc.), thus earning its geographical classification. The Kosmaj remains an island mountain as the plateaux around it are low and mostly flat. In the north it extends into the direction of Trešnja, the southernmost extension of the Avala, while in the north-west it extends into Parcanski vis ("Parcani rising"), 408 metres (1,339 ft) high ending section of the Kosmaj, which extends into the woods of Lipovička šuma.

There are three peaks on the mountain, each with descriptive name: Mali Vis (little one). Goli Vis (naked one) and Rutavi Vis (hairy or bushy one).

The Kosmaj is source of several rivers. Turija river (and several of its tributaries, including Sibnička reka), which springs right below the mountain and flows to the west into the Kolubara river. Other originate below the Parčanski vis: Lug (or Veliki Lug) which flows to the east into the Kubršnica, Ralja also flows to the east into the Jezava, outflow of the Great Morava, and Topčiderka which flows to the north, into the urban center of Belgrade.

== History ==
In Roman period, Kosmaj was an important mining center, but today the mining activities ceased completely. Evidence suggests that the iron ore was extracted even in the pre-Roman period.

In medieval Serbia mining began in c.1420, after the Law on mines was issued by the Despot Stefan Lazarević in 1412.

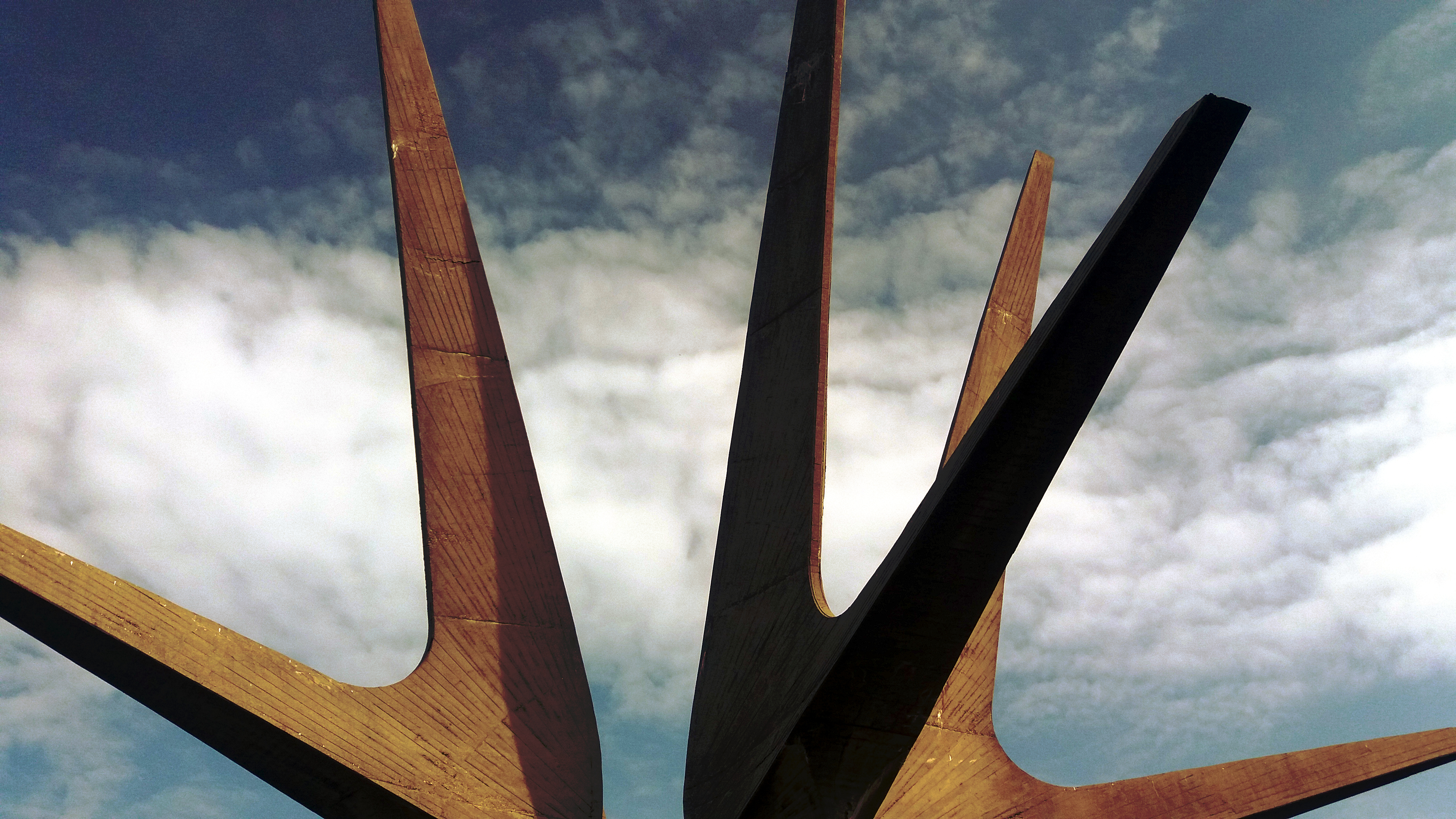
Monument to the Kosmaj Partisan Detachment from the World War II on top of the mountain

In 2000, during the excavations for the new sports complex in Babe, a spring was discovered in the valley of the Pruten creek. The new Pruten spring has a capacity up to 40 L/s (1.4 cu ft/s) and by 2011 a waterwork was constructed which supplies the villages of Babe, Stojnik and Ropočevo, so as the complex itself, with the water from this spring. Moreover, during the excavation, a hidden entry into the vast complex of Roman mines was discovered, too, being obscured for centuries. There are evidence of the extraction of silver, iron and lead. In the 3rd century AD, the Kosmaj mines were one of the most important in the Roman Empire, and were administered by the Roman procurator Babenius, whose name is preserved in the name of the Babe village. In the 1970s and 1980s, experts from the National Museum in Belgrade explored the area and discovered many mining necropolis, centered around the villages of Babe, Stojnik and Guberevac. It is estimated that there are some 100 ancient mining shafts on Kosmaj, which go 2 km (1.2 mi) below the ground and are 25 km (16 mi) wide. After the Roman period, mining activities ceased, only being revived in the Medieval Serbia.

In 2022, it was announced that the Serbia Zijin Bor Copper company has been surveying the mountain for possible mining. Due to the bad image of the company regarding pollution, this caused public furor, especially due to the ongoing environmental protests. Zijin immediately backed off, saying they are stopping the surveys and that they inherited the 2012 survey rights and partial permits due to the purchase and ownership changes in some other companies. The government confirmed that on Zijin's official request, it issued a survey ceasing decision. The explored area was the Babe-Ljuta Strana survey field, spreading in three municipalities (Barajevo, Sopot and Voždovac), and surveyed ores included lead, zinc, copper, silver and gold.

== Wildlife ==
=== Plants ===
Together with the Avala, the island of Veliko Ratno Ostrvo and the wood of Stepin Lug, the Kosmaj is a part of the circle of the protected green areas of Belgrade.

The Kosmaj remained highly forested, over 70%, mostly by the deciduous (beech and oak), and to the lesser extent, coniferous woods. While the beech and oak forests are results of the natural, spontaneous growth, the patches of conifers were planted by humans. Forests cover steeper slopes of the mountain, while the gentler slopes are grass-covered. Foothills are covered in orchards and arable fields. Self-grown plants used for human consumption include bear's garlic, woodland strawberry, blackberry and cornelian cherry. As bear's garlic (sremuš or medveđi luk) became more and more popular in Serbian cuisine in the 21st century, group picking of the plant on the mountain was organized in the early 2020s, and the Bear's garlic festival was founded in 2023.

Altogether, 551 plant and 300 fungi species inhabits the mountain, including the endangered larkspur (Delphinium phissum) which is on the Red List. Some 150 plant species are medicinal or edible and 5 are under the strict protection. Additionally, there are 30 relics, 10 sub-endemics, 25 endangered taxa and 60 species under the strict control of use and trade. Of fungi species, 80 are edible, 17 are medicinal and 11 are poisonous.

Cleared areas are mostly used as pastures or are being cultivated as orchards and vineyards.

=== Animals ===
There are 17 newly discovered species of clearwing moths and it is believed that this is their only habitat in Serbia. Animals inhabiting the mountain include 13 amphibian, 11 reptilian, 51 mammal and 96 bird species, including the more common hares, roes, pheasants, foxes, squirrels, hedgehogs, partridges and quails but also in Serbia rare, Red Listed corn crake. Wolves, once living on Kosmaj, are extinct from the mountain.

== Protection ==
In 2005, a landscape of outstanding features "Kosmaj" was declared. Protected area covers 3.5145 hectares (8.685 acres) and spreads in the municipalities of Mladenovac (villages Amerić, Koračica and Velika Ivanča) and Sopot (Rogača and Nemenikuće). The protected terrain is divided in two levels of protection, II and III.

== Tourism ==
The Kosmaj is touristically well prepared for hiking, cycling and touring historic and religious landmarks. It has a hotel, mountaineering camp, villas, etc. Proximity of Belgrade and mountain's gentle slopes, glades and woods are a basis for the touristic economy. Latest addition, since the mid-2000s is a modern, vast resort complex of "Babe", near the village of the same name.

Hunting tourism is also an opportunity, because the mountain is rich in game. Section of the mountain is organized as the hunting ground "Kosmaj", on the territory of the Sopot municipality.

On the top of the mountain, a wooden tower was built and arranged as the observation point. Water spring Hajdučica is a popular tourist attraction. Several monasteries are located in the mountain's downhill: Tresije, Kastaljan (in ruins) and Pavlovac, all over 600 years old. There is a mineral spa on the southern slopes, near the village of Koraćica (Koraćička banja).

There are two monuments on the top of the mountain. One is dedicated to the fallen soldiers of World War I. It is situated at the Beli Kamen locality, just below the wooden tower. It is a memorial ossuary dedicated to the members of the Timok Division, who defended Belgrade in 1914. The other monument was built on the Mali Vis peak in 1971. It commemorates the soldiers of the Partisan Kosmaj Partisan Detachment from World War II.

Since the 2010s, village tourism developed in the mountain's villages, so as the weekend and excursion tourism due to the proximity of Belgrade. There are also lake and hunting ground Trešnja and public swimming pools "Verona" in Rogača and "Izvor" in Stojnik. Apart from the monasteries ("Mount Athos of Despot Stefan Lazarević"), touristic objects on the mountain include the Sopot Khan and the Old Žujović House. Numerous annual festivals are organized in the villages, dedicated, among other, to frula, fiacres, goulash or health food.

== Kosmaj monasteries ==
There were seven monasteries on the mountain, but three survived until today: Kastaljan, Pavlovac and Tresije. Historically, or in folk mythology, they are all in some way connected to the ruler Stefan Lazarević (1377-1427), who died while crossing the mountain. With the Church of Saint Apostles Peter and Paul in the village of Nemenikuće, Church of Saint Elijah with Stefan Lazarević's cenotaph and several other objects, the Kosmaj's religious and memorial complex is colloquially called "Kosmaj's Mount Athos", a usual moniker in Serbia when a number of religious objects is clustered on one location. The marble pillar-like cenotaph with inscription was erected by Stefan Lazarević's aide, Đurađ Zubović, at the location where Stefan Lazarević collapsed, fell from his horse and died during the hunting.

=== Kastaljan ===
Also called Kasteljan, it was built in the early 14the century, during the reign of king Stefan Dragutin, on the foundations of the former Roman castrum from the 2nd and 3rd century. The trade caravan route passed next to it. During the reign of despot Stefan Lazarević large konaks for the travelers were built. The monastery, dedicated to the Saint George, is today in ruins, being demolished in the late 17th century. Excavations were conducted in the 1960s and the 1970s, when the high altar, with carved representation of a deer, was uncovered. Remains of some frescoes confirm that the monastery was painted. A liturgy among the ruins is being held every year on the Đurđevdan. The monastery is "awaiting the reconstruction". The reconstruction started in 2025.

=== Pavlovac ===
The Pavlovac Monastery was built by despot Stefan Lazarević, sometime between 1415 and 1419, with some sources claiming 1425 as the correct year. Serbian Orthodox Church officially adopted 1417 as the construction year and in July and August 2017 celebrated monastery's 600th anniversary. In the vicinity of the monastery are remains of the Roman cemetery, and the area was the favorite hunting ground of despot Stefan. The monastery is dedicated to the Translations of Relics of Saint Nicholas. It was named after the nearby creek of Pavlovački Potok and, today non-existing, village of Pavlovci. The village and the monastery were mentioned in the letter which despot Stefan sent to the Republic of Ragusa on 21 November 1424. As the monastery was situated on the road leading to Belgrade it was often damaged by the advancing armies. After the collapse of the Serbian Despotate in 1459, it was razed by the Turks. The monastery is mentioned in the 1536 census of the villages in the Belgrade Nahiyah, sub-division of Sanjak of Smederevo. One of the last services, held by the fleeing Serbs from during the Great migration of Serbs before crossing the Sava and Danube into Austria, was held in Pavlovac in 1690. The monks remained in the monastery which was then razed and burned by the Turks, killing the brethren. Archaeological works and protection of the monastery began in 1967 and it was fully restored in 1990. That same year the monks returned to Pavlovac.

The design of the monastery differs from the typical style of the day. The central object in the complex is the church with the square based narthex, which can be classified as the representative of the Morava architectural school. Surrounding the church were the konak, the dining room with the monastic cells and the kitchen, all in ruins today. Of the konak, in the northern part of the monastery ground, only foundations survived, and the restoration is planned. The church was built in an unusual way, from the large slabs of stone positioned vertically while the hollows of the walls were filled with the trpanac stone, smaller rock pieces. The style of the entire complex is the mix of the local style and the maritime style from the Adriatic (Kotor and Dubrovnik). The monastery was declared a cultural monument.

=== Tresije ===
The Tresije Monastery was built by the king Stefan Dragutin in 1309. It was dedicated to the archangels Michael and Gabriel and named after the nearby stream of Tresije. It was demolished and rebuilt several times. It was rebuilt soon after the Serbian Patriarchate of Peć was restored in the 16th century. It had 10 monks, which was a rarity at the time, and despite the Ottoman rule, the monastery managed to preserve its relics and was quite distinguished. In the mid-16th century, Ottoman census mentions the monastery as having the largest brethren in the entire Pashalik of Belgrade.

It was rebuilt in 1709 by the brethren of the Rakovica Monastery, but was demolished already in 1738. At the end of the 18th century, it was demolished and the reconstruction began in 1936. It was not finished due to World War II, and after the war, new Communist authorities took the materials from the monastery to build a hotel "Hajdučica" in the vicinity. Construction of the new konak, planned before the war, began in 1991 and the foundation stone, brought from the Mount Athos, was placed by Princess Elizabeth of Yugoslavia. In 2009 a celebration of the monastery's 700 years was held. The monastery is dedicated to the Holly Archangels.

Tresije became somewhat of a sensation after the local population started claims that the image of Mary, mother of Jesus began to appear on church's outer wall. The image allegedly appeared for several years before it disappeared. Monastery is sponsoring several cultural and artistic festivals, including "Under the linden trees of Tresije monastery", "Days of Milovan Vidaković and Frula festival.

== See also ==
- List of mountains in Serbia

== Sources ==
- Mala Prosvetina Enciklopedija, Third edition (1985); Prosveta; ISBN 86-07-00001-2
- Turističko područje Beograda, "Geokarta", 2007, ISBN 86-459-0099-8
