= Johann August Nösselt =

German Protestant theologian (1734–1807)

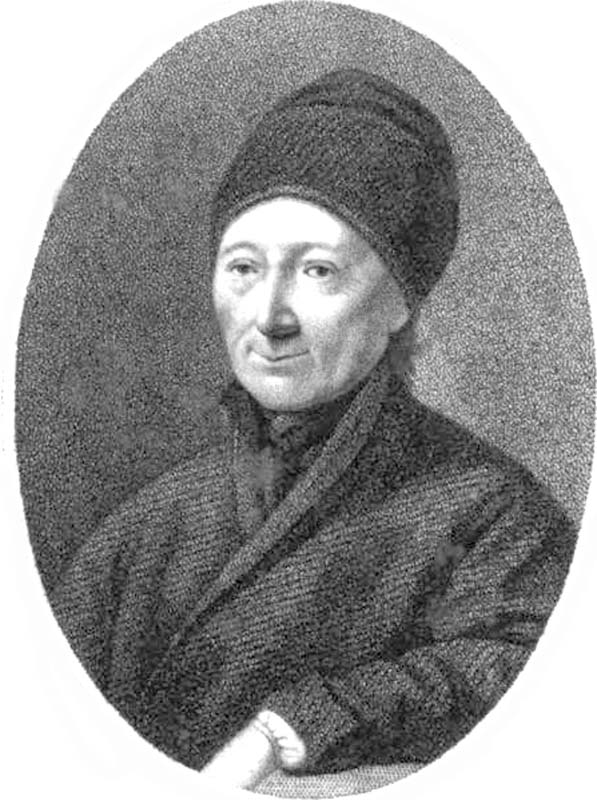
Johann August Nösselt (1734-1807)

Johann August Nösselt (2 May 1734, in Halle an der Saale – 11 March 1807) was a German Protestant theologian.

Beginning in 1751, he studied theology at the University of Halle, where one of his instructors was Siegmund Jakob Baumgarten (1706-1757). In 1755-56 he took an extended study trip throughout Germany, Switzerland and France, eventually returning to Halle, where in 1760 he became an associate professor of theology. In 1764 he attained the title of "full professor" at Halle.

Nösselt was in alliance with the popular Age of Enlightenment philosophy of his era, and is considered to be a significant representative in regards to the departure from 18th-century Protestant Pietistic orthodoxy and its rigid grammatical and historical interpretation of Biblical scripture. During his lifetime he was known for his work in the field of New Testament exegesis. He was the author of three collections of exegetical writings titled- "Opusculorum ad interpretationem Sacrarum Scripturarum fasciculi" (number I- 1785, number II- 1787 & number III- 1803). Other noted works by Nösselt include:

- Verteidigung der Wahrheit und Göttlichkeit der christlichen Religion, 1766 - Defense of the truth and divinity of the Christian religion.
- Anweisung zur Bildung angehender Theologen, 1785 - Instructions for the formation of upcoming theologians.
- Erklärung der Theologischen Facultät zu Halle über Dr. Bahrdt's Appellation an das Publikum, 1785 - Declaration of the theological faculty at Halle on Karl Friedrich Bahrdt's appeal to the audience.

From 1776 to 1790 he was publisher of the newspaper Hallischen gelehrten Zeitung.
