= Slavonic-Serbian =

Extinct Serbian literary language

- славено-сербскiй
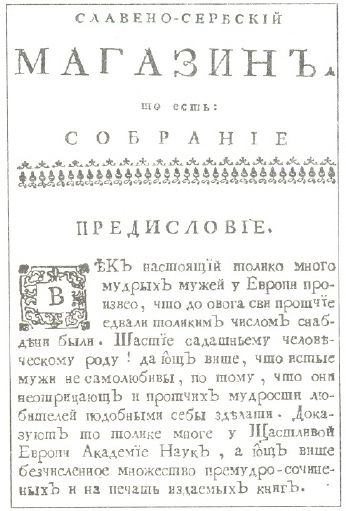
- Cover of the 1768 edition of the Slavenoserbskij Magazin
- Region: Vojvodina
- Era: 18th to 19th century
- Language family: Indo-European: Balto-Slavic; Slavic; South Slavic; Slavonic-Serbian
- Early form: Church Slavonic
- Writing system: Old Cyrillic alphabet

Language codes
- ISO 639-3: –

Slavonic-Serbian (славяносербскій, slavjanoserbskij), also known as Slavo-Serbian or Slaveno-Serbian (славено-сербскiй, slaveno-serbskij; Serbian: славеносрпски, slavenosrpski), was a literary language used by the Serbs in the Habsburg Empire, mostly in what is now Vojvodina, from the mid-18th century to the first decades of the 19th century, falling into obscurity by the 1870s. It was a linguistic blend of Church Slavonic of the Russian recension, vernacular Serbian (Shtokavian dialect), and Church Slavonic of the Serbian recension, with varying sources and differing attempts at standardisation.

== History ==
At the beginning of the 18th century, the literary language of the Serbs was the Serbian recension of Church Slavonic (also called Serbo-Slavonic), with centuries-old tradition. After the Great Serb Migration of 1690, many Serbs left Ottoman-held territories and settled in southern areas of the Kingdom of Hungary in the Habsburg Empire, mostly in what is now Vojvodina. The Serbian Orthodox Church in these areas was in need of liturgical books, and the Serbian schools were in need of textbooks. The Habsburg court, however, did not allow the Serbs to establish their printing presses. The Serbian Orthodox Church and schools received ample help in books and teachers from the Russian Empire. By the mid-18th century, Serbo-Slavonic had been mostly replaced with Russo-Slavonic (Russian recension of Church Slavonic) as the principal literary language of the Serbs.

Around that time, laymen became more numerous and notable than Orthodox monks and priests among active Serbian writers. The secular writers wanted their works to be closer to the general Serbian readership, but at the same time, most of them regarded Church Slavonic as more prestigious and elevated than the popular Serbian language. Church Slavonic was also identified with the Proto-Slavic language, and its use in literature was seen as the continuation of an ancient tradition. The writers began blending Russo-Slavonic, vernacular Serbian, and Russian, and the resulting mixed language is called Slavonic-Serbian. The first printed work in Slavonic-Serbian appeared in 1768, written by Zaharije Orfelin. Before that, a German–Slavonic-Serbian dictionary was composed in the 1730s. The blended language became dominant in secular Serbian literature and publications during the 1780s and 1790s.

At the beginning of the 19th century, it was rejected by Vuk Karadžić and his followers, whose reformatory efforts (focusing more on Serbian vernacular) formed modern literary Serbian based on the popular language.

Slavonic-Serbian was used in literary works, including prose and poetry, school textbooks, philological and theological works, popular scientific and practical books, and other kinds of publications, up to the 1820s and later more rarely. Various laws, decisions, and proclamations by the Habsburg authorities were printed in Slavonic-Serbian, in which also the first Serbian newspapers, Serbskija novini, appeared in 1791. Other periodicals include Slaveno-serbskij Magazin (1768) and Slaveno-serbskija vědomosti (1792–94), as well as the later Novine serbske iz carstvujuščega grada Vienne (1814–1817). A bidirectional German–Serbian dictionary (1791), with around 20,000 headwords in each direction, was composed by adapting a German–Russian dictionary into Slavonic-Serbian.

== Characteristics ==
Slavonic-Serbian texts exhibit lexical, phonological, morphological, and syntactical blending of Russo-Slavonic, vernacular Serbian, and, to a lesser degree, Russian; hybrid words are common. There are no definite rules determining how to combine elements from these languages. It mostly depends on the writer's linguistic attitude and the subject he writes about. So, in an Italian grammar written by Vikentije Ljuština, objects of everyday use are usually referred to by their Serbian names, while Russo-Slavonic names are used for religious holidays. During the short existence of Slavonic-Serbian, some forms became more or less standard, and the share of vernacular Serbian elements grew in it. Some authors argue that the application of Russo-Slavonic, Serbian, and Russian elements in a given work was regulated by stylistic conventions. In an individual sentence, the word stems or affixes could be either predominantly Serbian, or predominantly Russo-Slavonic, or combined in any other ratio. A sentence in the newspapers Slaveno-serbskija vědomosti, written by Stefan Novaković, is an example of elements from both languages being equally used, regarding both stems and affixes:

Slavonic-Serbian	Transliteration	Translation
Честь имамъ всѣмъ Высокопочитаемымъ Читателемъ обявити, да безъ сваке сумнѣ намѣренъ есамъ, ону достохвалну и цѣлому Сербскому Роду преполезну ИСТОРИЮ СЕРБСКУ, от коесамъ цѣло оглавленïе давно сообщïо, печатати.	Čest' imam vsěm Vysokopočitaemym Čitatelem objaviti, da bez svake sumně naměren esam, onu dostohvalnu i cělomu Serbskomu Rodu prepoleznu ISTORIJU SERBSKU, ot koesam cělo oglavlenie davno soobštio, pečatati.	I have the honour to announce to all Revered Readers that I am, without any doubt, intent on printing that praiseworthy and to all Serbian People valuable Serbian History, a whole chapter of which I have published long ago.
Modern Serbian	Transliteration	I have the honour to announce to all Revered Readers that I am, without any doubt, intent on printing that praiseworthy and to all Serbian People valuable Serbian History, a whole chapter of which I have published long ago.
Част имам објавити свим Високопоштованим Читаоцима да сам без сваке сумње намерен штампати ону доста хваљену и целоме Српском Роду прекорисну ИСТОРИЈУ СРПСКУ, од које сам цело поглавље давно саопштио.	Čast imam objaviti svim Visokopoštovanim Čitaocima da sam bez svake sumnje nameren štampati onu dosta hvaljenu i celome Srpskom Rodu prekorisnu ISTORIJU SRPSKU, od koje sam celo poglavlje davno saopštio.	I have the honour to announce to all Revered Readers that I am, without any doubt, intent on printing that praiseworthy and to all Serbian People valuable Serbian History, a whole chapter of which I have published long ago.

== See also ==
- Outline of Slavic history and culture
- List of Slavic studies journals
- Serbian Church Slavic

== Sources ==
- Albijanić, Aleksandar (1985). "The Demise of Serbian Church Slavic and the advent of the Slaveno-Serbski Literary Dialect". The Formation of the Slavonic literary Languages. Columbus, Ohio: Slavica Publishers. pp. 115–123.
- Albin, Alexander (1970). "The Creation of the Slaveno-Serbski Literary Language". The Slavonic and East European Review. 48 (113): 483–491.
- Ćirković, Sima (2004). The Serbs. Malden: Blackwell Publishing.
- Gudkov, Vladimir Pavlovich (1993). Сербская лексикография XVIII века [Serbian Lexicography of the 18th Century] (in Russian). Moscow: Philological Faculty of the Moscow State University.
- Ivanova, Najda (2010). Славеносрпски језик између 'простоте' и 'совершенства' [Slaveno-Serbian Language between 'Simplicity' and 'Perfection']. Južnoslovenski Filolog (in Serbian). 66 (66). Belgrade: Institute for the Serbian Language of the Serbian Academy of Sciences and Arts: 255–268. doi:10.2298/JFI1066255I. ISSN 0350-185X.
- Ivić, Pavle (1995). "Standard Language as an Instrument of Culture and the Product of National History". The History of Serbian Culture. Edgware: Porthill Publishers. pp. 41–51.
- Ivić, Pavle (2024). The Serbian people and their language (PDF). Novi Sad: Matica Srpska. Archived from the original on 2025-12-29.
- Ivić, Pavle; Pešikan, Mitar (1995). "Serbian printing". The History of Serbian Culture. Edgware: Porthill Publishers. pp. 137–145.
- Milićev, Tatjana (2023). "Verb-Final Orders in Slavonic-Serbian: Linguistic Factors" (PDF). Зборник Матице српске за филологију и лингвистику. 66 (1): 43–62. Archived from the original on 2025-12-29.
- Paxton, Roger V. (1981). "Identity and Consciousness: Culture and Politics among the Habsburg Serbs in the Eighteenth Century". Nation and Ideology: Essays in Honor of Wayne S. Vucinich. Boulder, Colorado: East European Monographs. pp. 101–120.
