= Sasha Skenderija =

Bosnian-American poet (born 1968)

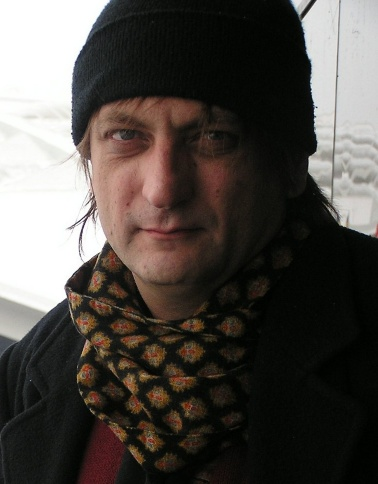
- Born: 4 July 1968 (age 58); Vitez, Bosnia and Herzegovina, SFR Yugoslavia
- Education: University of Sarajevo; Charles University
- Occupations: Poet; Author
- Known for: Poetry; Lyrics

Sasha Skenderija (born 4 July 1968) is a Bosnian-American poet currently residing in Prague.

== Biography ==
Skenderija began publishing poetry, prose and criticism in Bosnian (Serbo-Croatian) in the late 1980s, graduating from the University of Sarajevo in 1991. After surviving six months of the siege of Sarajevo, he fled to Prague, where he received a Ph.D. in Information Science from Charles University (1997). In 1999, with the help of translator and Cornell University linguistics professor Wayles Browne, Skenderija arrived in Ithaca, New York. He relocated to New York City in 2010 and lived in Astoria, Queens. He now lives in Prague, Czech Republic while working for the Czech National Library of Technology.

Skenderija is one of the most renowned Bosnian poets born since 1960, and his work confronts a range of experience, from the quotidian to the polemical, while pushing the boundaries of the genre. He ranks among the Bosnian poets with the most English-language reviews.

== Works ==
=== Books of poetry (Bosnian) ===
- Golo O
- Kako naslikati žar-pticu
- Ništa nije kao na filmu
- Praški fraktali
- Zašto je patuljak morao biti ustrijeljen
- Rt Dobre Nade

=== Books of poetry (English translation) ===
- Why the Dwarf Had to be Shot.
- Cape of Good Hope

=== Poems in Anthologies ===
His poetry has been included in several Bosnian and Croatian anthologies and translated into Czech, English, Macedonian and Slovenian:

- Prague Tales: A Collection of Central European Contemporary Writing,
- Absinthe, New European Writing,
- There is Less and Less Space: Panorama of the Newest Bosnian Poetry (in Bosnian),
- Scar on the Stone: Contemporary Poetry from Bosnia,
- Conan Lives Here: Young Bosnian Poetry 1992-1996 (in Croatian),
- Messages from the Bottom of the Night: Literature of Bosnia and Herzegovina under Siege and in Exile (in Czech),
- The Passion of Difference/Dark Sound of Emptiness: Croatian Poetry of the 1990s (in Croatian)

English translations of his poems have also been included in:

- Balkan Visions and Silver Visions II,
- Witness
- Like a Fragile Index of the World: Poems for David Skorton
- Spirit of Bosnia
- The City That Never Sleeps: Poems of New York

Skenderija also contributed lyrics to three albums of the cult Sarajevo techno-industrial band SCH (VRIL, 2002; Eat This!, 2004; and Dance, 2007).
