= Milorad =

- Pronunciation: Serbian pronunciation: [mîlorad]
- Gender: male

Origin
- Origin: Slavic
- Region of origin: Serbia

Milorad (Cyrillic script: Милорад; Polish: Miłorad) is a Serbian masculine given name derived from the Slavic elements: milo meaning "gracious, dear" and rad meaning "happy, eager".

Its feminine form is Milorada. Nicknames for Milorad include Milo, Miłosz, Radek, Radko, and Rada.

== Notable people with the name ==
- Milorad Arsenijević (1906–1987), Serbian football player and manager
- Milorad B. Protić (1911–2001), Serbian astronomer
- Milorad Bajović (born 1964), Montenegrin footballer
- Milorad Balabanović (born 1990), Serbian footballer
- Milorad Bata Mihailović (1923–2011), Serbian painter
- Milorad Belić (1940–2020), Serbian lawyer and basketball player
- Milorad Bilbija (born 1964), Bosnian Serb professional footballer
- Milorad Bojic (1951–2016), Serbian professor
- Milorad Bukvić (born 1976), Serbian footballer
- Milorad Čavić (born 1984), Serbian swimmer
- Milorad Čikić (born 1950), Serbian sprinter
- Milorad Dabić (born 1991), Serbian footballer
- Milorad Dimitrijević (1926–2009), Serbian geologist
- Milorad Dodik (born 1959), Bosnian Serb politician, President of Republika Srpska
- Milorad Đurđević (born 1940), Serbian politician
- Milorad M. Drachkovitch (1921–1996), Serbian-American political scientist
- Milorad Dragićević (1904–1975), Serbian footballer
- Milorad Drašković (1871–1923), Serbian politician
- Milorad Ekmečić (1928–2015), Serbian historian
- Milorad Erkić (1932–2009), Serbian basketball player and coach
- Milorad Gajović (born 1974), Montenegrin amateur boxer
- Milorad Gođevac (1860–1933), Serbian Chetnik
- Milorad Janjuš (born 1982), Serbian footballer
- Milorad Janković (1940–2020), Serbian footballer
- Milorad Karalić (born 1946), Serbian handball player
- Milorad Knežević (1936–2005), Serbian chess grandmaster
- Milorad Kojić (born 1999), Serbian footballer
- Milorad Korać (born 1969), Serbian footballer
- Milorad Kosanović (1951–2026), Serbian football player and manager
- Milorad Krivokapić (handballer) (born 1980), Serbian-Hungarian handballer
- Milorad Krivokapić (water polo) (born 1956), Montenegrin water polo player
- Milorad Kukoski (born 1987), Macedonian handball player
- Milorad Mažić (born 1973), Serbian football referee
- Milorad Mijatović (born 1947), Serbian politician
- Milorad Milinković (1965–2025), Serbian film director and screenwriter
- Milorad Milutinović (1935–2015), Serbian football player and manager
- Milorad Mirčić (1956–2025), Serbian politician
- Milorad Mitrović (1908–1993), Serbian footballer
- Milorad Mitrović, (born 1949), Serbian football coach and player
- Milorad Mitrović (1867–1907), Serbian poet
- Milorad Mišković (politician) (born 1948), Serbian politician
- Milorad Mišković (1928–2013), Serbian ballet dancer and choreographer
- Milorad Mladenović (born 1966), Serbian artist and architect
- Milorad Nedeljković (1883–1961), Serbian economist and Axis-collaborating politician
- Milorad Nikolić (1920–2006), Serbian footballer
- Milorad Pavić (footballer) (1921–2005), Serbian football player and coach
- Milorad Pavić (writer) (1929–2009), Serbian writer and academic
- Milorad Pavlović-Krpa (1865—1957), Serbian writer and publicist
- Milorad Pejić (born 1960), Bosnian poet
- Milorad Peković (born 1977), Montenegrin footballer
- Milorad Petrović (actor) (1865–1928), Serbian stage performer
- Milorad Petrović (1882–1981), Yugoslav lieutenant general
- Milorad Popović (1979–2006), Serbian footballer
- Milorad Popović Šapčanin (1841—1895), Serbian poet and writer
- Milorad Pupovac (born 1955), Croatian politician and linguist
- Milorad Rajović (1955–2016), Serbian footballer
- Milorad Ratković (born 1964), Bosnian Serb footballer
- Milorad Roganović (born 1951), Serbian journalist and sociology professor
- Milorad Sekulović (1950–2013), Serbian player and manager
- Milorad Simić (born 1946), Serbian philologist and linguist
- Milorad Sokolović (1922–1999), Serbian basketball player and coach
- Milorad Soldatović (born 1964), Serbian politician
- Milorad Stajić (born 2002), Bosnian professional footballer
- Milorad Stanulov (born 1953), Serbian rower
- Hadži Milorad Stošić (born 1954), Serbian politician
- Milorad Trbić (born 1958), Bosnian Serb military commander
- Milorad Ulemek (born 1968), Serbian military commander and criminal
- Milorad Unković (1945–2013), Serbian politician
- Milorad Vučelić (born 1948), Serbian journalist and businessman
- Milorad Vujičić (1869–1936), Serbian lawyer and politician
- Milorad Zečević (born 1972), Serbian footballer
- Milorad Živković (born 1963), Bosnian Serb politician and medical doctor
- Milorad Žižić (born 1986), Montenegrin boxer

== See also ==
- Slavic names
