= SCH =

SCH or Sch may refer to:

- A Scholar of Trinity College, Dublin
- Sch (trigraph), the German trigraph for 'sh' as in 'fish'
- Schizophrenia, a psychiatric diagnosis
- SCH Synchronization Channel, a GSM Um radio interface channel
- Schutzhund, a dog sport
- Schedule, in systems of pipe sizes
- Sigma Chi, a North American collegiate fraternity
- Succinylcholine, a neuromuscular blocking drug
- Sch. (Scheinergrade aka Degree Scheiner), an obsolete scale for measuring film speeds established by Julius Scheiner
- .sch (file extension), used for circuit diagram files by several design automation programs
- .sch, a second-level domain
- Sub-Conjunctival hemorrhage

== Music ==
- SCH (band), an Industrial rock band from Sarajevo
  - SCH (album), their 1987 self-titled album
- SCH (rapper), a French rapper

== Hospitals ==
- Cheshire Home, Shatin, an infirmary in Shatin, Hong Kong (see list of hospitals in Hong Kong and New Territories East Cluster)
- St. Cloud Hospital, an American hospital in St. Cloud, Minnesota
- Sydney Children's Hospital, a children's hospital in the Eastern Suburbs of Sydney, New South Wales, Australia

== Transportation ==
- Schenectady County Airport, a public airport in Schenectady County, New York
- Scotstounhill railway station, a railway station in Glasgow, Scotland

== Abbreviations ==
- Sydney Congress Hall, a Salvation Army Corps in Sydney, Australia
- Singapore Conference Hall
- Singular cardinals hypothesis, a concept in set theory
- Specialist Computer Holdings, parent company of SCC
- Sub-conjunctival haemorrhage
- Space Center Houston, the official visitors center of Lyndon B. Johnson Space Center
- Santander Central Hispano, formerly a brand name of Banco Santander Central Hispano, now Banco Santander
- System Controller Hub, an Intel chipset component
- Soonchunhyang University, a private university in South Korea
- The category of schemes
