= Milorad Mitrović =

Milorad Mitrović may refer to:

- Milorad Mitrović (footballer, born 1908) (1908–1993), Serbian footballer
- Milorad Mitrović (footballer, born 1949), Serbian footballer
- Milorad Mitrović (poet) (1867–1907), Serbian poet

== See also ==
- Milorad
- Mitrović
