= During Wartime... Again! =

DURING WARTIME... AGAIN!

Remix album by SCH
- Released: 1999
- Recorded: 1998–1999
- Genre: Alternative dance; electro-industrial
- Label: Polikita Records
- Producer: Senad Hadžimusić Teno

SCH chronology
The Gentle Art of Firing (1995)	DURING WARTIME... AGAIN! (1999)	VRIL (2002)

Professional ratings
Review scores
Source	Rating
Samir Šestan: During Wartime - Again!, Culture, 1999	(not rated)
Rajko Muršič: Nuničljivi duh sarajevskih SCH, Muska, Ljubljana 1999	(not rated)

During Wartime... Again! (1999) is the Teno's remix and the 10th anniversary re-release of the SCH's album During Wartime from 1989. The release contains 8 bonus tracks, mostly remixes of the earlier, both previously released and unreleased SCH work. The record was accompanied by a booklet of the band's most successful lyrics, entitled "SCH - Songs & Tales" (reprinted edition that was first published in 1996 in Prague).

Samir Šestan, in GRAFIT, notes that, in this album, SCH's music is "calmer and less painful" and that During Wartime...Again! offers "a new version of the old, a change that is not real, and it is being done according to the best SCH tradition - fusing political and aesthetic messages.

== Track listing ==
1. "Vagabonds"
2. "The Day When I Was Born"
3. "Ne dozvoli da zaboravim"
4. "Zbogom"
5. "Master"
6. "Hymn"
7. "Partija naša"
8. "F.LJ.P.# 7"

+ bonus

1. "F.LJ.P. 3"
2. "Happy Family"
3. "Our Song 1"
4. "Our Song 2"
5. "Smjena"
6. "Fagot"
7. "O Deutsche"
