= The Gentle Art of Firing =

Studio album by SCH
- Released: 1995
- Recorded: 1992–1993
- Genre: Alternative rock
- Label: Obala Art Centre
- Producer: Senad Hadžimusić Teno

SCH chronology
White Music (1992)	The Gentle Art of Firing (1995)	During Wartime... Again! (1999)

The Gentle Art of Firing is the fourth official studio album by SCH from 1995. It is a recording of music produced in Sarajevo during the first year of war in Bosnia and was one of the first albums released in the besieged city. The recording line-up was Teno (vocals/guitar/bass), Petar Erak (bass/sax), and Danijel Prebanić (drums).

In his review of the album in the weekly BH Dani, the film director Srđan Vuletić comments on how it provides commentary on the situation in Sarajevo at that time, playing the role of observer: "Where During Wartime and White Music were totally engaged, a musical fist in the eye, The Gentle Art of Firing is a hand that gently, slightly sorrowfully, strokes us, but one that does not point in any direction."

== Track listing ==
1. "I Know You"
2. "She"
3. "Farewell"
4. "Wir Sind Ein Fehler"
5. "Our Song"
6. "Vagabonds"
7. "Chaos"
8. "Fall Down - Get Up"
9. "I Never Did Love You"
