= Wayles Browne =

American linguist (born 1941)

E. Wayles Browne
- Born: July 19, 1941 (age 85); Washington, D.C.
- Education: Harvard University; MIT; University of Zagreb
- Occupations: Professor emeritus of linguistics, translator
- Employer: Cornell University
- Known for: Slavic languages General linguistics Translation

Eppes Wayles Browne III (born July 19, 1941) is a linguist, Slavist, translator and editor of Slavic journals in several countries. Browne is a professor emeritus of linguistics at Cornell University, with research interests in Slavic and general linguistics, notably the study and analysis of Serbo-Croatian, where he is one of the leading Western scholars.

== Biography ==
Browne was born in Washington, DC, the son of Eppes Wayles Browne Jr. (1909–1980) and Virginia (née Senders) Browne (1909–2011). Browne's Slavic studies began with his undergraduate career at Harvard University (A.B., 1963, in linguistics and Slavic languages), and continued with graduate work at Massachusetts Institute of Technology and the University of Novi Sad (then in SFR Yugoslavia), culminating in a Ph.D. degree (dated 1980, defended in January 1981, and awarded in 1983) from the University of Zagreb. He studied with some of the finest linguists and Slavicists of the 20th century, including Roman Jakobson, Horace G. Lunt, Morris Halle, and Pavle Ivić. His dissertation, directed by Rudolf Filipović, was entitled Relativna rečenica u hrvatskom ili srpskom jeziku u poređenju s engleskom situacijom ("Relative Clauses in the Croatian or Serbian Language in Comparison with the English Situation") and is one of the first serious attempts to analyze Serbo-Croatian syntax within a generative grammar framework. It was later published in revised form, in 1986, as Relative Clauses in Serbo-Croatian, as part of the Zagreb English–Serbo-Croatian Contrastive Project, by the Institute of Linguistics of University of Zagreb.

Besides his present position at Cornell, where he has taught since 1974, Browne has taught at Brown University and Yale University. He has also held research positions at MIT and at the University of Zagreb.

== Linguistics ==
Browne's main interests lie in the syntax of Serbo-Croatian and other South Slavic languages (with particular attention to relative clauses, clitic placement rules, and complement clauses) and in the contributions data from these languages can make to theoretical work in general linguistics. He has also published works on the topic of the Balkan language area, Slavic historical grammar, comparative and contrastive grammar, and pedagogical grammar.

He served as the co-editor of Annual Workshop on Formal Approaches to Slavic Linguistics: the Cornell Meeting, 1995 (Michigan Slavic Publications, 1997), and has authored more than 65 articles and 20 reviews, covering topics not just in Serbo-Croatian and South Slavic linguistics but also in Slavic linguistics more generally (including work on Russian and on Czech) and in linguistic theory.

As part of a team of scholars, described by the Slavic and Balkan languages professor Christina Kramer as "each recognized internationally in his language area", he wrote the widely cited definitive sketch of Serbo-Croatian grammar: "Serbo-Croat" (pp. 306–387 in The Slavonic Languages, B. Comrie and G. Corbett, eds., Routledge Publishers, 1993). Several reviewers commented favorably on Browne's contribution: Roland Sussex considered it superior to an independent monograph on the same language, while Edna Andrews wrote in her review of the book's 2002 second edition, "Wayles Browne does an outstanding job ... and his contribution continues to be one of the best in the field." Browne has also served as linguistics editor for The Slavic and East European Journal.

In the introduction to the recently published book A Linguist's Linguist: Studies in South Slavic Linguistics in Honor of E. Wayles Browne that "brings together a leading cohort of specialists in South Slavic linguistics to celebrate Wayles Browne's body of works in this area," the editors Steven Franks, Vrinda Chidambaram, and Brian Joseph described Wayles Browne's as "a unique and almost irreplaceable intellectual resource for specialists in Slavic linguistics, working on a myriad of topics in a variety of languages and from a range of theoretical perspectives. He has been a subtle yet persistent force in bringing Slavic puzzles to the attention of the larger world of linguists and in defining the larger significance of these puzzles."

In general linguistics, Browne has done research in syntax, morphology, and phonology as well as in relative clauses and other subordinate clauses, interrogatives, clitic rules, word order, reflexive verbs, and accent rules, publishing numerous pieces in such major journals as Balkanistica, Folia Slavica, and Linguistic Inquiry.

His work The Cambridge Handbook of Slavic Linguistics (along with editor Danko Šipka) won the 2025 AATSEEL award for Best Contribution in Second Language Acquisition.

== Translations ==
Browne's literary translations are mostly from Serbo-Croatian varieties (Bosnian, Croatian, Serbian). He has been the principal English translator and editor for the Bosnian poet Sasha Skenderija since 1993, and he has also translated the works of Mak Dizdar, Izet Sarajlić, Milorad Pejić and others. Browne has also translated Croatian scholarly works, and translates from or teaches other South Slavic languages, in addition to Polish, Czech, Russian, Belarusian, Rusyn, and Old Church Slavonic.

== Personal life and views ==
In 1994, Browne and his wife provided accommodation at their home for a student refugee from the Bosnian War, who arrived in the United States as part of a scheme organised by the Fellowship of Reconciliation. He later criticised the 1999 NATO bombing of Yugoslavia for its effect on civilians, while acknowledging, "if somebody is going to intervene militarily, Slobodan Milošević is a very good person to intervene against."

== Works ==
=== Major work in linguistics ===
- Browne, W. (1975). Numerous articles. In R. Filipovic (Ed.), Contrastive analysis of English and Serbo-Croatian I. Zagreb.
- Browne, W. (1986). Relative Clauses in Serbo-Croatian in Comaparison with English. Zagreb.
- Browne, W. (1990). Turkisms in the Balkans: True and false friends. Languages in Contact. Zagreb.
- Browne, W. (1993). Serbo-Croat. In B. Comrie and G. Corbett (Eds.), The Slavonic Languages. London.
- Browne, Wayles; Alt, Theresa (2004). A Handbook of Bosnian, Serbian, and Croatian (PDF). SEELRC.
- Browne, Wayles and Danko Šipka (ed.) (2024), The Cambridge Handbook of Slavic Linguistics. Cambridge Publishing, London.

=== Selected literary translations ===
- "Why the Dwarf Had to be Shot (selection)," with Sasha Skenderija and Aaron Tate, in Absinthe: New European Writing (Issue 5, March 2006)
- DARK BLUE RIVER by Mak Dizdar (2007), Spirit of Bosnia, Vol. 2, No. 3
- On the One-Way Street, with a Dog, Picture Postcard, Common Places, Wintertime Scene, 2008), Spirit of Bosnia, Vol. 3, No. 2
