= Bojić =

Bojić may refer to:

- Bojić, Šabac, a village in Serbia
- Bojić (surname), a South Slavic surname
