= Bojić (surname) =

Bojić is a South-Slavic language surname. It may be written without diacritics as Bojic or transcribed as Bojich.

== Geographical distribution ==
As of 2014, 46.0% of all known bearers of the surname Bojić were residents of Serbia, 24.3% of Bosnia and Herzegovina, 9.7% of Croatia, 5.8% of Montenegro and 2.4% of Slovenia. In these countries, the frequency of the surname was as follows:

- 1. Montenegro (1: 1,025)
- 2. Serbia (1: 1,485)
- 3. Bosnia and Herzegovina (1: 1,491)
- 4. Croatia (1: 4,248)
- 5. Slovenia (1: 8,125)

== Notable people ==
- Andrija Bojić (born 1993), Serbian basketball player
- Bogdan Bojić (born 1999), Montenegrin basketball player
- Dubravko Bojić (born 1953), Serbian politician+
- Lazar Bojić (1791–1859), Serbian writer and priest
- Marko Bojić (born 1988), Montenegrin volleyball player
- Milorad Bojic, Serbian scientist
- Milovan Bojić (born 1955), Serbian politician
- Milutin Bojić (1892–1917), Serbian poet and playwright
- Nik Bojic (born 1992), Australian high jumper
- Pedj Bojić (born 1984), Australian footballer
- Petar Bojić (born 1991), Serbian footballer
- Raško Bojić (born 1964), Serbian basketball coach
- Slobodan Bojic (born 1992), Montenegrin volleyball player
