= SCH Dirty Lo-Fi Archive 1984–2008 =

SCH DIRTY LO-FI ARCHIVE 1984–2008

Video by SCH
- Released: 2008
- Recorded: 1984–2008
- Genre: Alternative rock; punk rock; hardcore punk; post-punk; industrial; noise
- Label: Polikita Records
- Producer: Senad Hadžimusić Teno

SCH chronology
DANCE (2007)	SCH DIRTY LO-FI ARCHIVE 1984–2008 (2008)

Professional ratings
Review scores
Source	Rating
pair.com	link

SCH Dirty Lo-Fi Archive 1984–2008 is a 4-DVD SET collection by SCH, including shots recorded "nomatterhow", gigs, TV interviews, promotional clips, and other archival material documenting 25 years of the existence and work of the Sarajevo alternative rock band.

== Bonus Material ==
- SCH Live at Mochvara (DVD)

Concert in Zagreb, on 13 March 2008

- SCH Video Compilation (DVD)

A promo compilation of the full length 4-DVD set
