= Only Cunts Don't Fear the Rain =

ONLY CUNTS DON'T FEAR THE RAIN

Compilation album by SCH
- Released: 2006
- Recorded: 1983–1993
- Genre: Alternative rock; punk rock; new wave; folk
- Label: Polikita Records
- Producer: Senad Hadžimusić Teno

SCH chronology
Deluge and After (2006)	ONLY CUNTS DON'T FEAR THE RAIN (2006)	SCH Live (2007)

Professional ratings
Review scores
Source	Rating
Selvedin Avdić: Ko se boji kiše, StartBiH, July 2006	link

Only Cunts Don't Fear the Rain is the ninth official album by SCH. It is a compilation of unreleased punk and rock compositions made during the period 1983-1993, never considered as the main SCH repertoire.

Selvedin Avdić, in Start BiH, states: "This album is a reminder of the war path and battles fought by that most persistent of underground warriors and equally essential listening for any young fans unaware of SCH’s pre-digital past."

== Track listing ==
1. "Znamo sve"
2. "Djevojke su gole"
3. "Tablete"
4. "Oh što je to tako"
5. "Back to the USSR"
6. "Naša pjesma"
7. "Baying cur"
8. "You stab me in the back"
9. "It's midnight"
10. "Early morning"
11. "The day we'd met each other again "
12. "He takes my 'something' three times a day from 6 to 11"
13. "Act 1"
14. "Narodnjak" (bonus track)
