= SCH (album) =

Studio album by SCH
- Released: 1987
- Recorded: 1985–1987
- Genre: Alternative rock; industrial rock; noise rock
- Label: Independent Edition; Založba FV
- Producer: Senad Hadžimusić Teno

SCH chronology
SCH (1987)	During Wartime (1989)

Professional ratings
Review scores
Source	Rating
Ognjen Tvrtković, Naši dani, Sarajevo, 1987	not rated
Branimir Lokner, Stav, Novi Sad, 1988	not rated
Saša Leskovac, Valter, Sarajevo, 1988	not rated

SCH is the first official album by SCH. The album was released following the band's successful appearance at the 1987 Novi Rock festival in Ljubljana. The recording line-up was Teno (vocals/guitar/bass/synth/noises), Samir Bjelanović (drums), and Petar Erak (bass).

The album is characterized by powerful expression, a mixture of refined noise, industrial sounds and totally ruptured tones full of breaks and twists, interfused with short melodic phrases and pieces. The band's political engagement is already in evidence - as the Slovenian independent journalist and rock critic Marjan Ogrinc remarked: "The sonic effects of this music utterly embody the question of power, authority, the personal introversion of social exteriors, domination and submission, freedom."

== Track listing ==
1. "We Are A Fault"
2. "Happy Family"
3. "Majna"
4. "Smjena"
5. "Falše"
6. "Zavoj"
7. "St. materijal"
8. "F.LJ.P. 3"
9. "Kad se svrši sve"
