= Vril (disambiguation) =

Vril is a science fiction novel by Edward Bulwer-Lytton, first published in 1871 under the title The Coming Race.

Vril may also refer to:

- VRIL, a 2002 album by SCH
- Vril Dox, a DC Comics character, also known as Brainiac 2
- Vril Society, a pseudohistorical Nazi secret society founded in 1921
- Nazi UFO, an advanced aircraft/spacecraft supposedly developed by Nazi Germany during World War II
- Vril, or Vital Magnetism: Secret Doctrine of Ancient Atlantis, Egypt, Chaldea and Greece, a 1911 book by William Walker Atkinson
