= White Music (disambiguation) =

White Music is the 1978 debut album by XTC.

White Music may also refer to:

- White Music (Crack the Sky album)
- White Music (SCH album)
- White Music, a Thai record label
