= Jevtimije Ivanović =

Serbian priest and author

Jevtimije Ivanović (1773 – 1849) was a Serbian priest and author of four collections of biographies of notable individuals under the title Novi Plutarh (New Plutarch, 1809–1841).

== Biography ==
Ivanović was born in Sen Mikluš, Habsburg monarchy, today's Sinnicolau Mare, Romania. He graduated from the Serbian Orthodox Theological Seminary of Sremski Karlovci and for 38 years while in priesthood and teaching, he also translated and wrote biographies, published between 1809 and 1841. His first parish was in Šid, and in the Kuveždin Monastery, before he settled in 1812 in Zemun from where he retired in 1834.

A novelty in Serbian prose was secular biography at the time, which existed in older Serbian hagiographies, better known as žitije or vita. This trend would continue to develop fully and in direct correlation with classical works.

Ivanović was influenced by Dositej Obradović who wrote the first individual biographies, a genre that expanded to the form of a biographical collection modeled on popular European literature, the type of compilations that were developed by Cornelius Nepos, Sallust and Plutarch.

In 1809, Jevtimije Ivanović published in Buda his first collection of four books under the long title Novi Plutarh ili kratkoje opisanije slavnjejši ljudi sviju naroda and drevnjejši vremena do danas. Po Blanšaru i Šileru svobodno preveden i novimi biografijami umnožen Jeftimijem Ivanovićem(New Plutarch or abridged lives of the greatest men of all nations. According to Blanchard and Schiller freely translated and with new biographies added by Jevtimije Ivanović). It is a very free translation, perhaps even a translation-adaptation of the 1804 work of French biographer Pierre Blanchard (1772–1856). Ivanović translated this work from German, but he also used the works of the German writer Friedrich Schiller, adding the biographies of the great Serb men.

Only five years after Blanchard's original appeared in print in France, the general reader in Ottoman-occupied Serbia and Habsburg Monarchy was to see the first biographies of not only Plutarch but Homer, Voltaire, Socrates, Cicero, Plato, and others. About Homer, Ivanović wrote, "We know so little about him that the more we search the less we know", raising the Homeric Question.

Ivanović died in Sremska Mitrovica.

== See also ==
- Dositej Obradović
- Pavle Solarić
- Lazar Bojić
- Avram Mrazović
- Teodor Janković Mirijevski
- Atanasije Dimitrijević Sekereš
- Stefan Vujanovski
- Uroš Nestorović
- Dimitrie Eustatievici
- Djordje Natošević
