= Sipka =

Sipka (Šipka) is a Serbian and Croatian surname. Notable people with the surname include:

- Ágnes Sipka (born 1954), Hungarian long-distance runner
- Danko Sipka (born 1962), Serbian-American linguist
