= SCH Live =

SCH LIVE

Live album by SCH
- Released: 2007
- Recorded: 1990
- Genre: Alternative dance; industrial; noise
- Label: Listen Loudest
- Producer: Senad Hadžimusić Teno

SCH chronology
Only Cunts Don't Fear the Rain (2006)	SCH LIVE (2007)	DANCE (2007)

Professional ratings
Review scores
Source	Rating
terapija.net	link

SCH Live is the tenth official album by SCH, released in Zagreb in 2007. The album is a recording of a concert performed on 24 June 1990 in the Student Center Gallery in Zagreb. The line up was Petar Erak (bass), Rida Attarashani (drums), Sveto Ignjatović (synth, noises), and Teno (guitar, vocals).

"In this phase, SCH was strictly oriented towards a raw alternative post-punk sound with an emphasis on noise and industrial fragments and a heavy and slowly, evilly rolling rhythm," notes Vladimir Horvat on TerapijaNet.

== Track listing ==
1. "Kad se svrši sve"
2. "The Day When I Was Born"
3. "Ne dozvoli da zaboravim"
4. "Master"
5. "Partija naša"
