= Deluge and After =

Studio album by SCH
- Released: 2006
- Recorded: 2005–2006
- Genre: Alternative dance; electro-industrial; techno; IDM
- Length: 76:47
- Label: Buybook
- Producer: Senad Hadžimusić Teno

SCH chronology
Eat This! (2004)	Deluge and After (2006)	Only Cunts Don't Fear the Rain (2006)

Professional ratings
Review scores
Source	Rating
BH Dani	(not rated) Samir Šestan: Melanholični optimizam ili crno sunce na obzorju, BH Dani, March 2006
Selvedin Avdić: Deluge and After, StartBiH, 4 April 2006	(not rated)
Mirza Gazibegović: Deluge and After, INFO Magazin, #100, May 2006	4/5 stars

Deluge and After is the eighth studio album by SCH, released in 2006.

It is the third album in SCH's most recent phase, which began in 2002. Mirza Gazibegović (INFO magazine) notes how it "...conjures up images of industry, noise reminiscent of factory machines, music created for robots of the future, robots capable of assimilating sound waves, capable of enjoying music."

The album features hypnotic rhythms, guitar segments, and vocal interpretations which, according to Samir Šestan, illustrate techno bereft of pathos, "...blending diverse interests and creatively reinterpreting numerous musical genres."

Selvedin Avdić (Start BiH) finds the album more accessible than other SCH works: "The guitar even has a likeable, danceable, almost funky tone on some tracks here. Their miniature DJ set tracks 130 and Long Night at Roxy even whisk us to a bizarre SCH discotheque."

== Track listing ==
No.	Title	Length
1.	"Near You"	3:30
2.	"Not so Often"	4:10
3.	"Imdina"	7:23
4.	"130"	19:11
5.	"Long Night at Roxy"	28:02
6.	"Karim"	6:41
7.	"Karim 2"	4:03
8.	"Karim 3"	3:47
Total length:		76:47
