= Festivals of Slovenia =

Historically, among the most popular music festivals in Slovenia was the Slovenska popevka festival. Right after the World War II begun the long tradition of Jazz festivals in Slovenia, then part of the Titoist Yugoslavia, with the Jazz festival Ljubljana.

Between 1981 and 2000 the Novi Rock festival was notable for bringing rock music across the Iron Curtain from the West to the Slovenian and then Yugoslav audience.

A number of music, theater, film, festivals takes place in Slovenia each year, including Ljubljana Summer Festival, Lent Festival.
