= 2008–09 Eskişehirspor season =

Eskişehirspor
2008–09 season
- Chairman: (Turkey) Halil Ünal
- Manager: (Turkey) Rıza Çalımbay
- Süper Lig: 14th

Following are the results of the 2008–09 Eskişehirspor season. Eskişehirspor is a football club in Eskişehir, Turkey. Also known as Kırmızı Şimşekler (Red Lightnings) or The Star of Anatolia. The club was founded in 1965 and started a football revolution in Anatolia. Eskişehirspor started a long term stay in the first league in Turkey when they were founded.

== First-team squad ==
| Player | No | Year | Previous Team | Country |
|---|---|---|---|---|
Goalkeeper
| Vanja Ivesa | 1 | 2008 | Slaven Belupo | (Croatia) |
| Sinan Ören | 87 | 2004 | Altyapı | (Turkey) |
| Kayacan Erdoğan | 22 | 2006 | Altyapı | (Turkey) |
Defender
| Safet Nadarević (captain) | 13 | 2004 | NK Zagreb | (Bosnia and Herzegovina) |
| Ahmet Sağlam | 81 | 2008 | Eyüpspor | (Turkey) |
| Murat Önür | 46 | 2008 | Diyarbakırspor | (Turkey) |
| Luka Vucko | 27 | 2008 | Rijeka | (Turkey) |
| Koray Arslan | 51 | 2007 | Güngören Belediyespor | (Turkey) |
| Sezgin Coşkun | 75 | 2007 | Gaziantep Büyükşehir Belediyespor | (Turkey) |
| Bülent Ertuğrul | 55 | 2008 | Denizlispor | (Turkey) |
Midfielder
| Mustafa Sevgi | 26 | 2004 | Altyapı | (Turkey) |
| Özgür Öçal | 17 | 2008 | Kasımpaşaspor | (Turkey) |
| Mehmet Akif Tatlı | 25 | 2005 | Çorumspor | (Turkey) |
| Serkan Özdemir | 39 | 2007 | Diyarbakırspor | (Turkey) |
| Oğuz Sabankay | 14 | 2008 | Galatasaray | (Turkey) |
| Doğa Kaya | 20 | 2007 | Gençlerbirliği Oftaş | (Turkey) |
| Birol Hikmet | 5 | 2007 | Güngören Belediyespor | (Turkey) |
| Bülent Kocabey | 21 | 2008 | Gençlerbirliği Oftaş | (Turkey) |
| Stjepan Poljak | 15 | 2008 | Slaven Belupo | (Croatia) |
Striker
| Tayfun Türkmen | 33 | 2008 | Ankaraspor | (Turkey) |
| Ömer Yalçın (vice-captain) | 9 | 2007 | Gaziantep Büyükşehir Belediyespor | (Turkey) |
| Serdar Özbayraktar | 10 | 2007 | Gaziantep Büyükşehir Belediyespor | (Turkey) |
| Souleymane Youla | 11 | 2008 | Lille | (Guinea) |
| Anderson Ricardo Dos Santos | 7 | 2008 | Çaykur Rizespor | (Brazil) |
| Abdullah Halman | 99 | 2008 | Mersin İdman Yurdu | (Turkey) |
| Krunoslav Lovrek | 19 | 2008 | NK Zagreb | (Croatia) |
| Selçuk Alibaz | 38 | 2008 | SV Sandhausen | (Turkey) |

== Süper Lig Matches ==
Turkcell Süper Ligi
Day 1
23 August 2008
21.00

| İstanbul Büyükşehir Belediyespor | 0 - 0 | Eskişehirspor |
|---|---|---|
| - | Rapor | - |

Atatürk Olympic Stadium, Istanbul
Referee: Özgüç Türkalp
Turkcell Süper Ligi
Day 2
31 August 2008
21.00

| Eskişehirspor | 0 - 0 | Hacettepespor |
|---|---|---|
| - | Rapor | - |

Eskişehir Atatürk Stadı, Eskişehir
Referee: Hakan Özkan
Friendly match
6 September 2008
17.00

| Bursaspor | 1 - 3 | Eskişehirspor |
|---|---|---|
| 17' Gökhan Güleç | Rapor | 35' Kruno Lovrek; 58' Kruno Lovrek; 72' Abdullah Halman |

Vakıfköy Orhan Özselek, Bursa
Referee: Erbay Aldemir
Turkcell Süper Ligi
Day 3
14 September 2008
20.00

| Gençlerbirliği | 3 - 1 | Eskişehirspor |
|---|---|---|
| 7' Mustafa; 39' Erkan; 61' Mustafa | Rapor | 83' Özgür Öçal |

Ankara 19 Mayıs Stadı, Ankara
Referee: Aytekin Durmaz
Turkcell Süper Ligi
Day 4
20 September 2008
20.00

| Eskişehirspor | 2 - 2 | Sivasspor |
|---|---|---|
| 7' Sezgin Coşkun; 60' Krunoslav Lovrek | Rapor | 54' Musa; 75' Mehmet Yıldız; (red card) 86' Abdurrahman |

Eskişehir Atatürk Stadı, Eskişehir
Referee: İlker Maral
Turkcell Süper Ligi
Day 5
28 September 2008
20.00

| Kayserispor | - | Eskişehirspor |
|---|---|---|
| - | Rapor | - |

Kayseri Atatürk Stadı, Kayseri
Referee: Koray Gençerler
Turkcell Süper Ligi
Day 6
5 October 2008, 20.00

| Eskişehirspor | - | Kocaelispor |
|---|---|---|
| - | Rapor | - |

Eskişehir Atatürk Stadı, Eskişehir

== Standings ==
| Pos | Team | Pld | W | D | L | GF | GA | GD | Pts |
|---|---|---|---|---|---|---|---|---|---|
| 9 | İstanbul B.B. | 34 | 12 | 6 | 16 | 37 | 46 | −9 | 42 |
| 10 | Ankaraspor | 34 | 11 | 8 | 15 | 36 | 42 | −6 | 41 |
| 11 | Eskişehirspor | 34 | 10 | 10 | 14 | 45 | 49 | −4 | 40 (Note: Trabzonspor were ahead of Antalyaspor on head-to-head record: Eskişehirspor–Antalyaspor 2–0, Antalyaspor–Eskişehirspor 0–0.) |
| 12 | Antalyaspor | 34 | 10 | 10 | 14 | 34 | 42 | −8 | 40 |
| 13 | MKE Ankaragücü | 34 | 11 | 6 | 17 | 36 | 47 | −11 | 39 |

Rules for classification: 1st points; 2nd head-to-head points; 3rd head-to-head goal difference; 4th head-to-head goals scored; 5th head-to-head away goals scored; 6th goal difference; 7th goals scored
