= Steven Franks =

British-American linguist

- Citizenship: United Kingdom; United States
- Education: Princeton University, UCLA, Cornell University
- Known for: Generative syntax in the Slavic languages; Russian resyllabification
- Scientific career
- Fields: Linguistics; Slavic languages; generative grammar
- Workplaces: Indiana University
- Doctoral advisor: Wayles Browne

Steven Franks is a British-born American linguist and researcher in the fields of generative syntax and Slavistics. Franks received his Ph.D. at Cornell University in 1985. He has written numerous books and articles that have significantly contributed to Slavic linguistics. He is currently a professor of linguistics, Slavic languages and literatures, and cognitive science, as well as an adjunct professor of speech and hearing sciences at the Indiana University Bloomington and lives in Bloomington, Indiana with his family.

== Selected publications ==
- 1995: Parameters of Slavic Morphosyntax. New York/Oxford: Oxford University Press.
- 2000: Clitics in Slavic. With Tracy H. King. New York/Oxford: Oxford University Press
- 2017: Syntax and Spell-Out in Slavic. Bloomington, IN: Slavica Publishers.

== Awards ==
- 2000: AATSEEL Best Book in Linguistics for Clitics in Slavic. with Tracy Holloway King
