= Niowt =

Alternative art rock band from Slovenia

- Origin: Ljubljana, Slovenia
- Genres: experimental rock, indie rock, alternative rock
- Years active: 1992–present
- Labels: Chrom Records
- Members: Mojca Krevel; Peter Šenk

Niowt is an alternative rock band from Ljubljana, Slovenia. The band was founded in the early 1990's and was active until 2004. In 2020 the founding members Mojca Krevel (vocals, guitar) and Peter Šenk (synthesizers and keyboards) reunited with Slovenian multi-instrumentalist and producer Peter Penko (Coptic Rain, April Nine) and started with new releases in 2022.

== History ==
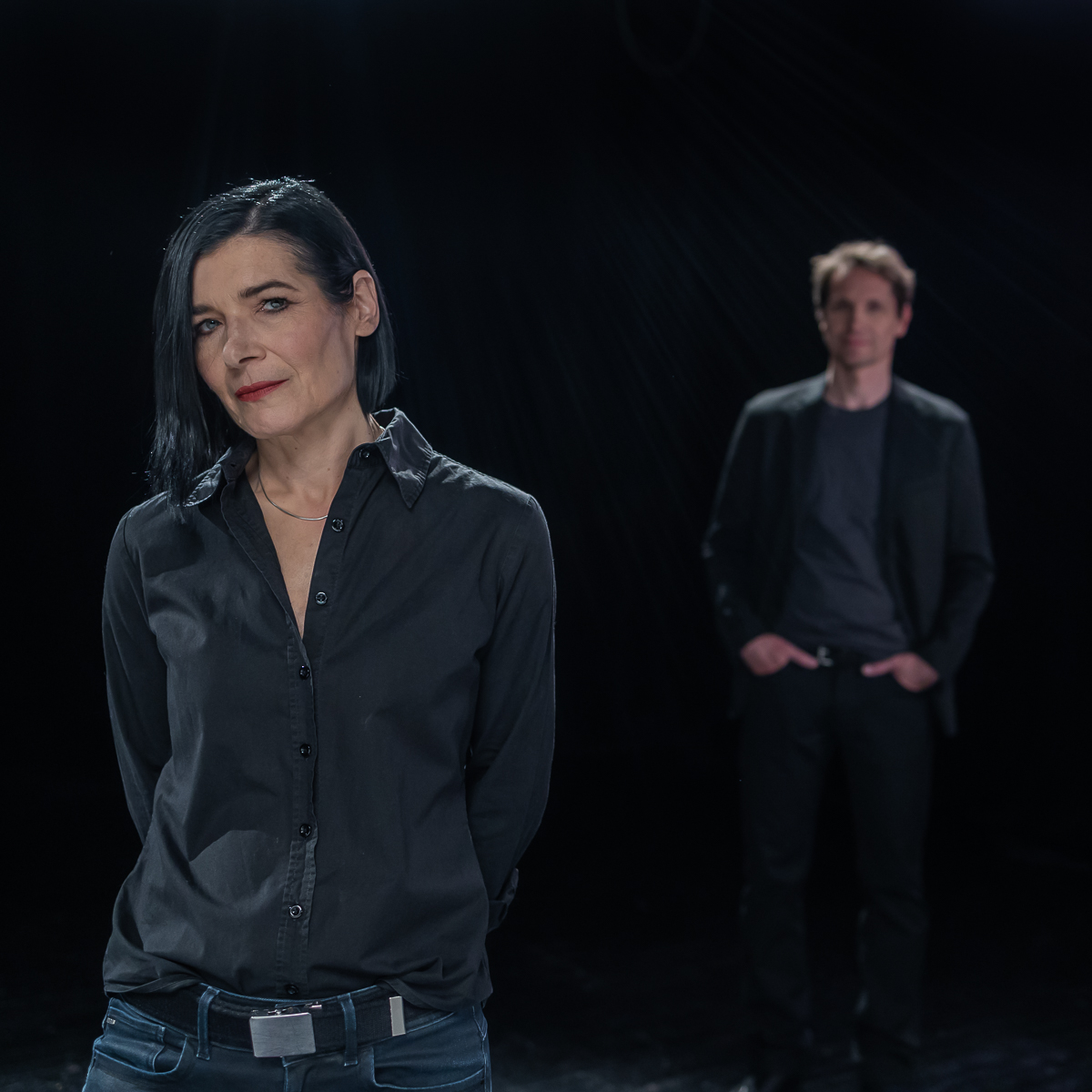
Niowt 2022

Mojca Krevel and Peter Šenk started collaborating in 1992 while working on a music score for a student theatre project by the now-renowned Slovene director Sebastijan Horvat. In 1994, the collaboration expanded with additional members and the band started performing live under the name Niowt.

Over the next two years the band performed in Slovenia and recorded several songs (produced by Janez Križaj) that found airplay on Slovene alternative radio stations. In 1996, after a successful performance at the Novi Rock Festival in Ljubljana., the band was contacted by musician and emerging producer Peter Penko, who offered to record and produce their material. The resulting 13 songs were released on their debut album Niowt, issued in 1997 by the German label Chrom Records. The album art and the song City played on the meaning of the band's name: "niowt" (now more commonly spelled as "niwt") is the supposed pronunciation of the hieroglyph for 'city'.

The album received positive reviews around Europe, and was described as an indie version of Garbage or the Siouxsie and the Banshees. Remixes of the songs from the album were included on various compilations. The release did not have a significant impact in Slovenia, and the band spent the next two years touring Europe and preparing material for the next album.

The second album, Loverboy, was recorded with Peter Penko in 1999 and 2000, and released by Chrom Records in 2001. Loverboy received positive reviews from critics around Europe, and was noticed also in Slovenia, where the band was associated with "alternative rock". Niowt presented the new material at several festivals around Europe (Wave Gothic Treffen in Germany, Beach Bum in Italy, Rock for People in Czech Republic) and concluded the tour with a concert at the Cankar Centre in Ljubljana. In 2000 Niowt opened for the Finnish band HIM in Tivoli Hall, which was Ljubljana's largest concert venue at the time. Their songs were included on several compilations. In 2003, after extensive touring, the band started preparing material for the third album. In the same year, they recorded 80 minutes of original music for the theatre play Play It Again, Caligula (directed by Matjaž Pograjc), and received the award for the best music score for a theatre play at the second Slovenian Festival of Chamber Theatre in Ptuj.

In 2004, the founding members Mojca Krevel and Peter Šenk decided to focus on their academic careers. Mojca occasionally collaborated with various Slovenian musicians (Xenia Ius, Warrego Valles, Werefox), but the band's activities were suspended until 2020, when Mojca and Peter reunited and started working on new songs.

Later that year Niowt reconnected with Peter Penko and started recording the new material. "Lamenting Venus", their first new single and video since 2004, was released in 2022, followed by "Bedtime Stories" in 2023. On November 30, 2024, Niowt (with Goran Koražija on guitar) performed live for the first time since 2003 in front of Ljubljana City Hall at the opening event of the 10-year celebration of nearby Pritličje Bar in Ljubljana Old Town.

== Discography ==
=== Studio albums ===
- Niowt (1997)
- Loverboy (2001)

== Previous members ==
- Bojan Brajkovič
- Luka Jamnik
- Jernej Jurc
- Tibor Mihelič
- Robert Oven
- Luka Šalehar
- Matej Puklavec
- Boštjan Vajs
