= Eskişehirspor Magazine =

Eskişehirspor Magazine (Turkish: Eskişehirspor Dergisi) is Turkish football club Eskişehirspor's official monthly magazine. The magazine was first released in August 2008.
