= Eat This! =

Studio album by SCH
- Released: 2004
- Recorded: 2003–2004
- Genre: Alternative rock; experimental; electro-industrial; acid techno; IDM; noise rock; krautrock; gothic rock; folk
- Label: Buybook
- Producer: Senad Hadžimusić Teno

SCH chronology
VRIL (2002)	Eat This! (2004)	Deluge and After (2006)

Eat This! is the seventh official album by SCH, released in Sarajevo in 2004. Eat This! is made up of two CDs, one white and one black, exploring sound textures for over two hours. The recording line-up was Teno (guitar/synth/vocals/computer) and Rida Attarashany (synth, vocals). Amir Misirlić, in BH Dani, analyzes the album, saying: "I'm not sure if Eat This! should be approached strictly as a music album. With help of a few collaborators, Teno created and recorded over two hours of music, noise, cacophony and sound experiments that overgrow by far the scene it comes from."

Professional ratings
Review scores
Source	Rating
BH Dani	link
Start	link
INFO Magazin	link

== Track listing ==
CD I

1. "Birthing babies on the sly"
2. "Defender"
3. "Blur"
4. "Scallop"
5. "Invisible worm"
6. "The last of summer"
7. "Oh, leave me alone"
8. "Dying for you"
9. "Flying"

CD II

1. "Waterfront"
2. "Prozac"
3. "Days in days out"
4. "Hope"
5. "Waxing the dolphin 1"
6. "Waxing the dolphin 2"
7. "Waxing the dolphin 3"
8. "Waxing the dolphin 4"
9. "Faith"
10. "Hats off mister"
11. "Greek Paranoid"
