= Eskişehirspor =

Turkish football club

- Full name: Eskişehirspor Kulübü
- Nicknames: ES-ES; Kırmızı Şimşekler (Red Lightnings); Anadolu Yıldızı (Star of Anatolia)
- Founded: 19 June 1965; 61 years ago
- Ground: New Eskişehir Stadium
- Capacity: 32,500
- Chairman: Ulaş Entok
- Manager: Ümit Metin Yıldız
- League: TFF Third League
- 2024–25: Turkish Regional Amateur League, Group VI, 1st (promoted)
- Website: www.eskisehirspor.org.tr
Home colours	Away colours	Third colours

Eskişehirspor Kulübü is a Turkish football club located in Eskişehir. Founded in 1965, Eskişehirspor competed in the top division of Turkish football for 16 years until they were relegated. After being out of the Süper Lig for 12 years the club won the TFF First League playoffs and were promoted in May 2008. Since being relegated from the Süper Lig in 2016 they have competed in lower leagues.

== History ==
=== Early years ===
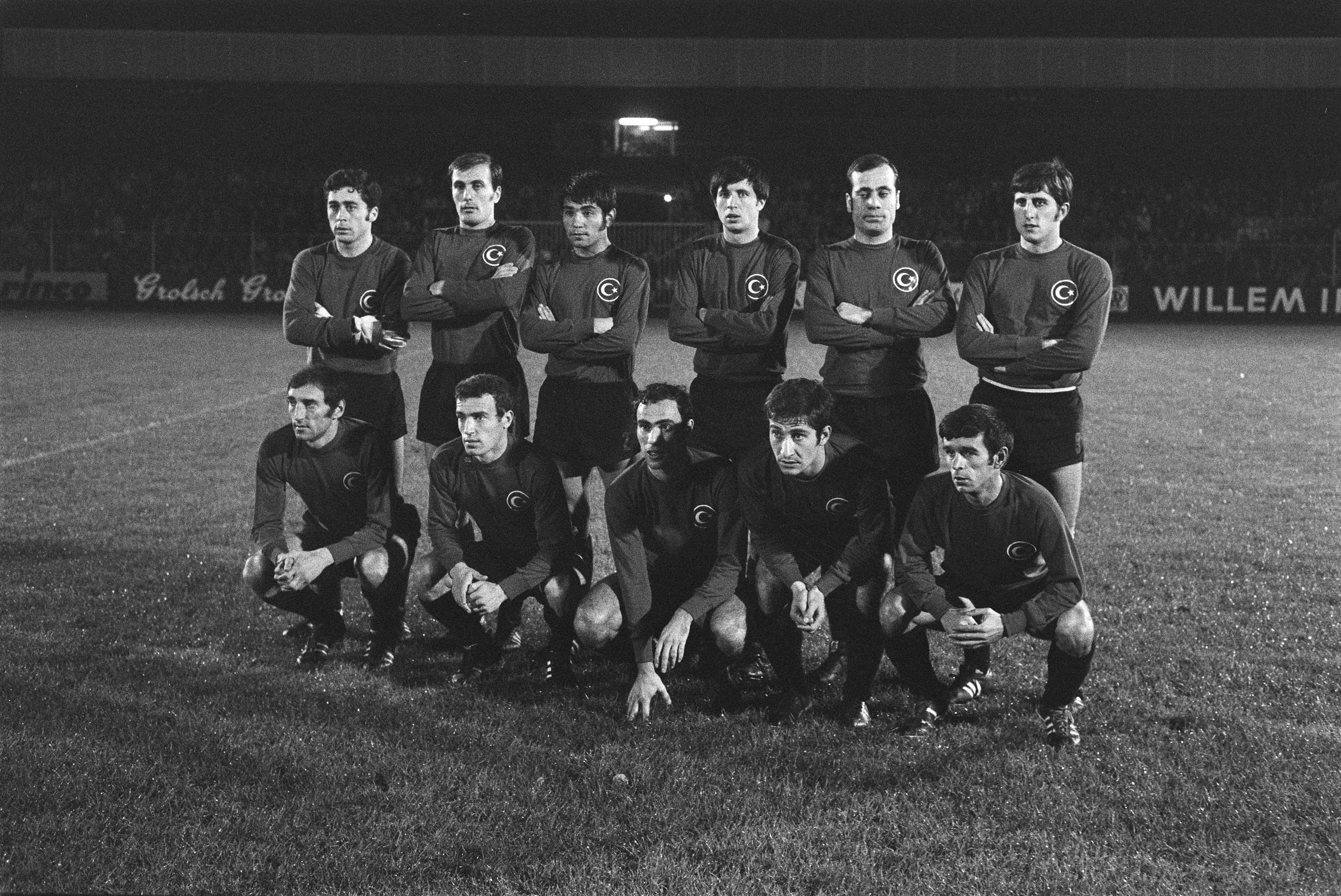
Squad of Eskişehirspor at the Inter-Cities Fairs Cup in 1970

Eskişehirspor was founded by merging the regional teams of İdman Yurdu, Akademi Gençlik and Yıldıztepe and was admitted to the Second League in the 1965–1966 season. The team was promoted to the First League in its first professional season. Eskişehirspor became one of the better historically rich Anatolian clubs despite having never won the Süper Lig between 1968 and 1975. They were runners-up in 1968–1969, 1969–1970, and 1971–1972 seasons. Eskişehirspor won the Turkish Cup in the 1969–1970 season by beating Bursaspor by 4–3 (1–2, 3–1) aggregate and a year after that in 1970–1971 season they lifted the Cumhurbaskanligi Kupasi (President Cup) by beating Galatasaray once again by the same scoreline 3–2 with all goals coming from the Eskişehirspor legend himself Fethi Heper. But in 2024/25 season they managed to be first in Turkish Regional Amateur League and Return to 3rd League.

=== Unforgettable match ===
One of Eskişehirspor's greatest matches took place in the 1970–71 UEFA Cup against Sevilla FC. Eskişehirspor lost the away leg 1–0, but Fethi Heper won it for them 3–2, scoring a hat-trick in front of a home crowd with only 10 minutes left to play.

=== 1980s and 1990s ===
After the 80's, Eskişehirspor started to slowly lose their success. The club relegated to the Second League in the 1981–82 season after an eventful match against Beşiktaş on gameweek 34, the last gameweek. The match was halted at 78th minute due to an intemperance caused by Eskişehirspor's supporters, after Beşiktaş's midfielder Ziya scored the 2-1 goal in the 76th minute. Eskişehirspor was announced to have unanimously lost the match 3-0 by TFF and relegated, being 1 point behind Gaziantepspor while Beşiktaş won the First League trophy 14 years after their last league trophy in 1967. Eskişehirspor returned to the First League in the 1983–84 season. They reached the Federation Cup final in the 1986–87 season but lost against Gençlerbirliği 6–2 on aggregate. They won the Chancellor Cup against Beşiktaş after the penalty shootout resulted in a 4–2 victory, the match previously finishing in a 2–2 draw.

They relegated again to the Second League after a 1–0 loss against Galatasaray, a goal scored by Tanju in Round 38, the last round in the 1988–89 season. Eskişehirspor collected 41 points and remained behind Altay by average. They relegated to the Third League after finishing third from last in Group A of the Second League in the 1991–92 season. However, they returned to the Second League the following season after finishing 1st in Group 5 of the Third League.

Eskişehirspor finished 1st in the 3rd Group in the Second League and qualified for the Promotion Group in the 1994–95 season. They finished 3rd and qualified to Extra Playoff where they successfully defeated Erzurumspor 2–1, Adanaspor 3–2 after extra time and Aydınspor 2–1, returning to the First League. Eskişehirspor's new adventure in the First League would however last only one season as they were relegated after a 7-1 loss against Trabzonspor despite a good start against İstanbulspor where the match finished in a 3–1 victory for Eskişehirspor. Eskişehirspor qualified to the Promotion Playoff but didn't return to the First League in the 1997–98 season. They escaped relegation to the Third League the following season, Petrol Ofisi SK being the one to relegated in the 1998–99 season. Eskişehirspor finally qualified to the Second League Category B (later renamed Second League), which is the third level of Turkish football, after the 2000–2001 season.

=== Back to the Süper Lig ===
Eskişehirspor finished 1st in 3rd Group of İddaa League B and played in Promotion Group in 2005–2006 season. They finished 3rd behind of Kasımpaşa and Gençlerbirliği Asaşspor and qualified for Extra Playoff matches. Eskişehirspor's first play off match was against Kardemir Karabükspor. After regular and extra time the match ended in a 0–0 draw. Eskişehirspor advanced to quarter final game after beating them 3–1 in the penalty shoot out. They also defeated Sarıyer after 6–5 in the penalty shoot out. Regular and extra time the match ended in a 0–0 draw before penalty shoot out. They defeated 3–0 Kartalspor in semifinal and Pendikspor in final and promoted to First League. Eskişehirspor finished 13th in 2006–2007 season. After a successful season in the Bank Asya First League, Eskişehirspor finished in 4th place and qualified for the playoffs in 2007–2008 season. The playoffs determine who is going to take the third and final promotion spot for the Süper Lig.

Eskişehirspor's first play off match was against Diyarbakırspor. The match ended 0–0 after regular and extra time, Eskişehirspor won the penalty shoot out, 6–5.

The final match against Boluspor was held at the Beşiktaş' Inonu Stadium in Istanbul. At the end of 90 minutes Eskişehirspor were promoted to the Süper Lig winning 2–0, with goals from Doğa Kaya and Coşkun Birdal.

On 3 June 2008, Halil Ünal was elected as the new chairman of Eskişehirspor. Rıza Çalımbay was appointed as manager for the 2008–2009 season. Eskişehirspor beat Galatasaray twice (4–2 at home and 1–0 at away), and draw 2–2 with Fenerbahçe at home in this season and secured Süper Lig status for 2009–2010 season, despite losing 5–2 at home to Trabzonspor on 24 May 2009. The 2009–2010 season was a much more progressive period for ESES. Almost all title chasing clubs were beaten in the Eskisehir Stadium by Kırmızı Şimşekler. ESES had a very poor beginning to the 2010–2011 season, losing 6 matches back to back. Rıza Çalımbay was sacked by the board and Bulent Uygun was announced as the new Coach. Within a short time he and his technical staff solved the main problems of the team, and, after 10 matches, almost qualified for the UEFA Cup, but were ranked 7th in the table at end of the season. During the summer break, Bulent Uygun was fired and Michael Skibbe announced as new coach.

=== Relegation to amateur level and transfer ban ===
Eskişehirspor was relegated from the Süper Lig in 2016 and spent 5 seasons in the TFF First League, the second division of Turkish football, before being relegated in 2021. During this period, the club was placed under a transfer embargo starting in 2019, due to months of unpaid wages and a debt of 234 million Turkish Lira.

In 2022, the club suffered back-to-back relegations as it fell to the TFF Third League.

In January 2023, Erkan Koca was elected as the sole candidate at the extraordinary general assembly meeting and became the new president of the club. After the new management took office, Eskişehirspor's transfer ban was lifted in February 2023 after 7 transfer periods following the letter of no debt received from its creditors. At the end of the 2022–23 season, the club was relegated to the Turkish Regional Amateur League.

== Crest and colours ==
The unmistakable emblem was actually designed by Eskişehirspor's first club chairman Aziz Bolel and perfected by graphic designer Selahattin Vapur, the three stars represent the merger of Akademi Gençlik, İdmanyurdu and Yıldıztepe.

The club colours were inspired by French club Stade Rennais' 1964–1965 Coupe De France win, the board saw Rennes lifting the cup celebrating on the front page of a football magazine and immediately fell in love with the club colours and adopted them as their own believing that it would bring them good luck.

== Stadium ==
=== Eskişehir Atatürk Stadium ===
Eskişehir Atatürk Stadium (Turkish: Eskişehir Atatürk Stadı) is a multi-purpose stadium in Eskişehir, Turkey. It was used mostly as Eskişehirspor's home ground. The stadium was built in 1953 and held 13,520 people. It was named after the Turkish statesman Mustafa Kemal Atatürk.

=== New Eskişehir Stadium ===
New Eskişehir Stadium is a multi-use stadium in the Sazova neighborhood of (Southwest of Eskişehir metropolitan area) Eskişehir, Turkey. The all-seated stadium has a capacity of nearly 32,500 people. It was also one of the 9 candidate host stadiums of the Turkish bid for EURO 2016. Despite losing the election, the Chairman of TFF said "we have to work on these stadiums like a winner of the election; I'm going to talk about it with the Prime Minister".

The inner walls of the stadium are constructed partially with serigraphic glass to provide maximum transparency from the inside and to emphasise its open character at night. A tram line connects the New Eskişehir Stadium with the city centre, the airport and the university. A new express ring road around the city also passes just south of the stadium.

On 7 January 2010, the Eskişehirspor president, Halil Ünal, Eskişehir mayor, Prof. Dr. Yılmaz Büyükerşen and Eskişehir governor, Mehmet Kılıçlar, signed the agreement to construct the new stadium in Muttalip.

The stadium also replaced the Eskişehir Atatürk Stadium, former home ground of Eskişehirspor.

It opened to the public on 20 November 2016.

== Supporters ==
The supporters show up during the season with their Band Team (known as BandoESES). Besides BandoESES, there is another supporter group (known as KoreoESES), who create original shows, with choreography for every match, both at the stadium and on the road. Eskişehirspor supporters are different when it comes to maintaining their loyalty through the 2nd and 3rd divisions. They reject the idea that their stadium be moved to the outskirts of the city. They have gained recognition and respect as one of the fiercest fanbases in Turkey and are known as a "phenomenon" of Turkish football.

=== Attendance record ===
The game in Group VI between Eskişehirspor and Manavgat Belediyespor of December 15, 2024 had the highest attendances numbers in the history of the Turkish Regional Amateur League with a total of 30,328 spectators.

=== BandoESES ===
Founded in 2006 at the 'Samba Bar' in Eskişehir, BandoESES began as a small group of friends and developed into a prominent supporter group for Eskişehirspor. The group consists of 23 active musicians playing brass and percussion instruments, including trumpets and traditional Turkish davul drums. They perform during matches to dictate the tempo of stadium chants and introduce various musical styles to the stands.

=== Controversy ===
On 14 May 2016, after losing 1–2 to İstanbul BB, by a late winning goal in the 93rd minute, Eskişehirspor, after all the effort to stay, were relegated from the Süper Lig. Fans of the club, the Eskişehirspor Ultras, upset with this, set their own stadium on fire. The stadium was never used again.

== Honours ==
- Süper Lig
  - Runners-up (3): 1968–69, 1969–70, 1971–72
- Turkish Cup
  - Winners (1): 1970–71
  - Runners-up (3): 1969–70, 1986–87, 2013–14
- Turkish Super Cup
  - Winners (1): 1970–71
- Prime Minister's Cup:
  - Winners (3): 1966, 1972, 1987
- Balkans Cup:
  - Runners-up (1): 1975

== League participations ==
- Süper Lig: 1966–82, 1984–89, 1995–96, 2008–2016
- TFF First League: 1965–66, 1982–84, 1989–92, 1993–95, 1996–01, 2006–08, 2016–2021
- TFF Second League: 1992–93, 2001–06, 2021–2022
- TFF Third League: 2022–2023
- Regional Amateur League: 2023–

=== Competition history ===
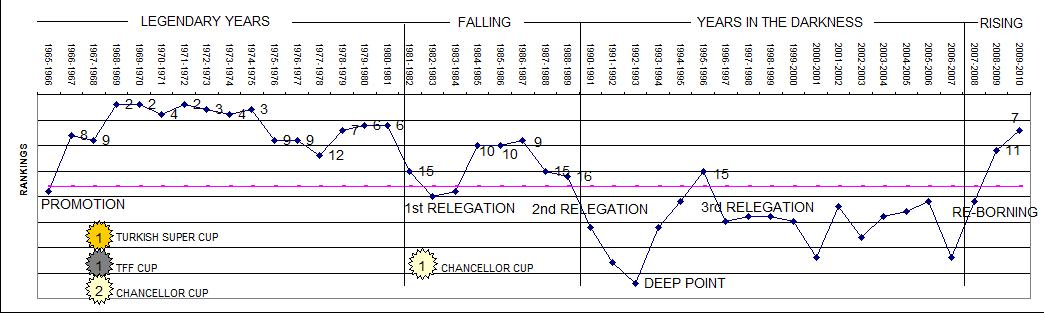

== European record ==
As of 9 August 2012

Competition	Pld	W	D	L	GF	GA	GD
UEFA Cup Winners' Cup	4	1	1	2	4	2	+2
UEFA Cup / UEFA Europa League	10	1	3	6	6	19	–13
UEFA Total	14	2	4	8	10	21	–11
Inter-Cities Fairs Cup	4	2	0	2	7	10	–3
Balkans Cup	14	5	2	7	23	24	–1
non-UEFA Total	18	7	2	9	30	34	–4
Overall Total	32	9	6	17	40	55	–15

Season	Competition	Round	Club	Home	Away	Aggregate
1970	Balkans Cup	GS	(Bulgaria) Beroe Stara Zagora	3–1	0–1	2nd
1970	Balkans Cup	GS	(Greece) Egaleo	3–0	0–3	2nd
1970–71	Inter-Cities Fairs Cup	1R	(Spain) Sevilla	3–1	0–1	3–2
1970–71	Inter-Cities Fairs Cup	2R	(Netherlands) Twente	3–2	1–6	4–8
1971–72	European Cup Winners' Cup	1R	(Finland) Mikkeli	4–0	0–0	4–0
1971–72	European Cup Winners' Cup	2R	(Soviet Union) Dynamo Moscow	0–1	0–1	0–2
1972–73	UEFA Cup	1R	(Italy) Fiorentina	1–2	0–3	1–5
1973–74	UEFA Cup	1R	(West Germany) 1. FC Köln	0–0	0–2	0–2
1975	Balkans Cup	GS	(Bulgaria) Lokomotiv Sofia	3–0	0–3	1st
1975	Balkans Cup	GS	(Romania) Farul Constanța	2–1	2–2	1st
1975	Balkans Cup	F	(Socialist Federal Republic of Yugoslavia) Radnički Niš	1–2	0–1	1–3
1975–76	UEFA Cup	1R	(Bulgaria) PFC Levski Sofia	1–4	0–3	1–7
1987–88	Balkans Cup	GS	(Romania) Corvinul Hunedoara	2–2	2–5	2nd
1987–88	Balkans Cup	GS	(Albania) Dinamo Tirana	4–0	1–3	2nd
2012–13	UEFA Europa League	2Q	(Scotland) St Johnstone	2–0	1–1	3–1
2012–13	UEFA Europa League	3Q	(France) Marseille	1–1	0–3	1–4

=== UEFA club ranking ===
As of 2017

Season	Rank	Points	Ref.
1971	144 ▲	1.000	
1972	105 ▲	1.750	
1973	101 ▲	1.750	
1974	80 ▲	2.250	
1975	83 ▼	2.250	
1976	132 ▼	1.250	
1977	200 ▼	0.500	
1978	200	0.500	
2013	178 ▲	7.900	
2014	199 ▼	7.840	
2015	208 ▼	7.520	
2016	194 ▲	7.920	
2017	172 ▲	8.840	

== Players ==
=== Current squad ===
As of 8 September 2022

Note: Flags indicate national team as defined under FIFA eligibility rules; some limited exceptions apply. Players may hold more than one non-FIFA nationality.

No.	Pos.	Nation	Player
1	GK	TUR	Efehan Kaptan
3	DF	TUR	Muhammet Akbulut
4	MF	TUR	Hasan Ulaş Uyğur
5	DF	TUR	Arda Okumuş
6	MF	TUR	Kaan Gaman
7	FW	TUR	Göktuğ Ünüvar
8	MF	TUR	Onur Bayramoğlu
9	FW	TUR	Onur Arı
10	MF	TUR	Tolga Yakut
11	MF	TUR	Onurhan Uyanık
17	DF	TUR	Selman Çiftkanatlı
20	MF	TUR	Bedirhan Akçay

No.	Pos.	Nation	Player
21	MF	TUR	Utku Kızılkaya
22	FW	TUR	Metehan Toprak
25	DF	BEL	Eray Ertorun
26	MF	AUT	Berkay Tanır
30	MF	TUR	Eren Altıntaş
34	MF	TUR	Yunus Emre Alagöz
44	DF	TUR	Sezgin Çolpan
50	DF	TUR	Bartu Göçmen
77	DF	TUR	Cihangir Çağlıyan
90	FW	TUR	Hasan Alp Altınoluk
97	MF	TUR	Ömer Faruk Söyler
—	MF	TUR	Ozan İsmail Koç

=== Other players under contract ===
Note: Flags indicate national team as defined under FIFA eligibility rules; some limited exceptions apply. Players may hold more than one non-FIFA nationality.

No.	Pos.	Nation	Player
—	FW	TUR	Doğukan Ünal

== Managers ==
- (Turkey) Abdullah Matay (1965–66)
- (Turkey) Cihat Arman (1966–67)
- (Socialist Federal Republic of Yugoslavia) Abdulah Gegić (1 July 1967 – 30 June 1971)
- (Turkey) Abdullah Matay (1971–72)
- (Socialist Federal Republic of Yugoslavia) Tomislav Kaloperović (1973)
- (Turkey) Abdullah Matay (1973–74)
- (Romania) Octavian Popescu (1974–75)
- (Turkey) Abdullah Matay (1976)
- (Socialist Federal Republic of Yugoslavia) Abdulah Gegić (1977–78)
- (Turkey) Abdullah Matay (1981–82)
- (Socialist Federal Republic of Yugoslavia) Milorad Mitrović (1981–83)
- (Socialist Federal Republic of Yugoslavia) Abdulah Gegić (1983)
- (Romania) Valeriu Neagu (1984–85)
- (Socialist Federal Republic of Yugoslavia) Milorad Mitrović (1985–86)
- (Turkey) Ender Konca (1986)
- (Socialist Federal Republic of Yugoslavia) Đorđe Gerum (1986–87)
- (Turkey) Abdullah Matay (1986–87)
- (Socialist Federal Republic of Yugoslavia) Milorad Mitrović (1988–89)
- (Turkey) Ender Konca (1990)
- (Romania) Ilie Datcu (1991)
- (Turkey) Abdullah Matay (1993–94)
- (Turkey) Yılmaz Vural (23 May 1995 – 14 Dec 1995)
- (Turkey) Güvenç Kurtar (1996)
- (Turkey) Akif Başaran (20 Nov 1998 – 30 June 1999)
- (Socialist Federal Republic of Yugoslavia) Buran Beadini (1999), (1999–00), (2001)
- (Turkey) Yavuz İncedal (2006–07)
- (Turkey) Metin Diyadin (4 April 2007 – 30 June 2008)
- (Bosnia and Herzegovina) Nenad Bijedić (21 March 2008 – 1 June 2008)
- (Turkey) Rıza Çalımbay (4 July 2008 – 30 June 2011)
- (Turkey) Bülent Uygun (6 Oct 2010 – 7 July 2011)
- (Germany) Michael Skibbe (18 July 2011 – 21 Dec 2011)
- (Turkey) Ersun Yanal (26 Dec 2011 – 25 June 2013)
- (Turkey) Ertuğrul Sağlam (28 June 2013 – 5 Jan 2015)
- (Germany) Michael Skibbe (8 Jan 2015 – 10 Oct 2015)
- (Turkey) Ismail Kartal (11 Oct 2015 – 12 Nov 2015)
- (Turkey) Samet Aybaba (17 Nov 2015 – 19 May 2016)
- (Turkey) Alpay Özalan (23 Jun 2016 – 14 Mar 2017)
- (Turkey) Mustafa Denizli (23 Feb 2017 – 30 Jun 2017)
- (Turkey) Sergen Yalçın (31 Jul 2017 – 25 Sep 2017)
- (Turkey) Yücel İldiz (25 Sep 2017 – 5 Apr 2018)
- (Turkey) Yılmaz Vural (6 Apr 2018 – 30 Jun 2018)
- (Turkey) Fuat Çapa (7 Aug 2018 – 12 Sep 2019)
- (Turkey) Coşkun Demirbakan (18 Sep 2019 – 25 Dec 2019)
- (Turkey) Mustafa Özer (26 Dec 2019 – 28 Sep 2020)
- (Turkey) İlhan Var (9 Oct 2020 – 5 Jan 2021)
- (Turkey) Yasin Söğüt (21 Jan 2021 – 3 Feb 2021)
- (Turkey) Cengiz Seçsev (3 Feb 2021– 14 Apr 2021)
- (Turkey) Cem Karaca (29 Jul 2021 – 19 Oct 2021)
- (Turkey) Suat Kaya (20 Oct 2021 – 30 Jul 2022)
- (Turkey) Emre Özbayer (4 Jul 2022 – )

== See also ==
- Eskişehirspor (women)
- Eskişehirspor Magazine
