= Dance (SCH album) =

Studio album by SCH
- Released: 2007
- Recorded: 2007
- Genre: Alternative dance; electro-industrial; techno; IDM
- Label: Polikita Records
- Producer: Senad Hadžimusić Teno

SCH chronology
SCH Live (2007)	Dance (2007)	SCH Dirty Lo-Fi Archive 1984-2008 (2008)

Professional ratings
Review scores
Source	Rating
TerapijaNet	10/10 stars

Dance is the eleventh and the most recent official album by SCH from 2007. The recording line-up was Teno (guitar/synth/vocals/computer) and Azra Pallas (vocals). This electro-dance album, according to Vladimir Horvat of TerapijaNet, avoids "all hybrid commercial traps... [consisting of] 70 minutes of the pure joy of listening... Totally simple yet very sophisticated."

== Track listing ==
1. "City"
2. "Fly" (an official preview)
3. "Great Scrutinizer"
4. "Reality Show"
5. "Shivering Lap"
6. "Europa Galante" (an official preview)
7. "Let's Pray" on YouTube (from the official SCH YouTube Channel)
8. "Ein BosniSCHes Requiem"
9. "Our Enemy Goes to Hell"
10. "Cradlesong"
