= White Music (SCH album) =

WHITE MUSIC Two Ways To German Art & Work Discipline

Studio album by SCH
- Released: 1992
- Recorded: 1990
- Genre: Alternative rock; industrial rock; noise rock
- Label: Listen Loudest
- Producer: Senad Hadžimusić Teno

SCH chronology
During Wartime (1989)	WHITE MUSIC; Two Ways To German Art & Work Discipline (1992)	The Gentle Art of Firing (1995)

WHITE MUSIC: Two Ways To German Art & Work Discipline is the third official studio album by SCH. Although released in 1992 on the Zagreb independent label Listen Loudest, the album was produced and recorded during 1990. It was the first harsh-noise album in ex-Yugoslavia. The recording line-up was Teno (guitar/bass/synth/vocals/noises) and Samir Bjelanović (drums).

Sonically, the album depicts what may be best described as the emotive states of those certain living material forms that had survived the total (nuclear) war.

== Track listing ==
1. "End"
2. "Straight to Discipline"
3. "Our Song 1"
4. "Our Song 2"
5. "O Deutsche"
6. "Smjena"
