= Spirit of Bosnia =

- Editor: Keith Doubt
- Categories: Literary magazine
- Frequency: Quarterly
- Publisher: Department of Sociology, Wittenberg University
- First issue: 2006
- Country: United States
- Language: English, Bosnian
- Website: www.spiritofbosnia.org
- ISSN: 1931-4957
- OCLC: 266456473

Spirit of Bosnia (Bosnian: Duh Bosne) is a quarterly literary magazine that covers scholarly research and writing on the history, politics, and literature of Bosnia and Herzegovina. It publishes works of fiction and non-fiction reflective of its mission and was established in 2006. Its editor-in-chief is Keith Doubt (Wittenberg University). From 2006-2011, Omer Hadžiselimović (Loyola University) was co-editor.

== Description ==
Spirit of Bosnia publishes articles, poems, book reviews, and other features and encourages the work of scholars, researchers, and readers around the world interested in Bosnia, frequently representing the sole open access source in English available for information about the culture and history of this region. It has debuted English translations of many Bosnian poets and writers, making their work accessible to a broad audience, and provides Bosnian translation of English-language contributions, providing reciprocal access to these works.

Writers from this region whose translations were introduced to an English-speaking audience in this journal include Ivo Banac, Sonja Biserko, Svetlana Broz, Muhamed Filipović, Marko Attila Hoare, Milorad Pejić, Abdulah Sidran, Sasha Skenderija, and many others.
