= Lazar Bojić =

- Born: 1791
- Died: 17 July 1859 (aged 67–68)

Lazar Bojić (Serbian: Лазар Бојић) (1791–1859) was a Serbian writer and a priest. Lazar was a Serbian Orthodox priest in Osijek from 1838 to 1852, and engaged in literature (published a book in 1815). His 1815 work Pamjatnik mužem u slaveno-serbskom knižestvu slavnym [Pantheon of renowned figures of the Slavic-Serb literature], comprising four volumes of biographies of Serbian writers and poets, is considered a significant work in Serbian literary studies. He is also remembered as the first Serbian bibliographer.

Lazar Bojić was a student of the Seminary in Sremski Karlovci, where he attended his final years of schooling in 1812 and 1813, listening to lectures on Serbian literature by Lukijan Mušicki, which he eventually incorporated into his broad survey of writers and poets of the Age of Enlightenment (See: List of Serbs). He was inspired by Dositej Obradović's Etika; Pavle Solarić's Pomesinak knjizeski (Literary Compendium); and correspondences between Lukijan Mušicki and Jernej Kopitar and some of Mušicki's manuscripts and notes. He brought to light most of the 18th century Serbian poets, writers, painters of the Age of Enlightenment, namely contemporaries of Dositej Obradović and also his disciples. He also criticized Vuk Karadžić because Bojić believed that Serbo-Slavonic had a place side-by-side with the new language reform.

== Works ==
- Bojić, Lazar (January 28, 1815). "Pamjatnik mužem u slaveno-serbskom knižestvu slavnym".

== See also ==
- Dositej Obradović
- Jevtimije Ivanović
- Atanasije Dimitrijević Sekereš
- Stefan Vujanovski
- Uroš Nestorović
- Dimitrie Eustatievici
- Djordje Natošević
- Nikola Vukicevic
