= Danko Šipka =

Serbian-American linguist (born 1962)

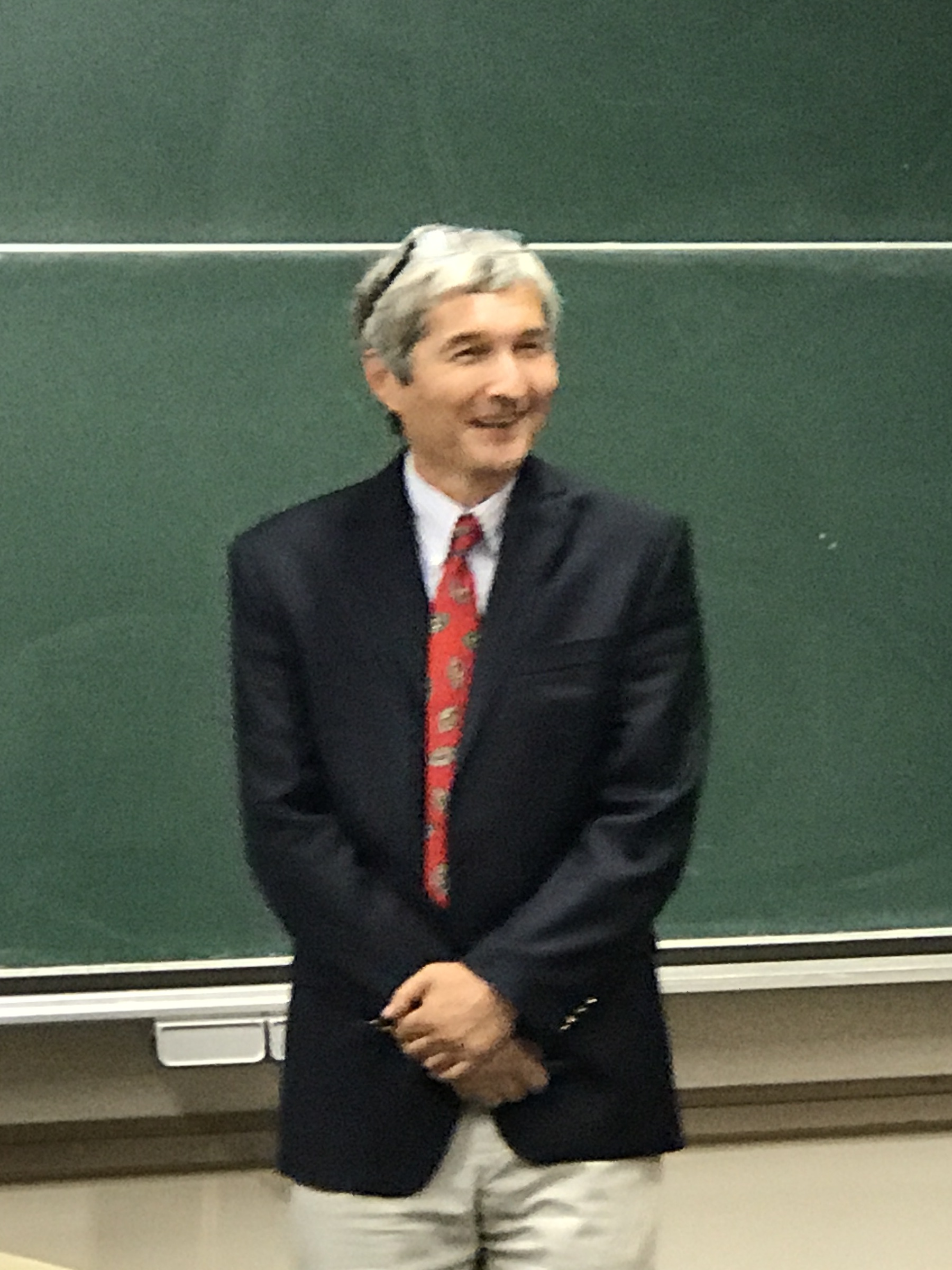
- Šipka in class, 2017
- Born: 1962 (age 63–64); Banja Luka, PR Bosnia and Herzegovina, Yugoslavia
- Education: Polish Academy of Sciences; Adam Mickiewicz University; University of Belgrade
- Occupations: Professor of Slavic Languages and Applied Linguistics
- Employer: Arizona State University
- Known for: Slavic languages Lexicography; Lexicology

Danko Šipka (Serbian Cyrillic: Данко Шипка, Serbian pronunciation: [dâːŋko ʃîpka]; born 1962) is a Serbian American linguist and professor of Slavic languages and applied linguistics at Arizona State University.

== Biography ==
He was born in Banja Luka in 1962. He graduated Slavistics at the Faculty of Philosophy in Sarajevo in 1985 and later obtained PhD in linguistics at the Faculty of Philology in Belgrade. He was educated at Polish Academy of Sciences, Adam Mickiewicz University, and University of Belgrade in the fields of linguistics and psychology. He was an Alexander von Humboldt Foundation, Fulbright program, and American Council of Learned Societies fellow. He received fellowships from the Australian National University, and Hokkaido University, Japan. In 2010, he received titular professorship from the president of the Republic of Poland Bronisław Komorowski. He won NCOLCTL Walton Award in 2019. In the spring of 2021 he was an Istvan Deak Visiting Professor at Columbia University

His work The Cambridge Handbook of Slavic Linguistics (along with editor Wayles Browne) won the 2025 AATSEEL award for Best Contribution in Second Language Acquisition.

== Research ==
Šipka is the author of various monographs and dictionaries, such as Serbian-English general dictionaries for "Prometej", the monograph titled Lexical Conflict: Theory and practice with Cambridge University Press, Lexical Layers of Identity: Words, Meaning, and Culture in the Slavic Languages, The Geography of Words with Cambridge University Press, and Water, Whiskey, and Vodka: A Story of Slavic Languages with Georgetown University Press; His main research interests lie in the fields of lexicography, lexicology, linguistic anthropology, computational linguistics, and Slavic linguistics. In 2017, Sipka has signed the Declaration on the Common Language of the Croats, Serbs, Bosniaks and Montenegrins. Sipka was the editor-in-chief of the Journal of the National Council of Less Commonly Taught Languages from 2008 to 2020.
