= Novi Rock =

Rock festival in Ljubljana, Slovenia

Novi Rock was a widely acclaimed rock festival in Ljubljana, Slovenia, which brought the latest currents in popular music to Slovene and Yugoslav audiences between 1981 and 2000. Bands that have played in the past include: Smashing Pumpkins, The Verve, Moby, Nick Cave, Amebix, Swans, Crime & the City Solution, Disciplina kičme, Električni orgazam, Film, Lačni Franz, Haustor, Dorian Gray, Pankrti, Plavi orkestar, SCH, Rocket from the Crypt, Cop Shoot Cop, Destruction, Laibach, Darkwood Dub, The Stroj, Oysterband, Niowt and others.

Igor Bašin wrote the book about the festival in 2006. The book takes an analytical look at the festival in the wider social context of the final decade of Yugoslavia and the first decade of independent Slovenia.
