= Bojić, Šabac =

Bojić Бојић (Serbian)
- Village (Selo)
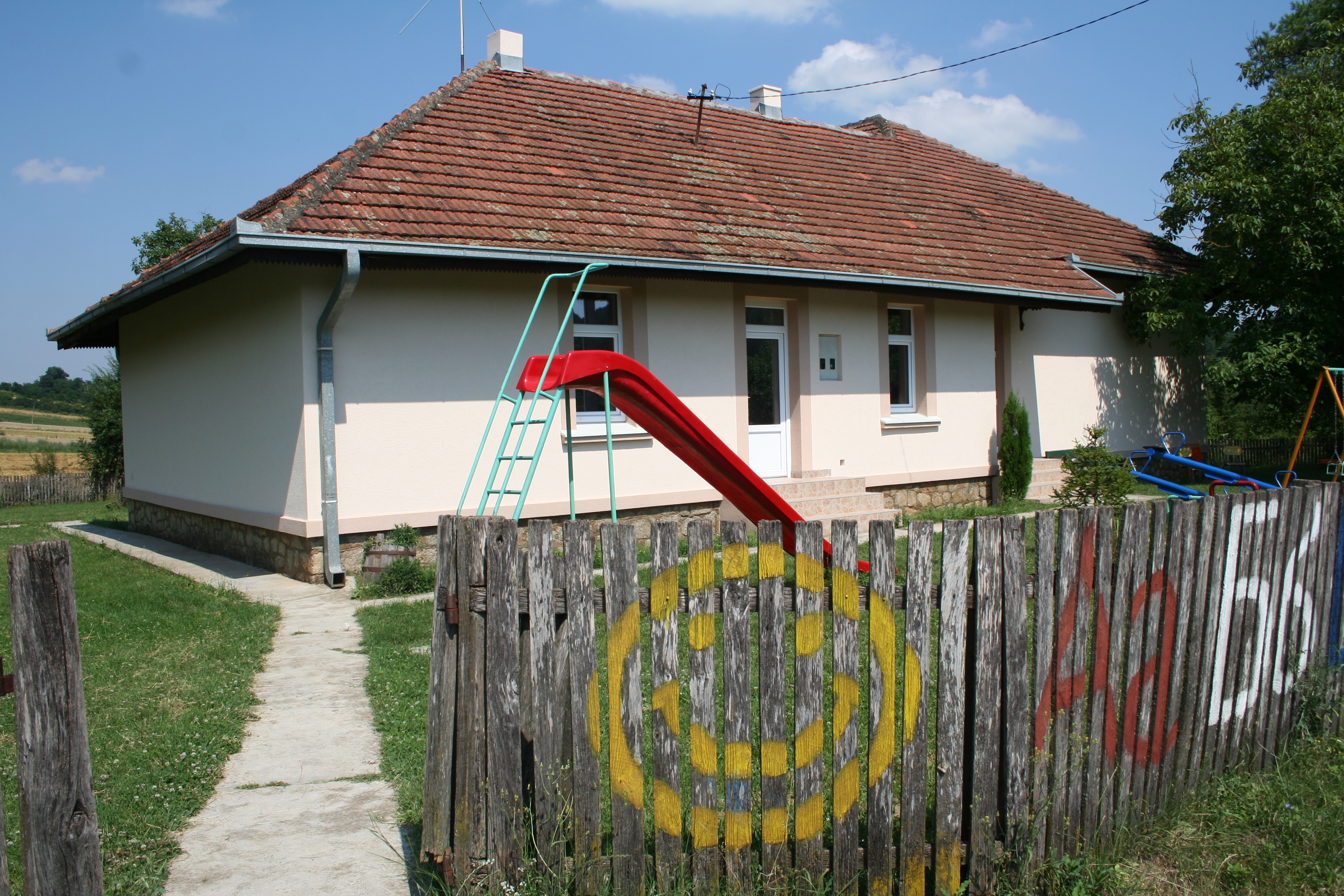
- Interactive map of Bojić
- Location within Serbia
- Coordinates: 44°37′57″N 19°38′50″E
- Country: Serbia
- District: Mačva District
- Municipality: Šabac

Population (2002)
  - Total: 382
- Time zone: UTC+1 (CET)
  - Summer (DST): UTC+2 (CEST)

Bojić is a village in the municipality of Šabac, Serbia. According to the 2002 census, the village has a population of 382 people.
