= .sch (file extension) =

File extension of circuit schematic files

The .sch file extension is used to indicate a circuit schematic file by various electronic design automation programs, all using different file formats. These types of files are used by:

- OrCAD (old versions)
- EAGLE (all versions)
- Protel (old versions)
- Altium (some versions)
- KiCad (old versions)
- PADS (all versions)
- gschem of gEDA suite

== See also ==
- Microsoft Schedule (also using this file extension)
