= Dubravko Bojić =

Serbian politician (born 1953)

- Дубравко Бојић

Member of the National Assembly of the Republic of Serbia
- In office 3 June 2016 – 3 August 2020

Personal details
- Born: 1953 (age 72–73)
- Party: SRS

Dubravko Bojić (Serbian Cyrillic: Дубравко Бојић; born 1953) is a Serbian politician. He served in the Serbian parliament from 2016 to 2020 as a member of the far-right Serbian Radical Party (SRS).

== Private career ==
Bojić is a retired professor of the Russian language living in Belgrade.

== Politician ==
Bojić received the seventeenth position on the Radical Party's electoral list in the 2016 Serbian parliamentary election and was elected when the party won twenty-two mandates. The Serbian Progressive Party (SNS) and its allies won a majority victory, and the Radicals served afterward in opposition. During his assembly term, Bojić was a member of the education committee, (Note: Formally known as the Committee on Education, Science, Technological Development, and the Information Society.) a deputy member of the foreign affairs committee and the health and family committee, a member of a commission to "investigate the consequences of the NATO 1999 bombing on the health of the citizens of Serbia, as well as the environment, with a special focus on the impact of the depleted uranium projectiles," and a member of the parliamentary friendship groups with Belarus, Kazakhstan, Russia, Spain, and Venezuela.

In March 2017, Bojić participated in a Radical Party parliamentary delegation to Crimea to mark the three-year anniversary of the area's de facto joining of the Russian Federation. The government of Ukraine, which considers Crimea to be its sovereign territory, issued a five-year travel ban to Bojić and other members of the delegation. Two months later, Bojić took part in a Radical Party delegation to the breakaway Donetsk People's Republic. He returned to Crimea in November 2017, visiting Yalta with fellow parliamentarian Aleksandar Šešelj and co-founding a group called "Friends of Crimea."

In March 2018, Bojić took part in a multi-party delegation of Serbian parliamentarians to monitor the 2018 Russian presidential election.

He was promoted to the ninth position on the Radical Party's list in the 2020 parliamentary election and to the seventh position on the party's list for the 2022 Serbian parliamentary election. In both instances, the party fell below the electoral threshold for assembly representation.
