= VRIL =

Studio album by SCH
- Released: 2002
- Recorded: 2002
- Genre: Alternative dance; electro-industrial; techno; IDM
- Label: Magaza
- Producer: Senad Hadžimusić Teno

SCH chronology
During Wartime... Again! (1999)	VRIL (2002)	Eat This! (2004)

Professional ratings
Review scores
Source	Rating
Ljiljan	5/5 stars
Radio Študent (Tolpa bumov)	
skenders	
Muzika OnLine - Vijesti - 30	(8/10)
Oslobođenje	5/5 stars
Proroci, INFO magazin	4/5 stars
StartBiH	

VRIL is the sixth official album by SCH. Following a seven-year hiatus, Teno resumed activity in 2002, with a new electronic sound. According to the official SCH discography, "VRIL is a concept album that deals with the occult, space, aliens, secret societies, high politics, VRIL energy and other 'dangerous matters'."

Ognjen Tvrtković, in Ljiljan, describes how SCH's previous "guitar noise" has been replaced by electronic instrumentation and sampling: "Once again we face an exploration of monotony, a minimalist research into rhythmic and melodic forms, tracks infused with a maximally claustrophobic atmosphere, and surreal imagery adopted from science fiction tomes...[t]ake Nazi UFO, [for example] a veritable little electronic symphony during which Hadžimusić develops his minimalist aesthetic of endless repetitiveness of rhythmic and melodic lines to the outer limits, a method he resorts to on a number of tracks here."

== Track listing ==
1. "E.T. Tanz"
2. "Ultima Thule - Mantra"
3. "Kazumi"
4. "Grijeh"
5. "Predugo sve ovo traje"
6. "Gruvy Lube"
7. "Tamna sila"
8. "Znaš da te oni k meni šalju"
9. "Nazi UFO"
10. "Traumkugel"
11. "Tamna sila"
