= During Wartime =

DURING WARTIME

Studio album by SCH
- Released: 1989
- Recorded: 1988
- Genre: Alternative rock; industrial rock; noise rock
- Label: Independent Edition, Jugoton
- Producer: Senad Hadžimusić Teno

SCH chronology
SCH (1987)	DURING WARTIME (1989)	White Music (1992)

Professional ratings
Review scores
Source	Rating
SunsetStrip	(not rated)
Saša Leskovac, Valter, Sarajevo, 1988	(not rated)

During Wartime is the second official studio album by SCH. It was released on the Jugoton label in 1989. The recording line-up was Teno (vocals/guitar/bass), Petar Erak (bass), and Zlatan Hadžić (drums).

The album addresses a variety of topics, including the eternal relationship between totalitarianism and democracy, humanism and fanaticism, leaders and their subjects, the rapture of the so-called manipulated, and elitism. A number of the tracks create/depict an atmosphere of anticipated urban war to come. Both in its title and content, During Wartime proclaims the coming of tumultuous political tremors that were to culminate in the destructive wars.

During Wartime was composed in the spring of 1988, announcing the upcoming political changes which culminated in the Bosnian war. Samir Šestan, in Culture, notes that: "Unlike many others, SCH fully responded to demands of that time and they did it in a precise, clear and clean manner. Constructively about destruction; harmonically about disharmony. On During Wartime, SCH brought a fusion of politics and aesthetics to culmination and proved that that is the only thing that art can deal with."

== Track listing ==
1. "Vagabonds"
2. "The Day When I Was Born"
3. "Ne dozvoli da zaboravim"
4. "Zbogom"
5. "Master"
6. "Partija naša"
7. "F.LJ.P. #7"
