= Milorad Mladenović =

Serbian artist and architect

Milorad Mladenović (Serbian Cyrillic: Милорад Младеновић; born 21 April 1966 in Belgrade) is a Serbian artist and architect, known mostly for his visual art works. Mladenović grew up in Smederevo and attended the Academy of Fine Arts as well as the University of Belgrade Faculty of Architecture, graduating in 1992 and 1994, respectively. He started his career with an array of works exhibited at the Studentski kulturni centar. He is a winner of multiple visual arts and architecture awards. Mladenović also exhibited his works at the Bikini-Haus of Berlin and Vienna's Secession.

He is currently a member of the Faculty of Architecture, and is also the co-founder and an active member of the "Treći Beograd" (Third Belgrade) art collective.

== Notable works ==
- No title, condensation. With Zoran Drekalović. Oktobarski Salon Award 2000.
- Belgrade: deleting language. Print installation. Oktobarski Salon Award 2003.
- Sistem binario... Destroyed Belgrade poem monument
- Beograd – nemesta, (Belgrade – nonplaces)
- Strah od ništa (Fear of nothing)
