= Milorad Mitrović (footballer, born 1949) =

Serbian football manager (born 1949)

Personal information
- Date of birth: 31 January 1949 (age 77)

Senior career*
| Years | Team | Apps | (Gls) |
- Šumadija Aranđelovac

Managerial career
- 1973–1977: Šumadija Aranđelovac
- 1977-1980: Radnički Pirot
- 1980-1981: Napredak Kruševac
- 1981–1983: Eskişehirspor
- 1985–1986: Eskişehirspor
- 1986–1987: Samsunspor
- 1988–1989: Eskişehirspor
- 1989: Sakaryaspor
- 1989–1990: Samsunspor
- 1995–1996: Altay Izmir
- 1996: Denizlispor
- 1996: Altay Izmir
- 1997: Samsunspor
- 1997–1998: Gaziantepspor
- 1998: Dardanelspor
- 1998–1999: Ankaragucu
- 2003: Gaziantepspor
- 2003: Elazigspor
- 2011: Velež Mostar
- * Club domestic league appearances and goals

Milorad Mitrovic (born 31 January 1949) is a Serbian professional football coach and a player. Mitrovic started his club playing career in his hometown FK Šumadija Aranđelovac, where he played through youth categories to senior team, competing in the Yugoslav Second League. His soccer reputation, however, was established as an accomplished coach with over 35 years of coaching experience in different European teams.

== Education ==
1967–1971 University of Belgrade, B.A. in Physical education in Belgrade in Serbia

1970 - 1971 Two Years specialization – Football Department under directorship of Professor Vojin Rainović. Diploma granted

1983–1985 Diploma of seminar participation organized by Turkish Football Association under directorship of Director of Keln Football School, Mr. Gero Bisanz and Coach of West Germany Football Association, Mr. Jupp Derwall.

1971–1978 Specialization Theoretical and Practical specialization in prestigious clubs in Serbia, Croatia, the Netherlands and Espania

- FC Red Star - Belgrad (Serbia)
- FC Partizan - Belgrad (Serbia)
- FC Dinamo - Zagreb (Croatia)
- FC Hajduk - Split (Croatia)
- FC Feyenoord - Rotterdam (Netherlands)
- FC Ajax - Amsterdam (Netherlands)
- FC Real Madrid - Madrid (Spain)

2008 - 2009 UEFA " Pro" licence coach FA Serbia

== Professional Coaching Career and Working Experience ==
- 1973 - 1977 FC Šumadija -Aranđelovac, Serbia
- 1973 - 1977 FC Šumadija - Aranđelovac, Serbia
- 1977 - 1980 FC Radnički - Pirot, Serbia
- 1980 - 1981 FC Napredak - Kruševac, Serbia
- 1981 - 1983 FC Eskisehirspor - Eskisehir, Turkey
- 1983 - 1984 FC Altay - Izmir, Turkey
- 1984 - 1985 FC Lirija - Prizren, Serbia
- 1985 - 1986 FC Eskisehir - Eskisehir, Turkey
- 1986 - 1988 FC Samsunspor -Samsun, Turkey
- 1988 - 1989 FC Eskisehirspor - Eskisehir, Turkey
- 1989 - 1990 FC Sakaryaspor - Sakarya, Turkey
- 1990 - 1991 FC Samsunspor - Samsun, Turkey
- 1992 - 1993 FC Keytan - Kuwayt, Kuwayt
- 1993 - 1994 FC Evagoras - Pafos, Cyprus
- 1994 - 1995 FC APOP - Pafos, Cyprus
- 1995 - 1996 FC Altay - Izmir, Turkey
- 1996 - 1997 FC Denizlispor - Denizli, Turkey
- 1997 - 1998 FC Samsunspor - Samsun, Turkey
- 1998 - 1999 FC Gaziantepspor - Gaziantep, Turkey
- 1999 - 2000 FC Ankaragucu - Ankara, Turkey
- 2000 - 2001 FC Dardanelspor - Canakale, Turkey
- 2002 - 2003 FC Gaziantepspor - Gaziantep, Turkey
- 2003 - 2005 FC Elazigspor - Elazig, Turkey
- 2005 - 2007 FC Dardanelspor - Canakale, Turkey
- 2007 - 2010 FC Eskisehirspor - Eskisehir, Turkey
