= Milorad Mitrović (poet) =

Serbian poet

- Born: 20 February 1867; Belgrade, Principality of Serbia
- Died: 15 May 1907 (aged 40); Belgrade, Kingdom of Serbia

Milorad J. Mitrović (Serbian Cyrillic: Милорад Ј. Митровић; 20 February 1867 – 15 May 1907) was a Serbian lyrical poet.

== Biography ==
He was born in Belgrade in February 1867, and was educated at the grammar school there. He graduated from law school at Belgrade's Velika škola, and was called to the bar in 1891. Mitrović was appointed to the courthouse in Užice. He also served in the same capacity in Čačak, Mionica, Smederevo and Knjaževac, and became a judge in 1897. He was relieved of his duties the following year, for political reasons.

Under the new administration in 1900 he accepted the appointment of judge in Šabac, and later was named secretary of the Appeal Court in Belgrade. In the discharge of his important duties he greatly endeared himself to the Serbian people. The spirit in which he acted and the aims which he steadily set before himself contributed to the allaying of party animosities, to the promotion of a willing submission to the laws, to the property of trade and to the extension and improvement of education. Concerning the great issues of the day, his views were opposed to those of the government. This led to his recall by the government in 1903, a step which proved deeply unpopular. He pleaded for justice, and that same year he was reinstated as secretary of the Appeal Court.

He was secretary of the Appeal Court when he died on 15 May 1907, a victim of tuberculosis.

== Works ==
He came to write poetry under the influence of his friend, Vojislav Ilić. In flowing verse, without many personal references, he used motifs from medieval Western Europe, described his own experiences, his rebellion against the government of oppression, his horror of the social system that existed at the time, etc.

Mitrovic is best known for "Knjige o ljubavi" (Book About Love, 1899) and his political satire, "Prigodne pesme" (Commemorative Songs, 1903). He left several unfinished epic poems, including "Penelopa". After the death of Vojislav Ilić, for a time the most outstanding Serbian lyrist was Milorad Mitrović. Considered one of the finest and most promising poets of his generation before he too died an untimely death, like the great poet, Vojislav Ilić, both victims of consumption. Ilić's influence was not limited only to Mitrović but encompassed young poets who started writing during the 1890s. Among these poets were Jovan Dučić, Mileta Jakšić and Aleksa Šantić.

Many of Mitrović's poems were transcribed into songs. A good illustration are such popular songs as: "Bila jednom ruza jedna" (There Once Was a Rose); "Svinja reformator" (Pig Reformer); "Don Ramiro"; "Papučica" (Slippers); and "Sigurna Pesma" (Certain Song).
