= Djordje Natošević =

Serbian physician and pedagogue (1821–1887)

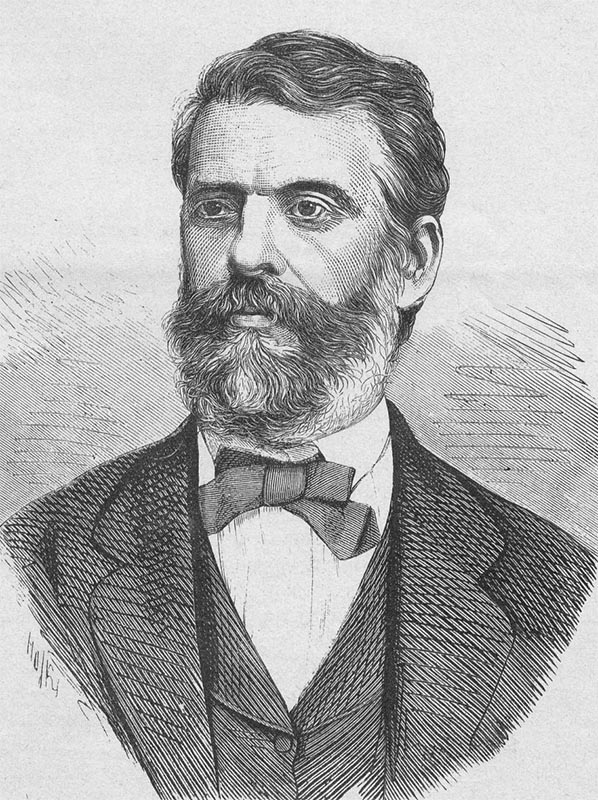
Djordje Natošević

Đorđe Natošević (Serbian:Ђорђе Натошевић; 19 July 1821 — 11 July 1887) was one of the first Serbian pedagogues and pedagogical writers, an educational worker, the superintendent of Serbian schools in Austro-Hungary, the first textbook written according to Vuk Karadžić's spelling reform, the founder of teachers' schools in Pakrac, Novi Sad, Karlovac and Pančevo; founded, edited and published the first Serbian pedagogic newspaper, Školski List; and the first Serbian children's newspaper, "Friend of Serbian Youth".

== Biography ==
He was born in Slankamen, Principality of Serbia. Djordje Natošević completed his medical studies in Vienna in 1850 and began his medical practice in Novi Sad. He soon became an educator. In time, he became the director of the Novi Sad High School in 1853, the superintendent of Serbian schools in Austria-Hungary, and the chief school officer for Vojvodina. He was a member of Parliament and President of Matica srpska (1881 - 1887). To his credit, Serbian teachers' schools were opened throughout the Vojvodina region. He founded and edited the first Serbian pedagogical, "School Gazette", and the first children's newspaper, "Friend of Serbian Youth", in which Jovan Jovanović Zmaj published his first poems for children at the urging of Djordje Natošević. He is the first textbook writer for Vuk's correct spelling. His "Letter" was in use in all Serbian schools. He abolished his literary book using the old, long-used spelling method and introduced obvious practical teaching methods. In addition to his pedagogical work, he authored two of the most significant pedagogical manuals, "A short guide for Serbian folk teachers" (1857) and an amended edition, published in Novi Sad (1861), and the second entitled: "Instructions for teaching literary science" to teachers of national colleges in the Austrian Empire, written in 1858 (Uputstvo za predavane bukvarski nauka učiteljima narodnih učilišta u Austrijskom Carstvu). In 1864, he also wrote "Our Flaws, Our Woes and Enemies of our Prince and Serbian Government (Naše Mane, Naši Jadi i protivnici knijaza i vlade srpske). In them, he outlined, in general, all his pedagogical, didactic and methodical understandings, which formed the theoretical basis for the reform of Serbian schools in the Habsburg monarchy at the beginning of the second half of the 19th century. In his instructional and pedagogical work, Natošević emphasized the importance of music teaching so that the second chapter in the book "A short guide for Serbian folk teachers" is entirely devoted to "Singing Science" and practical methodical instructions. He argued that singing for children is a need, a natural gift, that they are most mentally strengthened by singing and that even the most difficult teaching units can be overcome very easily, quickly and without difficulty. In addition to church chanting, he also started notal singing with the obligatory singing of world folk and art songs, then polyphonic "harmonic singing" and playing on some musical instrument - piano, violin, accordion and more. He is the author of the "School Decree". He also wrote a treatise "Why are the people of Austria failing?" He is buried in Church of the Dormition burial ground in Novi Sad.

He was married to Dafina, the daughter of Grigorije Jovšić (1806-1862), Mayor of Novi Sad.

== See also ==
- Dositej Obradović
- Avram Mrazović
