= Milorad Bojic =

Serbian scientist

Milorad Bojic (Zemun, January 4, 1951 — Kragujevac, January 22, 2016) was a doctor of technical sciences and a full professor at the Faculty of Engineering Sciences at the University of Kragujevac, and from 2015 a corresponding member of the SANU Department of Technical Sciences. He published in energy recovery, thermal comfort, finite-time thermodynamics, integration, thermo economy, global warming and air conditioning engineering.

== Biography ==
Milorad Bojić graduated from the Faculty of Mechanical Engineering of the University of Belgrade, Department in Kragujevac in 1974, and received his master's degree from the University of Syracuse, US, in 1977 at the Department of Mechanical and Aerospace Engineering, on the topic Two Dimensional Mathematical Model of Non-Buoyant Jet in a Cross - Flow. He received his doctorate at the Faculty of Engineering Sciences of the University of Kragujevac (then the Faculty of Mechanical Engineering of the University of Kragujevac) in 1984, where he continued his academic career and worked as a full professor at the Department of Energy and Process Engineering. At the Faculty of Engineering Sciences of the University of Kragujevac, he was vice-dean for science 1989–1991, head of the Department of Energy and Process Technology, manager of the Regional Center for Energy Management and manager of the Center for Heating, Air Conditioning and Solar Energy.

=== Professional titles ===
Milorad Bojić worked at the Faculty of Engineering Sciences of the University of Kragujevac as: assistant (1974–1984), assistant professor (1984–1990), associate professor (1990–1995) and full professor from 1995 to 2016. At Syracuse University he was a Research Assistant and Technical Officer (1976–1978); at the Hong Kong Polytechnic University, research professor (1999–2001); visiting professor at Nagoya University in Japan in 1997, at Hong Kong Polytechnic University from 2001 to 2003, at University of Reunion in France from 2009 to 2011 and at the National University of Applied Sciences (INSA) in Lyon, France in 2012.

== Selected publications ==
=== Books ===
- Termotehnika (Thermotechnics) 1987, COBISS 512117397.
- Termodinamika (Thermodynamics) 2011, COBISS 184810508.
- Vazdušni mlaz u poprečnoj vazdušnoj struji (Air jet in cross air current) 1987, COBISS 32150535.

=== Papers ===
- Kalogirou, Soteris A.; Bojic, Milorad (2000-05-01). "Artificial neural networks for the prediction of the energy consumption of a passive solar building". Energy. 25 (5): 479–491. Bibcode:2000Ene....25..479K. doi:10.1016/S0360-5442(99)00086-9. ISSN 0360-5442.
- Bojic, M; Yik, F; Sat, P (2001-07-01). "Influence of thermal insulation position in building envelope on the space cooling of high-rise residential buildings in Hong Kong". Energy and Buildings. 33 (6): 569–581. Bibcode:2001EneBu..33..569B. doi:10.1016/S0378-7788(00)00125-0. ISSN 0378-7788.
- Bojic, M.; Trifunovic, N.; Papadakis, G.; Kyritsis, S. (1997-12-01). "Numerical simulation, technical and economic evaluation of air-to-earth heat exchanger coupled to a building". Energy. 22 (12): 1151–1158. Bibcode:1997Ene....22.1151B. doi:10.1016/S0360-5442(97)00055-8. ISSN 0360-5442.
- Bojić, Milorad; Nikolić, Novak; Nikolić, Danijela; Skerlić, Jasmina; Miletić, Ivan (2011-07-01). "Toward a positive-net-energy residential building in Serbian conditions". Applied Energy. 88 (7): 2407–2419. Bibcode:2011ApEn...88.2407B. doi:10.1016/j.apenergy.2011.01.011. ISSN 0306-2619.
- Bojic, M; Yik, F; Leung, W (2002-01-01). "Thermal insulation of cooled spaces in high rise residential buildings in Hong Kong". Energy Conversion and Management. 43 (2): 165–183. Bibcode:2002ECM....43..165B. doi:10.1016/S0196-8904(01)00018-8. ISSN 0196-8904.
