= SCH (band) =

Bosnian band

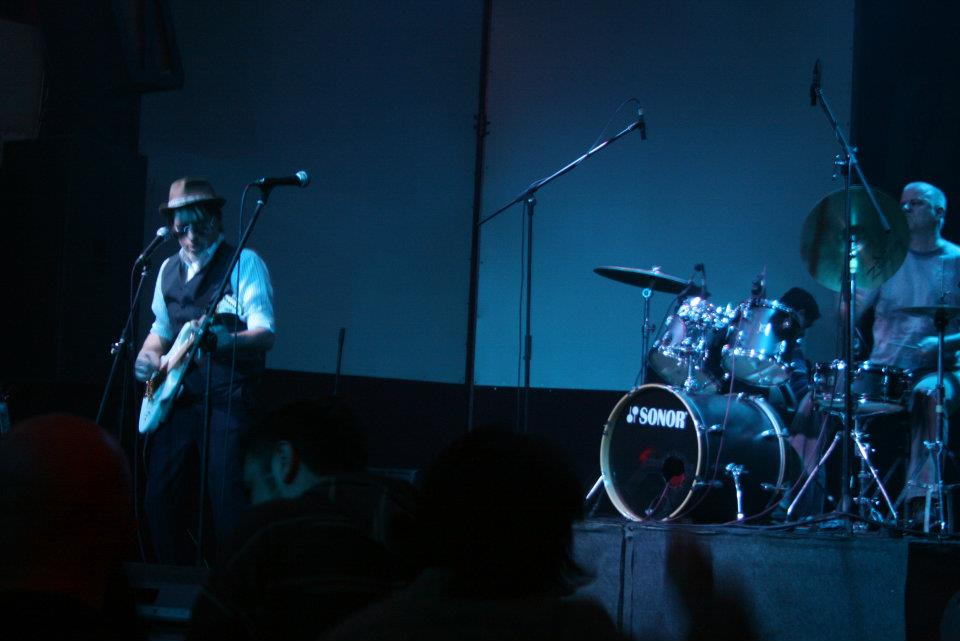
- SCH in concert Sarajevo (2012)

Background information
- Origin: Bosnia and Herzegovina
- Genres: Industrial rock; experimental; post-punk; noise rock; alternative rock; electro-industrial; techno
- Years active: 1983–present
- Members: Senad Hadžimusić Teno; Various
- Past members: Mila Mikanović, Branko Đurić, Saša Petrović, Petar Erak, Zlatan Hadžić, Elmir Imamović Elči, Sveto Ignjatović, Nenad Kosović, Samir Bjelanović, Goran Obradović Granon, Danijel Prebanić, Slobodan Aličehajić Bodo, Armin Bezdrob, Armin Bušatlić, Damir Avdić Graha, and others
- Website: sch.ba

SCH (an abbreviation for "Schizophrenia") is the musical and artistic project and band (or rather the band-alterego) of Senad Hadžimusić, who is better known by his nickname Teno. Formed in the early-eighties in Sarajevo, the band has had an intensive creative and live existence. SCH represents one of the most significant names in the field of alternative rock music in the former Yugoslavia. Radio Student Ljubljana's Igor Bašin has noted: "As Ljubljana's got Laibach and Belgrade's got EKV and Disciplina Kičme alias Šarlo Akrobata, thus Sarajevo's got SCH. SCH is the key-name of the Sarajevo Alternative Scene." Bosnian writer Miljenko Jergović once described SCH as "...a group of Sarajevan alternative maniacs who have, infinitely and into infinity, dissipated more wild energy and artificial rebellion than one could fit into all the gothic underground cellars from Hamburg to London."

== SCH Music ==
SCH's constantly changing, radically unconventional and experimental music is sometimes cursorily referred as "a mix of Laibach, modern dance electronica, punk edge and Bosnian folklore."

A number of reviewers have commented on the precise, determined, and industrial aspects of their sound and production, shared by German industrial, noise, and Krautrock bands. Eldin Hadžović notes in BH Dani, "Noise has been a common denominator in the band's 20-year-old work, during which numerous line-ups have styles came and went, together with high and lows (the latter principally being a long production/performing pause)... SCH has not deviated one inch from its principal task - to serve as a mirror to our reality, seen through the prism of schizophrenia... SCH sounds like nothing that came before them, or anything that may come after they’ve gone."

=== Milestones and influences ===
- In its earliest phase (1983–1984), SCH's music was mixture of new wave, punk and psychedelia. Early influences included Gang of Four, Brian Eno, Frank Zappa, Captain Beefheart, Patti Smith, Lou Reed, Iggy Pop and King Crimson.
- SCH's second phase began in early 1985, continuing from an emphasis on recording and performance to a study of war, which became a theme in prior to and throughout the Yugoslav wars. This period (1985–1991) was characterized by radicalization of the band's sound and its shifting from post-new wave into harsh noise and industrial. Influences during this period included Swans, Sonic Youth, Throbbing Gristle, SPK, D.A.F. and early Einstürzende Neubauten.
- SCH continued to perform and record during the Siege of Sarajevo (1992–1995), but disbanded for several years thereafter, following a 1995 performance in Prague. During the hiatus (1995–2002), Teno published a book of SCH lyrics as well as During Wartime... Again!.
- VRIL (2002) marked a new and still actual phase in the band's development, in which electronic instrumentation and sampling have largely replaced its former, "classic" line-up of guitar, bass and drums.

== Live line-up ==
As of 2007, SCH live consists of Senad Hadžimusić Teno on vocals/guitars/synths; Rida Attarashany on synths/rhythm machine.

== Discography ==
=== Albums ===
- SCH (1987)
- During Wartime (1989)
- White Music: Two Ways To German Art & Work Discipline (1992)
- The Gentle Art of Firing (1995)
- During Wartime... Again! (1999)
- VRIL (2002)
- Eat This! (2004)
- Deluge and After (2006)
- Only Cunts Don't Fear the Rain (2006)
- SCH Live (2007)
- Dance (2007)
- SCH Glut (2011)
- SCH The Last (2013)

=== Other releases ===
- SCH Dirty Lo-Fi Archive 1984–2008 (2008)

=== Singles ===
- "Otto" (2018)

SCH's music has also been featured in a number of films and radio programs, as well as in the theater.
