= Milorad Pejić =

Bosnian poet (born 1960)

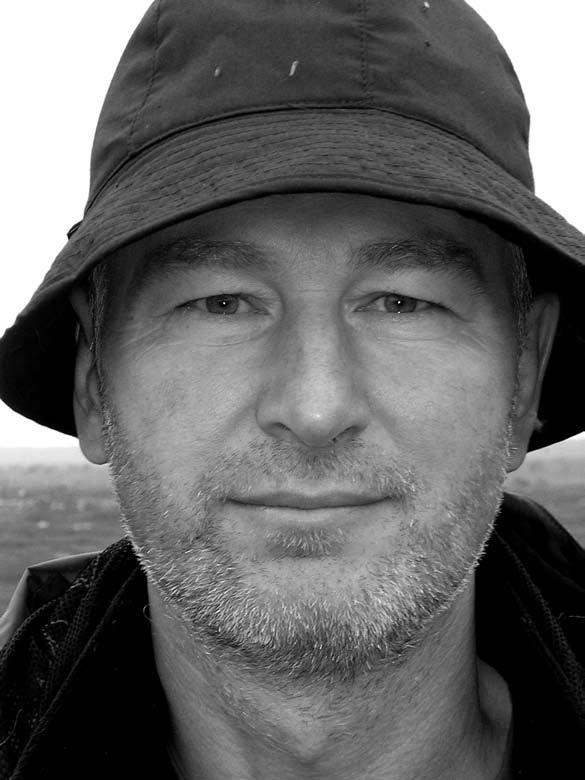
- Born: 8 April 1960 (age 65); Tuzla, SFR Yugoslavia
- Education: University of Sarajevo; Luleå University of Technology
- Occupation: Poet
- Known for: Poetry

Milorad Pejić (1960 in Tuzla, Bosnia and Herzegovina, former Yugoslavia) is a Bosnian poet who resides in Sweden.

== Biography ==
After attending elementary and high school in his hometown of Tuzla, Pejić attended the University of Sarajevo, where he studied economics. Following graduation he returned to Tuzla, and in 1992, following the outbreak of the Bosnian War, he immigrated to Sweden, where he now lives.

== Books ==
- The Vase for the Lily Plant / Vaza za biljku krin (1985)
- The Eyes of Keyholes / Oči ključaonica / Schlossaugen (2001) (2012) (2015)
- Hyperborea (2011) (2013) (2016) (2018)
- The Third Life / Treći život (2015) (2019)
- True Stories / Sanna historier, poetry collection in Swedish (2019)
- True Stories: selected poems (in Czeche) / Pravdivé příběhy: vybrané básně (2020)
- True stories / Istinite priče (2023)
- All poems / Sve pjesme (2024)

== Awards ==
- November 2012: Slovo Makovo - Mak Dizdar
