= Senad Hadžimusić =

Bosnian musician, songwriter and poet

Senad Hadžimusić-Teno

Background information
- Also known as: Teno, SCH
- Born: Senad Hadžimusić; Sarajevo, SR Bosnia and Herzegovina, Yugoslavia
- Occupations: Musician, Composer, Songwriter, Poet
- Years active: 1983–present
- Website: Official website

Senad Hadžimusić-Teno is a Bosnian musician most known as the founder, songwriter, producer, singer, and guitarist of the Sarajevo-based alternative rock band SCH. Teno has authored, produced, and recorded 12 official albums and published the bilingual (English/Bosnian) lyrics book "SCH - Songs and Tales.". His music has also been featured in several films, radio programs, and theatre productions.
