= Tourism in Vojvodina =

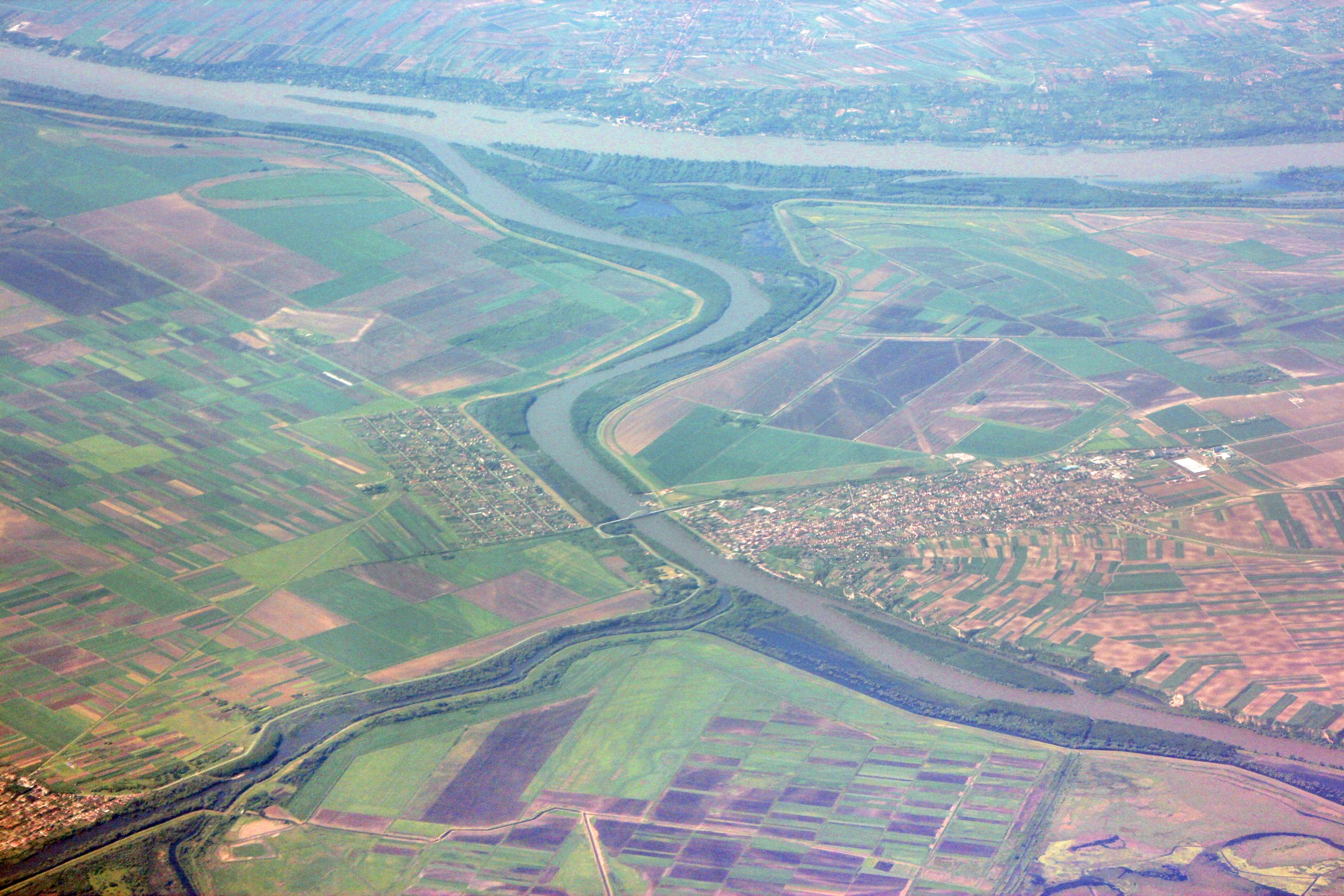
The Tisza and Danube confluence in Knićanin

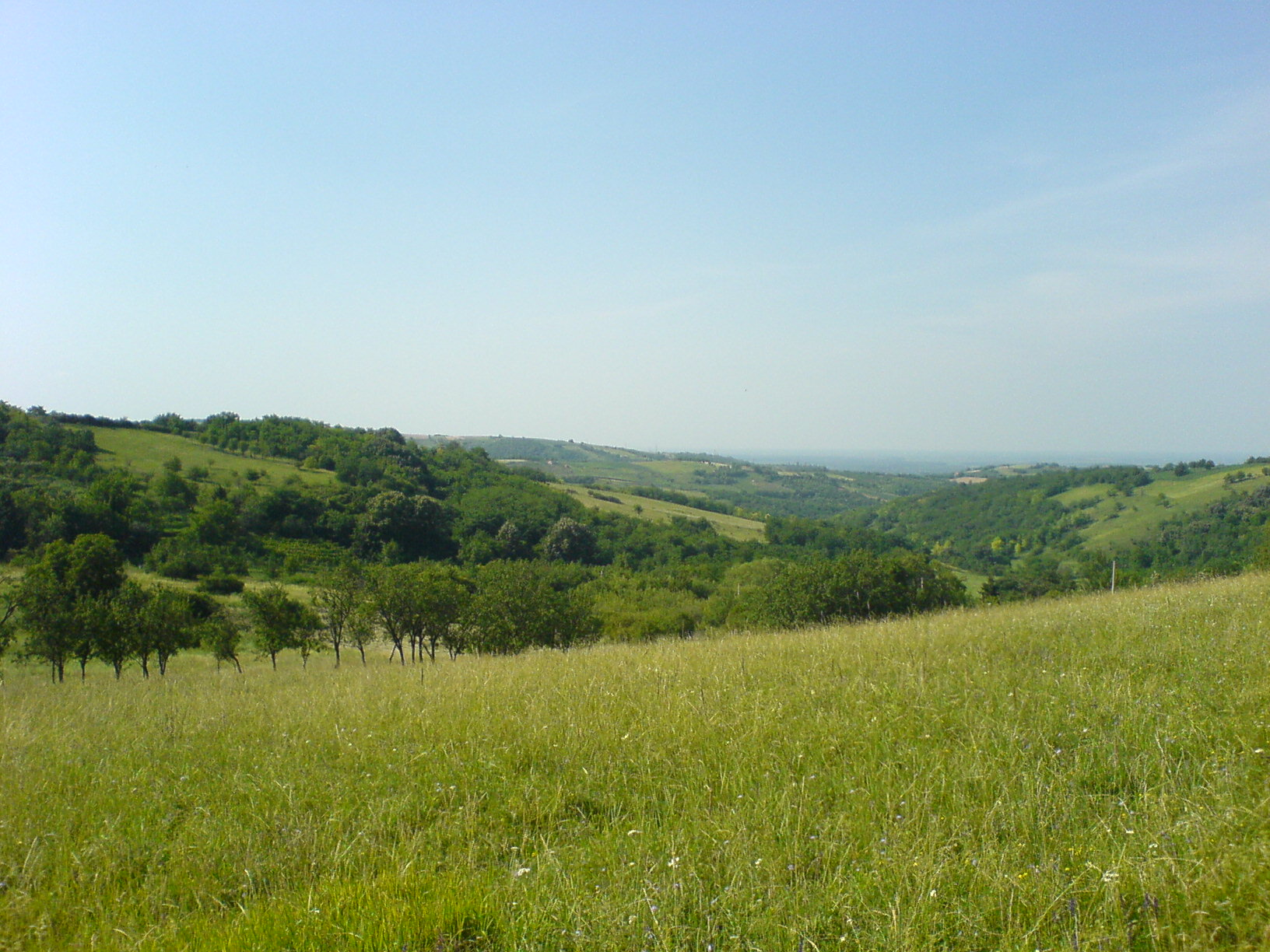
Fruška Gora National Park

The Autonomous Province of Vojvodina is an autonomous province of Serbia, located in the northern part of the country, in the Pannonian Plain of Central Europe. Novi Sad is the largest city and administrative center of Vojvodina and the second largest city in Serbia. Vojvodina has a population over 1.93 million (approximately 26.88% of Serbia excluding Kosovo and 21.56% including Kosovo). It has a multi-ethnic and multi-cultural identity, with a number of mechanisms for the promotion of minority rights; there are more than 26 ethnic groups in the province, which has six official languages. Most of Vojvodina is a flat terrain, but there are several mountain areas such are Fruška Gora, Vršac Mountains, Titelski Breg, and Zagajička Brda, as well as sandy areas such are Deliblatska Peščara (nicknamed "the European Sahara"), and Subotička Peščara.

There are also many water areas in Vojvodina, including rivers, lakes, bogs, as well as artificial canals used for agricultural production and water traffic (most notable of those is Danube-Tisa-Danube Canal). Main rivers in the area are Danube, Sava, Tisa, Begej, Tamiš, Karaš, Bosut, etc., while main lakes and bogs are Palić lake, Ludoš lake, Ledinci lake, Rusanda lake and Obed bog.

== Hunting and fishing ==
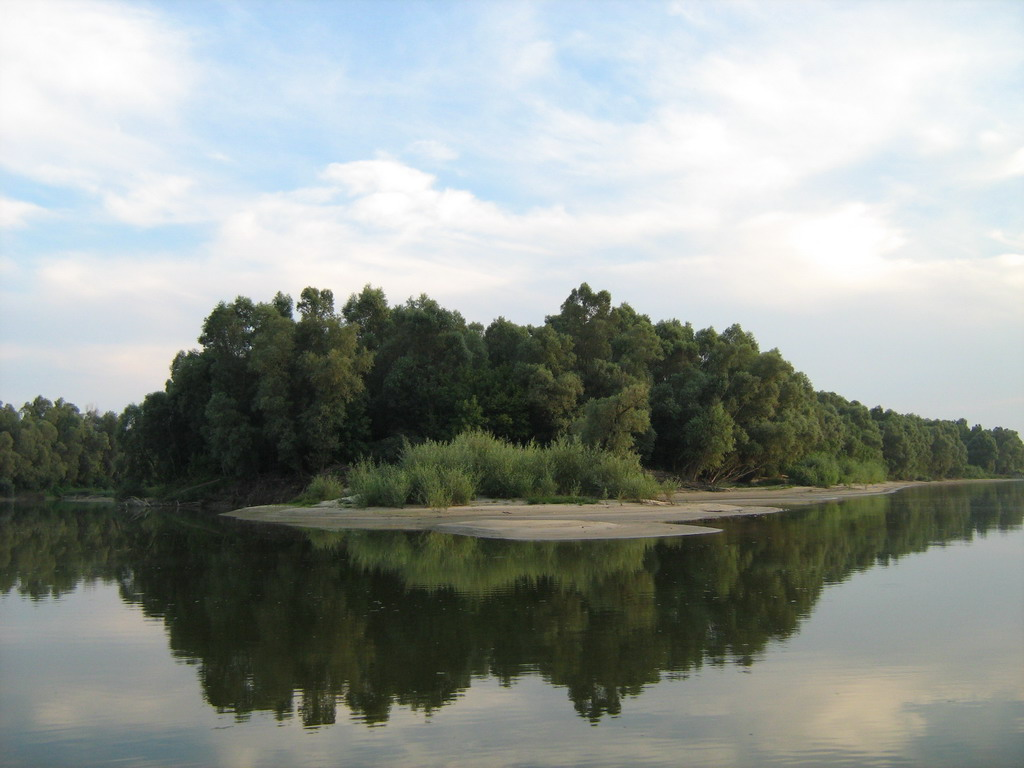
Danube river at Gornje Podunavlje Nature Reserve

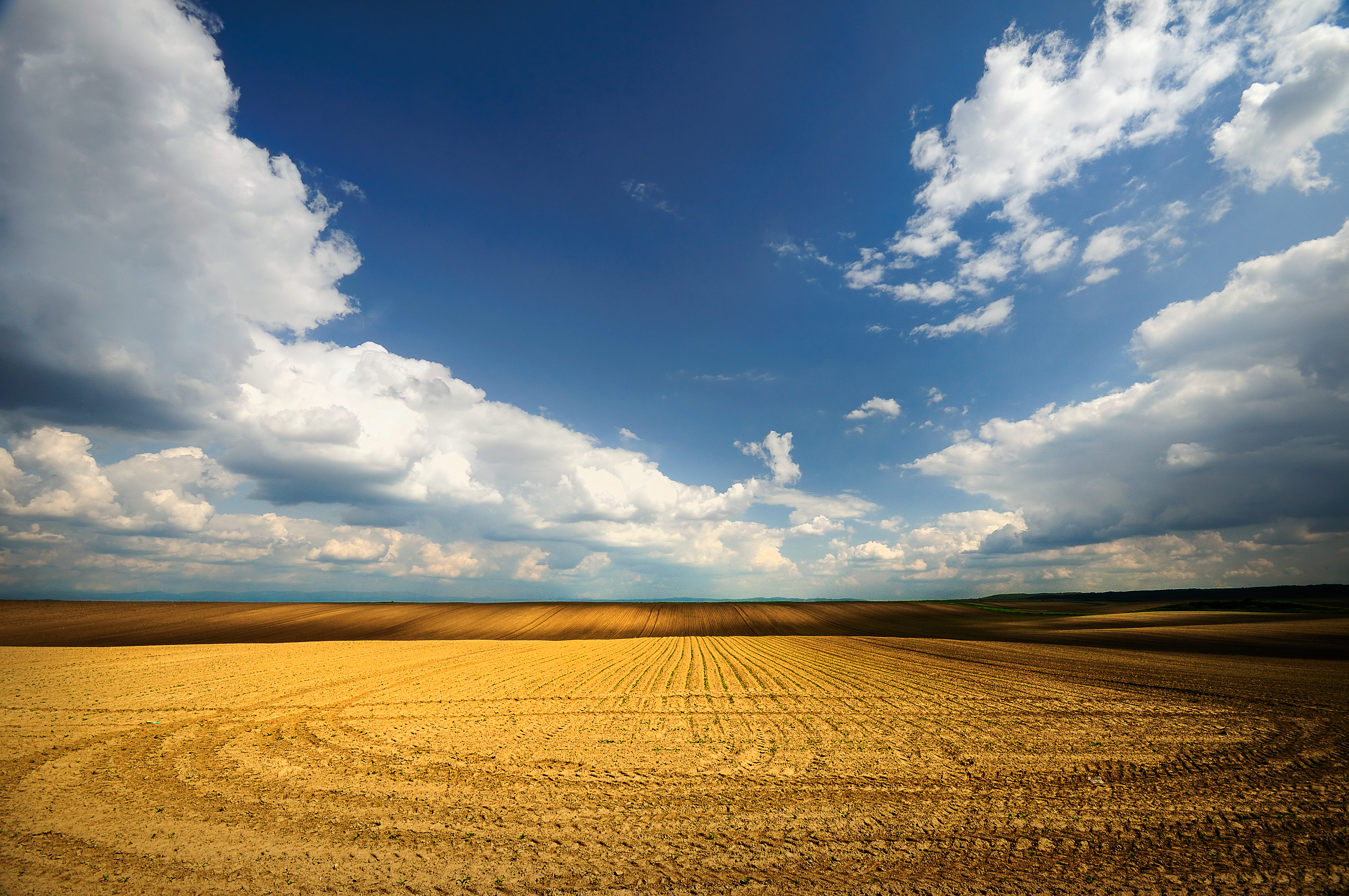
Deliblato Sands

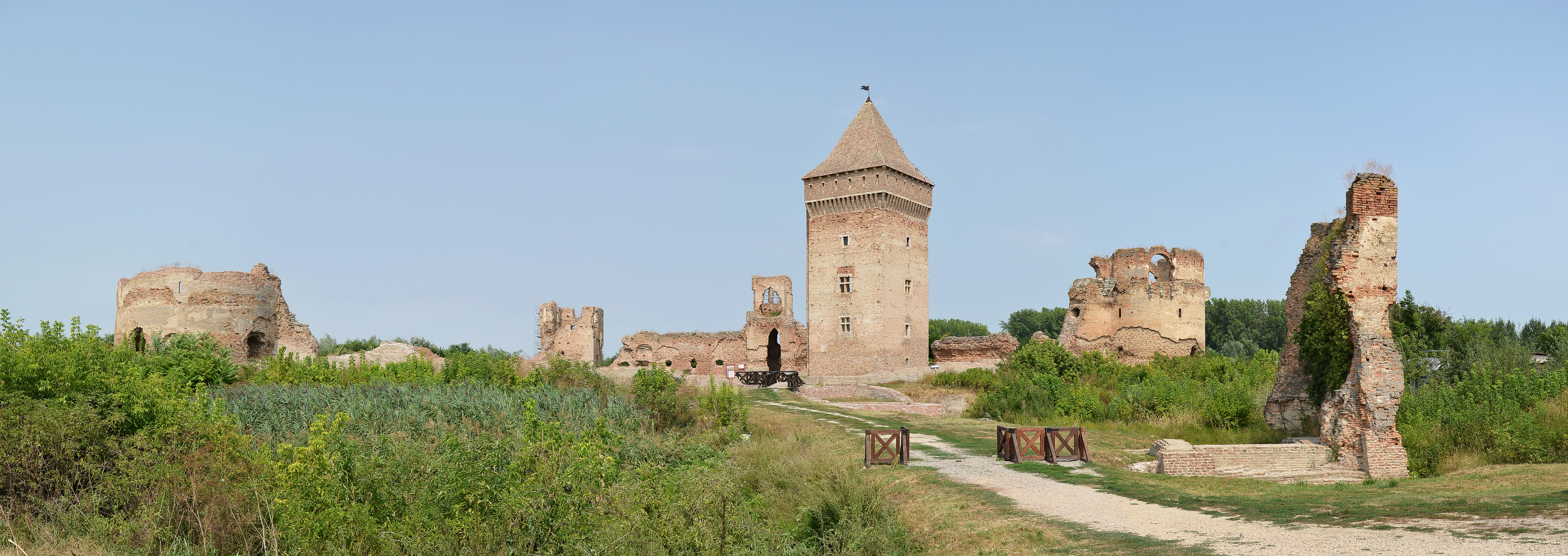
Bač Fortress

Hunting grounds in Vojvodina include agricultural lands and forests. Main agricultural hunting grounds in Vojvodina are located near Bečej, Senta, Kanjiža, Novi Kneževac, Ečka, Novo Miloševo, Padej, Kikinda, Ada, and Sombor. Main forest hunting grounds are located in Posavina (near river Sava), Podunavlje (near river Danube), Fruška Gora, Vršac Mountains, Deliblatska Peščara, and Subotička Peščara. Hunted animals include rabbits, deer, different sorts of birds, boars, mouflons, etc.

Main fishing grounds in Vojvodina are located on the Danube river near Apatin, Sombor, Bačka Palanka and Novi Sad, on the Sava river near Sremska Mitrovica, on the Bosut river near Šid, on Obedska bara in Syrmia, on the Palić lake in Bačka, on the Danube-Tisa-Danube Canal, on rivers Tisa and Tamiš, as well as on the lakes and channels in southern Banat, near Bela Crkva and Kovin.

== Festivals ==
=== Food festivals ===
Some of the main food festivals in Vojvodina include:

- Bostanijada (watermelon festival) in Šašinci, held in August
- Bostanijada (watermelon festival) in Rivica, held in August
- Bostanijada (watermelon festival) in Silbaš, held in July
- Chicken fest (chicken festival) in Žitište, held in September
- Gulašijada (goulash festival) in Debeljača, held in May

=== Drink festivals ===
Wine production in Vojvodina has a very long tradition and dates back to Roman emperor Probus (276–282), who was born in Sirmium (modern Sremska Mitrovica in Vojvodina) and who planted first plants of Vitis vinifera in Fruška Gora.

Some of the main drink festivals in Vojvodina include:

- Dani Vina (wine days) in Mali Iđoš, held in February
- Dani Vinara i Vinogradara – Sveti Vinko (wine days – Saint Vinko) in Subotica, held in January
- Dani Vinara i Vinogradara – Sveti Trifun (wine days – Saint Trifun) in Subotica, held in February
- Dani Berbe Grožđa (vintage days) in Vršac, held in September
- Grožđebal (grapes and wine festival) in Sremski Karlovci, held in September

== Cultural heritage ==
=== Serbian Orthodox monasteries ===
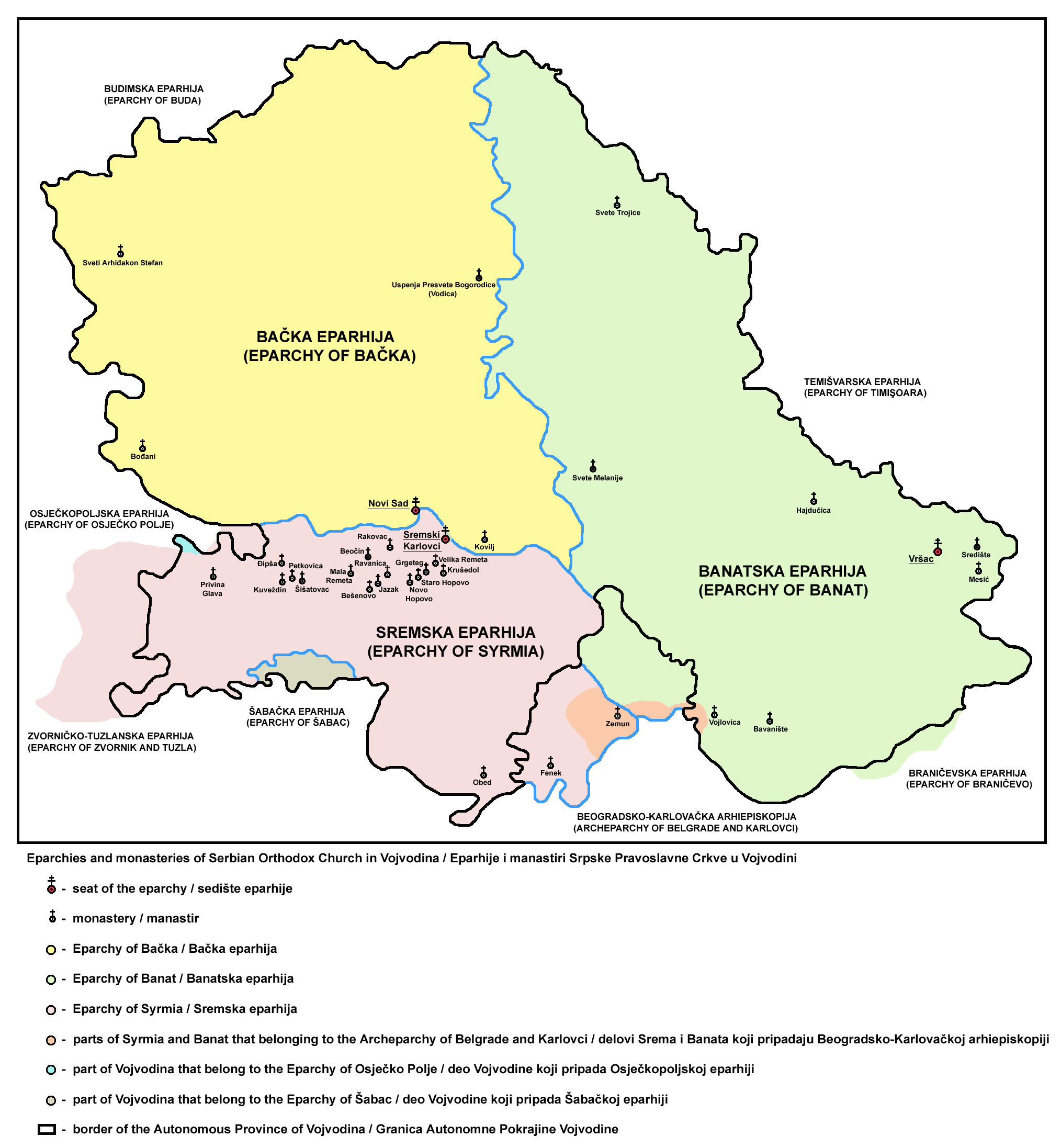
Map showing the monasteries of The Serbian Orthodox Church in Vojvodina

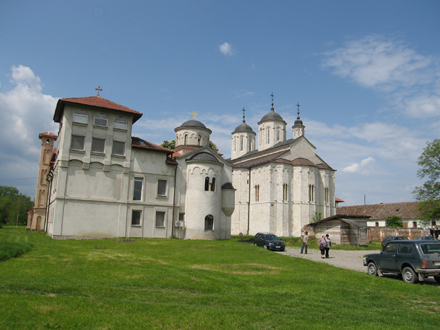
Kovilj Monastery

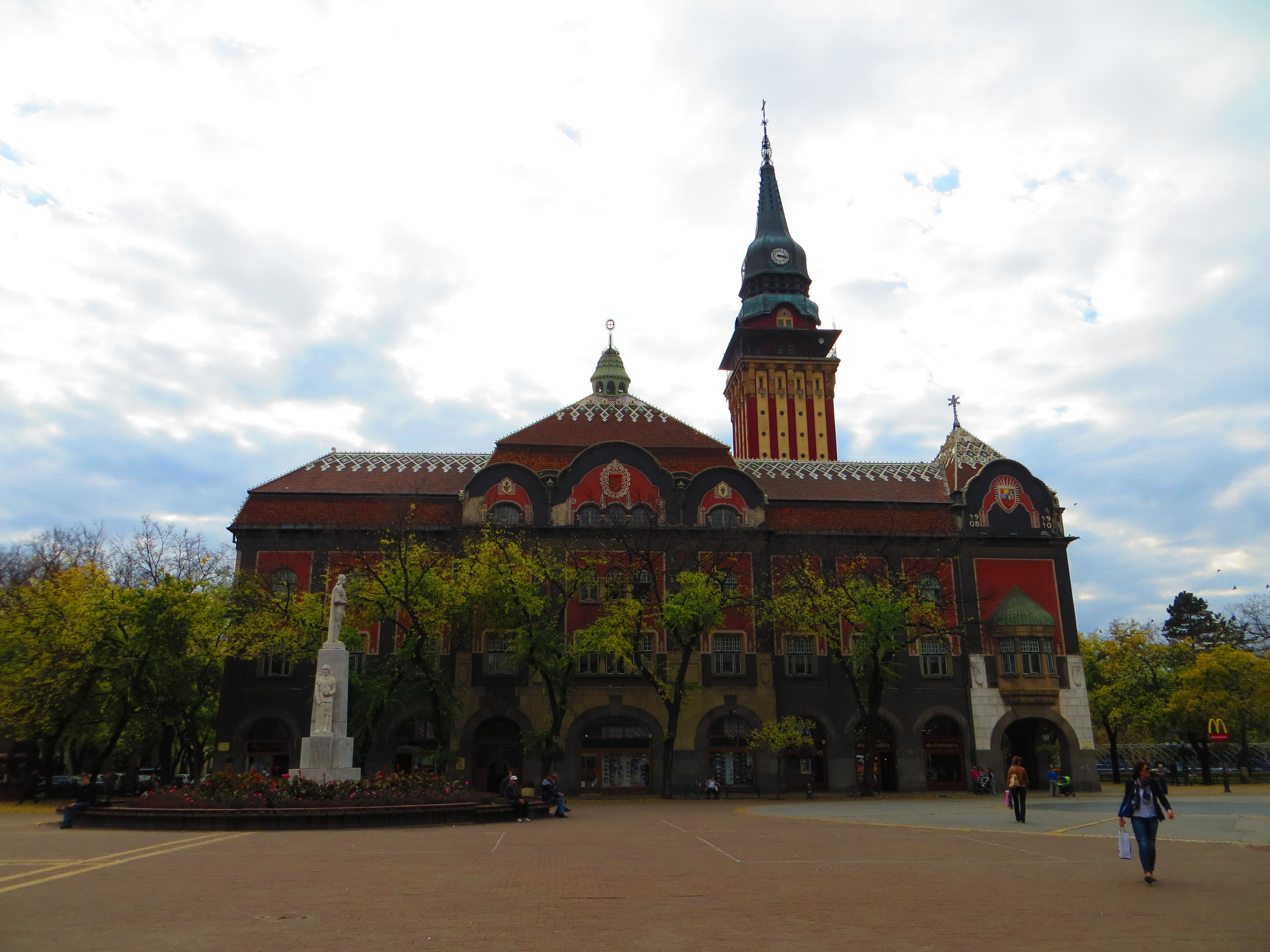
Subotica City Hall

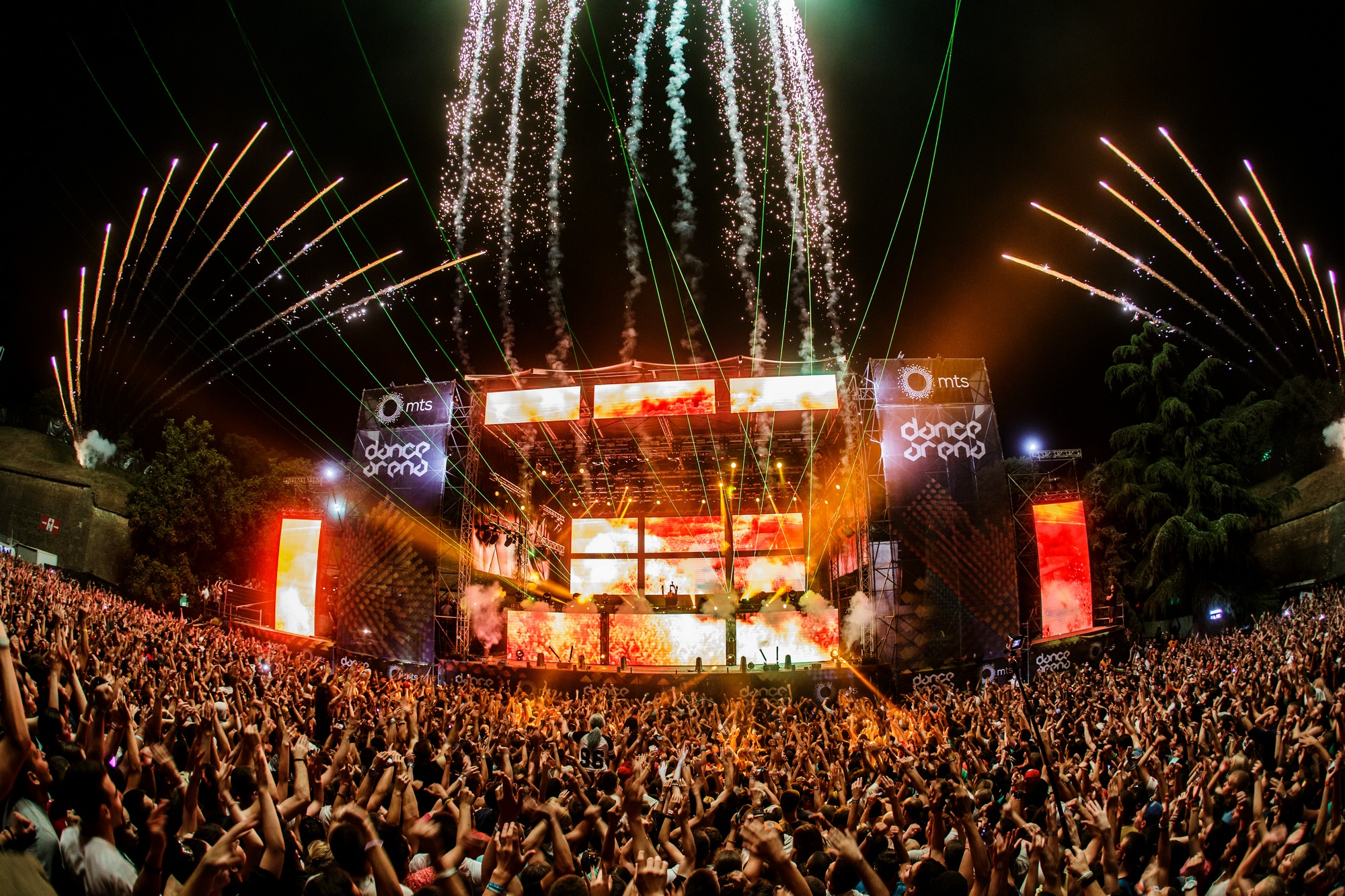
EXIT Music Festival

- Beočin – The time of founding is unknown. It is first mentioned in Turkish records dated in 1566–1567.
- Bešenovo – According to the legend, the monastery of Bešenovo was founded by Serbian king Dragutin at the end of the 13th century. The earliest historical records about the Monastery are dated in 1545.
- Velika Remeta – Traditionally, its founding is linked to the king Dragutin. The earliest historical records about the Monastery are dated in 1562.
- Vrdnik-Ravanica – The exact time of its founding is unknown. The records indicate that the church was built during the time of Metropolitan Serafim, in the second half of the 16th century.
- Grgeteg – According to tradition the monastery was founded by Zmaj Ognjeni Vuk (despot Vuk Grgurević), in 1471. The earliest historical records about the Monastery are dated in 1545–1546.
- Divša – It is believed to have been founded by despot Jovan Branković in the late 15th century. The earliest historical records about the Monastery are dated in the second half of the 16th century.
- Jazak – The monastery was founded in 1736.
- Krušedol – The monastery was founded between 1509 and 1516, by bishop Maksim (despot Đorđe Branković) and his mother Angelina.
- Kuveždin – Traditionally, its foundation is ascribed to Stefan Štiljanović. The first reliable records of it are dated in 1566–1569.
- Mala Remeta – The foundation is traditionally ascribed to the Serbian king Dragutin. The earliest historical records about the Monastery are dated in the middle of the 16th century.
- Novo Hopovo – According to tradition, the monastery was built by the Despots of the Branković family. The first reliable mention of monastery is dated in 1641.
- Privina Glava – According to the legends, Privina Glava was founded by a man named Priva, in the 12th century. The earliest historical records about the Monastery are dated in 1566–1567.
- Petkovica – According to the tradition, founded by the widow of Stefan Štiljanović, despotess Jelena. The earliest historical records about the Monastery are dated in 1566–1567.
- Rakovac – According to a legend written in 1704, Rakovac is the heritage of a certain man, Raka, courtier of despot Jovan Branković. The legend states that Raka erected the monastery in 1498. The earliest historical records about the Monastery are dated in 1545–1546.
- Staro Hopovo – According to the tradition, the monastery was founded by bishop Maksim (despot Đorđe Branković). The reliable data about the monastery date back to 1545–1546.
- Šišatovac – The foundation of the Monastery is ascribed to the refugee monks from the Serbian monastery of Žiča. The reliable facts illustrating the life of the monastery date back from the mid 16th century.
- Kovilj monastery in Novi Sad municipality. The monastery was reconstructed in 1705–1707. According to the legend, the monastery of Kovilj was founded by the first Serb archbishop Saint Sava in the 13th century.
- Bođani monastery in Bač municipality. It was founded in 1478.
- Mesić monastery in Vršac municipality. It was founded in the 15th century.
- Vojlovica monastery in Pančevo municipality. It was founded during the time of despot Stefan Lazarević (1374–1427).
- Holy Trinity monastery in Kikinda. It was built in 1885–87 as a foundation of Melanija Nikolić-Gajčić.
- Bavanište monastery in Kovin municipality. It was founded in the 15th century and was destroyed in 1716. It was rebuilt in 1858.
- Središte monastery in Vršac municipality. It was founded in the 15th century.

=== Other important sites ===
- Ruins of ancient Roman city of Sirmium (one of four capitals of Roman Empire) in Sremska Mitrovica.
- Bač Fortress from 12th–14th century near Bač.
- Vrdnik Tower from 12th–13th century near Vrdnik.
- Ruins of Arača church from 1230 near Novi Bečej.
- Ruins of Kupinik fortress from 14th century near Kupinovo, the former seat of Serbian despots in Syrmia.
- Vršac Tower from 15th century near Vršac.

== See also ==
- Tourism in Serbia
