= Eparchy of Srem =

Diocese of the Serbian Orthodox Church

- Saint Nicholas Cathedral, Sremski Karlovci

Location
- Territory: Syrmia
- Headquarters: Palace of the Patriarchate, Sremski Karlovci, Serbia

Information
- Denomination: Eastern Orthodox
- Sui iuris church: Serbian Orthodox Church
- Established: 15th century
- Cathedral: Saint Nicholas Cathedral, Sremski Karlovci
- Language: Church Slavonic, Serbian

Current leadership
- Bishop: Vasilije Vadić

Map

Website
- Eparchy of Srem

The Eparchy of Srem (Serbian: Епархија сремска, romanized: Eparhija sremska, lit. 'Eparchy of Syrmia') is a diocese (eparchy) of the Serbian Orthodox Church covering Syrmia region in northwestern Serbia and eastern Croatia.

The episcopal see is located at the Saint Nicholas Cathedral, Sremski Karlovci. Its headquarters and bishop's residence, are also in Sremski Karlovci, both located at the Palace of the Patriarchate.

== History ==
=== Historical background ===
The bishopric of Syrmia is one of the oldest ecclesiastical institutions in this part of Southeastern Europe. The Diocese of Pannonia centered in Sirmium was an important ecclesiastical center of the late Roman Empire in the 4th and 5th centuries. The bishopric collapsed after 582 when Sirmium was finally destroyed by the Avars.

After the Christianization of the Slavs, the eparchy was revived, and from 1018 it belonged to the Eastern Orthodox Archbishopric of Ohrid. The region was later conquered by the Kingdom of Hungary, and the eparchy was suppressed at the beginning of the 13th century, while on the same territory the Roman Catholic Diocese of Srijem was established. During the late Middle Ages, remaining Eastern Orthodox Christians in the region of Syrmia came under the jurisdiction of the Serbian Metropolitans of Belgrade. The most notable of these were Maksim Branković (d. 1516), metropolitan of Belgrade and Syrmia, who built the Monastery of Krušedol. During the 16th and 17th centuries they styled themselves as Metropolitans of Belgrade and Syrmia, and the eparchy was under jurisdiction of the Serbian Patriarchate of Peć.

=== Early modern period ===
In 1708, when the autonomous Metropolitanate of Karlovci was created within the Habsburg monarchy, the Eparchy of Srem became the archbishopric of the Metropolitan, whose seat was first in the Krušedol Monastery, and then in Sremski Karlovci. The eparchy remained part of the Patriarchate of Karlovci until the end of World War I.

After the war and the creation of the Kingdom of Yugoslavia, its territory was united with other Serbian Orthodox ecclesiastical provinces to form the unified Serbian Orthodox Church, a process completed in 1920. It came under the administration of Archbishop of Belgrade, who was also the Serbian Patriarch. The final unification of the Eparchy of Srem and the Archdiocese of Belgrade was completed in 1931 as the Archbishopric of Belgrade and Karlovci. During that period, the episcopal administration was delegated to titular bishops as metropolitan vicars.

In 1947, the region of Syrmia was excluded from the Archdiocese of Belgrade and Karlovci, and re-established as the separate Eparchy of Srem. Although the name of the Archdiocese of Belgrade and Karlovci still includes the name of the town of Sremski Karlovci, town is today part of the Eparchy of Srem and not of the Archdiocese of Belgrade and Karlovci.

== List of bishops ==
=== Metropolitans ===
Primate	Tenure	Title
Isidor	(around 1415–1423)	Metropolitan of Belgrade and Syrmia
Grigorije	(around 1438–1440)	Metropolitan of Belgrade and Syrmia
Joanikije	(around 1479)	Metropolitan of Belgrade and Syrmia
Filotej	(since 1481)	Metropolitan of Belgrade and Syrmia
Teofan	(around 1509)	Metropolitan of Belgrade and Syrmia
Maksim Branković	(d. 1516)	Metropolitan of Belgrade and Syrmia
Roman	(around 1532)	under Archbishopric of Ohrid
Longin	(around 1545–1548)	under Archbishopric of Ohrid
Jakov	fl. 1560–61	Archbishop of Belgrade and Syrmia
Serafim	prior to 1588	Metropolitan of Belgrade and Syrmia
Makarije	(c. 1589)	Metropolitan of Belgrade and Syrmia
Luka	(c. 1596)	Metropolitan of Belgrade and Syrmia
Joakim	(around 1607–1611)	Metropolitan of Belgrade and Syrmia
Visarion	fl. 1612	Metropolitan of Belgrade and Syrmia
Avesalom of Belgrade	(around 1631–1632)	Metropolitan of Belgrade and Syrmia
Ilarion	(around 1644–1662)	Metropolitan of Belgrade and Syrmia
Jefrem	(around 1662–1672)	Metropolitan of Belgrade and Syrmia
Elevterije	(around 1673–1678)	Metropolitan of Belgrade and Syrmia
Pajsije	(around 1680–1681)	Metropolitan of Belgrade and Syrmia
Simeon Ljubibratić	(1682–1690)	Metropolitan of Belgrade and Syrmia
Mihailo	(around 1699–1705)	Metropolitan of Belgrade and Syrmia

=== Titular bishops ===
- Maksimilijan Hajdin (1920–1928)
- Irinej Đorđević (1928–1931)
- Tihon Radovanović (1931–1934)
- Sava Trlajić (1934–1938)
- Valerijan Pribićević (1940–1947)

=== Bishops of Srem ===
- Vikentije Prodanov (administrator) (1947–1951)
- Nikanor Iličić (1951–1955)
- Makarije Đorđević (1955–1978)
- Andrej Frušić (1980–1986)
- Vasilije Vadić (1986–present)

== Notable monasteries ==
- Krušedol
- Staro Hopovo
- Novo Hopovo
- Šišatovac
- Vrdnik-Ravanica
- Grgeteg
- Velika Remeta
- Jazak
- Fenek
- Beočin
- Bešenovo
- Divša
- Kuveždin
- Mala Remeta
- Privina Glava
- Petkovica
- Rakovac

== Gallery ==
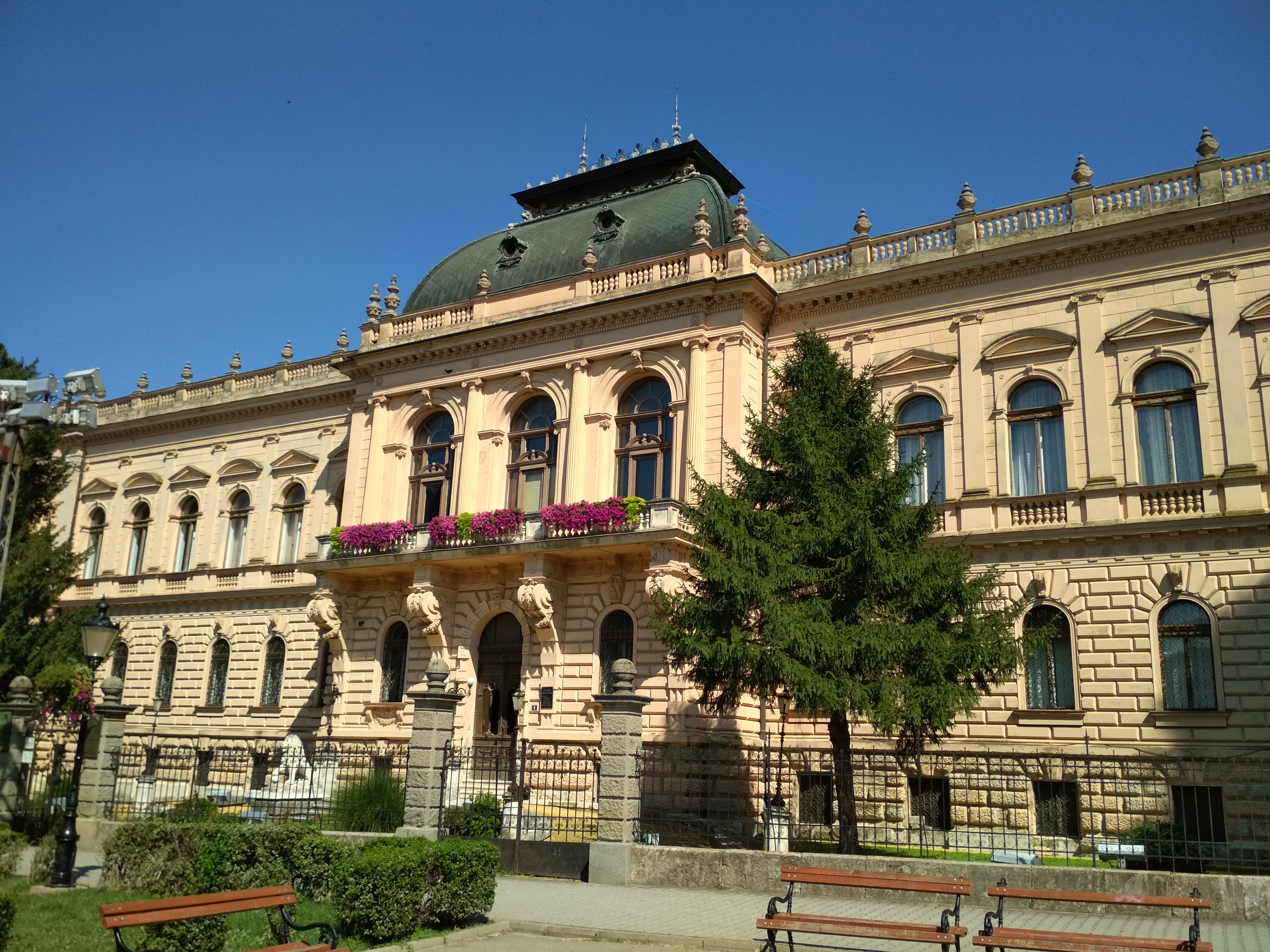
Palace of the Patriarchate

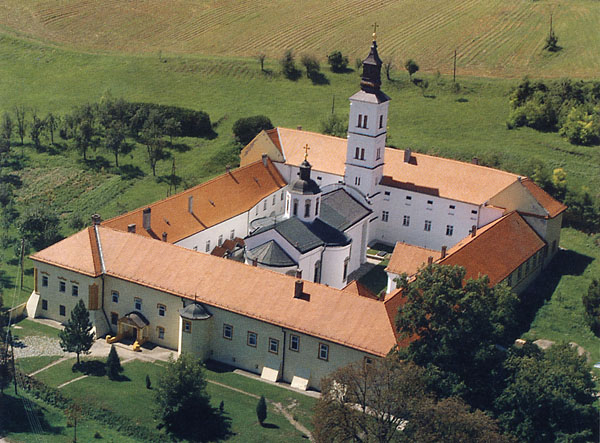
Krušedol Monastery

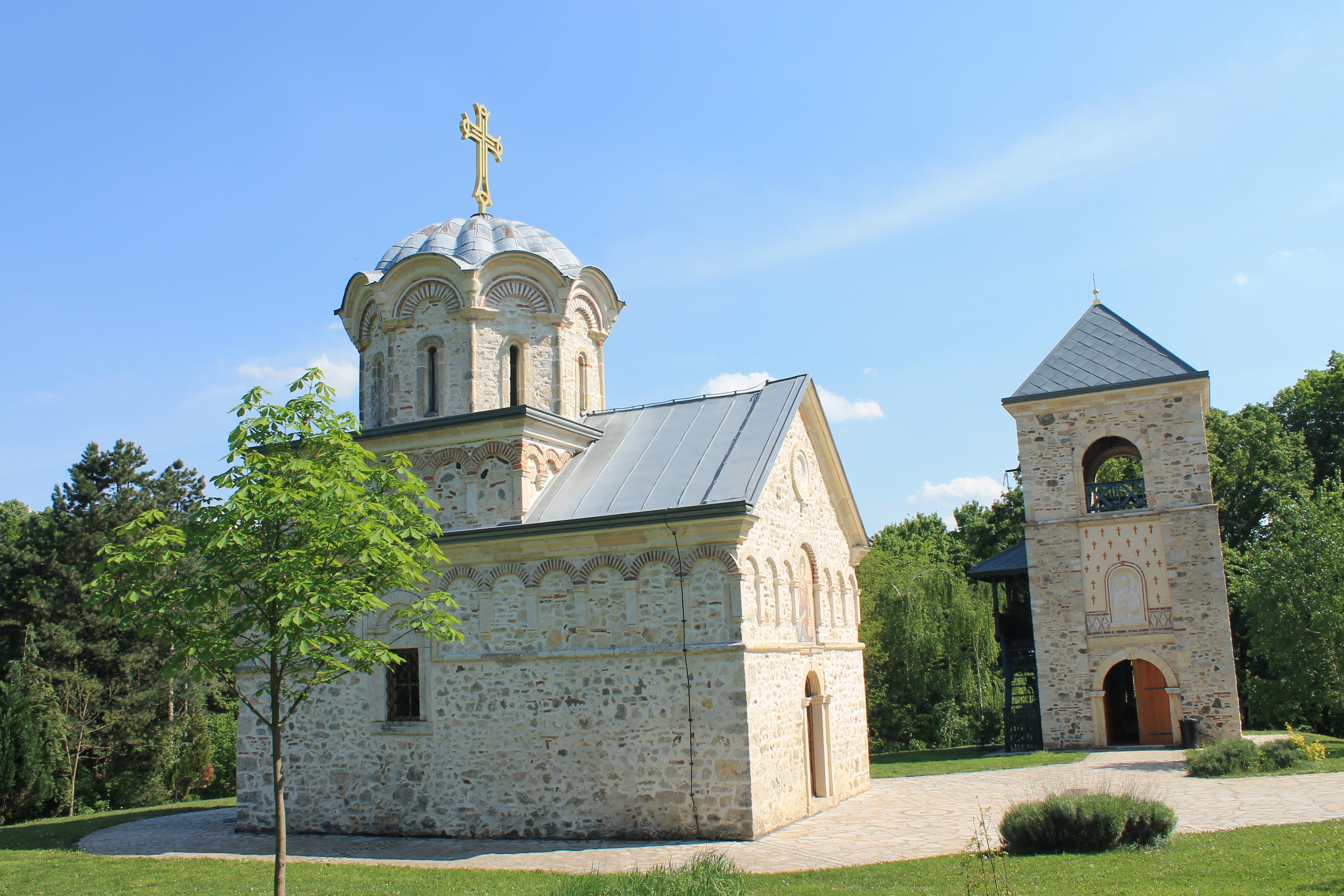
Staro Hopovo Monastery

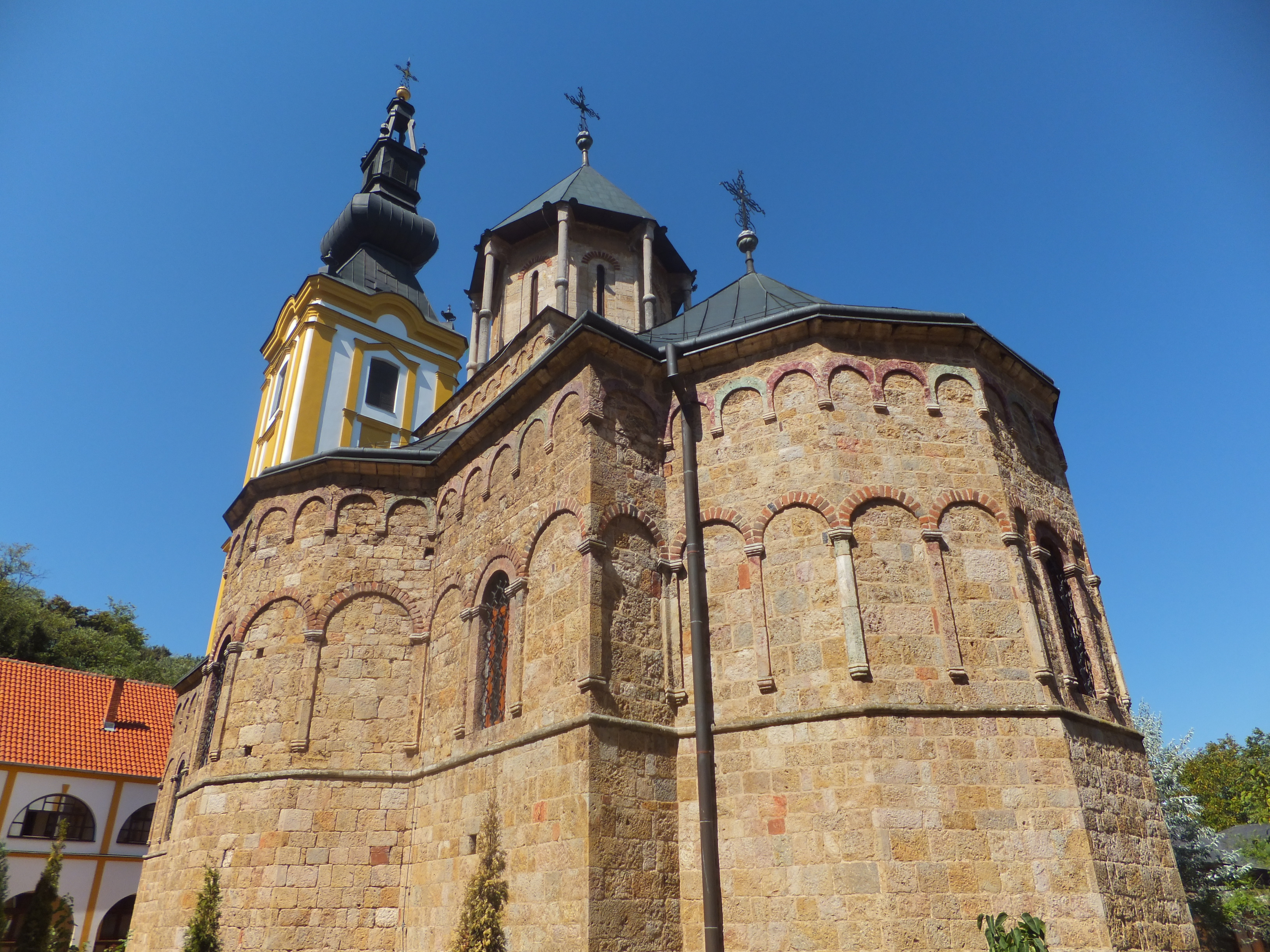
Privina Glava Monastery

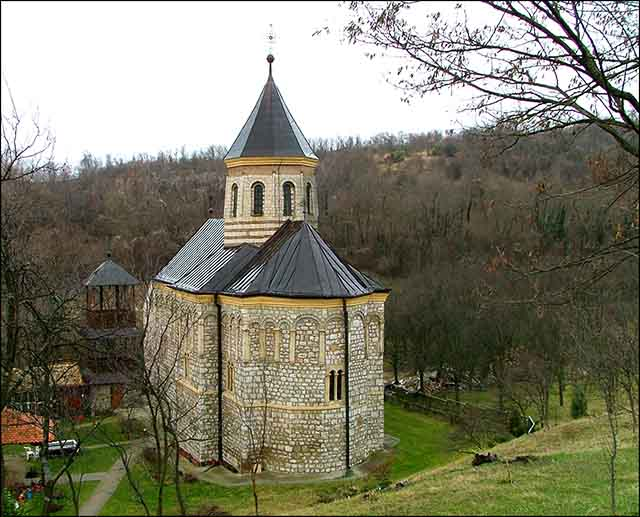
Mala Remeta Monastery

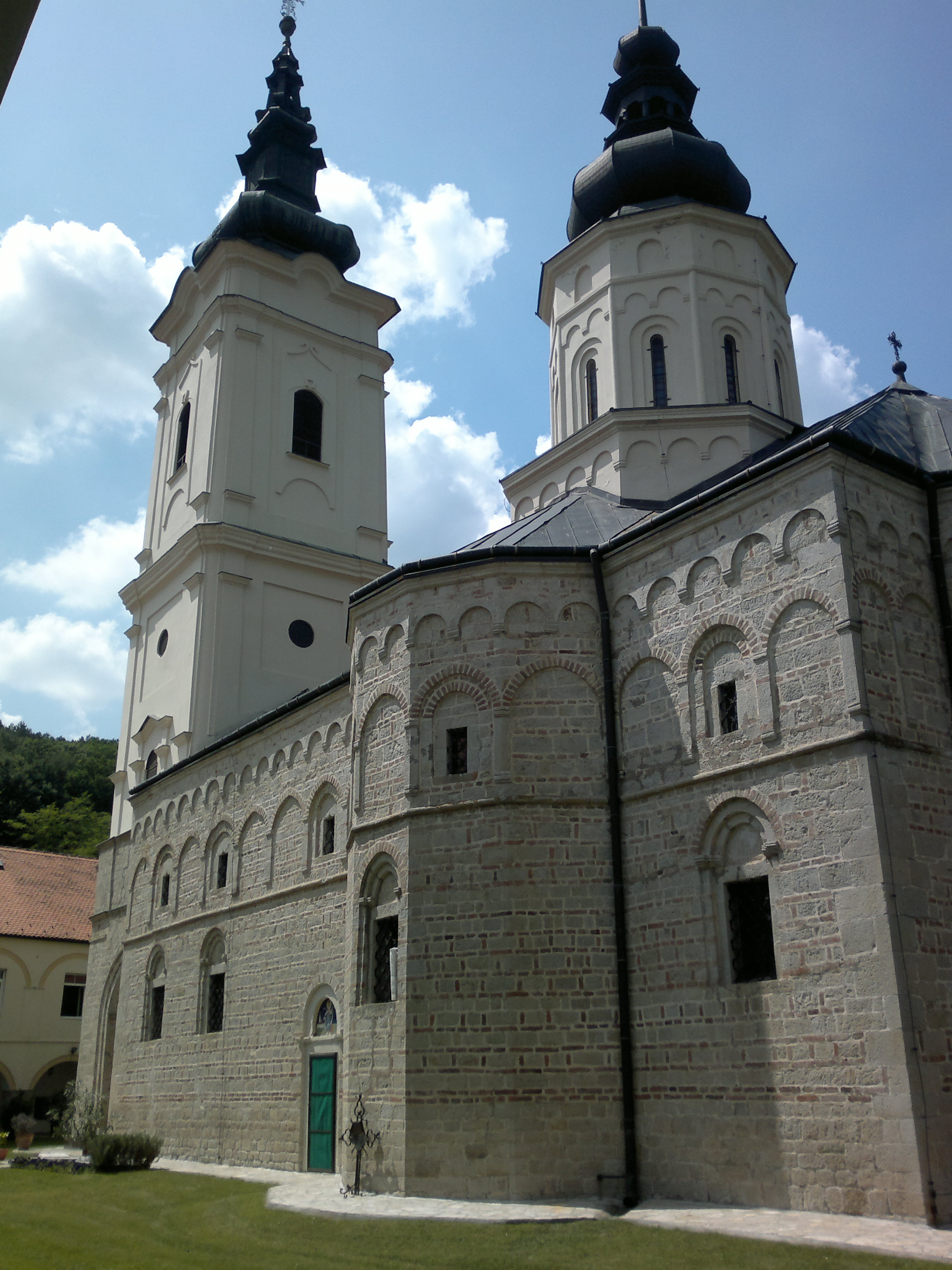
Jazak Monastery

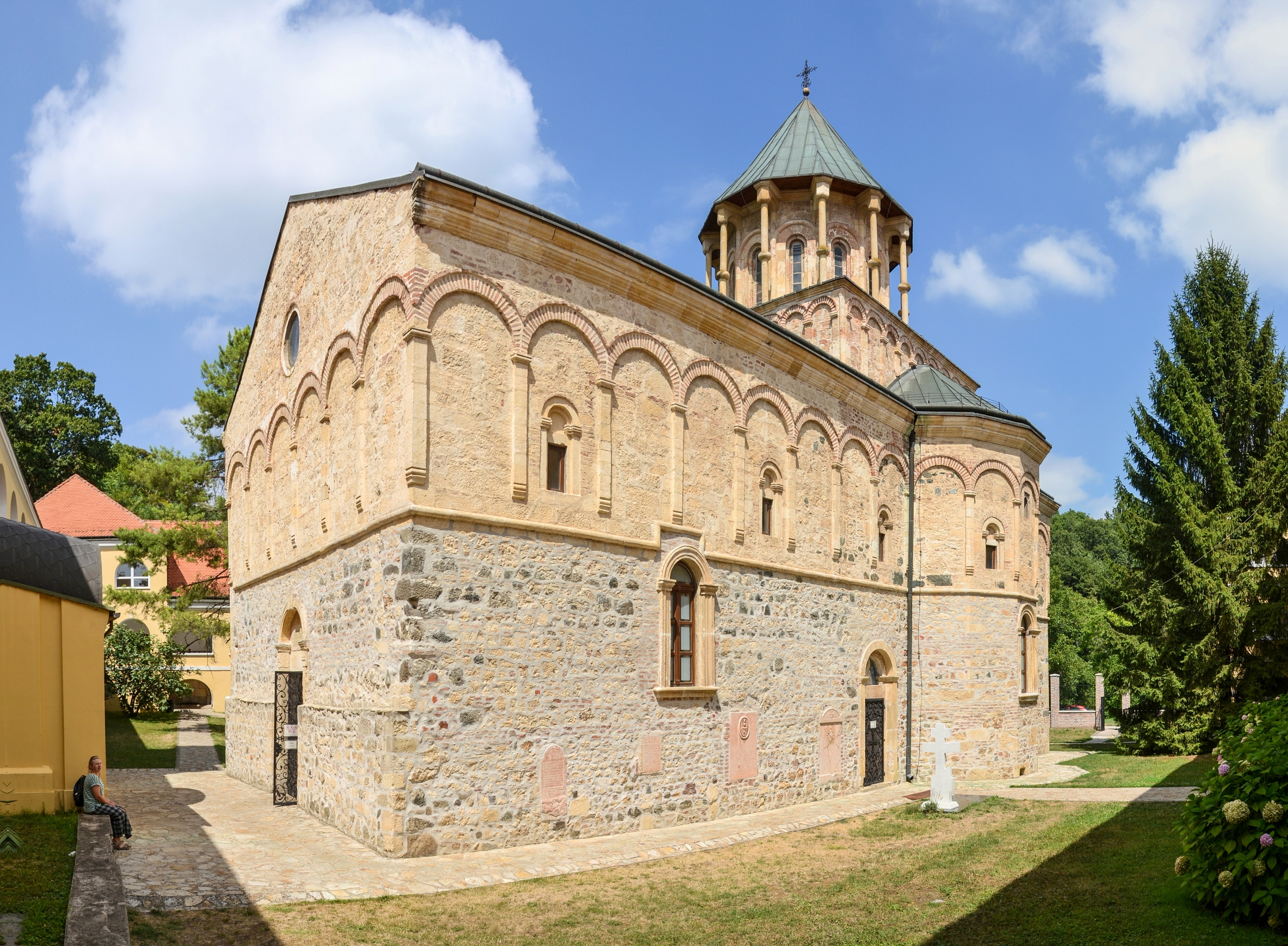
Novo Hopovo Monastery

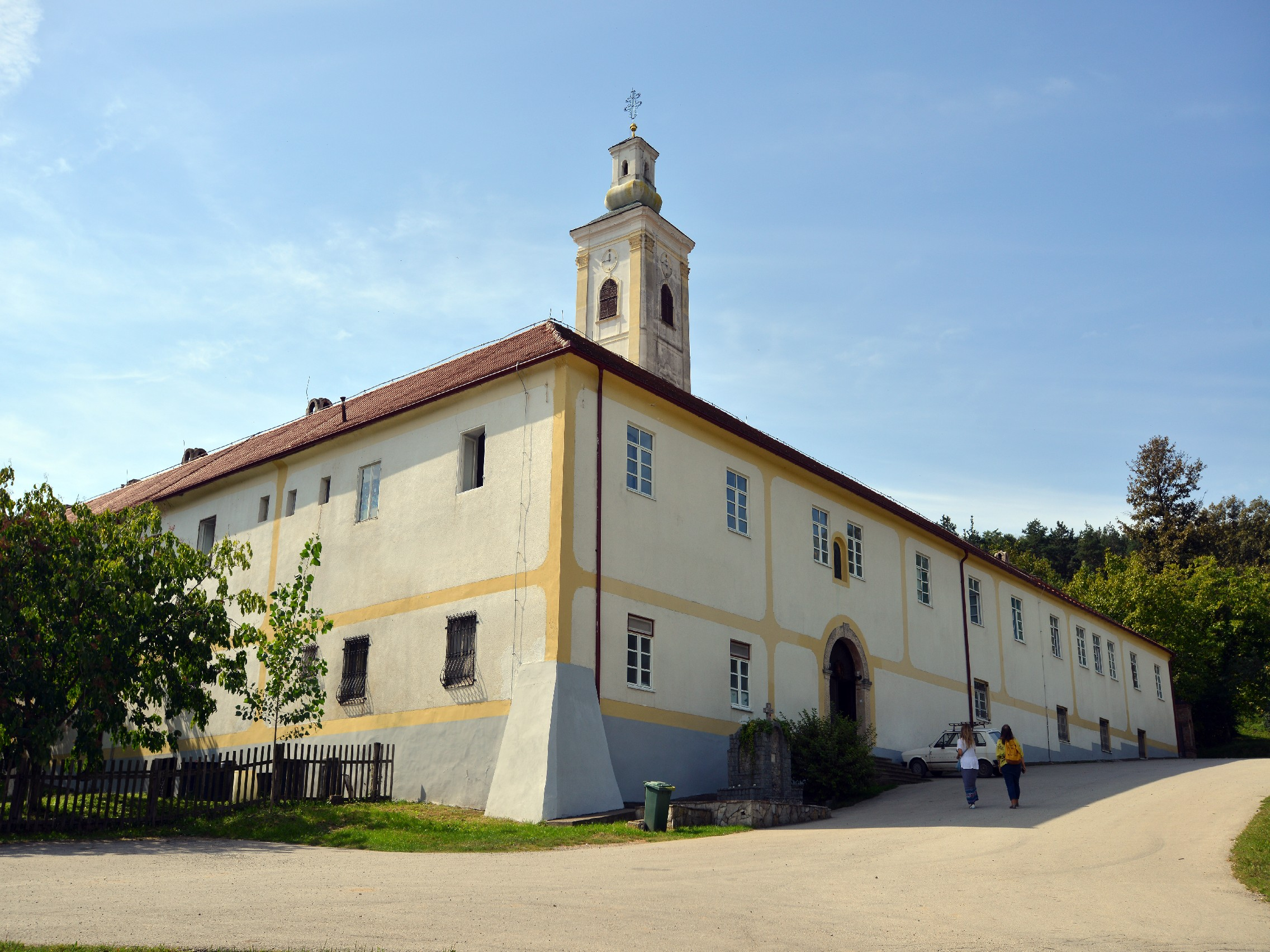
Velika Remeta Monastery

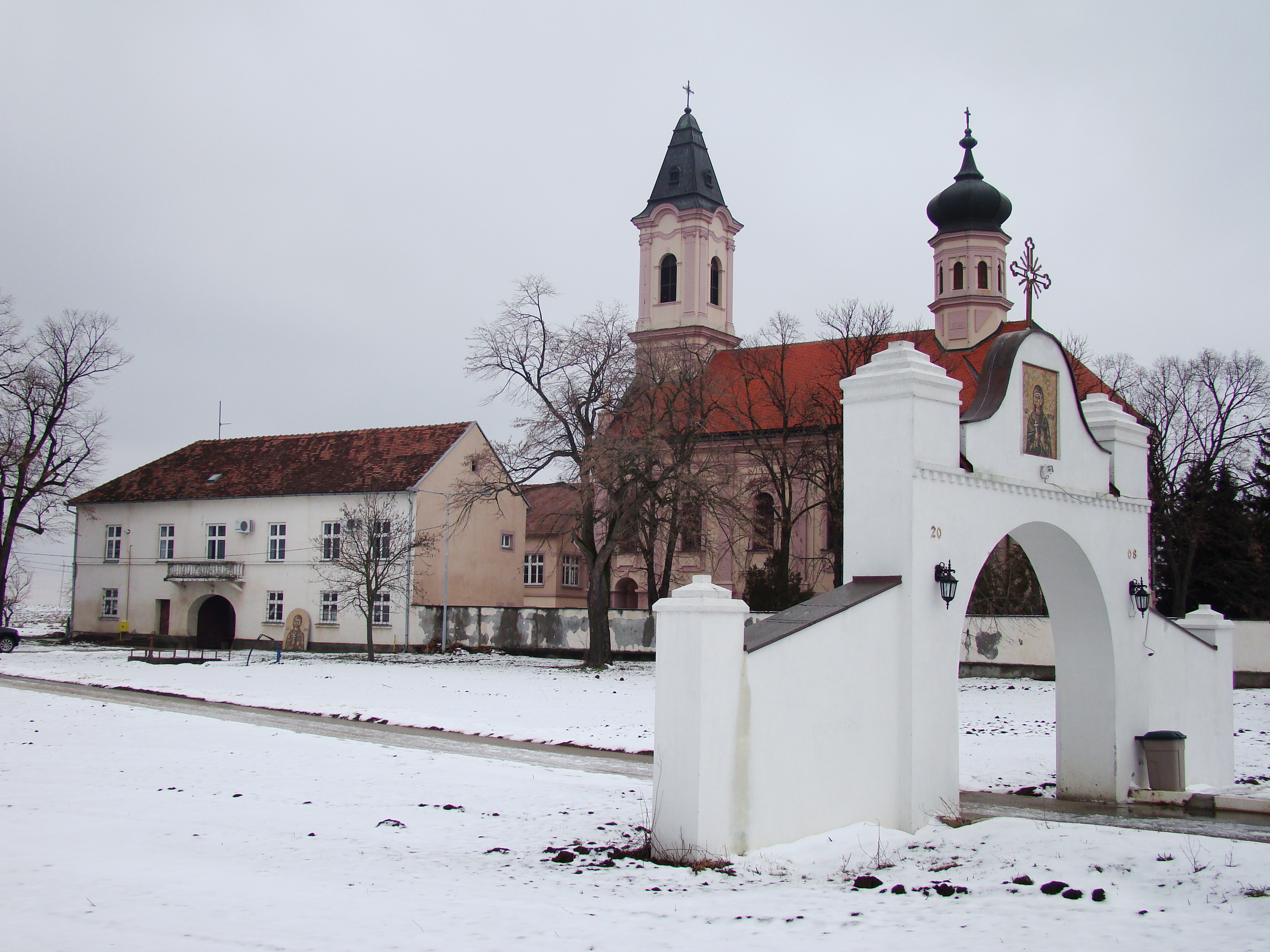
Fenek Monastery

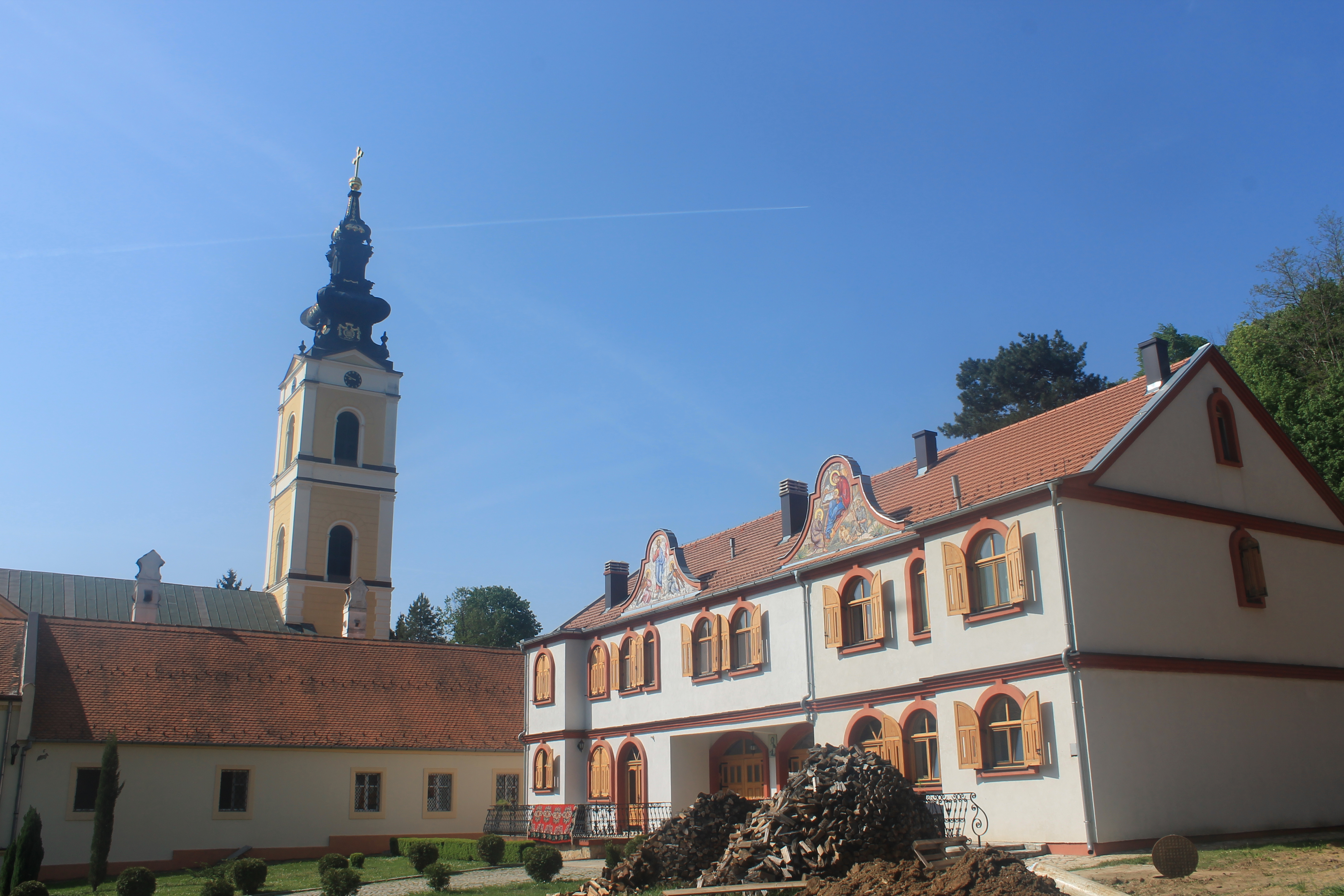
Grgeteg Monastery

== See also ==
- Eparchies and metropolitanates of the Serbian Orthodox Church
- Saint Arsenije Serbian Orthodox Seminary

== Sources ==
- Božanić, Snežana (2015). "The Political and Cultural Life of Despot Đorđe Branković in Syrmia". The Cultural and Historical Heritage of Vojvodina in the Context of Classical and Medieval Studies. Novi Sad: Faculty of Philosophy. pp. 191–203.
- Ćirković, Sima (2004). The Serbs. Malden: Blackwell Publishing. ISBN 9781405142915.
- Gavrilović, Slavko (1993). "Serbs in Hungary, Slavonia and Croatia in struggles against the Turks (15th–18th centuries)". Serbs in European Civilization. Belgrade: Nova, Serbian Academy of Sciences and Arts, Institute for Balkan Studies. pp. 41–54. ISBN 978-86-7583-015-3.
- Mirković, Miroslava (2017). Sirmium: Its History from the First Century AD to 582 AD. Novi Sad: Center for Historical Research.
- Mitrović, Katarina; Koprivica, Marija (2016). "Београдско-мачванска епископија између православља и католичанства (XI-XIV век)". Прилози за књижевност, језик, историју и фолклор. 82: 3–18.
- Sotirović, Vladislav B. (2011). "The Serbian Patriarchate of Peć in the Ottoman Empire: The First Phase (1557–94)" (PDF). Serbian Studies. 25 (2): 143–169. doi:10.1353/ser.2011.0038. Archived from the original (PDF) on 10 August 2016.
- Točanac-Radović, Isidora (2018). "Belgrade - Seat of the Archbishopric and Metropolitanate (1718–1739)". Belgrade 1521-1867. Belgrade: The Institute of History. pp. 155–167. ISBN 978-86-7743-132-7.
- Vuković, Sava (1996). Српски јерарси од деветог до двадесетог века (Serbian Hierarchs from the 9th to the 20th Century). Евро, Унирекс, Каленић.
