= Church of the Holy Archangels Michael and Gabriel, Batajnica =

Serbian Orthodox church in Belgrade, Serbia

Church of the Holy Archangels Michael and Gabriel
- Црква светих арханђела Михаила и Гаврила
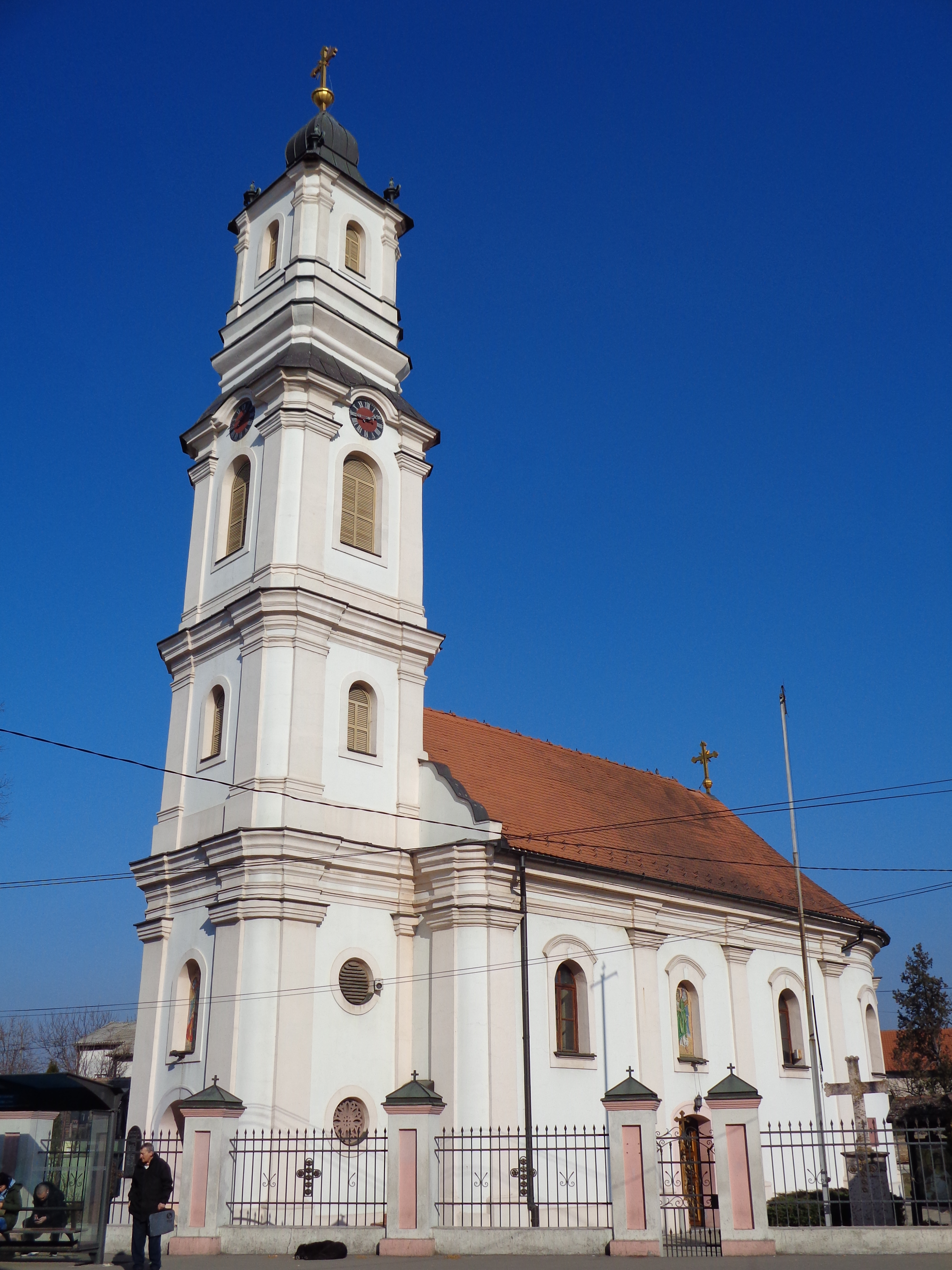
- Church of the Holy Archangels Michael and Gabriel
- Church of the Holy Archangels Michael and Gabriel
- 44°54′23″N 20°16′29″E
- Location: Batajnica, Belgrade

Cultural Heritage of Serbia
- Type: Cultural Monument of Great Importance
- Designated: 30 December 1997
- Reference no.: СК 426
- Country: Serbia
- Denomination: Serbian Orthodox

History
- Dedication: Archangel Michael and Gabriel
- Consecrated: 1785

Architecture
- Style: Baroque and Classicism

Administration
- Archdiocese: Eparchy of Srem

The Church of the Holy Archangels Michael and Gabriel (Serbian Cyrillic: Црква светих арханђела Михаила и Гаврила) in Batajnica is a Serbian Orthodox church in wider Belgrade, capital of Serbia. Built between 1780 and 1785, it is listed among the protected cultural monuments of the Republic of Serbia and on the list of cultural heritage of the City of Belgrade. It consists of a single nave, with a semi-circular apse and a narthex topped by a three-story Baroque bell tower.

The building houses several valuable art objects. The iconostasis includes 44 icons created by Teodor Kračun, one of the most important Serbian Baroque painters of the 18th century. There are also 28 icons by Živko Petrović, a 19th-century painter from Zemun, as well as religious objects from the 18th and 19th centuries, rare books, and archival documents.

== See also ==
- Eparchy of Srem
