= Bermet =

Dessert wine from Fruška Gora, Serbia

Bermet Бермет
- Type: Dessert wine
- Origin: Serbia, Fruška Gora
- Alcohol by volume: 16–18%

Бермет (Bermet)

Bermet (Serbian Cyrillic: Бермет) is a dessert wine that is a specialty of northern Serbia's Fruška Gora wine region, in the Vojvodina province. It was originally intended for medicinal purposes (similar to the original digestifs), but later it was produced for regular consumption.

It contains between 16 and 18% of alcohol and it is usually served as a dessert wine, but can also be served as an aperitif, much like Vermouth. However, Bermet is produced in a different manner than Vermouth, through maceration of 20 different herbs and spices. It can be made of red or white grapes, but the exact recipe is secret and held by only a handful of families in the town of Sremski Karlovci.

According to some documents, Bermet was served on the Titanic, as well as in the Vienna royal palace.

It is best served at a temperature of 18-20 C. Bermet is registered as a protected indication of geographical origin in the Intellectual Property Office of the Republic of Serbia.
