= Fruška Gora =

Mountain range and geographical subregion of Syrmia

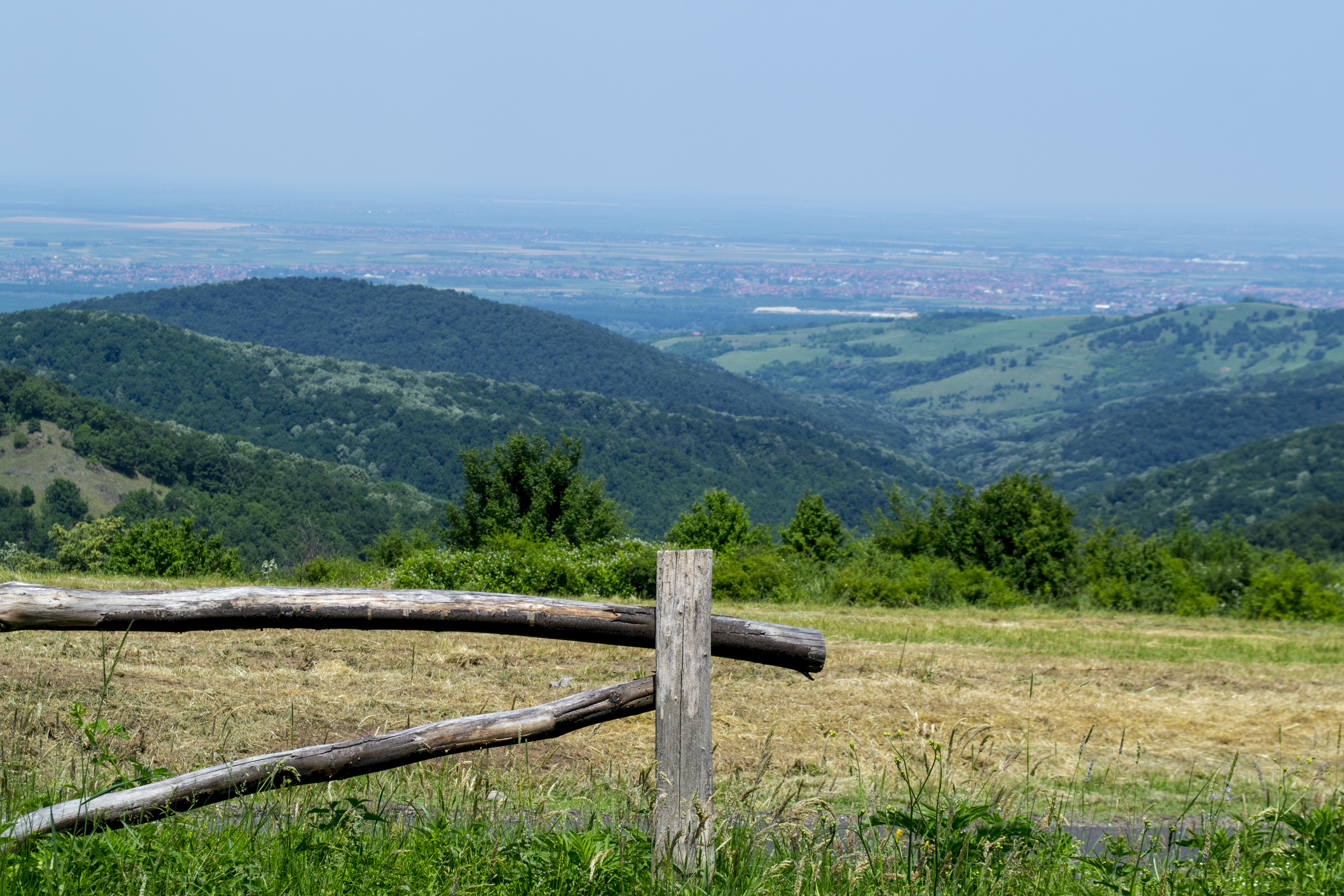

Highest point
- Elevation: 539 m (1,768 ft)
- Coordinates: 45°09′04″N 19°42′40″E

Naming
- Nickname: Serbian Mount Athos

Geography
- Location within Serbia Location within Croatia
- Location: Syrmia
- Parent range: Pannonian island mountains

Geology
- Mountain type: Island mountain
- IUCN category II (national park)
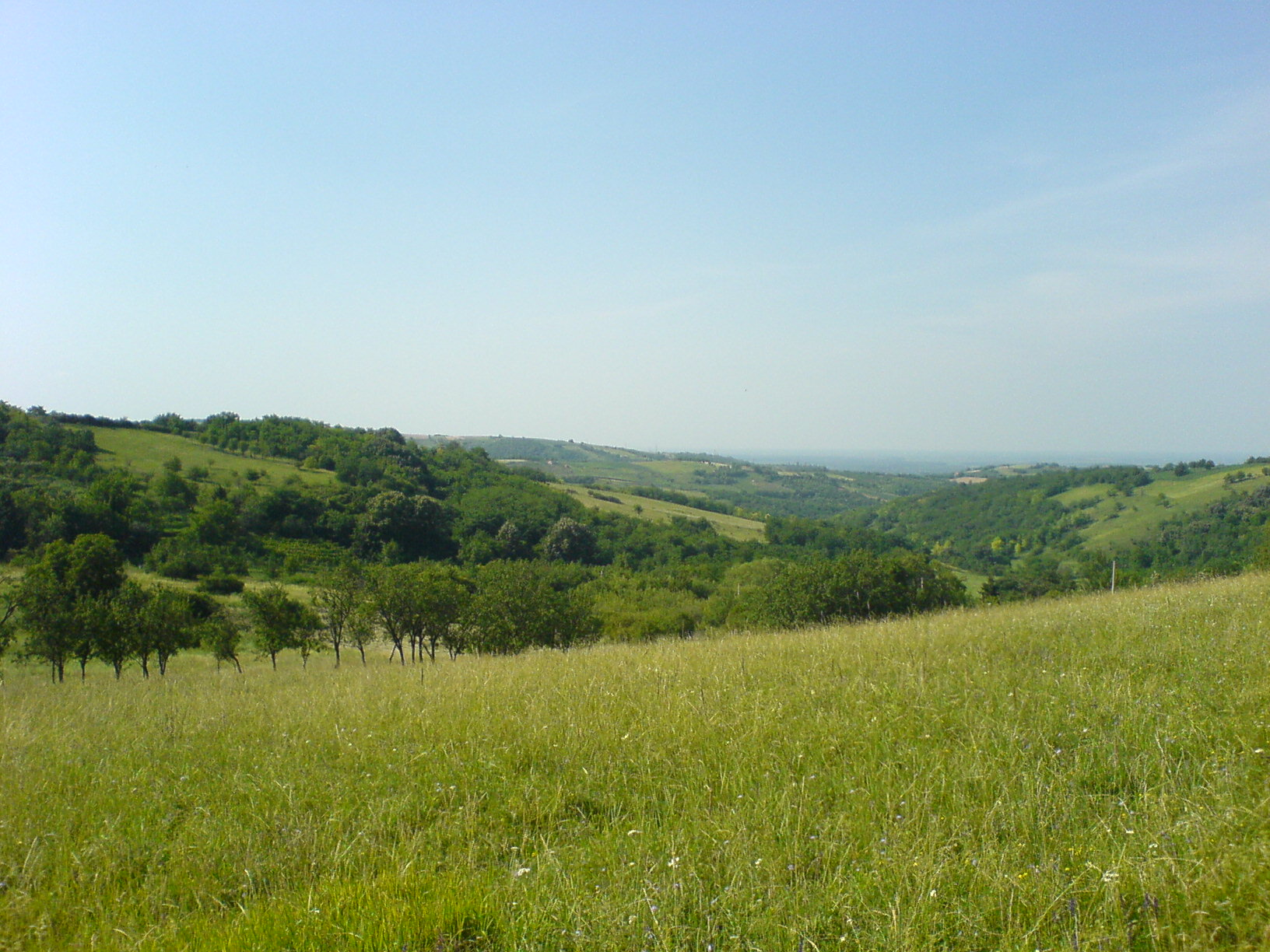
- Fruška Gora National Park
- Area: 266.72 km^{2} (102.98 sq mi)
- Established: 1960

Fruška Gora (Serbian Cyrillic: Фрушка гора) is a low mountain in Syrmia, most of it being part of Serbia and its westernmost edge extending into eastern Croatia. The Serbian part of the mountain forms the country's oldest national park. Sometimes also referred to as the Serbian Mount Athos, being the home of a large number of historical Serbian Orthodox monasteries.

== Etymology ==
In Serbian, it is known as Fruška gora (pronounced [frûʃkaː ɡǒra], Фрушка гора) originatong in the old Serbian word "Fruzi" derived from the singular form "Frug"; and its adjective is Fruški, used for naming the Frankish people. The name of "Fruška Gora" is "Frankish mountain" in English whose meaning is based on describing a historical event. The mountain served as a natural border when Frankish campaigns were set up in the area. In the time of the Roman Empire, its name was Alma Mons, meaning the "fertile mount". It is recorded that during the reign of emperor Marcus Aurelius Probus, 276–282, who was born in the nearby Sirmium, the first grapevines on the mountain were planted.

== History ==
There are traces of human habitation in this area that date from Neolithic times. Before the Roman conquest, Illyrians and Celts inhabited this region. In 31 AD, this area was conquered by the Romans and was included into Pannonia province. The Danube river was a border of the Roman Empire (limes), and on the northern side of the mountain several Roman border fortresses were built.

In the Early Middle Ages, this area was settled by Quadi, Huns, Goths, Gepids, Slavs and Avars. The Franks expelled Huns, Avars, Gepids and Lombards from this area and formed the southern border of the Frankish Empire, ultimately giving its name to the mountain.

It was later inhabited by Bulgarians, Pechenegs and Hungarians. In the 11th century, when Christianity was split between Catholicism and Orthodoxy, both communities had their churches in this region. A very important group of Serb medieval monasteries was formed on the mountain.

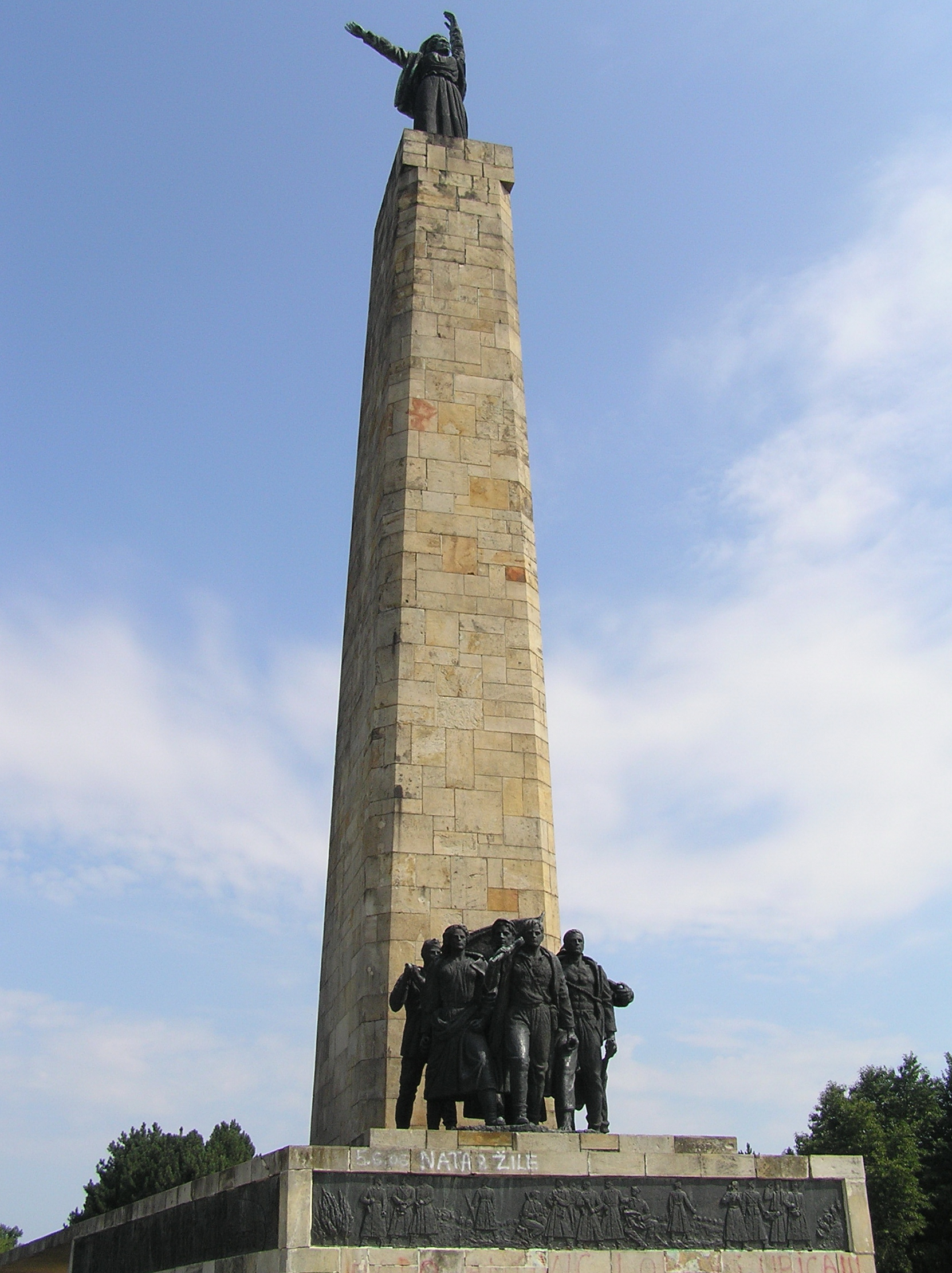
The Freedom Monument, dedicated to the anti-fascist resistance during the World War II

Since the 19th century, during the Austro-Hungarian period, cities developed so as the trade and crafts. Settlements on the mountain itself developed, designed in the typical folk tradition. Two most distinct settlements, in terms of architectural inheritance, are Sremski Karlovci, which grew into the center of the political and cultural life of the Serbs in Austria and, later, Austria-Hungary, and Irig, one of the most developed Syrmian settlements since the 18th century.

Over the time, the area was part of the Hun Empire, the Ostrogothic Kingdom, the Gepid Kingdom, the Lombard state, the Byzantine Empire, the Avar Khaganate, the Frankish Empire, the Bulgarian Empire, Lower Pannonia, the Kingdom of Hungary, the Ottoman Empire, the Habsburg monarchy, the Austrian Empire, Austria-Hungary, the State of Slovenes, Croats and Serbs, the Kingdom of Serbia, the Kingdom of Serbs, Croats and Slovenes, the Kingdom of Yugoslavia, Socialist Federal Republic of Yugoslavia, Serbia and Montenegro, and now is within the Republic of Serbia.

During World War II, this area was occupied by the Axis powers, and Fruška Gora was an important center of Partisan resistance movement. A liberated partisan territory was formed in this region.

In 2003, police revealed that former Serbian president Ivan Stambolić had been assassinated by eight men on the mountain. At the time Slobodan Milošević was still in power. It was later determined that Milošević had given the order for Stambolić's murder.

== Geography ==
The mountain is a natural geological phenomenon as it is built from rocks from almost all geological periods. It used to be an island during the existence of the Pannonian Sea. To the north, the mountain is bordered by the Danube river, while to the south it descends into the Syrmian lowlands. It is stretching approximately 80 km (50 mi) from east to west and 15 km (9.3 mi) from north to south. Its highest peak is Crveni Čot at 539 m (1,768 ft).

== National park ==
The national park of Fruška Gora was declared in 1960 and covers an area of 266.72 km^{2} (102.98 sq mi). It is the oldest modern national park in Serbia.

=== Plant life ===
Rich fossil fauna is preserved and almost 90% of the park area is forested. The predominant tree species include linden, oak and beech. The concentration of linden forests is highest in Europe. In time, linden became the dominant tree species, replacing formerly much larger and dominant oak forests, which are considered to be the autochthonous vegetation on Fruška Gora. Altogether, 1,500 plant species inhabits the park, of which 200 are protected. There are also 400 species of fungi. Pannonian plant endemites include Tatar dock (Crambe tataria), broadleaf wild leek and Hungarian leopard's-bane. There are some 30 species of orchids in the park.

In 2016, massive cutting of trees in the park occurred, one of the largest in the mountain's recorded history. Over 10 ha (25 acres) of forest have been cut. Park administration then stated that an autochthonous species of oak will be planted instead. However, they never planted anything and in the future years a thicket of the remaining black locust high shrubs grew instead. The administration, nevertheless, claims that the oaks have been planted. In the spring of 2019, aggressive cutting continued. Apparently indiscriminate cutting, without proper notifications what is being cut and by whom, destroyed hiking paths and orienteering marks. Also, the cutting sections of the forest weren't properly secured and some were completely wrong: beech trees have been cut even though the table stated that oak trees are being cut. According to the environmentalists, regular visitors and recreational athletes, the cutting was never so massive.

Timber was transported outside of the park and was sold by the park administration. They responded that everything is being part of the planned action, that park has to think about the "economic part" of its existence (as the government is allocating small amounts of money to the park) and that trees will be "replenished later" because the cut ones were old. Members of the commission which participated in the planning said that even more trees should have been cut as 80% of the forest is over 80 years old. Only 3% of park's territory is under the strict protection (some 800 ha (2,000 acres) of forest at Papratski Dol locality). The trees have been cut right along the border of this area, clearing the land which surrounds it. Citizens responded that national park is not a tree farm where the trees should be "replaced" and that protected forests can't be perceived as a feedstock. Director of the park said that he doesn't know how much trees they cut and planted, but numbers officially published by the park in 2018 show that in an undefined period they planted 50,000 seedlings, but 100,000 trees have been cut. Also, the park's plan for 2019 envisioned almost 100 time more money for cutting the trees than for the planting of the new ones. In 2020, 60,000 new trees were planned to be planted in the park, to commemorate 60th anniversary of the national park establishment.

Map

By the 2010s, the predominant cultivated plant on the foothills of the mountain and the surrounding vast fields, became the rapeseed. In March 2020 it was announced that saffron was discovered on the mountain. There are some 20 species of saffron living in Serbia, but they never populated Fruška Gora. The discovered species is woodland crocus, it was found on only one location, but already spread to several thousand individual plants.

With several other beech localities in the national parks of Tara and Kopaonik, beech forests Papratski Do and Ravne on Fruška Gora have been submitted for the inclusion into the UNESCO World Heritage Site Ancient and Primeval Beech Forests of the Carpathians and Other Regions of Europe in May 2020. The nomination was rejected due to the Serbian laws allowing shelterwood cutting on the area of 5 hectares (12 acres), while UNESCO accepts cut areas no larger than 1 hectare (2.5 acres), and even that is not only in the areas of the highest level of protection, but also in the surrounding zones. It was announced that the rules will be changed, so that parts of Fruška Gora might be included in 2023.

=== Animal life ===
Protected insect species include Balkan goldenring, certain species of dragonflies and hoverflies, and Hungarian ground beetle, which already went extinct in some other European countries. Park is also the habitat of 13 amphibian species and 11 reptilians, of which 14 are protected, among them fire salamander and European adder.

Park is home to 211 bird species. Symbol of Fruška Gora is eastern imperial eagle, today with only 2 or 3 remaining breeding couples. There are 60 mammalian species, of which 17 are protected, including edible dormouse, European pine marten, European polecat and Mediterranean water shrew. Out of 30 species of bats which live in Serbia, 15 inhabits the mountain and all are under strict protection.

In January 2018, for the first time after the 1960s, additional mouflons were introduced in the park. 30 animals were relocated from Slovakia, which raised the number of mouflons in the park to 70. European fallow deer was also reintroduced. On 29 March 2022, five European bisons were reintroduced in the previously prepared habitat on the mountain. One bull and four cows were transported from the zoo in the Czech Republic and Poland's Białowieża Forest reserve, respectively. It is estimated that the last bison on Serbian territory was hunted in c.1800. The male, who was named Đuka by popular vote, got ill but the therapy didn't help, and he died on 12 October 2023. The post-mortem showed several inflammatory diseases and a major trauma on Djuka's rib cage. Foul play was excluded, and it was suggested the trauma was caused by another animal or by the fall of the tree during the severe storm in July.

== Archaeology ==
Edreš Hill was used as a quarry by prehistoric people for their tools. There are numerous Roman remains, like the fortress Acumincum near Slankamen and Bassianae, a Roman town near Donji Petrovci. The town was fortified with the ramparts and square towers. Within the walls, the objects with the heating and sewage systems were discovered, so as the walls painted with frescoes and floor mosaics. In 1952, in the locality of Bikić Do, a Roman vault was discovered with 11,500 coins, including ones from the reign of Constantine the Great.

Attractions from the later period include the Tower of Vrdnik, the only remaining part of the medieval fortress, the Rivica Watermill and Stražilovo, where the remains of the poet Branko Radičević were reinterred from Vienna in 1883.

== Viticulture ==
Fruška Gora also divides Syrmia in two geographically distinct parts: Wine Syrmia (upper or mountainous) and Swine Syrmia (lower or lowland). Slopes of the mountain were established as one of the most prestigious vineyards in Hungary, ever since the 15th century. Golden age of the Fruška Gora's viticulture began after 1699 and the Treaty of Karlowitz, when Ottomans were expelled from the area, until the late 19th century.

In Sremski Karlovci, a famous dessert wine called bermet is produced, with protected geographical indication. It is recorded that the crates of bermet were used as a bribe by the Serbs to obtain certain privileges from the Austrian empress Maria Theresa. The wine was served at the Russian and British courts, and was on the wine list of Titanic.

The slopes of Fruška Gora are perfectly suited for grape arbors, and wine-makers producing Traminer, Riesling and other wines in the region. After the fall of communism, the Serbian Orthodox Church got 10,000 hectares restitution in the area of their nationalized properties.

== Monasteries ==
There are over a dozen Serbian Orthodox monasteries located on Fruška Gora. In the eighteenth century the monasteries became the home of monks from Rača monastery in the Bajina Bašta municipality by the Drina River. These monks were writers famous for their illuminated manuscripts.

The Fruška Gora Monasteries were declared Monuments of Culture of Exceptional Importance in 1990, and are protected by the state.

Ottoman documents mention 35 monasteries, of which 16 survived and are still active today. Due to such a large number of monasteries on one place, Fruška Gora is colloquially called Serbian Mount Athos. The Holy Synod of the Serbian Orthodox Church officially declared Fruška Gora a Holy Mountain on 12 October 2003.

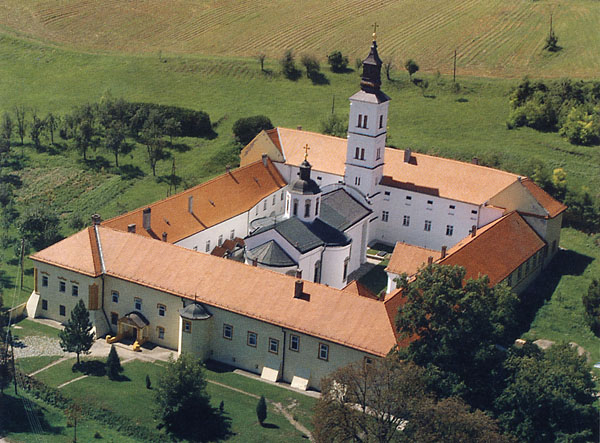
Krušedol Monastery

List of monasteries:

- Beočin – The time of founding is still unknown. It is first mentioned in Turkish records dated in 1566/1567.
- Bešenovo – According to the legend, the Bešenovo monastery was founded by Serbian King Dragutin at the end of the 13th century. The earliest historical records about the monastery that can be found date from 1545.
- Divša – It is believed to have been founded by Despot Jovan Branković in the late 15th century. The earliest historical records about the monastery date to the second half of the 16th century.
- Grgeteg – According to tradition the monastery was founded by Zmaj Ognjeni Vuk (Despot Vuk Grgurević) in 1471. The earliest historical records about the monastery that can be found date to 1545/1546. Icons were painted by Uroš Predić.
- Jazak – The monastery was founded in 1736.
- Krušedol – The monastery was founded between 1509 and 1516, by Bishop Maksim (Despot Đorđe Branković) and his mother Angelina. Resting place of king Milan I of Serbia.
- Kuveždin – Traditionally, its foundation is ascribed to Stefan Štiljanović. The first reliable records of it are dated in 1566/1569.
- Mala Remeta – The foundation is traditionally ascribed to the Serbian King Dragutin. The earliest historical records relating to the monastery are dated to the middle of the 16th century.
- Novo Hopovo – According to tradition, the monastery was built by the Despots of the Branković dynasty. The first reliable mention of the monastery is dated to 1641. Dositej Obradović became a monk in this monastery.
- Privina Glava – According to the legends, Privina Glava was founded by a man named Priva, in the 12th century. The earliest historical records about the monastery are dated in 1566/1567.
- Petkovica – According to the tradition, it was founded by the widow of Stefan Štiljanović, Despotess Jelena. The earliest historical records mentioning the monastery are dated to 1566/1567.
- Rakovac – According to a legend written in 1704, Rakovac was founded by a certain man, Raka, courtier of Despot Jovan Branković. The legend states that Raka erected the monastery in 1498. The earliest historical records mentioning the monastery are dated to 1545/1546.
- Staro Hopovo – According to the tradition, the monastery was founded by Bishop Maksim (Despot Đorđe Branković). The first reliable mention of the monastery dates back to 1545/1546.
- Šišatovac – The foundation of the monastery is ascribed to the refugee monks from the Serbian monastery of Žiča. The reliable facts illustrating the life of the monastery date back from the mid 16th century.
- Velika Remeta – Traditionally, its founding is linked to King Dragutin at the end of the 13th century. The earliest historical records about the monastery date to 1562.
- Vrdnik-Ravanica – The exact date of its founding is unknown. The records indicate that the church was built at the time of Metropolitan Serafim Jovanović, in the second half of the 16th century. It holds the reliquary of Prince Lazar and his partial relics.

== Gallery ==
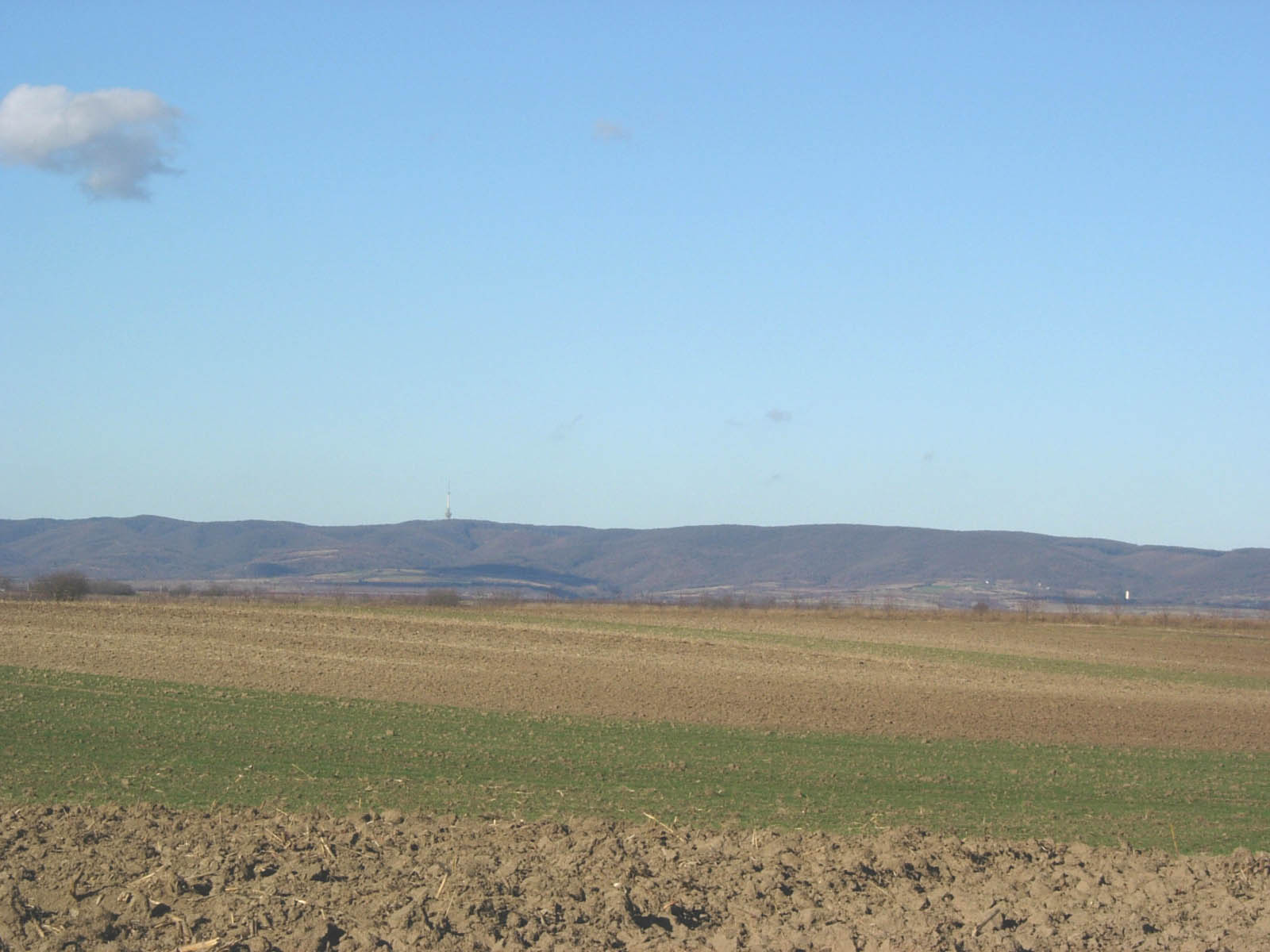
View from the south

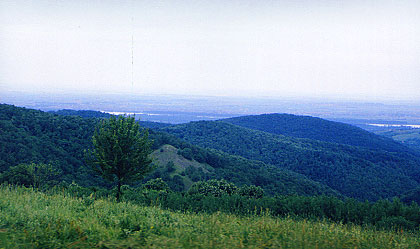

== See also ==
- List of mountains in Serbia
- Pannonian island mountains
- Fruškogorski maraton

== Sources ==
- Slobodan Ćurčić - Olivera Dobrivojević - Gordana Stojaković, Fruška gora: turistički vodič, Novi Sad - Beograd, 2002.
- Milorad Grujić, Vodič kroz Novi Sad i okolinu, Novi Sad, 2004.
- Gvozden Perković, Verski objekti na tlu Vojvodine, Novi Sad, 2006.

== Bibliography ==
- Poljak, Željko (February 1959). "Fruška gora". Kazalo za "Hrvatski planinar" i "Naše planine" 1898—1958 (PDF). Naše planine. Vol. XI. p. 7. ISSN 0354-0650.
