= Divša Monastery =

Monastery in Serbia

Coordinates: 45°10′04″N 19°29′02″E

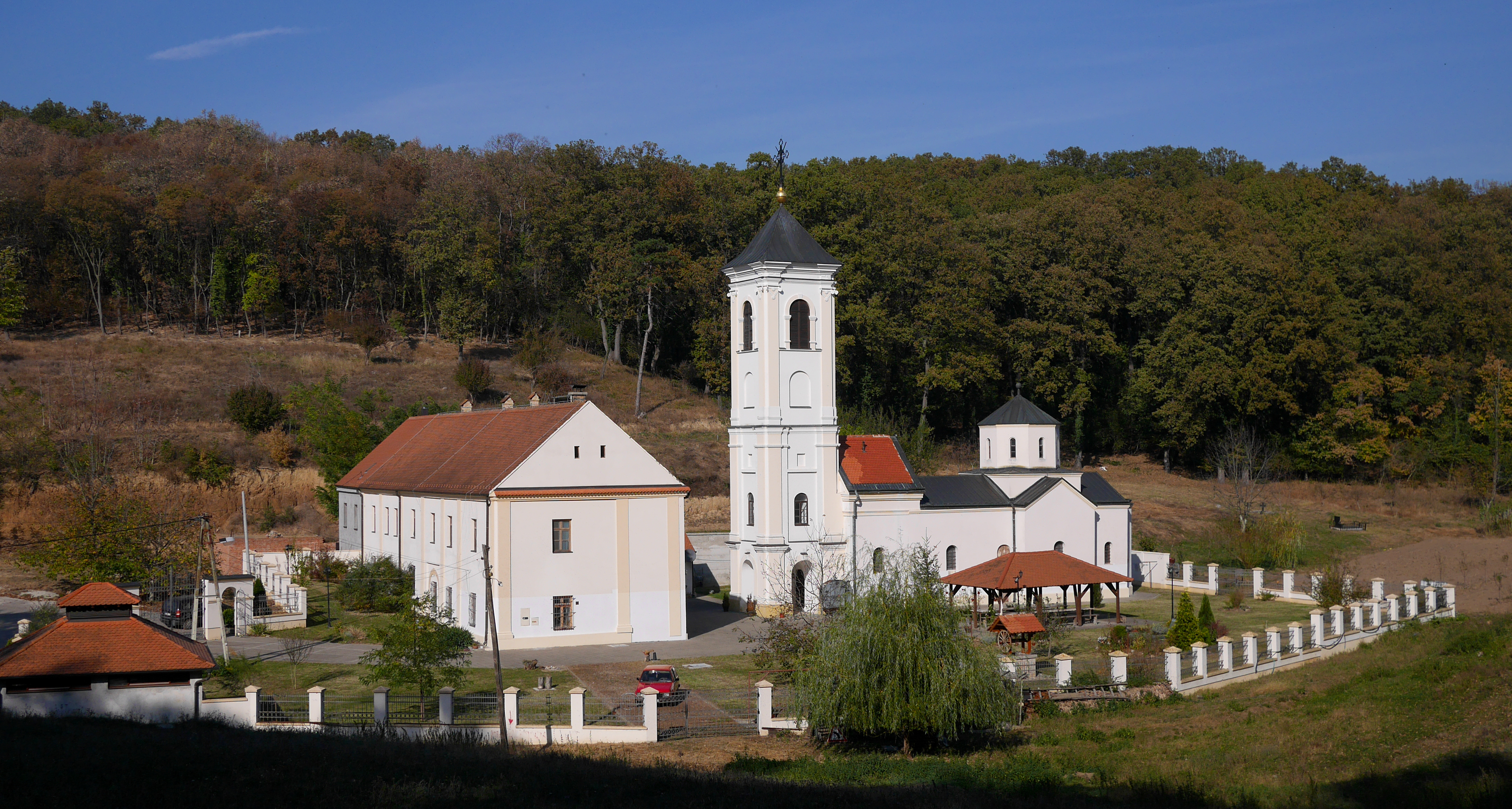
Divša monastery

The Divša Monastery (Serbian: Манастир Дивша, romanized: Manastir Divša), also known as Đipša (Ђипша), is a Serb Orthodox monastery on the Fruška Gora mountain in the northern Serbian province of Vojvodina. It is believed to have been founded by Despot Jovan Branković in the late 15th century. The earliest historical records about the monastery date to the second half of the 16th century. Owing to Turkish raids, the monastery was deserted in the 17th century; at the beginning of the 18th century, Dipša was mentioned as an appendage of the neighbouring Kuveždin monastery. Its old church underwent reconstruction in 1744, but the final alteration was made in 1762, when a new narthex was built. A chapel dedicated to the Mother of God was placed therein, upstairs. The iconostasis for the restored church was carried out by Teodor Stefanov Gologlavac in 1753.

Divša Monastery was declared a Monument of Culture of Exceptional Importance in 1990, and it is protected by the state.

== See also ==
- List of Serbian Orthodox monasteries
