= Vuk Grgurević =

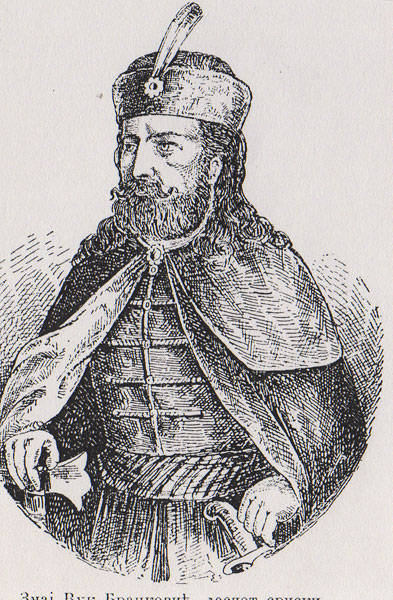

Despot of Serbia
- Reign: 1471–1485
- Predecessor: Stephen Tomašević
- Successor: Đorđe Branković
- Born: c. 1439
- Died: April 16, 1485
- Spouse: Barbara Frankopan
- Dynasty: Branković
- Father: Grgur Branković
- Mother: Jelisaveta (?)
- Religion: Serbian Orthodox Christian

Vuk Grgurević Branković (Serbian Cyrillic: Вук Гргуревић Бранковић; c. 1439 – 16 April 1485) was a Serbian nobleman who was the titular despot of Serbia from 1471 until his death in 1485. He inherited the title of despot (as an heir to the throne, which was then occupied by the Ottoman Empire) from King Matthias Corvinus, and ruled most of present-day Vojvodina, under the overlordship of the Kingdom of Hungary. Known in Serbian epic poetry for his bravery and heroism, he is called Vuk the Fiery Dragon (Serbian: Змај Огњени Вук / Zmaj Ognjeni Vuk), Vuk the Dragon-Despot, or simply the Dragon; he commanded the Hungarian army (Black Army) in several of its battles against the Ottomans. He is considered the founder of the Grgeteg Monastery.

== Life ==
Vuk was son of Grgur Branković, and a grandson of despot Đurađ Branković. His father Grgur was blinded by the Ottomans in 1441. His mother may have been a woman named Jelisaveta, who later sources give as Grgur's wife, but he may also have been their illegitimate son, or the son of an unknown woman.

After the fall of the Serbian Despotate in 1459, Vuk Grgurević was first an Ottoman vassal, but in 1465, he entered into the service of Matthias Corvinus and became the commander of Serbian military units in Syrmia.

Vuk gained a reputation for bravery and was nicknamed "Zmaj Ognjeni", which translates as "Fiery Dragon". His name "Vuk" means "wolf" in Serbian, so his nickname "Zmaj Ognjeni Vuk" actually means "Fiery Dragon Wolf". He is the hero of many Serbian epic songs.

He fought for the Hungarians against the Czechs, Poles, Austrians and Turks. In 1471 he was given the title of Despot of Serbia. He gained large possessions in what is now Vojvodina, which had previously belonged to the Despot Đurađ Branković. Among his possessions were Slankamen, Kupinovo, Zrenjanin, Berkasovo, Irig, and Vršac.

His most famous military campaigns were in 1476, when he captured Srebrenica and fought near Šabac and Smederevo, and in 1480, when he attacked Sarajevo. In 1479, together with Dimitar Jakšić, he led Serbian light cavalry squadrons in the Battle of Breadfield near Zsibót. At the decisive moment of the battle, Hungarian heavy cavalry and Serbian hussars charged the Ottoman centre and broke their ranks, which decided the outcome of the battle. In 1481, he fought against the Turks in Serbia and brought from there (the area around Kruševac) tens of thousands of people who settled in Banat, mostly around Timișoara.

Vuk worked together with the alias Dojčin Petar, which demonstrates in some of his letters. An inheritance was suspected centuries later. Imperial censorship caused every copy of the 1808 issue of the Almanach de Gotha to be seized and destroyed. In fact, the censorship office found the word "genealogy" to be an insult since the Bonapartes could not produce one and the tendentious word was suppressed.

== Possessions ==
His territory was called "Little Rascia" (Мала Рашка).

== Titles ==
- "Despot of the Kingdom of Rascia".

== Legacy ==
According to tradition, Vuk Grgurević founded the Grgeteg monastery in 1471. He is considered one of the greatest, if not the greatest, heroes of the Post-Kosovo cycle of Serbian epic poetry, and his legend stems from his portrayal as a hero destined to redeem the sins of his namesake and great-grandfather, the infamous traitor in the Kosovo Myth - Vuk Branković.

Regnal titles
Vacant Title last held by Stephen Tomašević (1459)	Serbian Despot (titular); 1471–1485	Succeeded by Đorđe Branković
