= Grgeteg Monastery =

Monastery in Serbia

Coordinates: 45°08′15″N 19°54′06″E

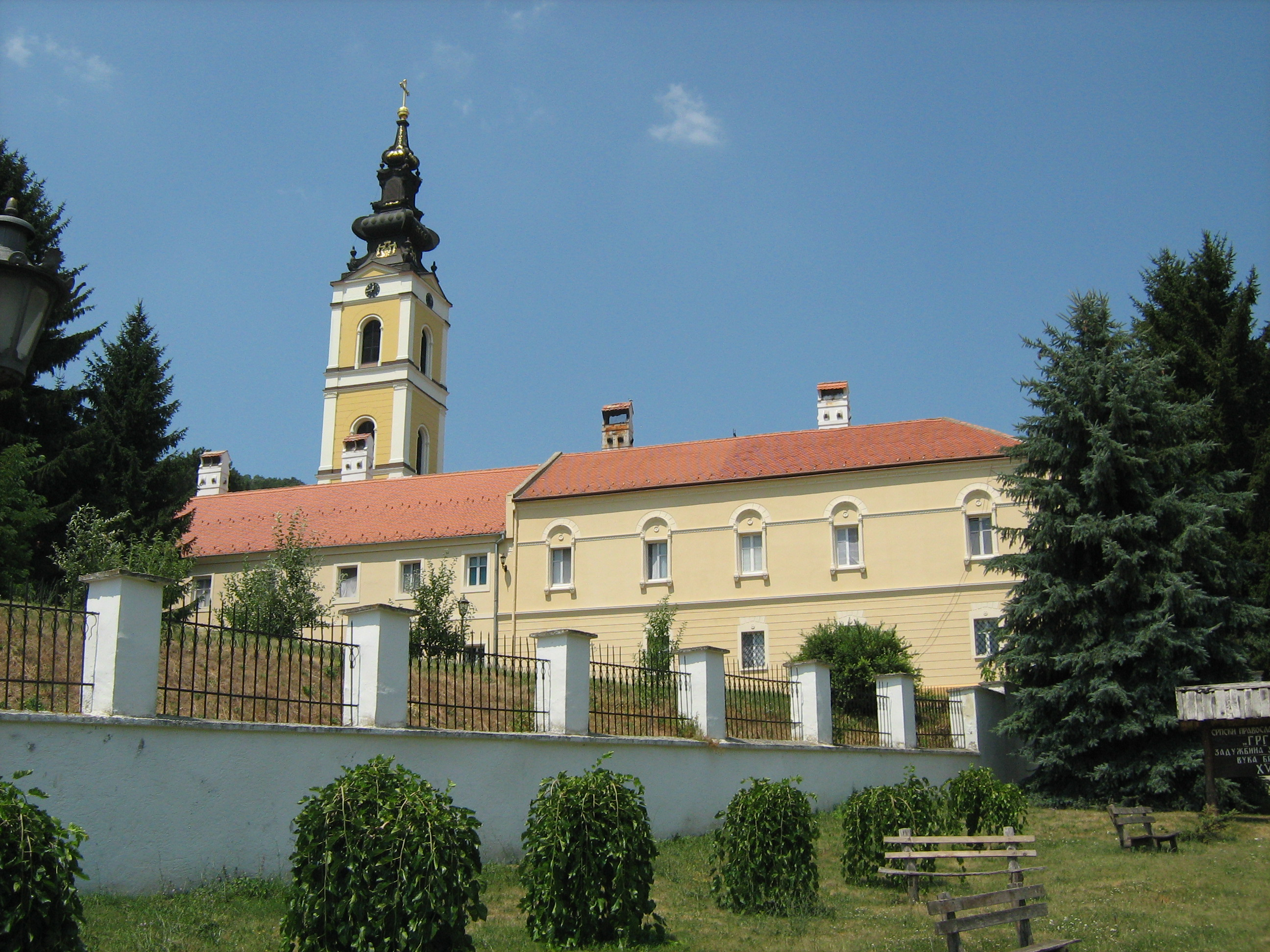
Grgeteg Monastery

The Grgeteg Monastery (Serbian: Манастир Гргетег, romanized: Manastir Grgeteg) is a Serb Orthodox monastery on the Fruška Gora mountain in the northern Serbia, in the province of Vojvodina. According to tradition, the monastery was founded by Zmaj Ognjeni Vuk (Despot Vuk Grgurević) in 1471. The earliest historical records about the monastery date back to 1545/1546. The monastery had been deserted before the 1690 Great Migration of the Serbs, but a renewal, undertaken by Bishop Isaija Đaković, took place in 1708. Around 1770, the extant baroque church was erected and it underwent restoration in 1898 under the guiding hand of Hermann Bollé. It was then that the residential buildings which enclose the church from all four sides were reconstructed. The first walled rocaille iconostasis in the church interior was painted and inlaid by Jakov Orfelin in 1774–1775. The extant iconostasis is a 1902 work of Uroš Predić.

Grgeteg Monastery was declared Monument of Culture of Exceptional Importance in 1990, and it is protected by the state.

== Gallery ==
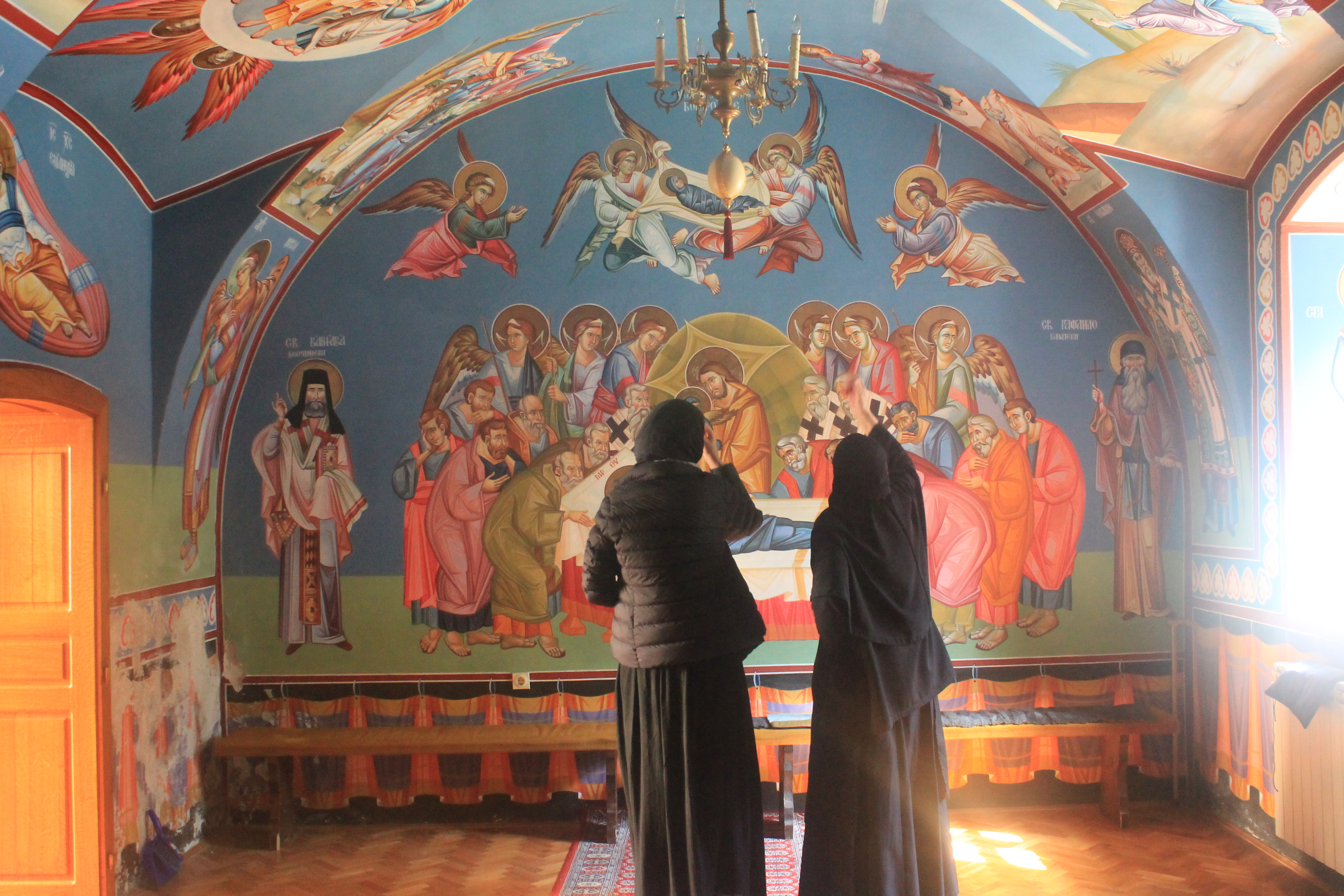
Grgeteg monastery

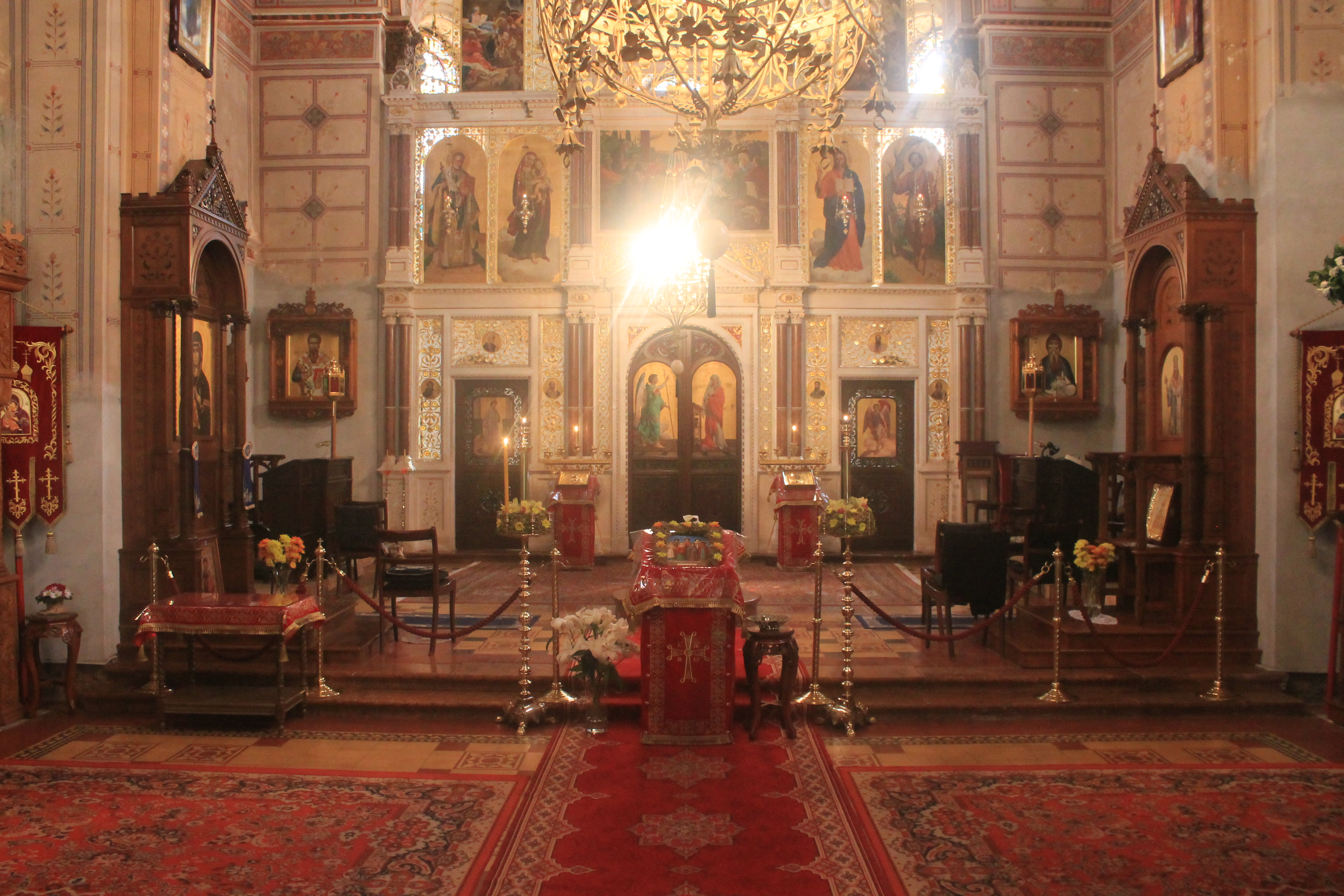
Grgeteg monastery interior

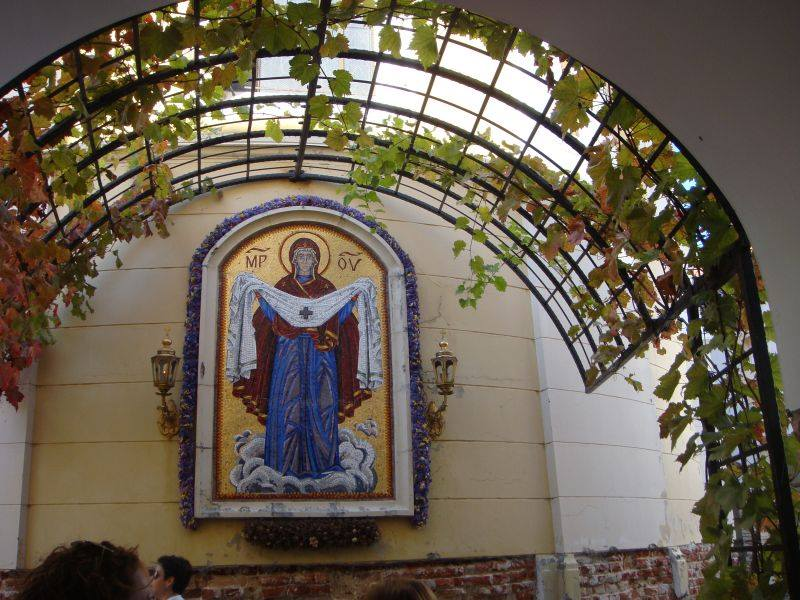
Grapevines

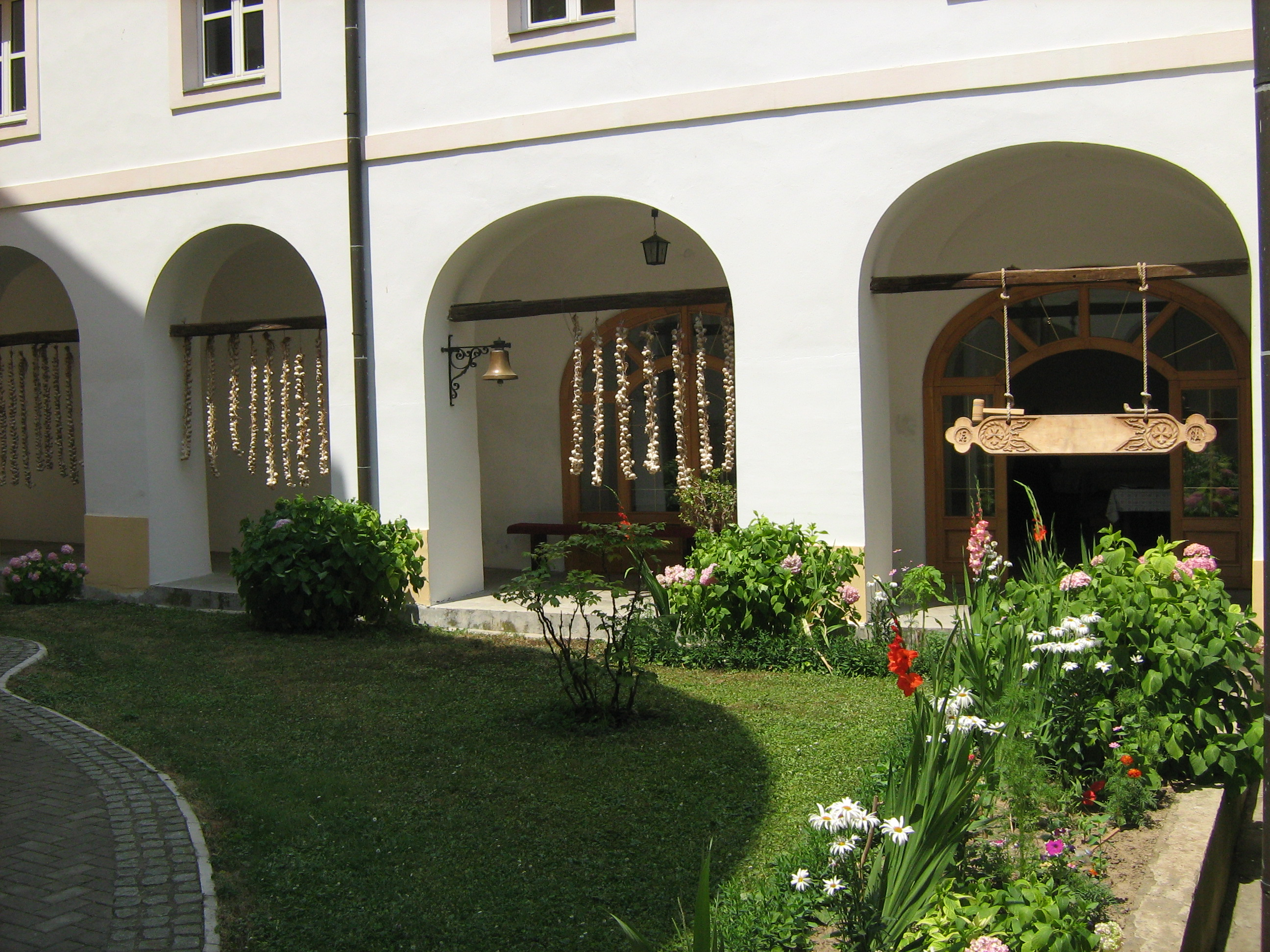
Internal garden

== See also ==
- List of Serbian Orthodox monasteries
