= Staro Hopovo Monastery =

Monastery in Serbia

Coordinates: 45°08′07″N 19°51′31″E

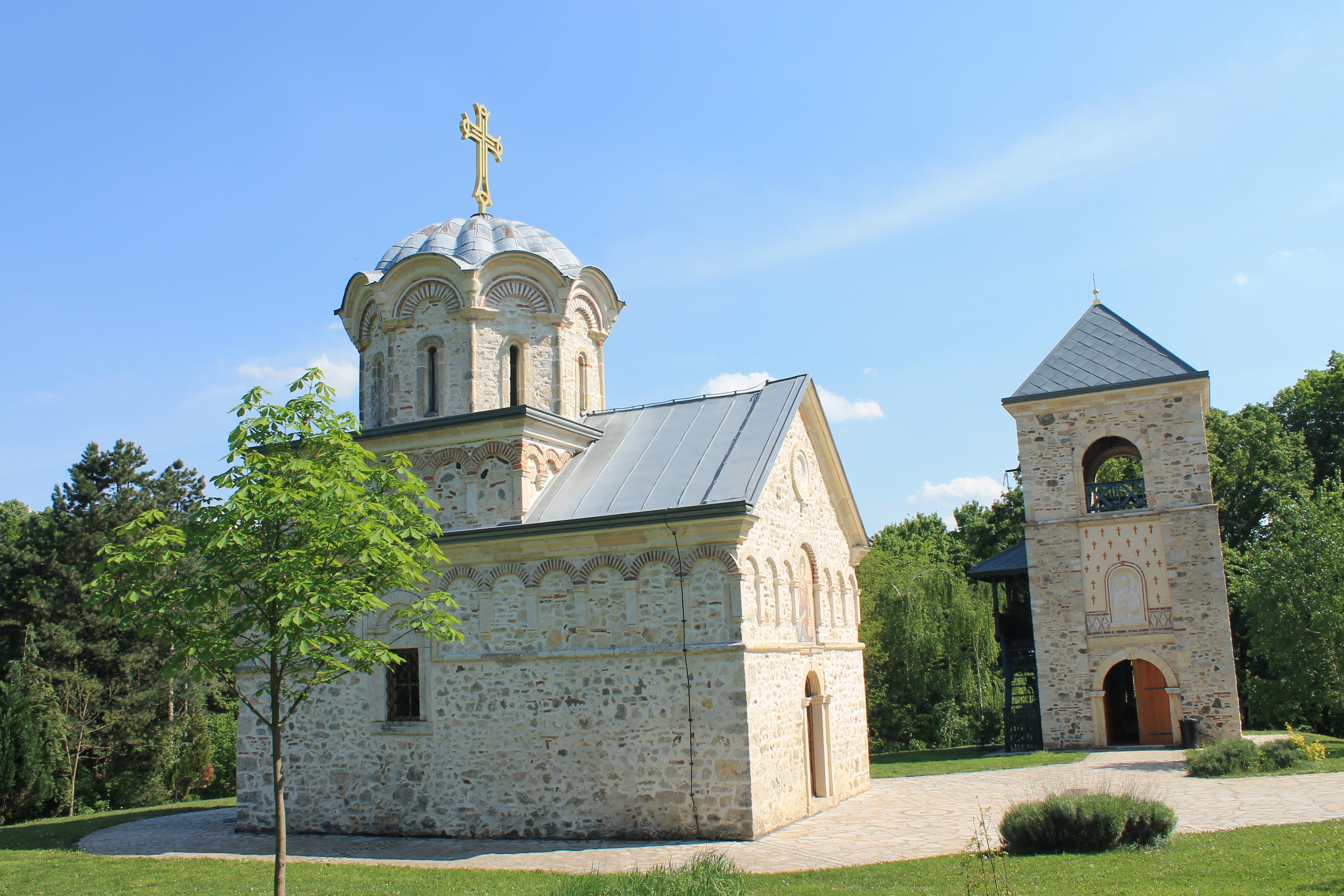
Monastery with bell tower

The Staro Hopovo Monastery (Serbian: Манастир Старо Хопово, romanized: Manastir Staro Hopovo) is a Serb Orthodox monastery on the Fruška Gora mountain in the northern Serbia, in the province of Vojvodina.

According to tradition, the monastery was founded by bishop Maksim (despot Đorđe Branković). The first reliable mention of the monastery dates back to 1545/1546. It is on the basis of some data from 1751 that an earlier church with timber walls dedicated to St. Nicholas existed. The old church which had collapsed in an earthquake was in 1752 substituted with the extant single-nave building dedicated to St. Panteleimon. The woodcarving of the iconostasis of Staro Hopovo was completed in 1793, and the paintings by Janko Halkozović and Kuzman Kolarić.

Staro Hopovo Monastery was declared Monument of Culture of Exceptional Importance in 1990, and it is protected by state.

== See also ==
- List of Serbian Orthodox monasteries
