= Mala Remeta Monastery =

Monastery in Serbia

Coordinates: 45°06′36″N 19°44′37″E

Mala Remeta
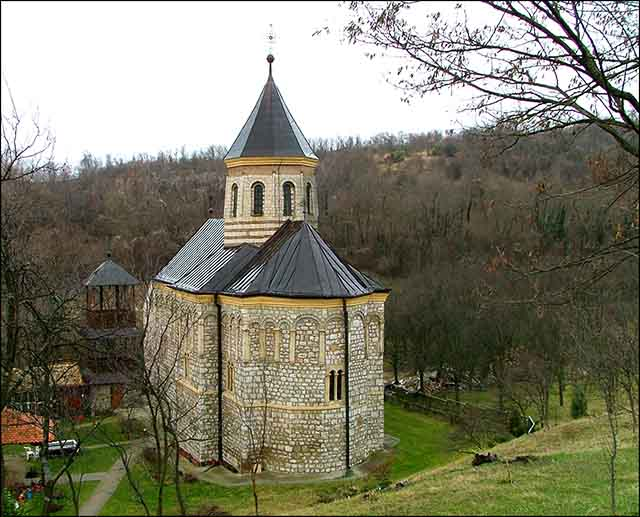
- Mala Remeta monastery
- Interactive map of Mala Remeta

Monastery information
- Full name: Манастир Мала Ремета
- Order: Serbian Orthodox
- Established: 13th century

People
- Founder: Stefan Dragutin

Architecture
- Style: Raška style

Site
- Location: Fruška Gora, Serbia
- Public access: Yes

The Mala Remeta Monastery (Serbian: Манастир Мала Ремета, romanized: Manastir Mala Remeta) is a Serb Orthodox monastery on the Fruška Gora mountain in the northern Serbia, in the province of Vojvodina. Its foundation is traditionally ascribed to the Serbian King Dragutin (1276–1282). The earliest historical records relating to the monastery date back to the middle of the 16th century. At the end of the 17th century, Turks had already destroyed it, so when Rača was torn down, the refugee monks came to their appendage Mala Remeta and reconstructed it. The appearance of the earlier church is not known, and the extant one was erected on the same site in 1739. The throne icons on the altar screen were painted by Janko Halkozović in 1759, and the wall paintings are a 1910 work of Kosta Vanđelović.

Mala Remeta Monastery was declared Monument of Culture of Exceptional Importance in 1990, and it is protected by the state.

== See also ==
- List of Serbian Orthodox monasteries
