= Kuveždin Monastery =

Monastery in Serbia

Coordinates: 45°07′38″N 19°30′41″E

Kuveždin
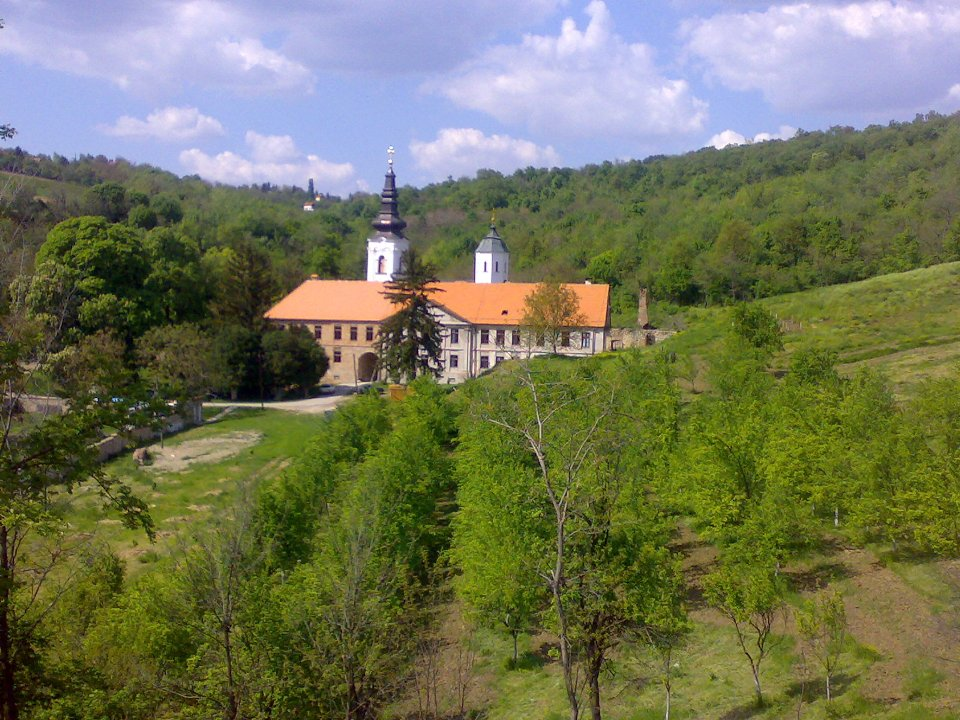
- Kuveždin monastery
- Interactive map of Kuveždin

Monastery information
- Full name: Манастир Кувеждин
- Order: Serbian Orthodox
- Established: 1566/1569

People
- Founder: Stefan Štiljanović

Site
- Location: Fruška Gora, Serbia
- Public access: Yes

The Kuveždin monastery (Serbian: Манастир Кувеждин, romanized: Manastir Kuveždin) is a Serb Orthodox monastery on the Fruška Gora mountain in the northern Serbian province of Vojvodina. Traditionally, its foundation is ascribed to Stefan Štiljanović (late 15th century). The first reliable record of its existence is from a Turkish tax book dated from 1566 to 1569, though the building was constructed much earlier. In 2009, the entire monastery complex has been reconstructed.

The iconostasis of the old church was given away to a church in the village of Opatovac in 1758. The current iconostasis and wall paintings in the new church were carried out by Pavle Simić from 1848 to 1853.

Kuveždin Monastery was declared Monument of Culture of Exceptional Importance in 1990, and it is protected by the state.

== See also ==
- List of Serbian Orthodox monasteries
