= Tourism in Serbia =

- Time zone: UTC+1 (Central European Time)
- Area code: + 381
- Website: Official Tourist webpage

Tourism in Serbia is officially recognized as a primary area for economic and social growth. The hotel and catering sector accounted for approximately 2.2% of GDP in 2015. Tourism in Serbia employs some 120 000 people, about 4.5% of the country's workforce. In recent years the number of tourists is increasing. In 2019, tourism generated an income of nearly $1.698 billion, hosting 1.85 million tourists. Chinese tourists were the most numerous visitors, followed by tourists from Bosnia and Herzegovina, Bulgaria, Turkey, and Germany. In 2022, tourism earnings surged to $2.71 billion and almost 2 million tourists visited the country. Major destinations for foreign tourists are Belgrade, Novi Sad and Niš, while domestic tourists prefer spas and mountain resorts. Eco-friendly and sustainable tourism has also become very popular among domestic tourists, with many visiting various nature reserves and parks in the western and southern part of the country. Serbia is also known for gastronomic tourism, with Belgrade being the central meeting point with over 2000 restaurants, coffee shops, bars and nightlife venues.

== History ==
=== Origins ===
The origin of tourism in Serbia is connected to the abundance of thermal and mineral springs: so much so, that history of Serbian tourism is sometimes equated to the history of Serbian spas. (The Serbian word for spa, banja, became part of numerous toponyms.) Some of them had a wider historical and evolutionary impact as remains of the prehistoric habitats have been discovered around them. Wider, practical use came with the Roman conquest in the 1st century AD. The Romans also developed other public activities as predecessors of modern tourism, especially around Singidunum, precursor of modern Belgrade. Hilly areas east of the city, along the Danube river functioned as an excursion area, with numerous villas and summer houses for more affluent citizens. In the area of Belgrade's modern neighborhoods Ada Huja and Karaburma, which were outside of the city in the Roman period, numerous thermal springs were used for public bathhouses.

The Byzantines, the successors to the Romans, continued to use the spas. In the medieval Serbian state, some spas prospered. There are records of springs around Čačak, modern Ovčar Banja, where "magnificent" high domes were built, with a large pool, numerous smaller cooling pools (as the thermal water was too hot), and large living and dressing rooms. They were opened for both the gentry and the commoners. Serbia also inherited important Roman roads, like the Via Militaris, which in the Middle Ages developed into the Tsarigrad Road, with some additional trading routes developing in time. With numerous merchants and caravans traversing the country, hospitality services began to develop along the roads. They included large inns and caravan stations with spacious inner yards for keeping animals and storing goods. The inns had upper floors and sleeping rooms, and some were designated for merchants only. Emperor Dušan established an obligation called priselica by which the denizens were obliged to host domestic dignitaries and foreign representatives. It was compulsory only for the residents of the rural areas, since the towns had inns to provide the service. The innkeepers and were bound to pay for any damage or shortage during a caravan's stay in their facilities.

Use of spas continued after the Ottoman conquest in the 15th century. The Ottomans added the specific architecture, which included hamams (Turkish bathhouses) and specific oriental ornamentation of the spa objects. After visiting Ovčar Banja in 1664, Ottoman traveler Evliya Çelebi wrote that 40,000 to 50,000 people visit during the summer ("watermelon") season, but also described the spa as the location of numerous fairs and as a major trading place. Some of the hamams have survived until today, including that in Sokobanja, while several are still in use (Brestovačka Banja, Novopazarska Banja). Hills east of Belgrade remained popular excursion sites during the Ottoman period. The upper classes built numerous summer houses, especially on the Ekmekluk Hill, today known as Zvezdara.

By the 2020s, the second most visited tourist attraction in Belgrade, providing one third of foreign currency income for the city, was the bohemian quarter Skadarlija, a vintage street dotted with kafanas. The very first kafana in Belgrade, an oriental-style bistro, was opened in 1522 and was arguably the oldest venue of that type in Europe. It served only Turkish coffee, but later some offered nargile also. Despite frequent Ottoman–Habsburg wars in the 17th and 18th centuries, and the change of occupying rulers in Belgrade and northern Serbia, the number of kafanas was always high.

As Serbia remained on the main trading route connecting Middle East and western Europe, the hospitality venues along the roads continued to develop. During the Ottoman period, the caravans grew bigger, involving new animals, so the caravans of 500–650 camels were recorded. When Çelebi visited Belgrade in 1661, he counted 21 khans and 6 caravanserais. The largest was the Caravanserai of Sokollu Mehmed Pasha, which had "160 chimneys", while some of the larger ones even had harem sections.

=== Early modern developments ===
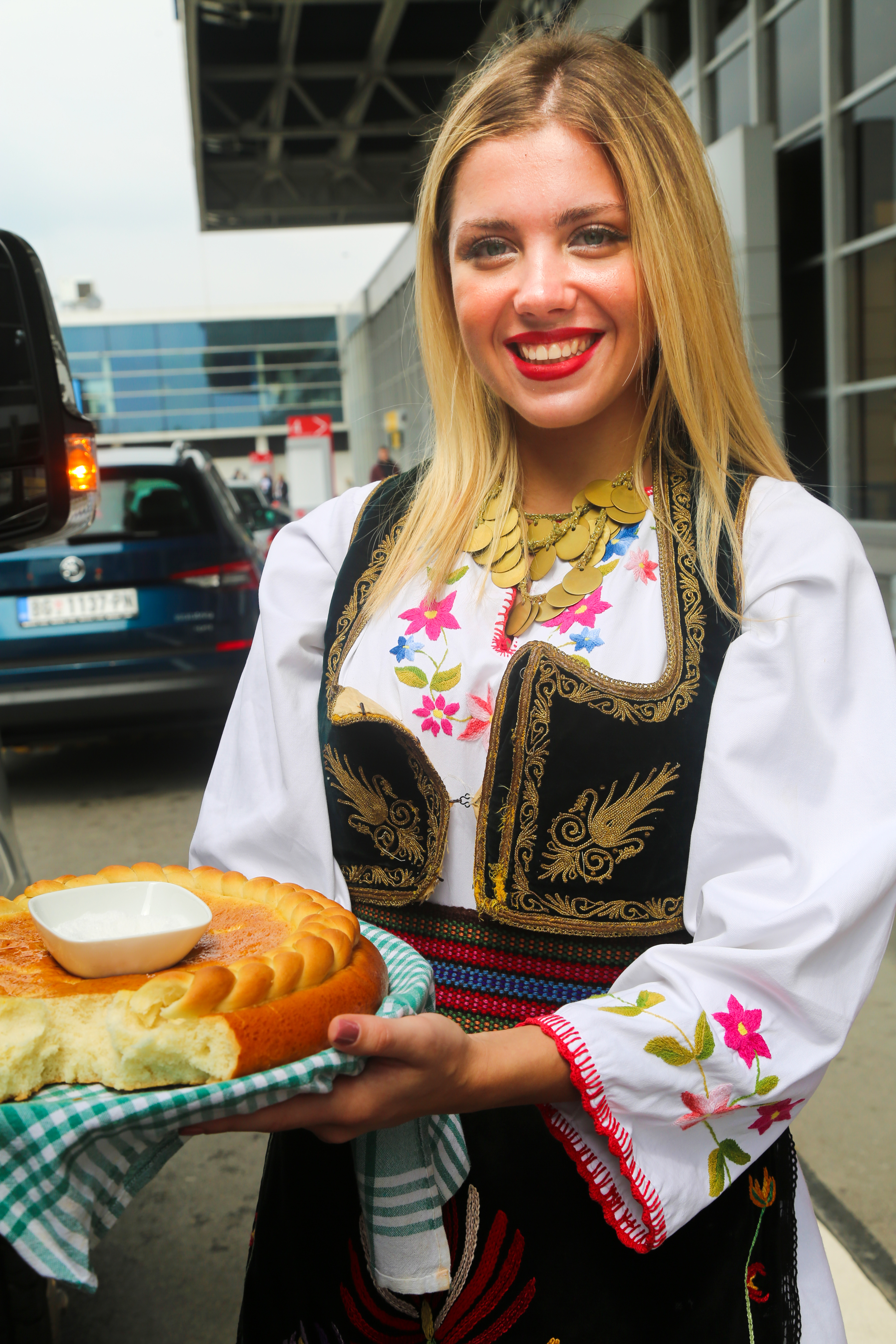
Traditional welcoming with bread and salt

The origin of modern tourism in Serbia can be traced to the 19th century. The Serbian government, and the rulers personally, actively participated in development of the spas, by hiring foreign geologists to survey the spa waters and sending medics to the newly-formed spa centers. In time, they attracted foreign visitors, mostly from Austria-Hungary and Greece. Before World War I, Banja Koviljača, Niška Banja and Vranjska Banja emerged as the most visited spas, though Vrnjačka Banja, Sokobanja and Ribarska Banja are considered to be among the oldest. Also popular was one of the latest discovered, Mataruška Banja, which was founded in the late 19th century.

Hospitality services in towns later diversified into numerous types: bistro, mehana, gostionica, han, saraj, lokal, krčma, bircuz, birtija, and later restoran and hotel, but until the mid-19th century they remained oriental-type venues. In 1847, the ruling prince Alexander Karađorđević codified the work of the hospitality objects. The first hotel in Belgrade, "Kod Jelena", was built in 1843. Later known as "Staro Zdanje", it had the first ballroom in Belgrade and introduced the European style of entertainment. Construction of various modern hotels began in Belgrade, including "Evropa" (1867), "Nacional" (1868), "Srpska Kruna" (1869), "Pariz" (1870), "London" (1873), "Slavija" (1883), "Moskva" (1908) and "Bristol" (1912).

Though the development of tourism was boosted by the burgeoning middle class, many people were still unable to travel around the state so further excursion areas developed around the cities. The southern hills of Belgrade now became the main tourism area. Topčider Park began to be planted in the 1830s. After the Topčider railway station was built in 1884, and later the tram line No. 3 started, this park became accessible to everyone from downtown. The neighboring forest in Košutnjak followed when the former royal hunting ground from the 1840s was adapted into a public park in 1903. Due to the beneficial climate conditions, the summer sanatorium for children was built in the forest. Former artificial Lake Kijevo was formed in 1901. As Kijevo also had its own railway station, special tourist trains were organized for the inhabitants of Belgrade.

A vital boost to the development of international tourism was the construction of the first railway in 1884. In general, development of transportation always pushed tourism growth, as in 1892 when public transportation was organized in Belgrade, and after 1903 when the modern street grid was built following the arrival of first cars.

Major development of tourism in the early 20th century was halted by the outbreak of World War I.

=== Interbellum ===
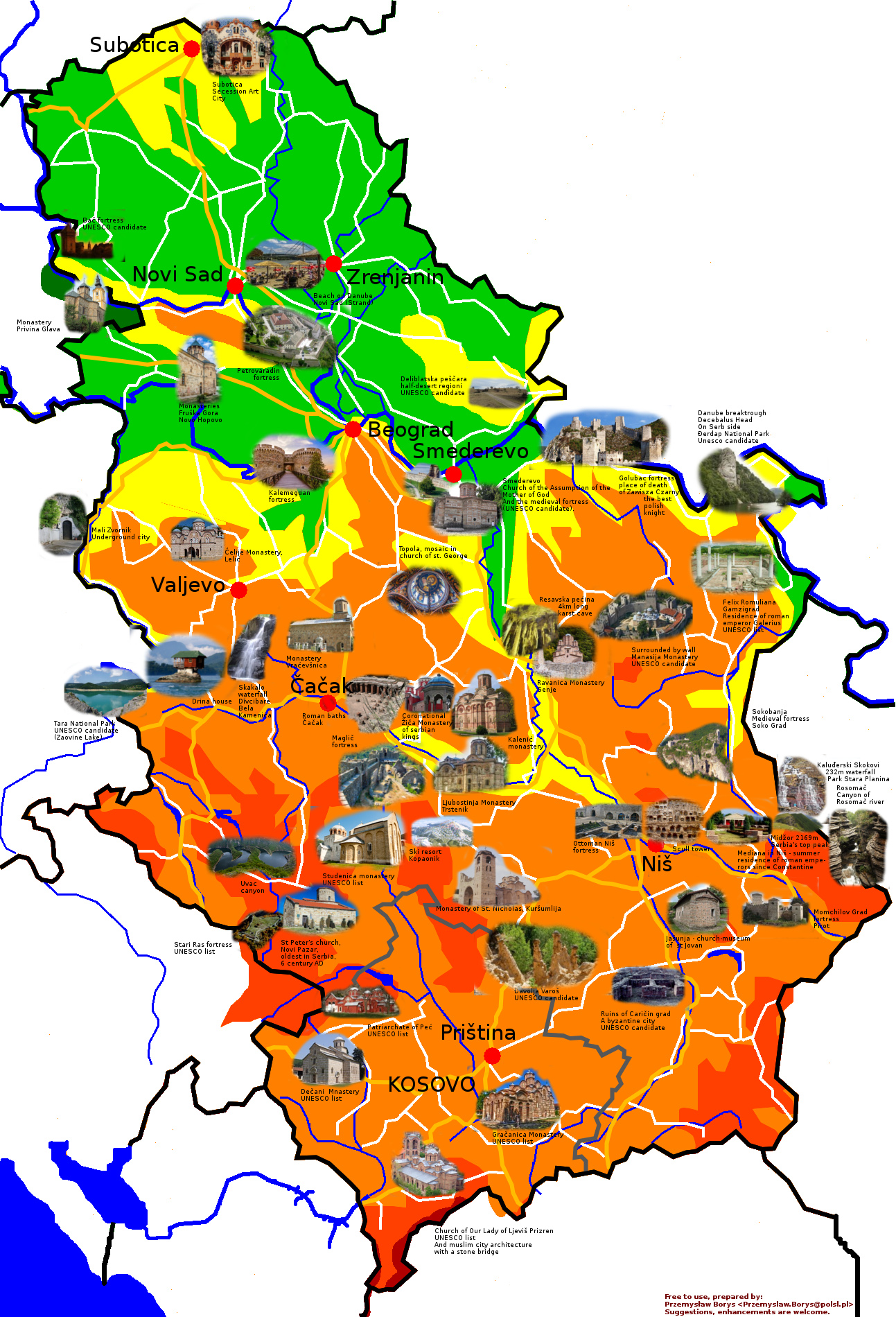
A map featuring some of the best-known tourist attractions in Serbia

In 1918 Serbia became part of the new state, the Kingdom of the Serbs, Croats and Slovenes, later named Yugoslavia. In Serbia, spas remained the only proper tourist centers until after World War II. Villas of the royal family and wealthy industrialists and merchants boosted the construction of mansions and hotels. They became urban centers and small towns. Visiting spas became a matter of prestige and they remained immensely popular. In 1937, Vrnjačka Banja had five times more visitors than Dubrovnik, on the Adriatic coast (in modern Croatia), arguably the most popular resort in former Yugoslavia. In 1922, there were over 2 million overnight stays in the spas of the Morava Banovina alone, which covered a minority of the present Serbia territory.

In 1920, Belgrade became a stop on the route of the famed Orient Express. Also in the 1920s, the tourist traffic developed along major rivers, like the Danube, Sava and Tisza. Further growth of tourism was greatly influenced by the development of air traffic. State airline flag carrier Aeroput was founded in 1927, the same year when Belgrade's international Bežanija airport became operational. Yugoslavia soon developed a network of airports.

Belgrade was declared a tourist place in 1936. Construction of the Belgrade Fair in 1937 helped turn the city into the international tourist hot spot and pushed for fast construction of numerous hotels and other hospitality venues and the establishment of the hospitality high school. The first international fair in 1937 hosted exhibitors from 17 European, American and Asian countries. Over 310,000 people visited the exhibition, more than the population of Belgrade at the time. This was followed by numerous other exhibitions, including the first motor show, the 1938 Belgrade Car Show. In 1939, the Belgrade Grand Prix, precursor of modern Formula One, was organized in the city.

Just as in 1914, this fast tourist development was cut short by the war.

=== Post-war period ===
Tourism regained major economic importance only in the 1970s. But by the 1980s Yugoslavia was an important tourist destination in the Balkans. Overnight stays were almost 12 million per year, of which about 1.5 million were by foreign tourists. The events surrounding the break-up of Yugoslavia led to a substantial decline in both leisure and business tourism.

New Communist authorities after the war made spas much more accessible. Stripped of the bourgeois elitism, the spas became centers of healthcare tourism and sites of family vacations, with numerous workers' and trade unions' retreats being built.

Number of tourists in Serbia from 1948 to 1999. Visitors from the rest of Yugoslavia (from 1992 only from Montenegro) were counted as domestic ones.

1940s & 1950s
| Year | Arrivals | Domestic | Foreign |
|---|---|---|---|
| 1948 | 480,000 | 463,200 | 16,800 |
| 1949 | 567,000 | 557,700 | 9,300 |
| 1950 | 754,000 | 747,200 | 6,800 |
| 1951 | 823,000 | 810,500 | 12,500 |
| 1952 | 846,000 | 826,500 | 19,500 |
| 1953 | 1,047,000 | 1,012,700 | 34,300 |
| 1954 | 865,000 | 825,300 | 39,700 |
| 1955 | 888,000 | 837,200 | 50,800 |
| 1956 | 942,000 | 877,600 | 64,400 |
| 1957 | 1,029,000 | 955,400 | 73,600 |
| 1958 | 1,131,000 | 1,043,800 | 87,200 |
| 1959 | 1,275,000 | 1,161,800 | 114,000 |

1960s
| Year | Arrivals | Domestic | Foreign |
|---|---|---|---|
| 1960 | 1,538,000 | 1,405,800 | 133,000 |
| 1961 | 1,518,000 | 1,365,000 | 153,000 |
| 1962 | 1,484,000 | 1,289,000 | 195,000 |
| 1963 | 1,634,000 | 1,361,000 | 273,000 |
| 1964 | 2,015,000 | 1,699,000 | 316,000 |
| 1965 | 2,242,000 | 1,859,000 | 383,000 |
| 1966 | 2,460,000 | 1,987,000 | 473,000 |
| 1967 | 2,578,000 | 2,057,000 | 521,000 |
| 1968 | 2,819,000 | 2,242,000 | 577,000 |
| 1969 | 3,152,000 | 2,490,000 | 662,000 |

1970s
| Year | Arrivals | Domestic | Foreign |
|---|---|---|---|
| 1970 | 3,323,000 | 2,636,000 | 687,000 |
| 1971 | 3,369,000 | 2,665,000 | 704,000 |
| 1972 | 3,373,000 | 2,673,000 | 700,000 |
| 1973 | 3,700,000 | 2,879,000 | 821,000 |
| 1974 | 3,860,000 | 3,095,000 | 765,000 |
| 1975 | 4,021,000 | 3,179,000 | 842,000 |
| 1976 | 4,144,000 | 3,297,000 | 847,000 |
| 1977 | 3,967,000 | 3,123,000 | 844,000 |
| 1978 | 4,162,000 | 3,321,000 | 841,000 |
| 1979 | 4,136,000 | 3,301,000 | 835,000 |

1980s
| Year | Arrivals | Domestic | Foreign |
|---|---|---|---|
| 1980 | 4,328,000 | 3,460,000 | 868,000 |
| 1981 | 4,386,000 | 3,533,000 | 853,000 |
| 1982 | 4,447,000 | 3,632,000 | 815,000 |
| 1983 | 4,419,000 | 3,675,000 | 744,000 |
| 1984 | 4,606,000 | 3,820,000 | 786,000 |
| 1985 | 4,746,000 | 3,899,000 | 847,000 |
| 1986 | 4,725,000 | 3,869,000 | 856,000 |
| 1987 | 4,591,000 | 3,691,000 | 900,000 |
| 1988 | 4,507,000 | 3,577,000 | 930,000 |
| 1989 | 4,158,000 | 3,217,000 | 941,000 |

1990s
| Year | Arrivals | Domestic | Foreign |
|---|---|---|---|
| 1990 | 3,949,000 | 3,068,000 | 881,000 |
| 1991 | 2,823,000 | 2,476,000 | 347,000 |
| 1992 | 2,693,000 | 2,557,000 | 136,000 |
| 1993 | 2,107,000 | 2,038,600 | 68,400 |
| 1994 | 2,172,000 | 1,954,000 | 218,000 |
| 1995 | 2,432,000 | 2,228,000 | 204,000 |
| 1996 | | | |
| 1997 | | | |
| 1998 | | | |
| 1999 | | | |

=== 21st century ===
In the twenty-first century tourism began to recover: the number of overseas visitors was 90% higher in 2004 than it had been in 2000, and revenue from foreign tourism more than tripled between 2002 and 2004, to about 220 million US dollars. By 2010 revenue from international tourism had grown to 798 million US dollars.

By 2020, there were 35 officially proclaimed and operational spas. However, many additional ones went out of work during the international sanctions in the 1990s and the transitional period in the 2000s. For example, Jošanička Banja was closed, Niška Banja was effectively out of use, while Vrnjačka Banja and Sokobanja boomed. In spas, new hotels were built, so as many wellness centers.

Due to the COVID-19 pandemic, tourism industry in Serbia has faced multi-million dollar losses. The number of overall tourist arrivals in 2020 was the smallest in the past two decades, but it is expected to recover and stabilise within the near future.

The country is becoming a more attractive destination for business tourism, with a number of international events meeting ICCA standards being organized.

== Internationally known annual events ==
| Name | Location | Month | Type of Festival |
|---|---|---|---|
| Küstendorf Film and Music Festival | Drvengrad | January | Film and Music Festival |
| Gitarijada | Zaječar | June | Rock and Roll Music Festival |
| Palić European Film Festival | Palić | July | European Film festival |
| Belgrade Beer Fest | Belgrade | August | Beer and Music Festival |
| Guča Trumpet Festival | Guča | August | Brass Band Festival |
| Nišville | Niš | August | Jazz Music Festival |
| Lovefest | Vrnjačka Banja | August | Electronic Music Festival |
| Beer Days | Zrenjanin | August | Beer Festival |
| Leskovac Grill Festival | Leskovac | September | Grilled Meat Festival |

== Statistics ==
Tourist arrivals of 2023 in %

=== Arrivals per year ===
| Year | Arrivals | Domestic | Foreign |
|---|---|---|---|
| 2000 | 2,169,225 | 2,003,549 | 165,676 |
| 2001 | 2,129,128 | 1,886,603 | 242,525 |
| 2002 | 2,209,675 | 1,897,612 | 312,063 |
| 2003 | 1,997,948 | 1,658,665 | 339,283 |
| 2004 | 1,971,683 | 1,579,857 | 391,826 |
| 2005 | 1,988,469 | 1,535,790 | 452,679 |
| 2006 | 2,006,488 | 1,537,646 | 468,842 |
| 2007 | 2,306,558 | 1,610,513 | 696,045 |
| 2008 | 2,266,166 | 1,619,672 | 646,494 |
| 2009 | 2,018,466 | 1,373,444 | 645,022 |
| 2010 | 2,000,597 | 1,317,916 | 682,681 |
| 2011 | 2,068,610 | 1,304,443 | 764,167 |
| 2012 | 2,079,643 | 1,269,676 | 809,967 |
| 2013 | 2,192,435 | 1,270,667 | 921,768 |
| 2014 | 2,192,268 | 1,163,536 | 1,028,732 |
| 2015 | 2,437,165 | 1,304,944 | 1,132,221 |
| 2016 | 2,753,591 | 1,472,165 | 1,281,426 |
| 2017 | 3,085,866 | 1,588,693 | 1,497,173 |
| 2018 | 3,430,522 | 1,720,008 | 1,710,514 |
| 2019 | 3,689,983 | 1,843,432 | 1,846,551 |
| 2020 | 1,820,021 | 1,374,310 | 445,711 |
| 2021 | 2,591,293 | 1,720,054 | 871,239 |
| 2022 | 3,869,235 | 2,096,472 | 1,772,763 |
| 2023 | 4,192,797 | 2,058,492 | 2,134,305 |
| 2024 | 4,432,751 | 2,048,016 | 2,384,735 |
| 2025 | 4,346,691 | 1,998,196 | 2,348,495 |
| 2026 (January-September) | 3,572,558 | 1,656,157 | 1,916,401 |

=== Arrivals by country ===
Numbers of international visitors
| | 2024 | | 2025 | | 2026 (January-September) | |
| # | Country | Arrivals | Country | Arrivals | Country | Arrivals |
|---|---|---|---|---|---|---|
| 1 | Turkey | 232,527 | Turkey | 244,651 | Turkey | 193,384 |
| 2 | Russia | 184,609 | China incl. Hong Kong | 184,042 | Russia | 174,082 |
| 3 | Bosnia and Herzegovina | 167,983 | Russia | 173,867 | Bosnia and Herzegovina | 127,301 |
| 4 | China incl. Hong Kong | 156,644 | Bosnia and Herzegovina | 157,920 | Germany | 118,100 |
| 5 | Bulgaria | 132,054 | Germany | 133,614 | China incl. Hong Kong | 108,981 |
| 6 | Germany | 130,485 | North Macedonia | 122,731 | North Macedonia | 98,436 |
| 7 | Croatia | 120,637 | Bulgaria | 119,392 | Romania | 89,053 |
| 8 | North Macedonia | 118,605 | Romania | 106,362 | Bulgaria | 86,484 |
| 9 | Romania | 111,232 | Montenegro | 101,219 | Montenegro | 81,831 |
| 10 | Montenegro | 104,543 | Greece | 79,025 | Croatia | 64,845 |
| 11 | Slovenia | 86,648 | Croatia | 77,451 | Greece | 55,111 |
| 12 | Greece | 74,543 | Slovenia | 67,191 | Hungary | 53,956 |
| 13 | Poland | 59,320 | Poland | 61,205 | Poland | 52,960 |
| 14 | Hungary | 58,975 | Hungary | 60,350 | Slovenia | 50,812 |
| 15 | Italy | 52,182 | Italy | 52,136 | United States of America | 46,758 |
| | Total | 2,384,735 | Total | 2,348,495 | Total | 1,916,401 |

== Gallery ==
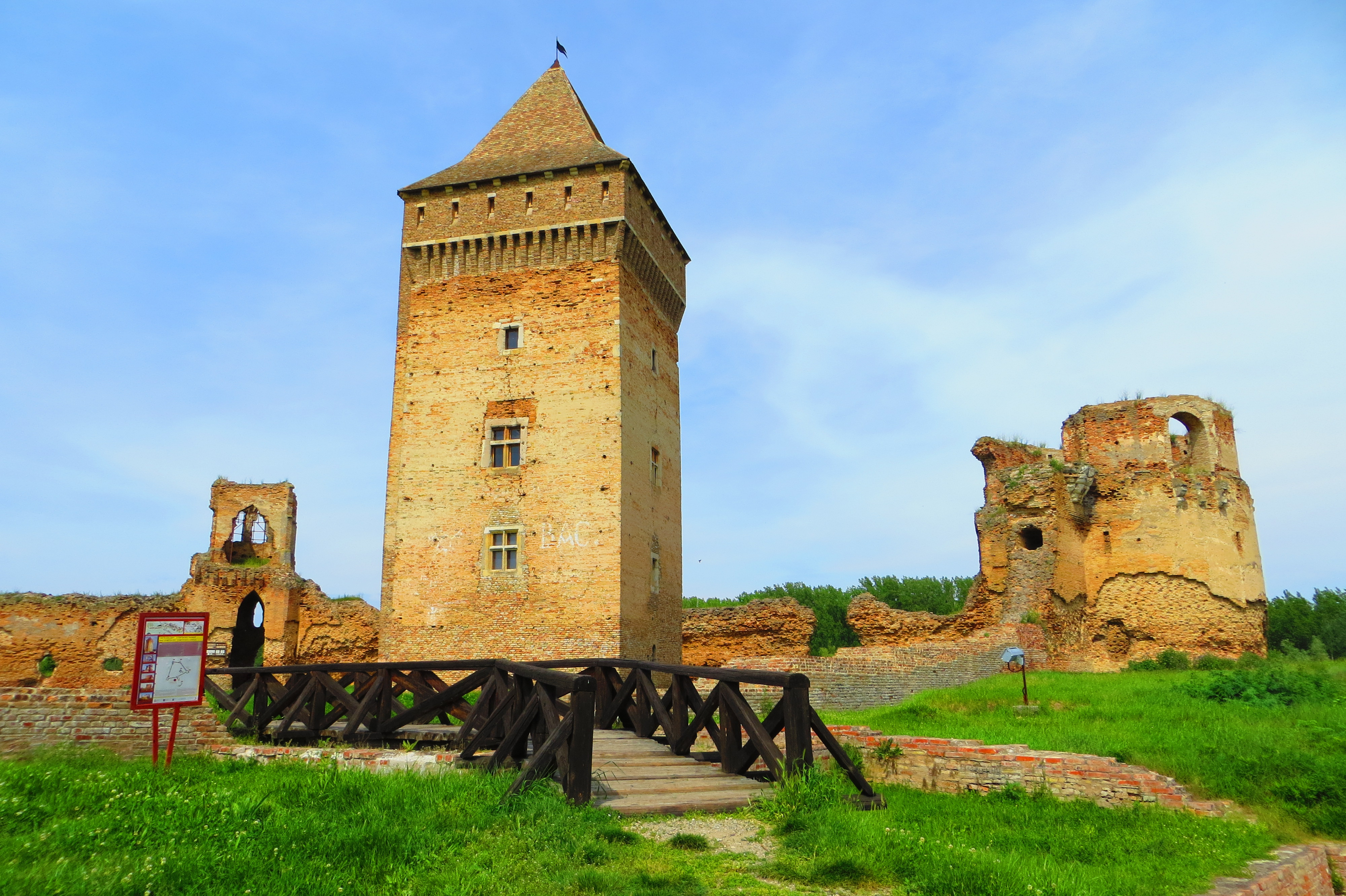
Bač Fortress

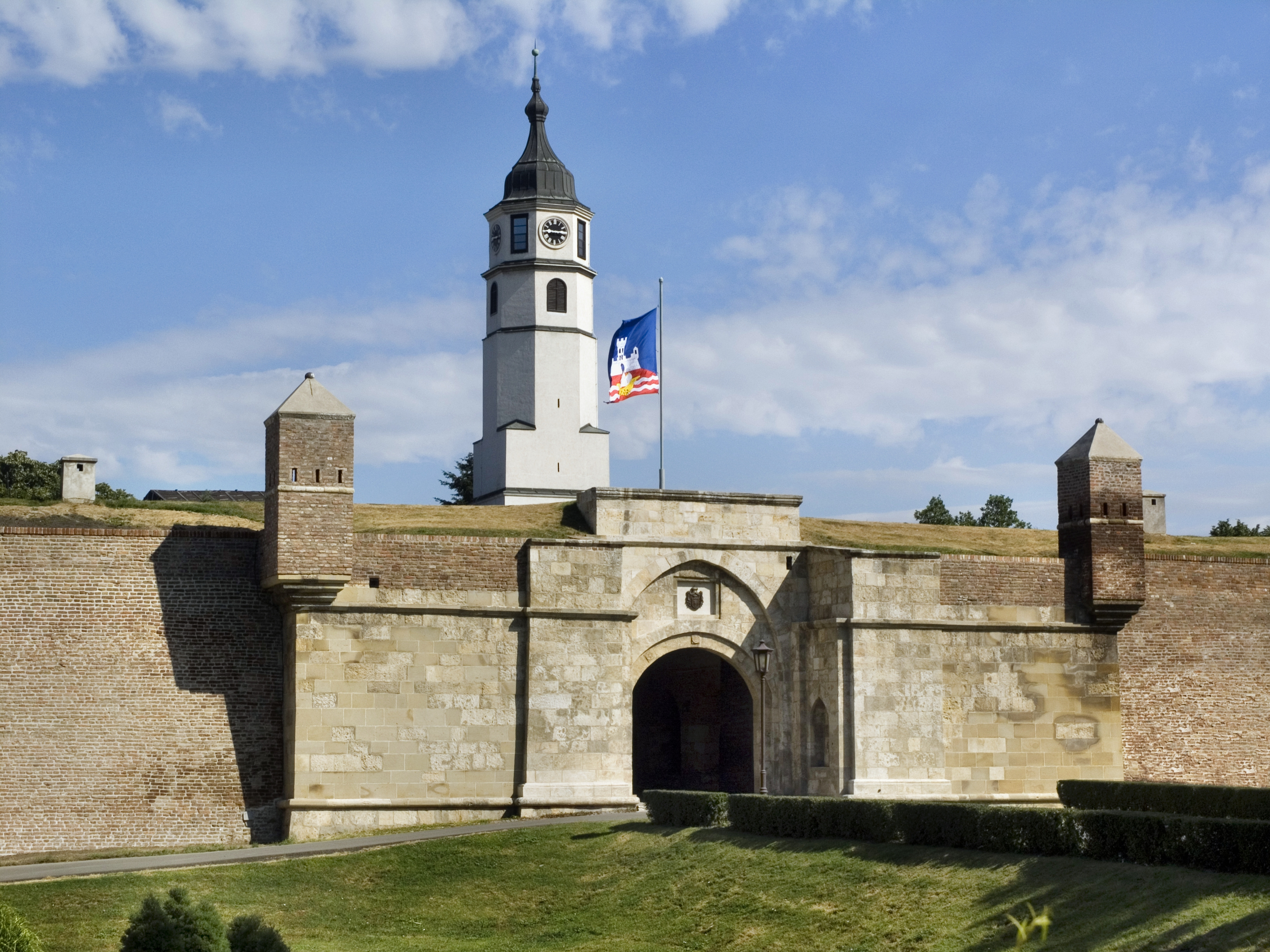
Belgrade Fortress

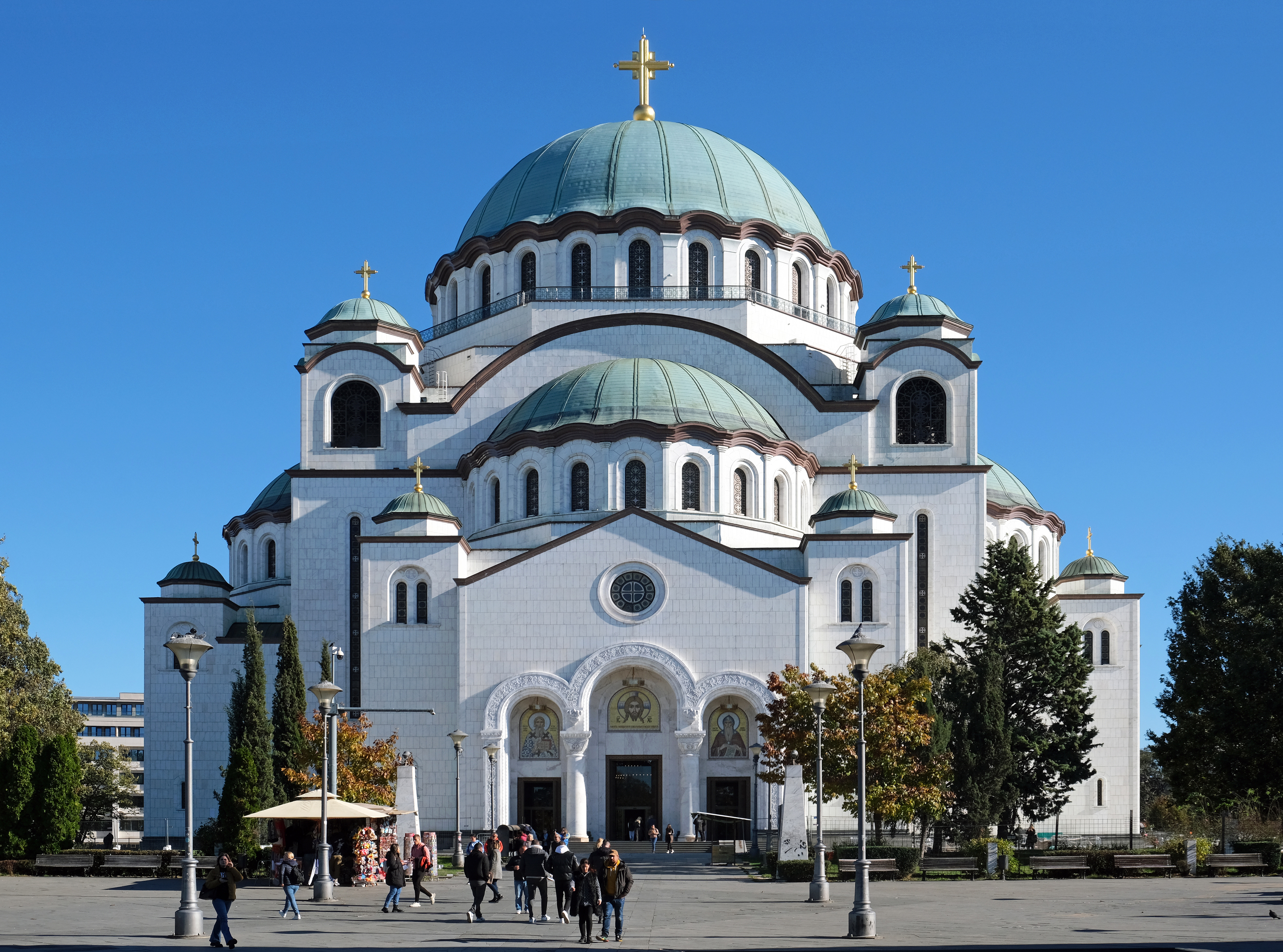
Church of Saint Sava

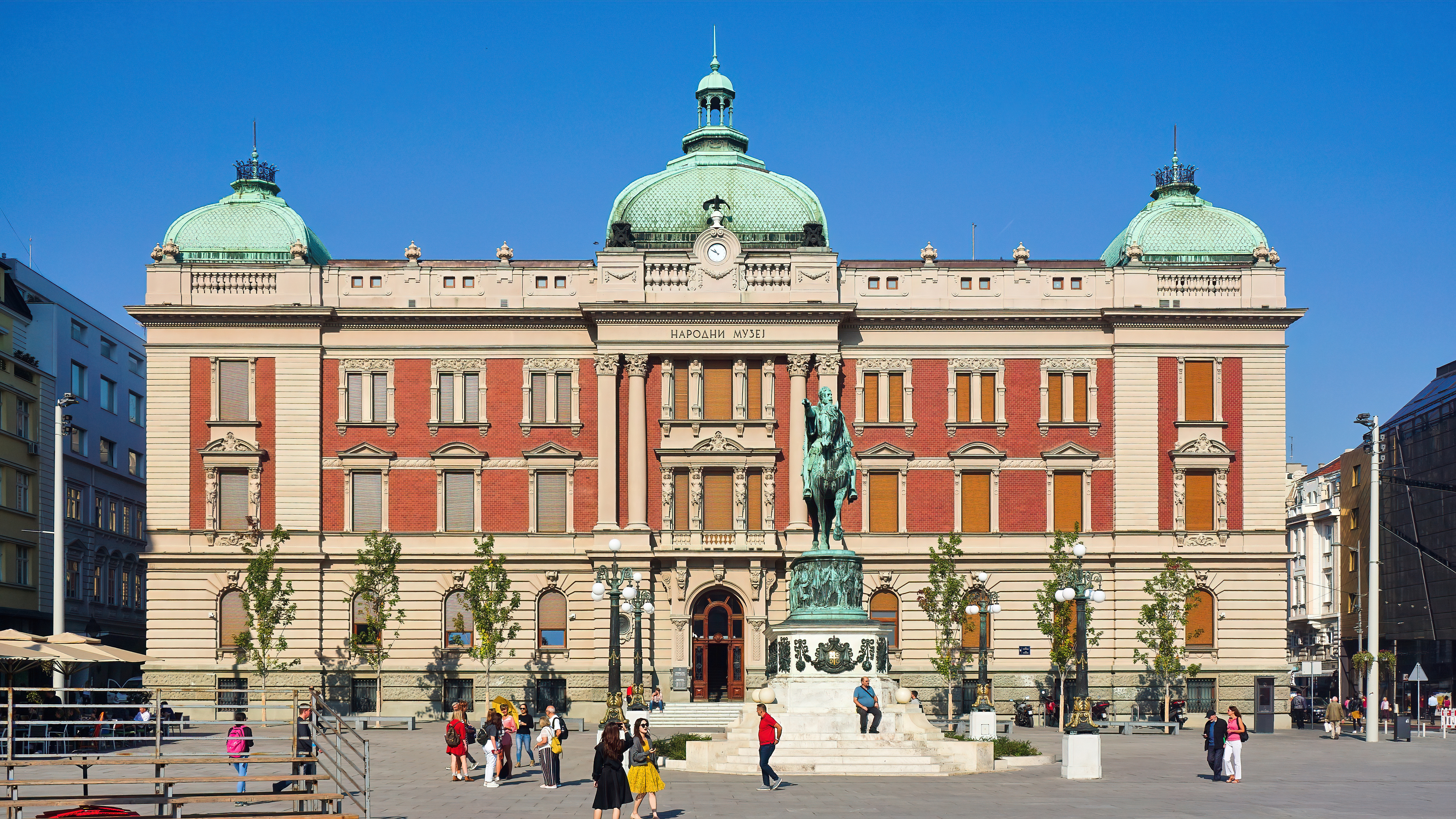
National Museum of Serbia

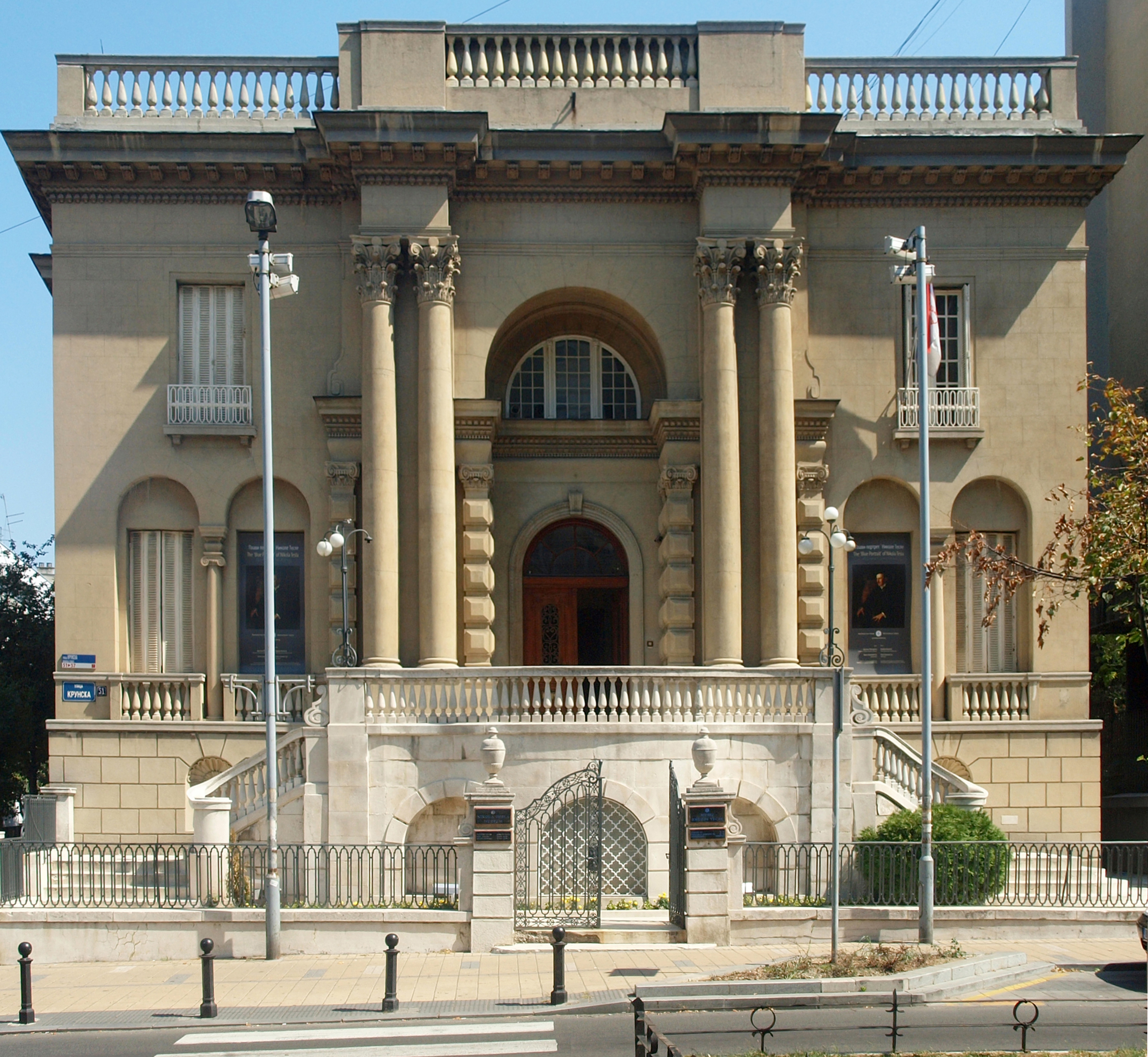
Nikola Tesla Museum

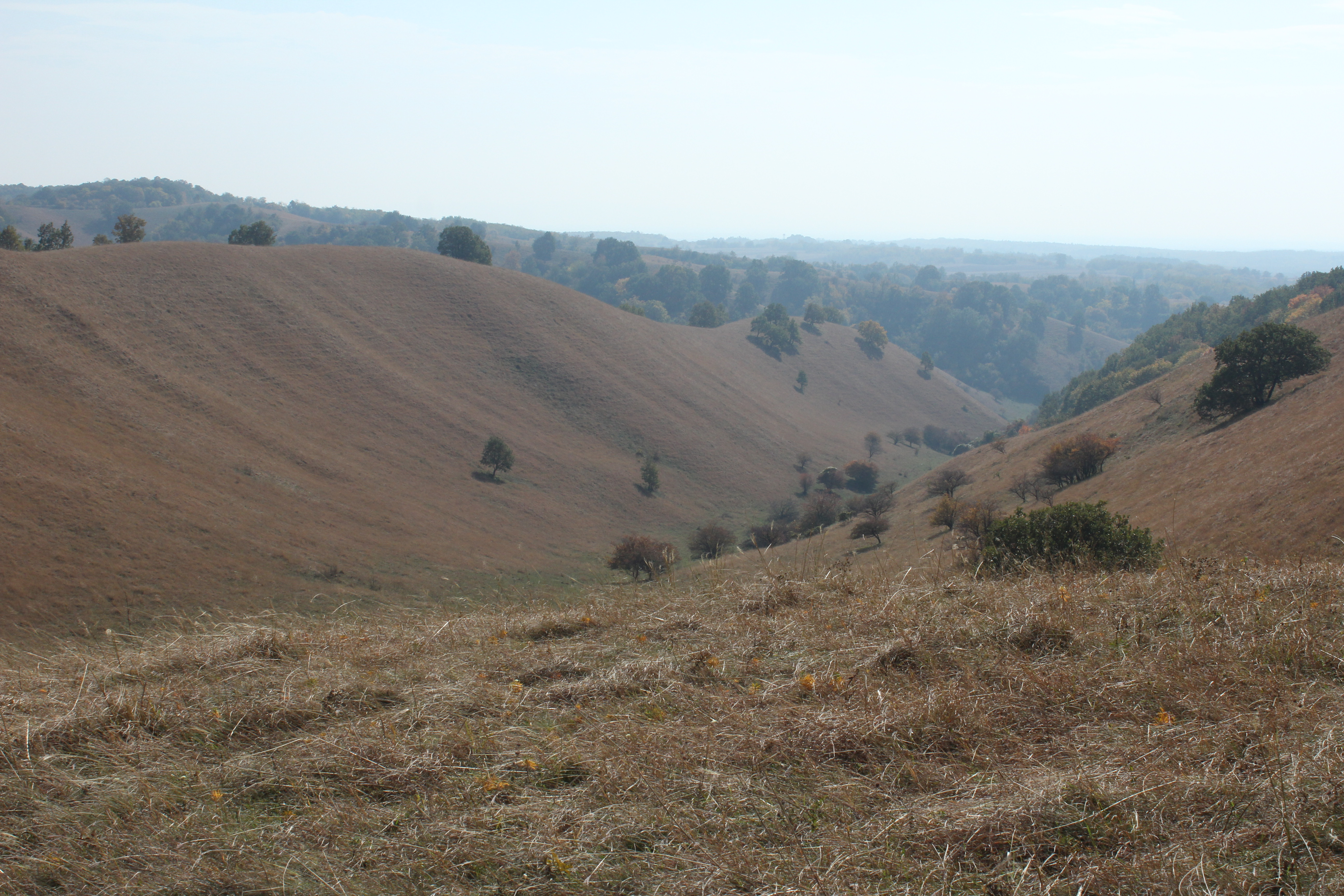
Deliblato Sands

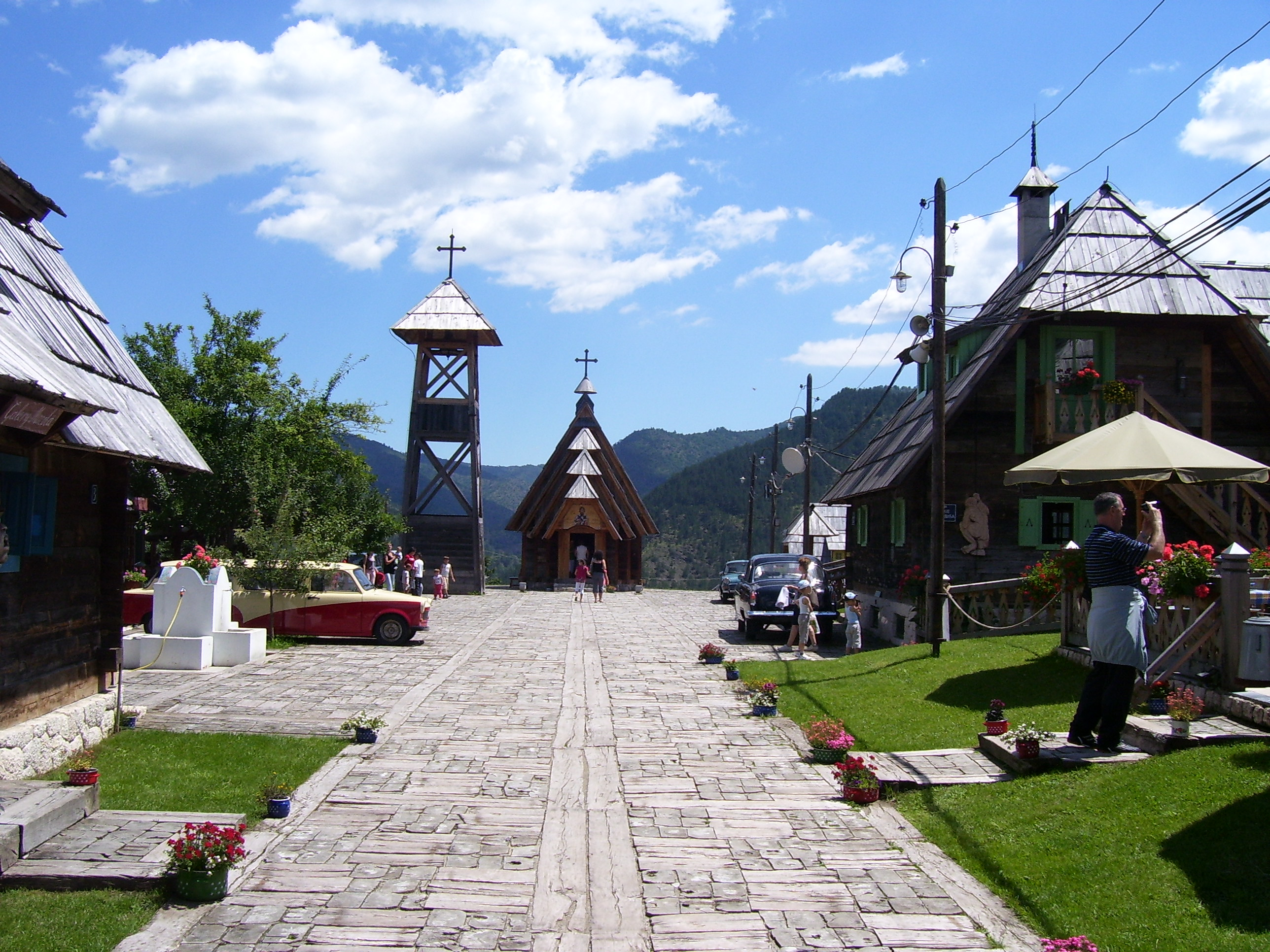
Drvengrad

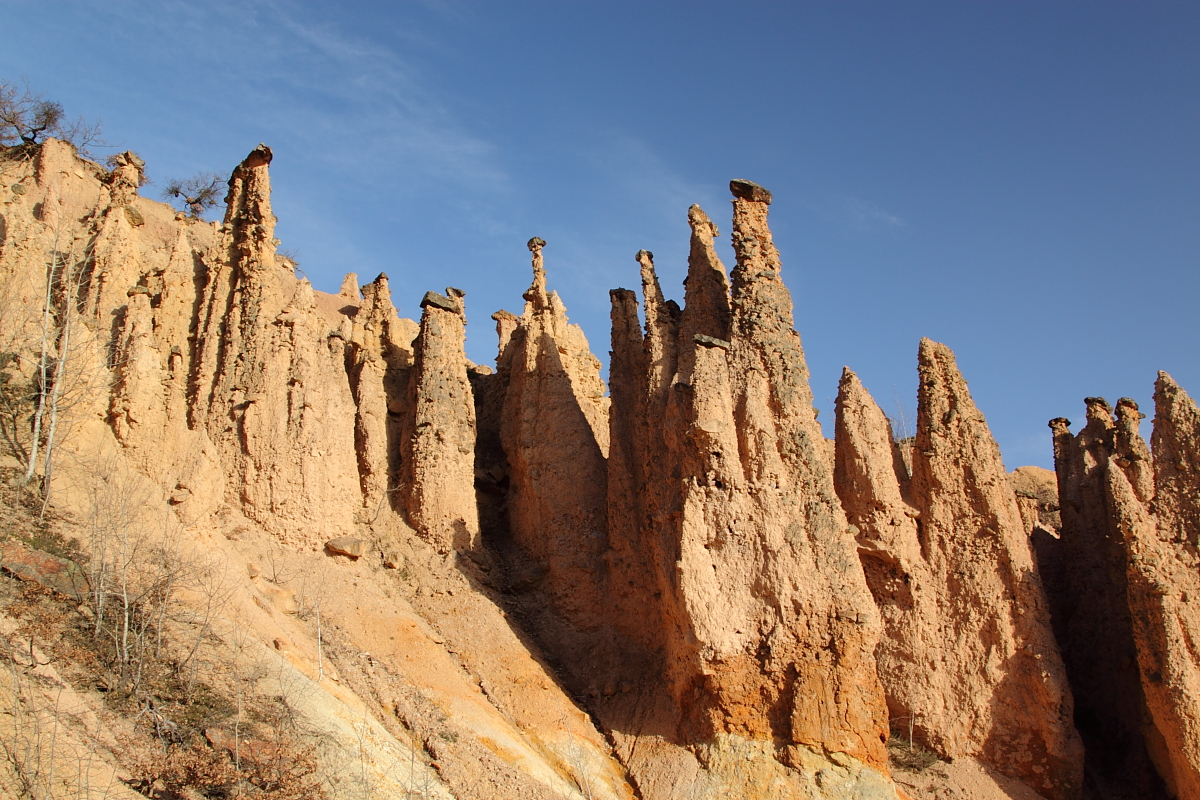
Đavolja Varoš

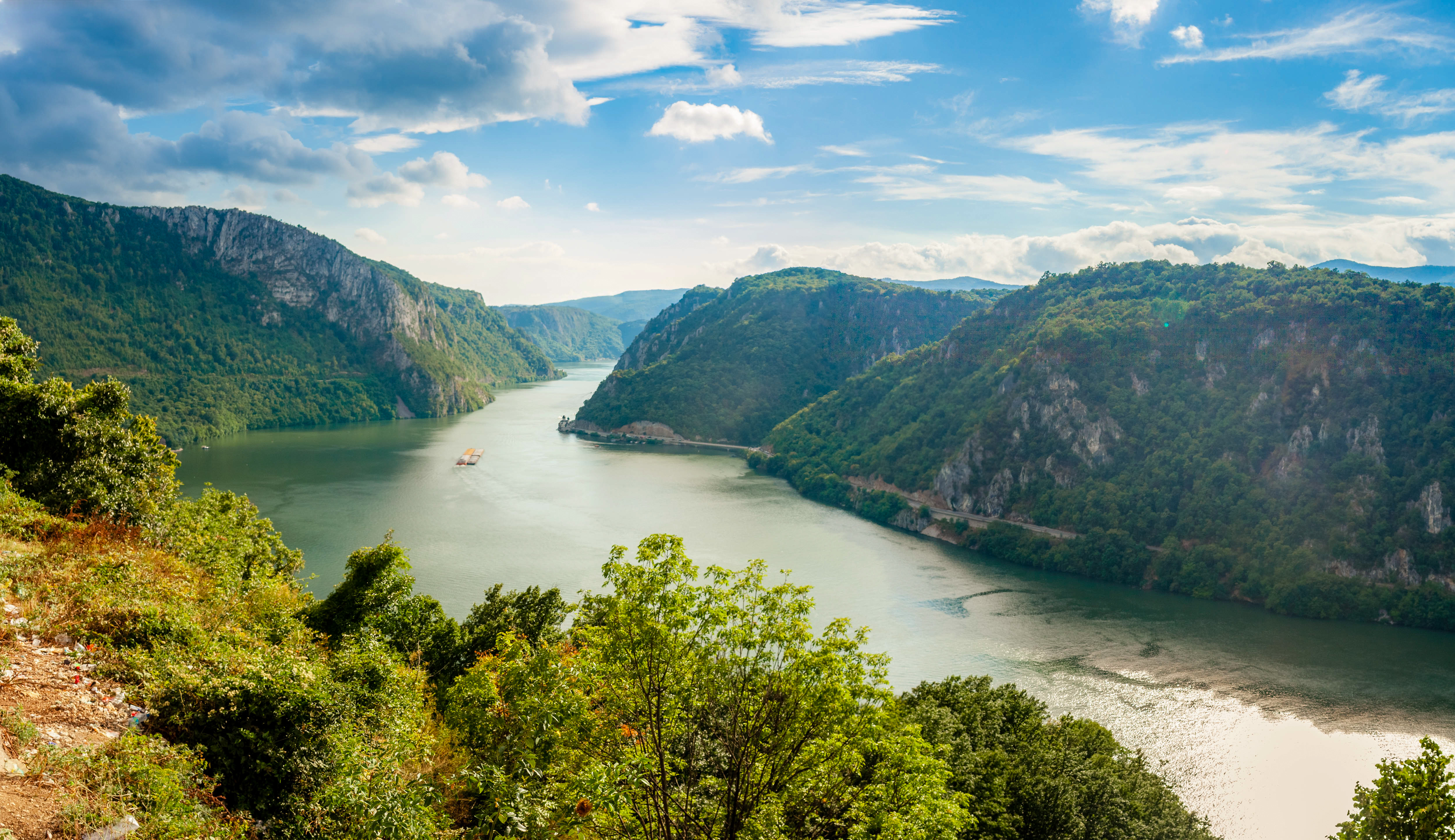
Đerdap National Park

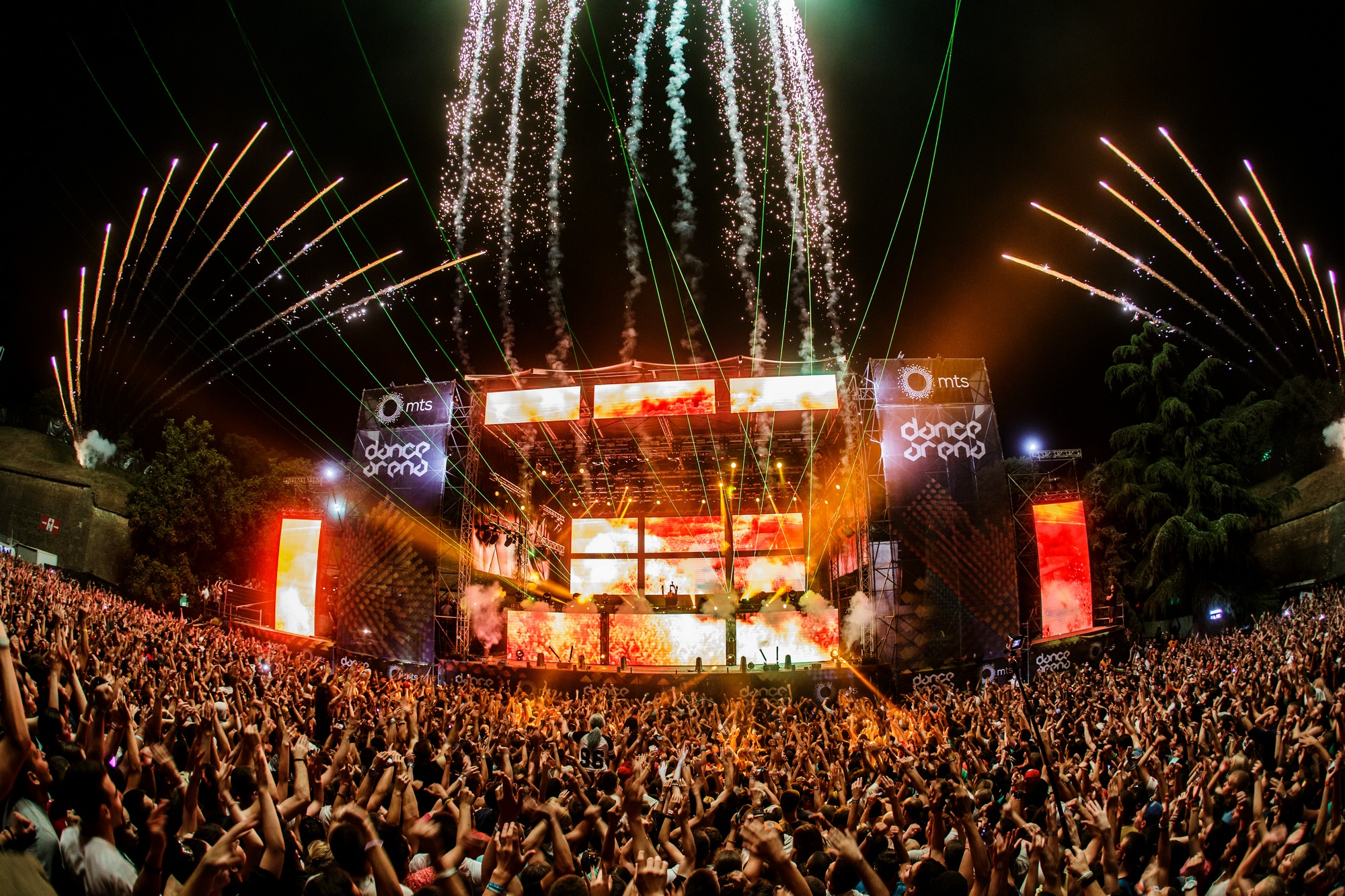
EXIT Music Festival

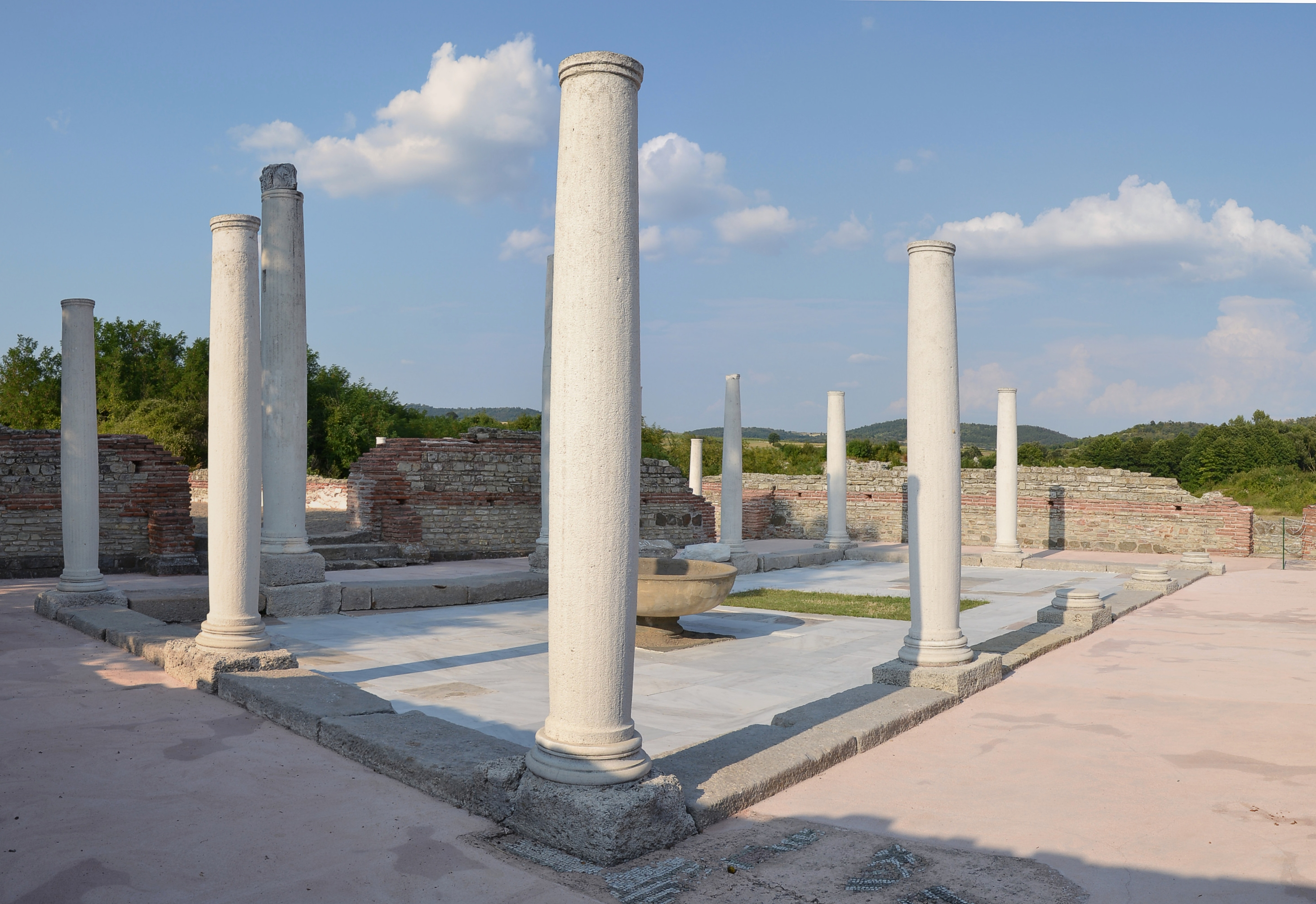
Felix Romuliana

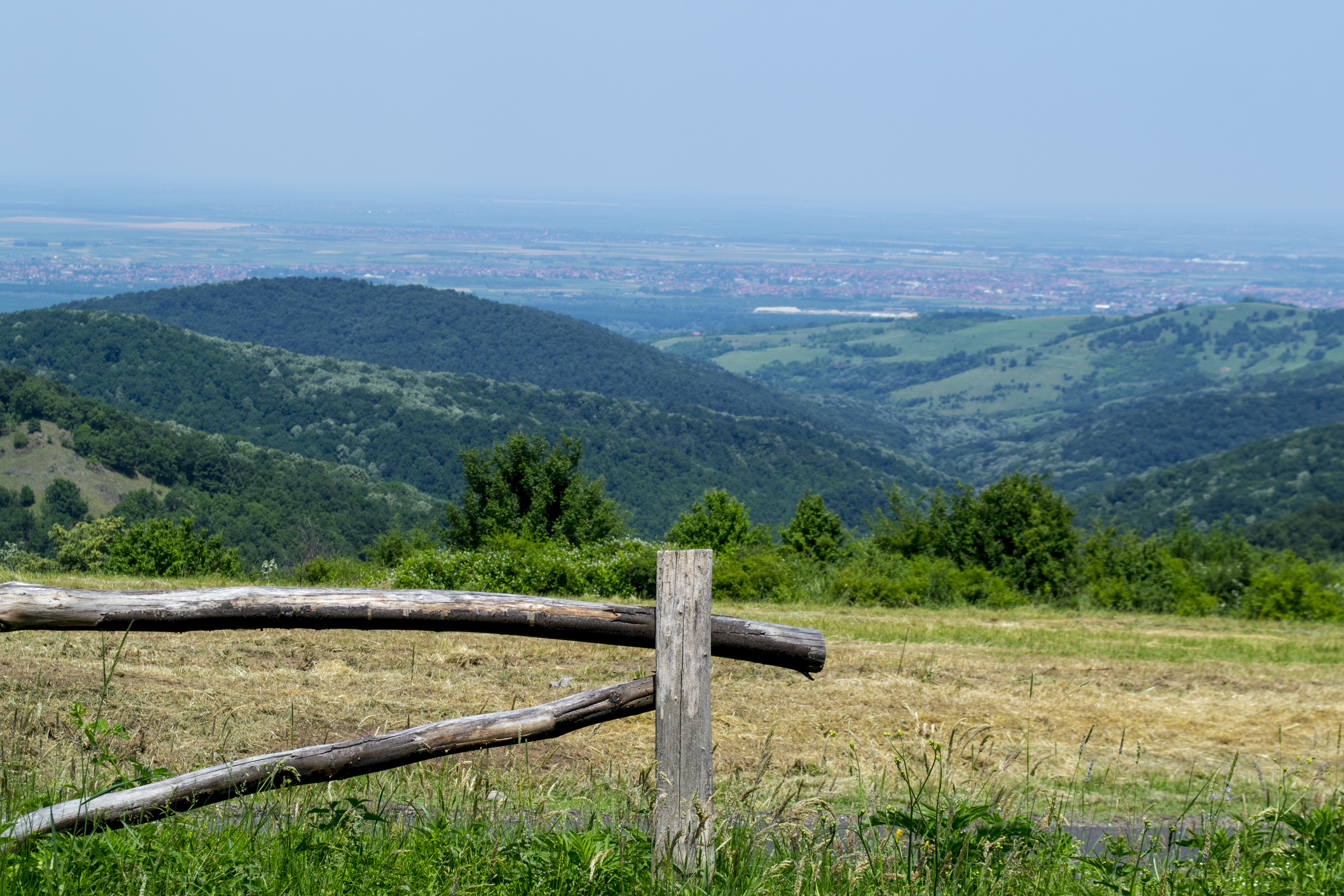
Fruška Gora National Park

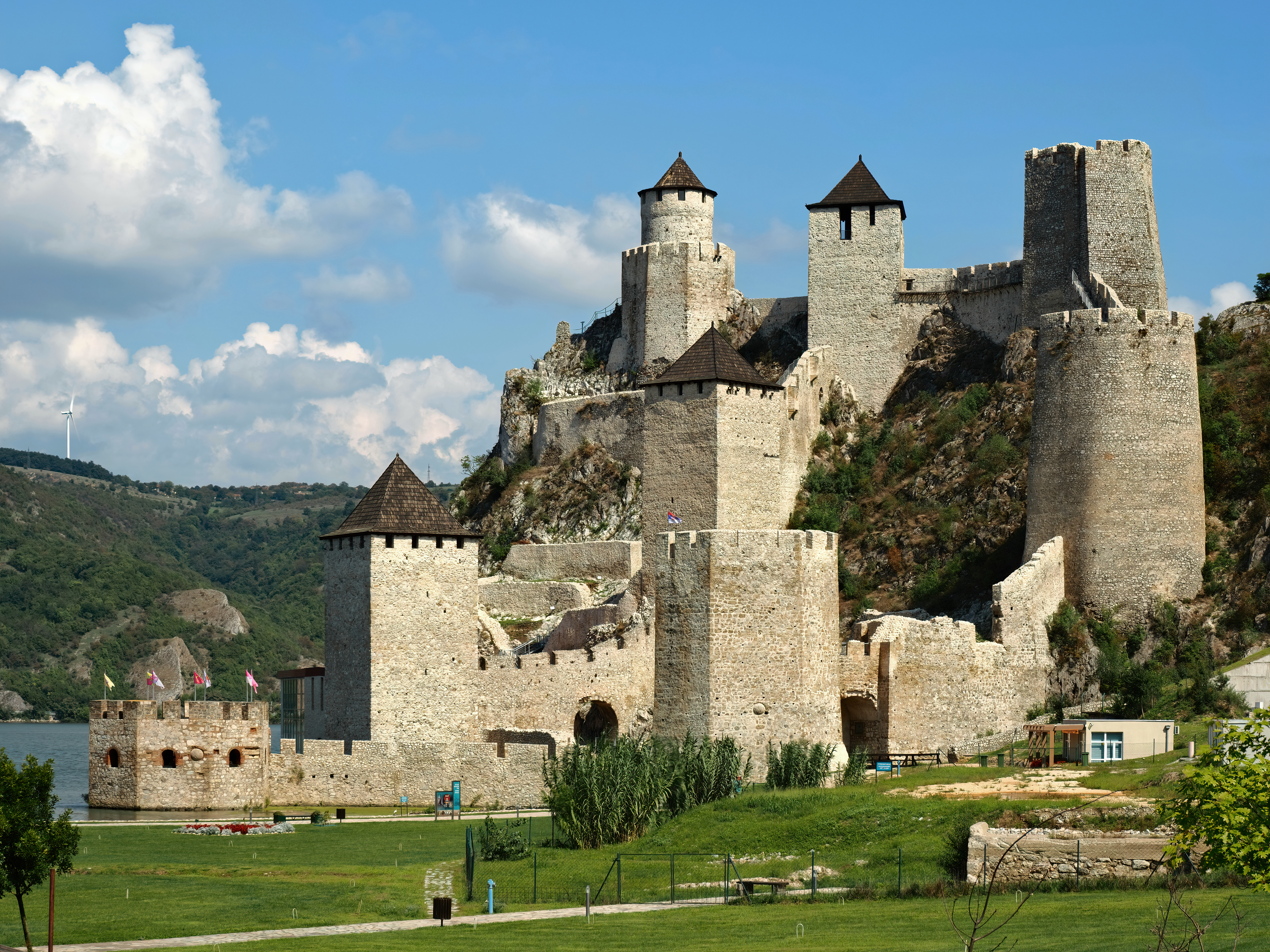
Golubac Fortress

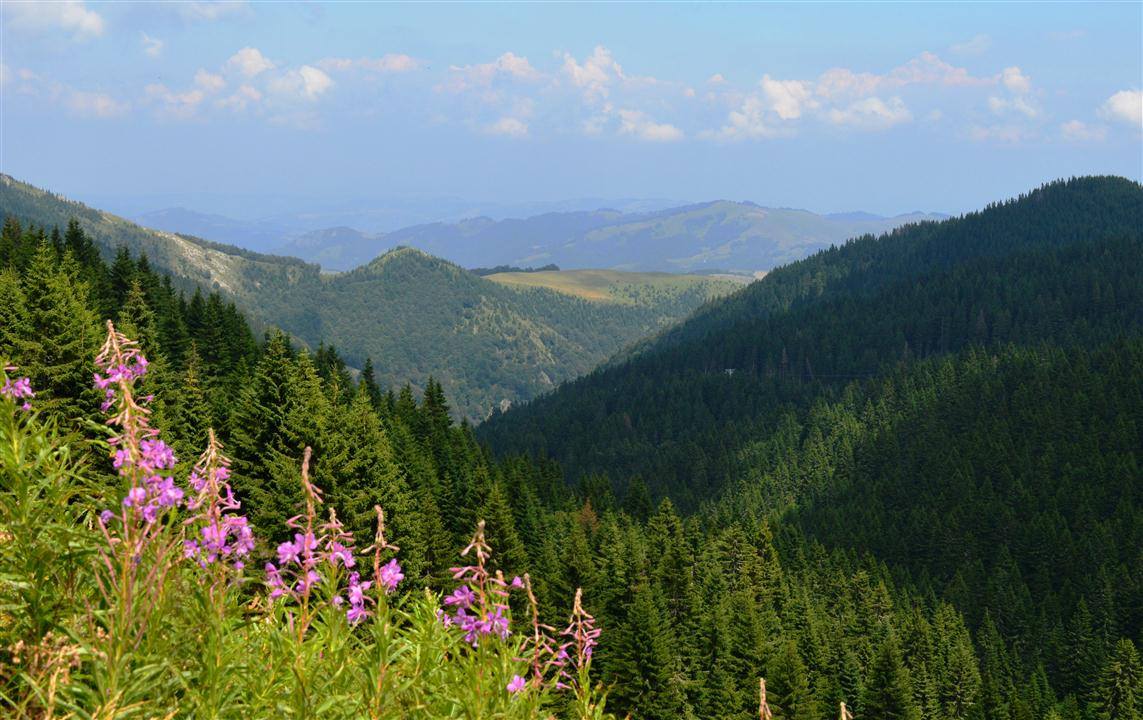
Kopaonik National Park

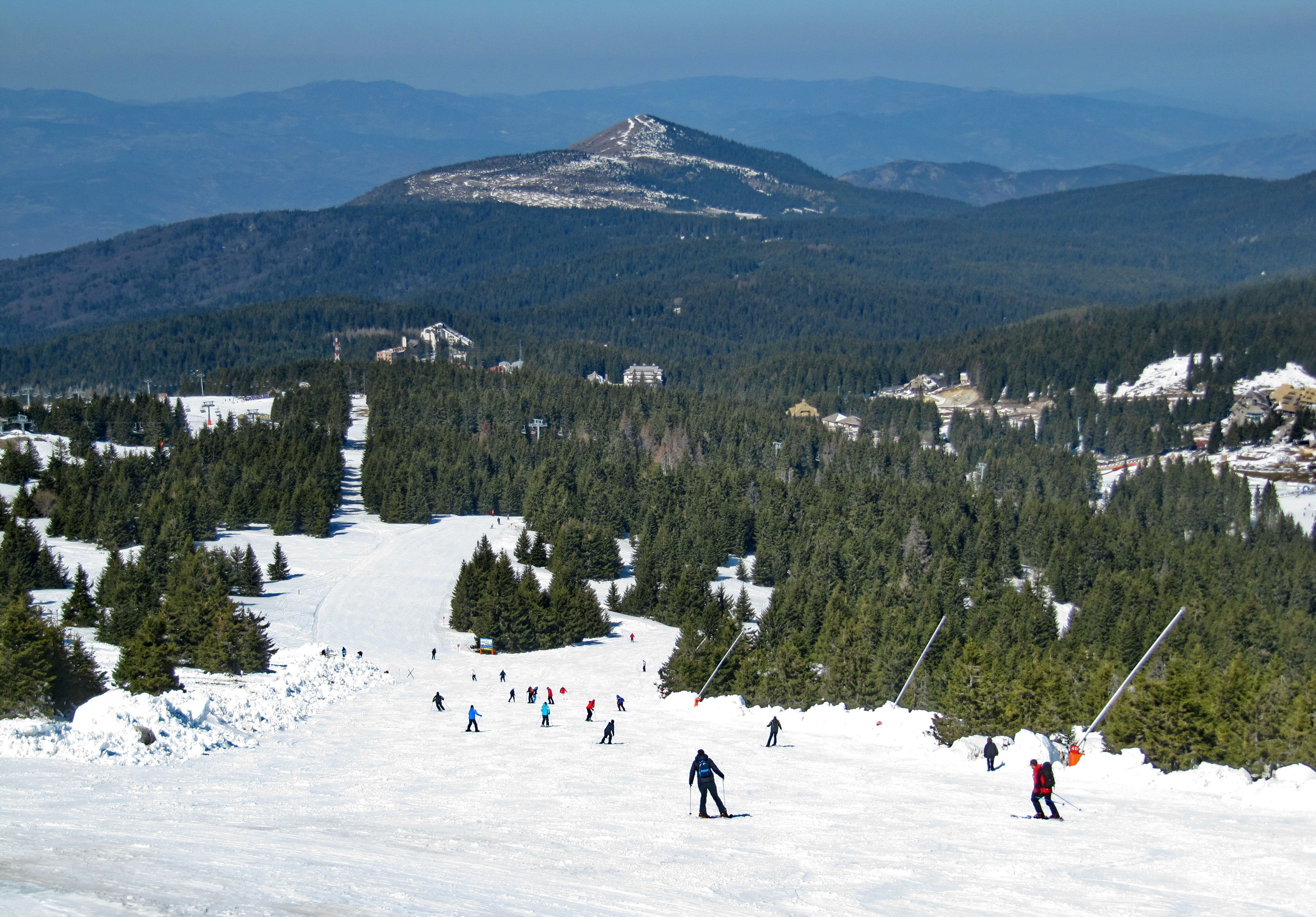
Kopaonik Ski Center

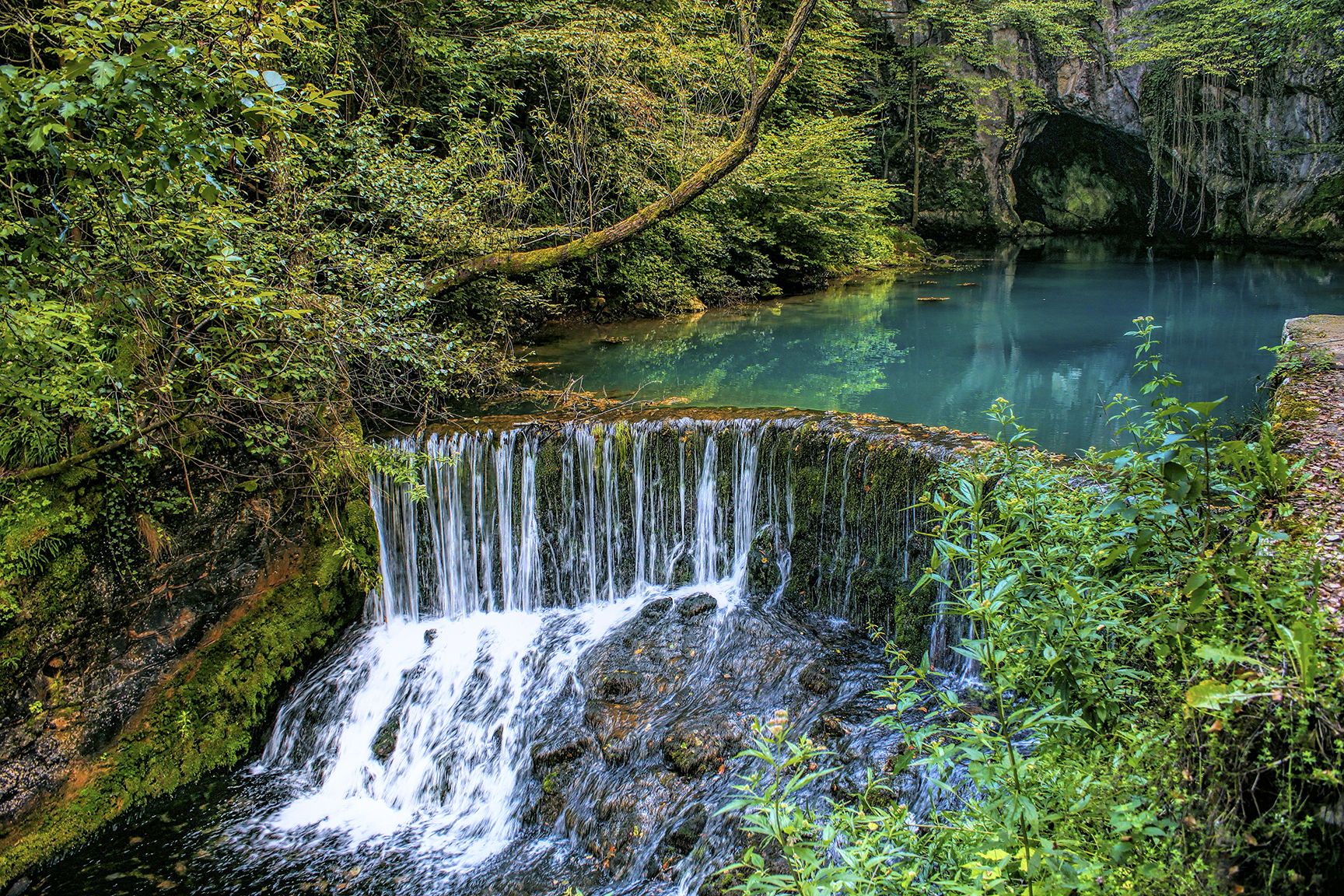
Krupaj Spring

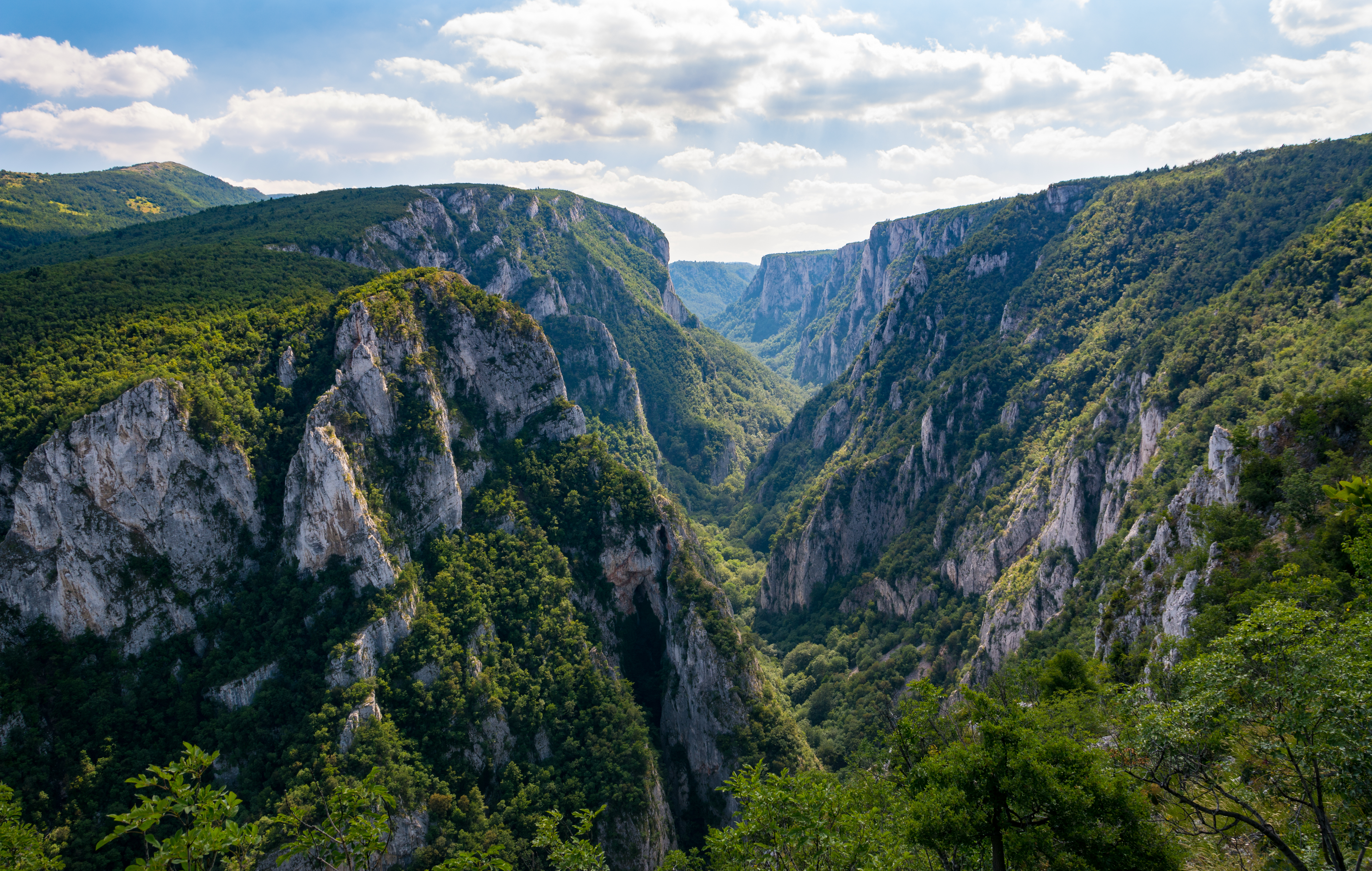
Lazar's Canyon

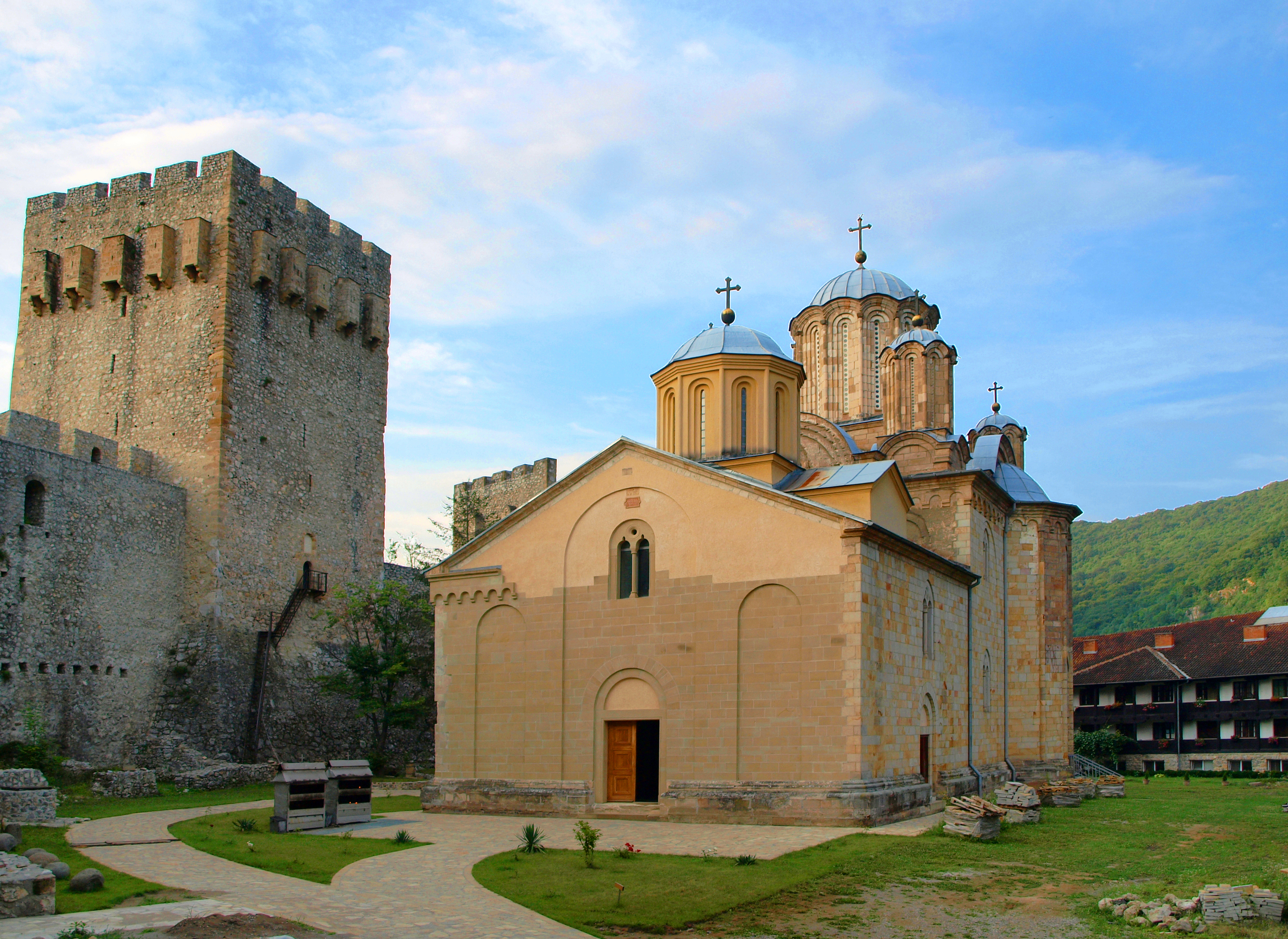
Manasija Monastery

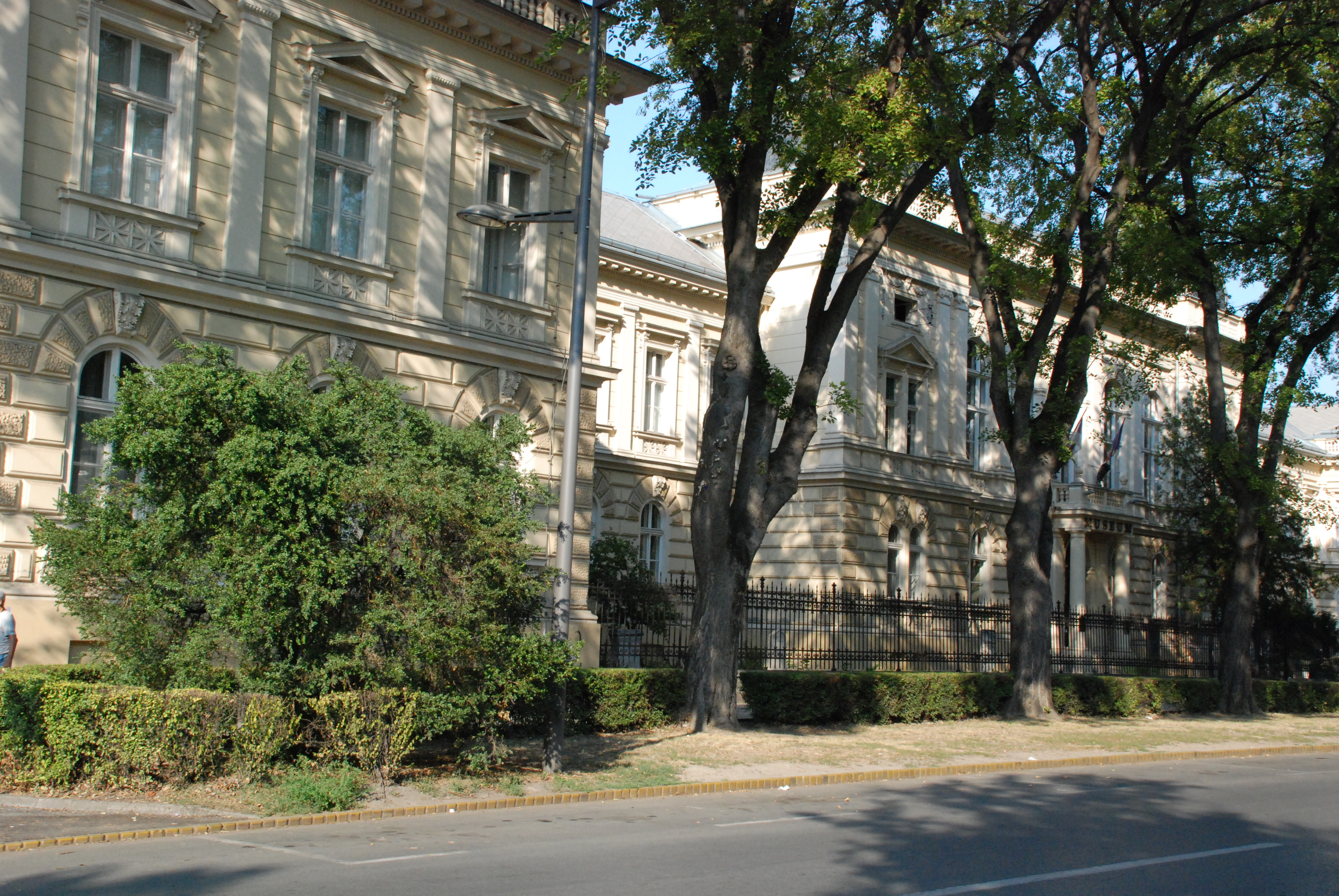
Museum of Vojvodina

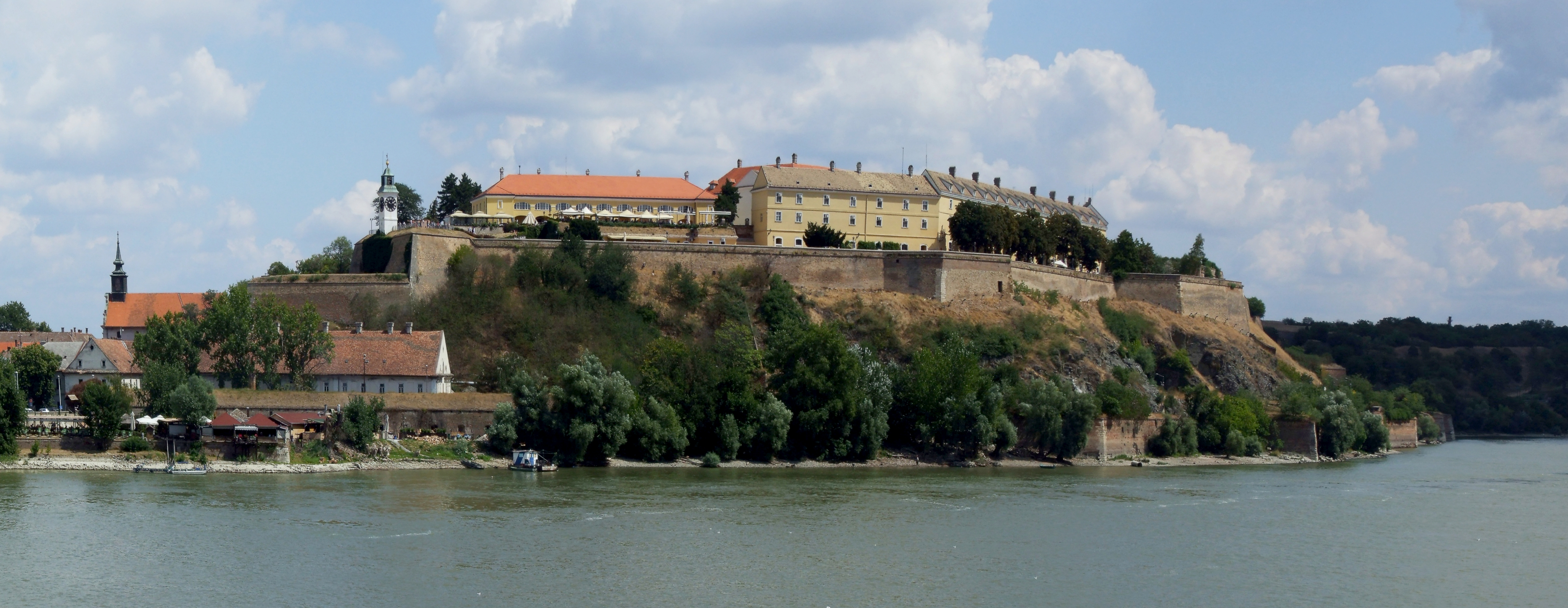
Petrovaradin Fortress

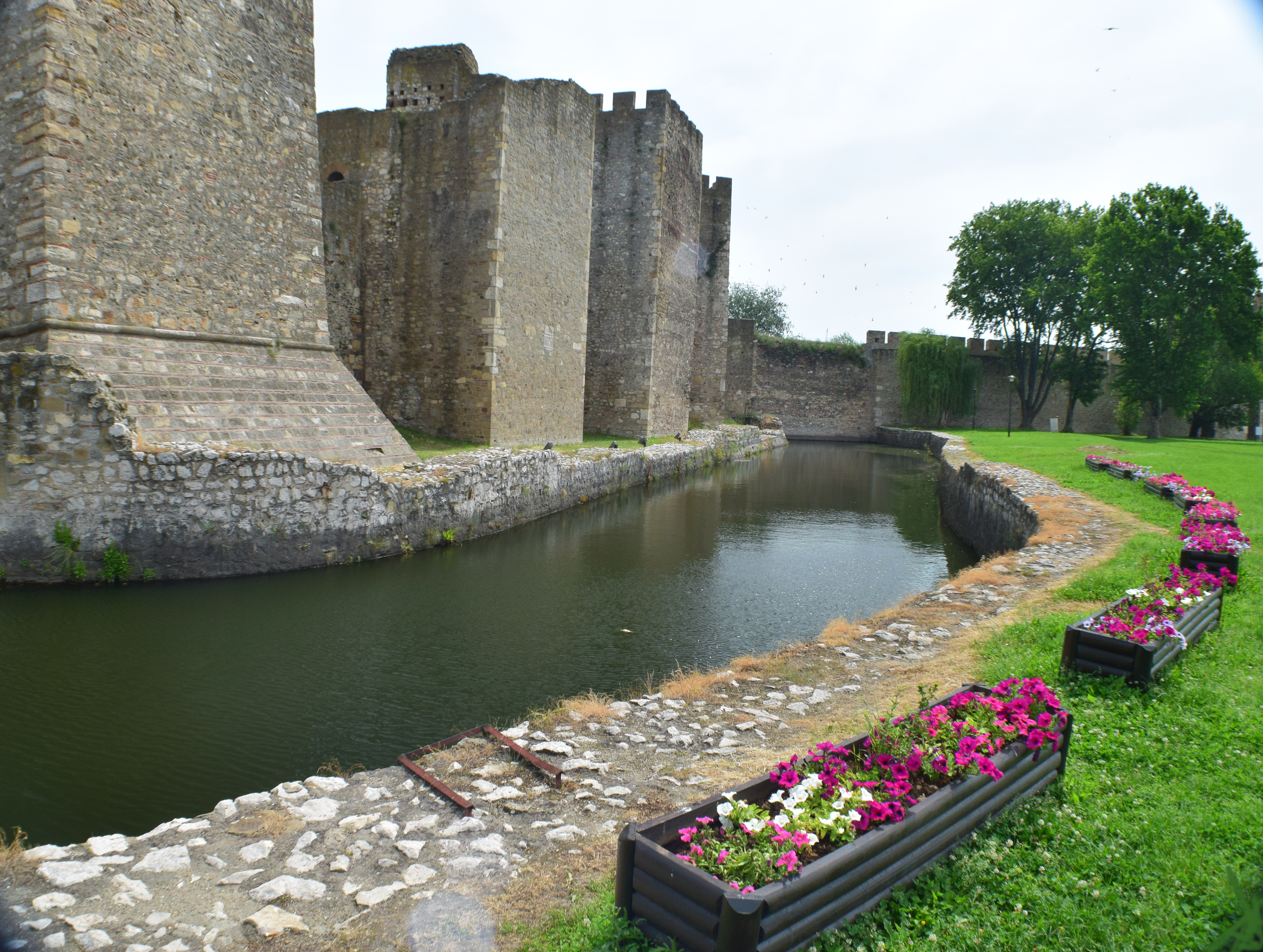
Smederevo Fortress

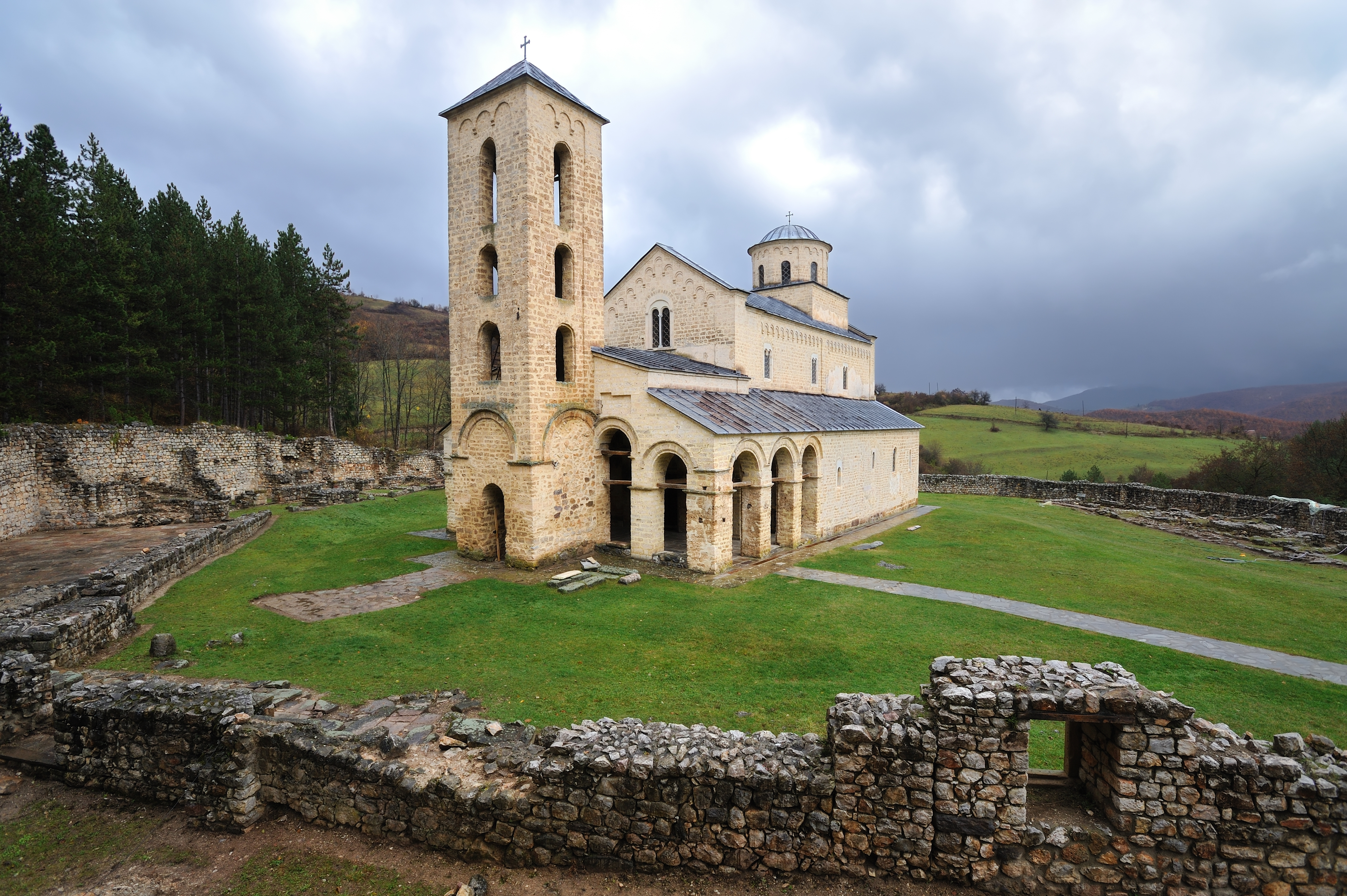
Sopoćani Monastery

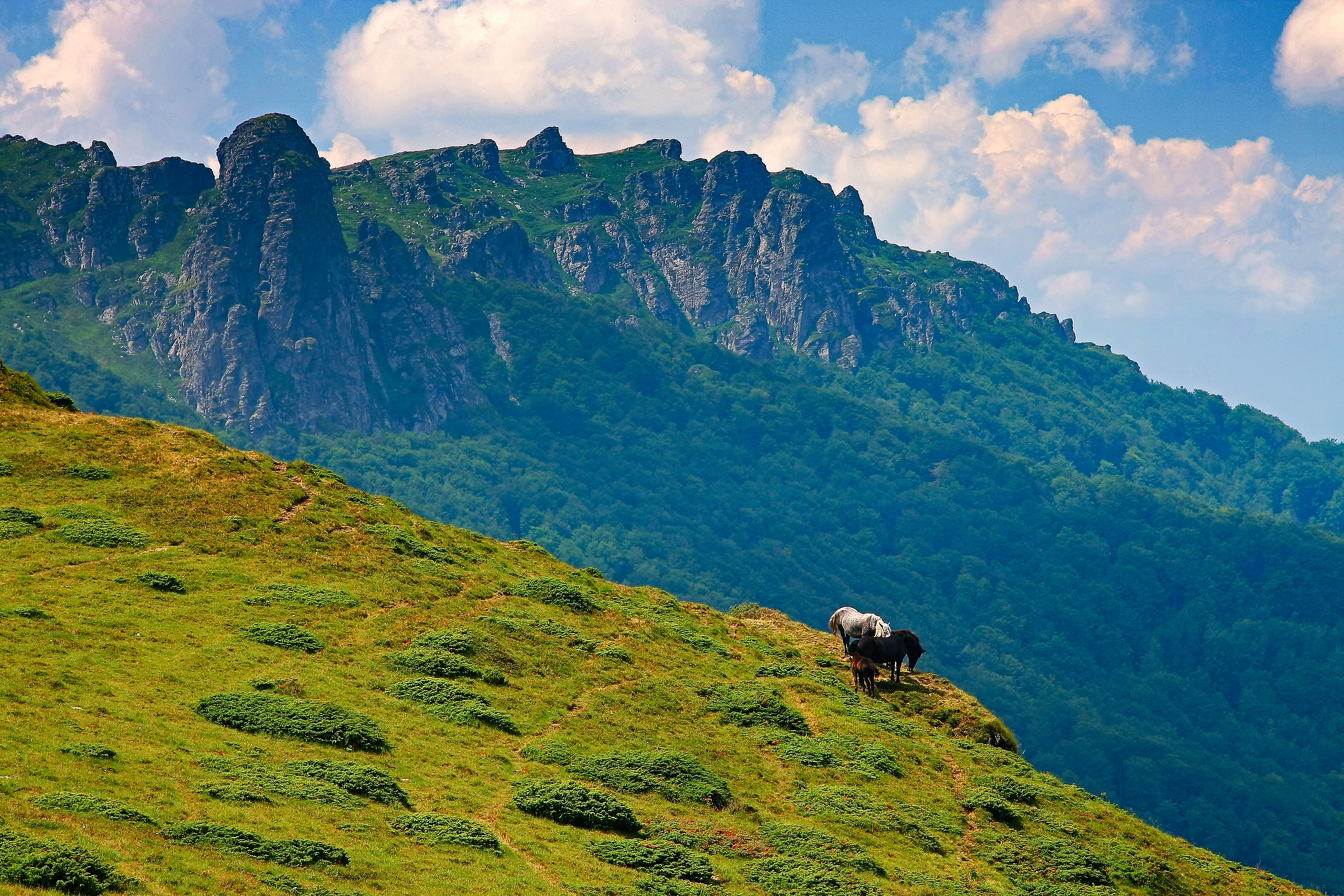
Stara Planina Nature Park

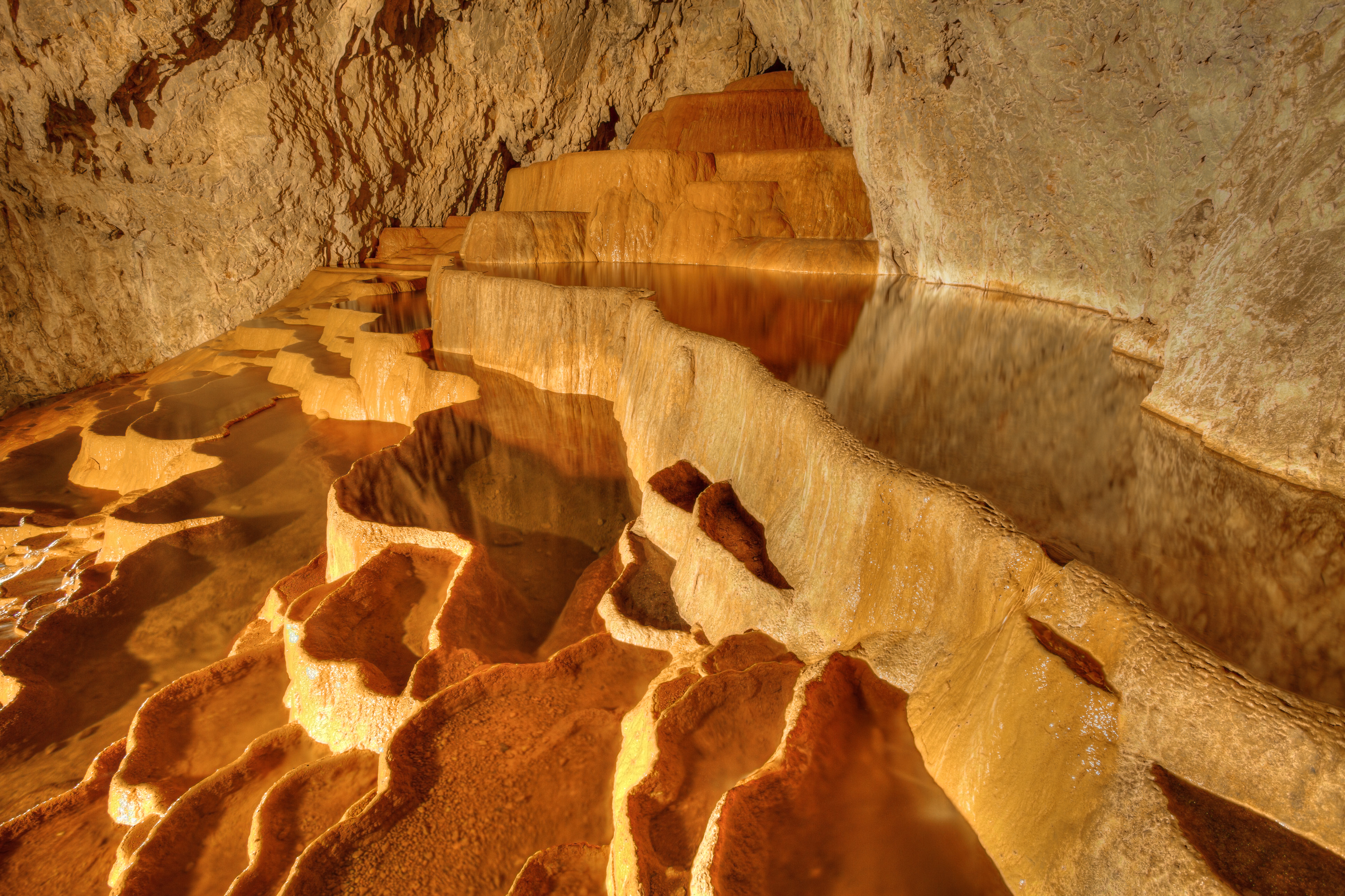
Stopića Cave

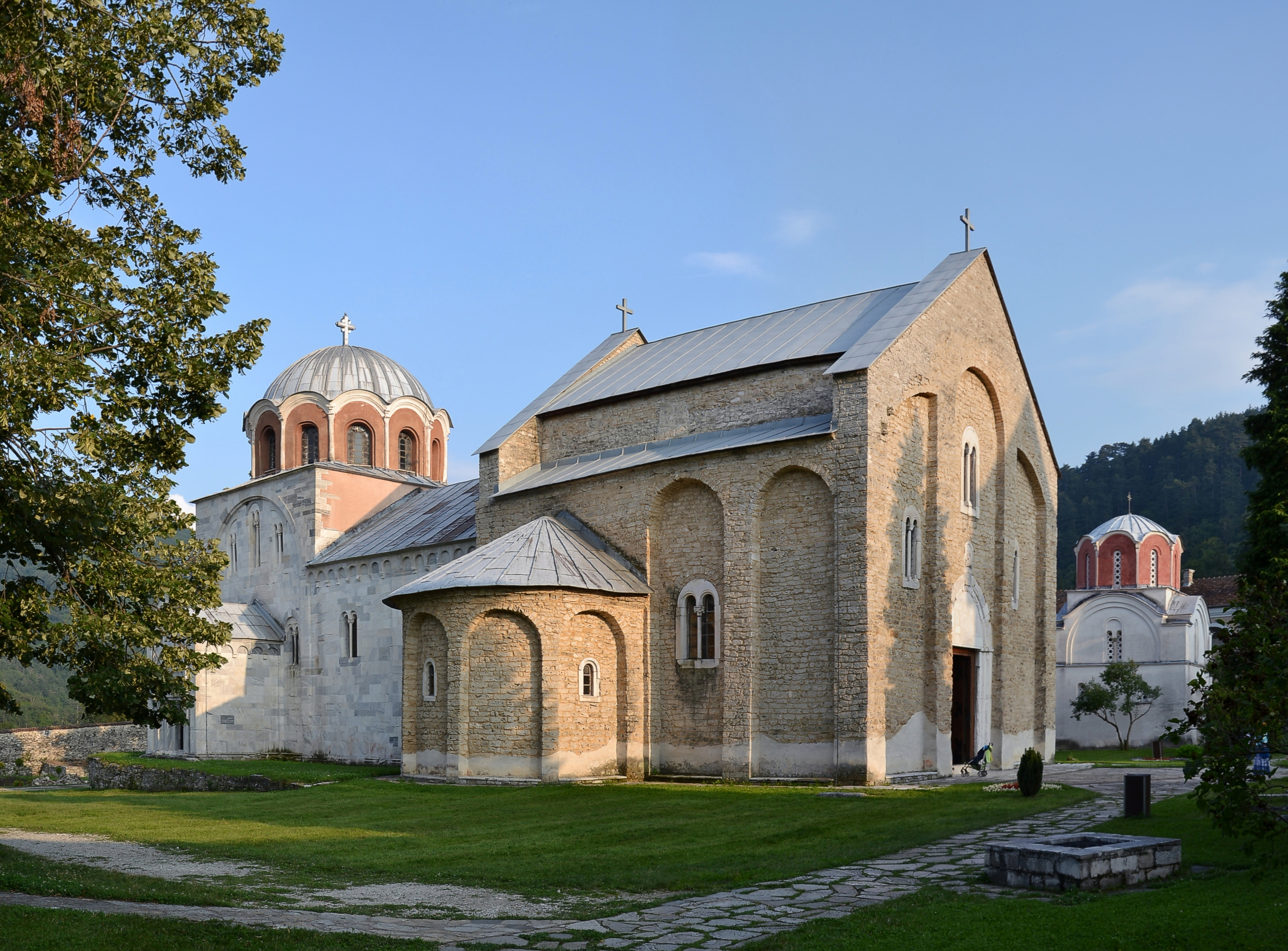
Studenica Monastery

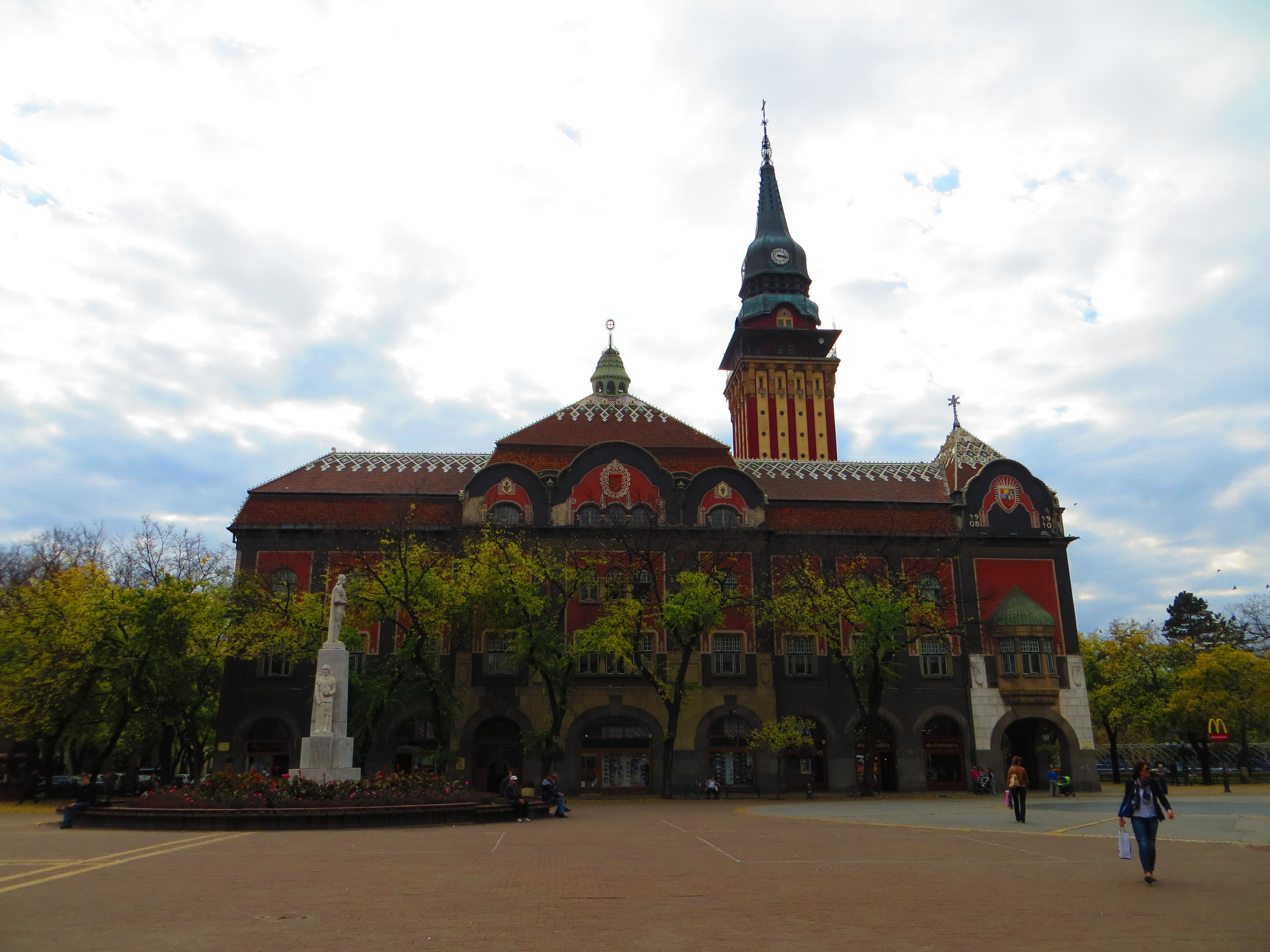
Subotica City Hall

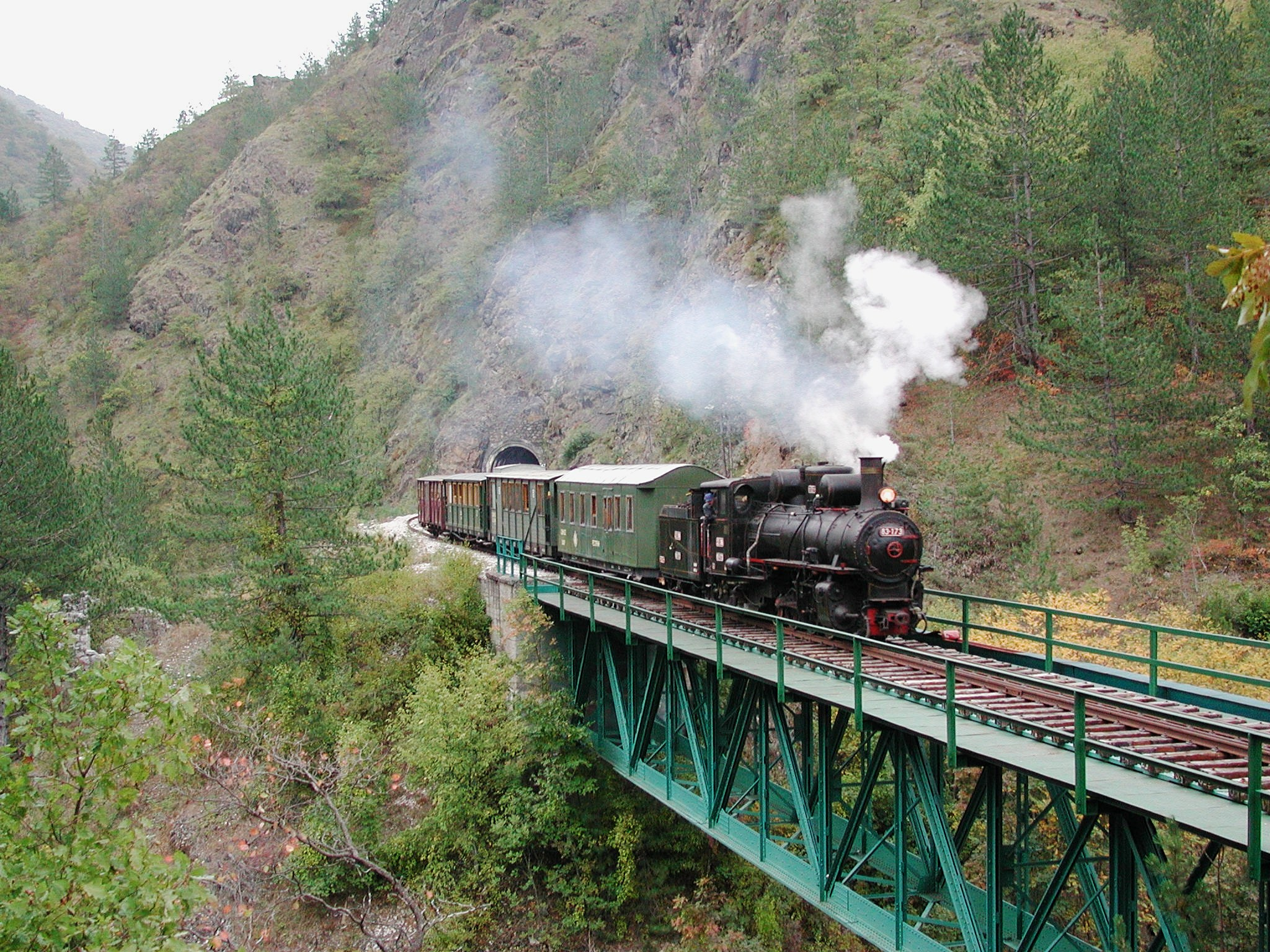
Šargan Eight

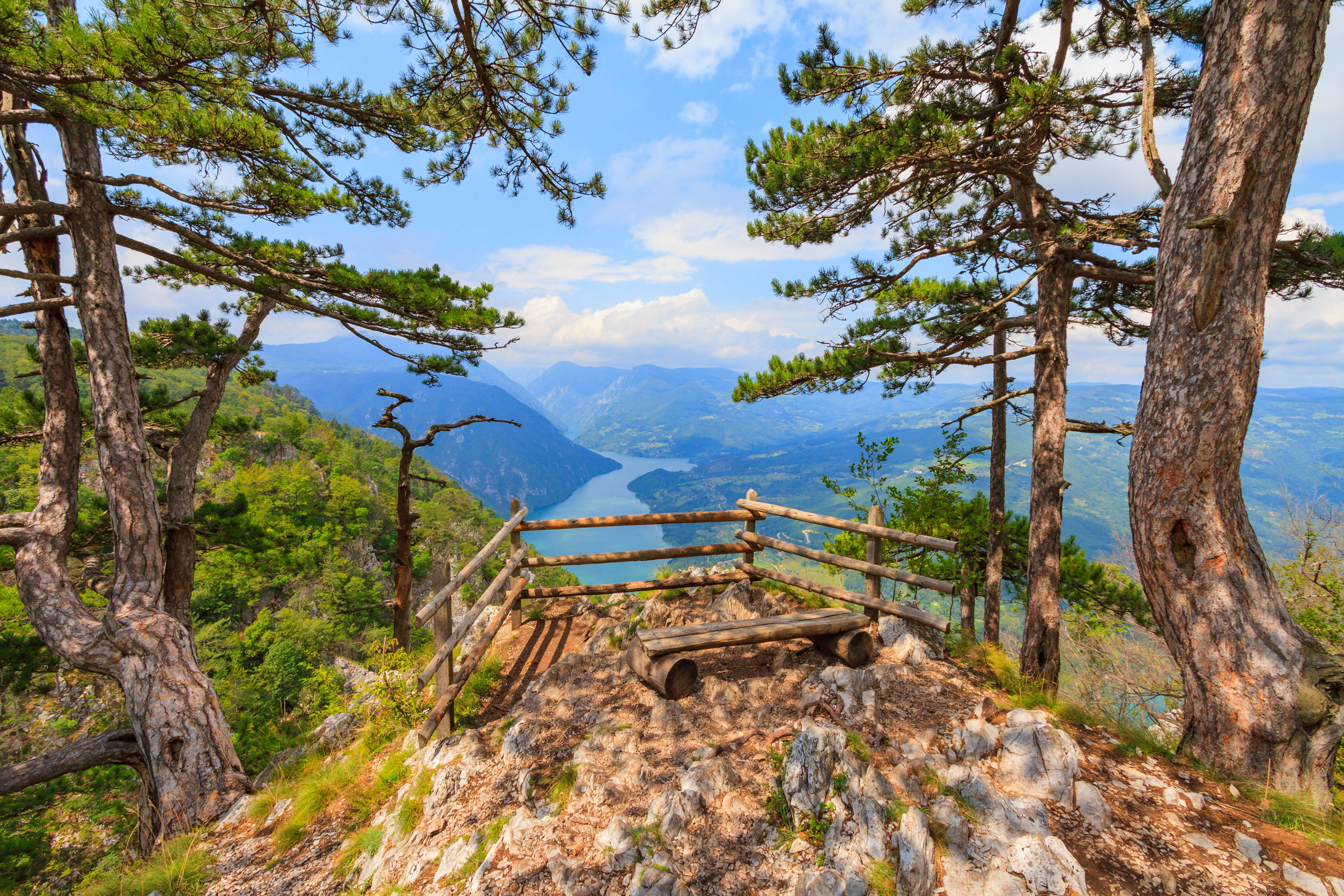
Tara National Park

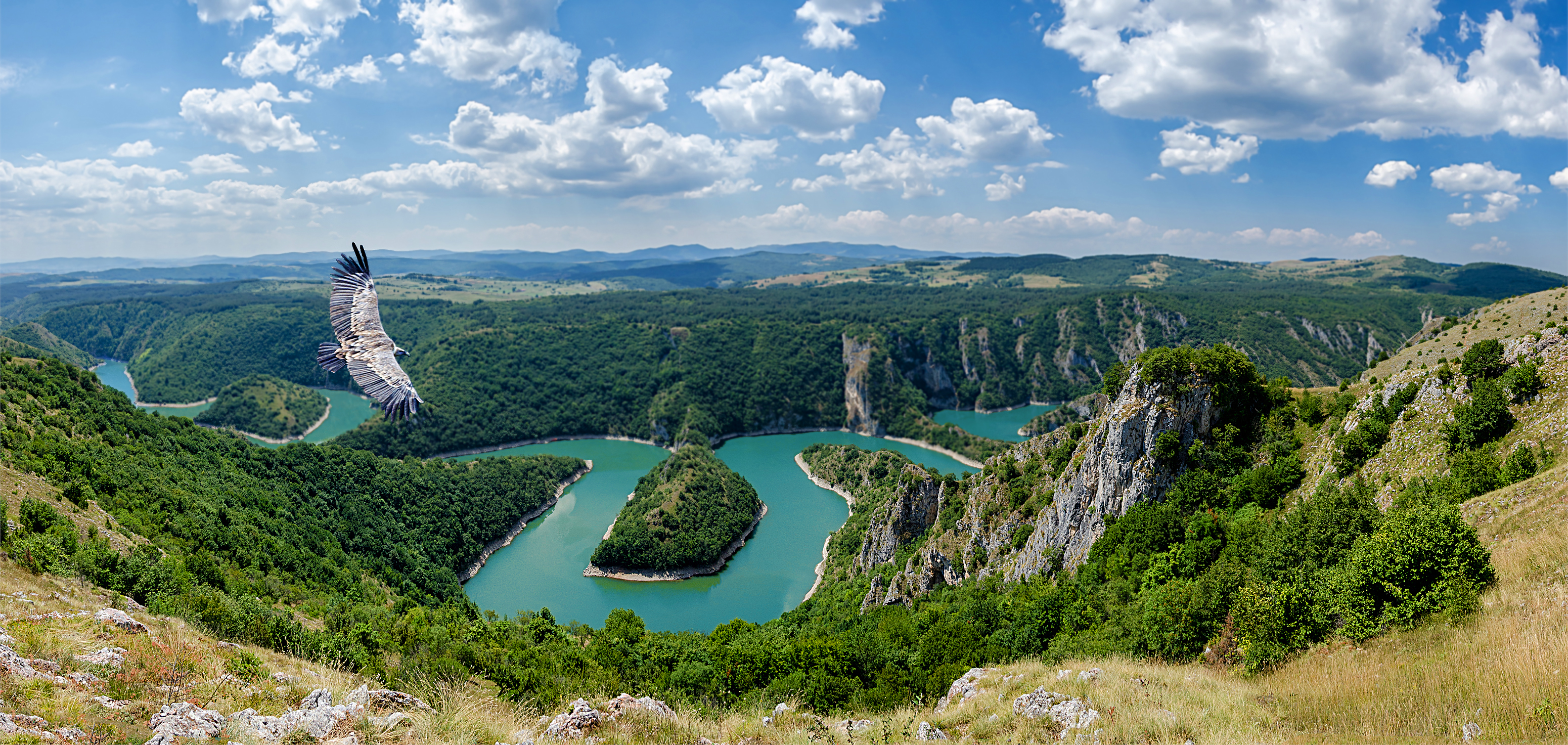
Uvac Canyon

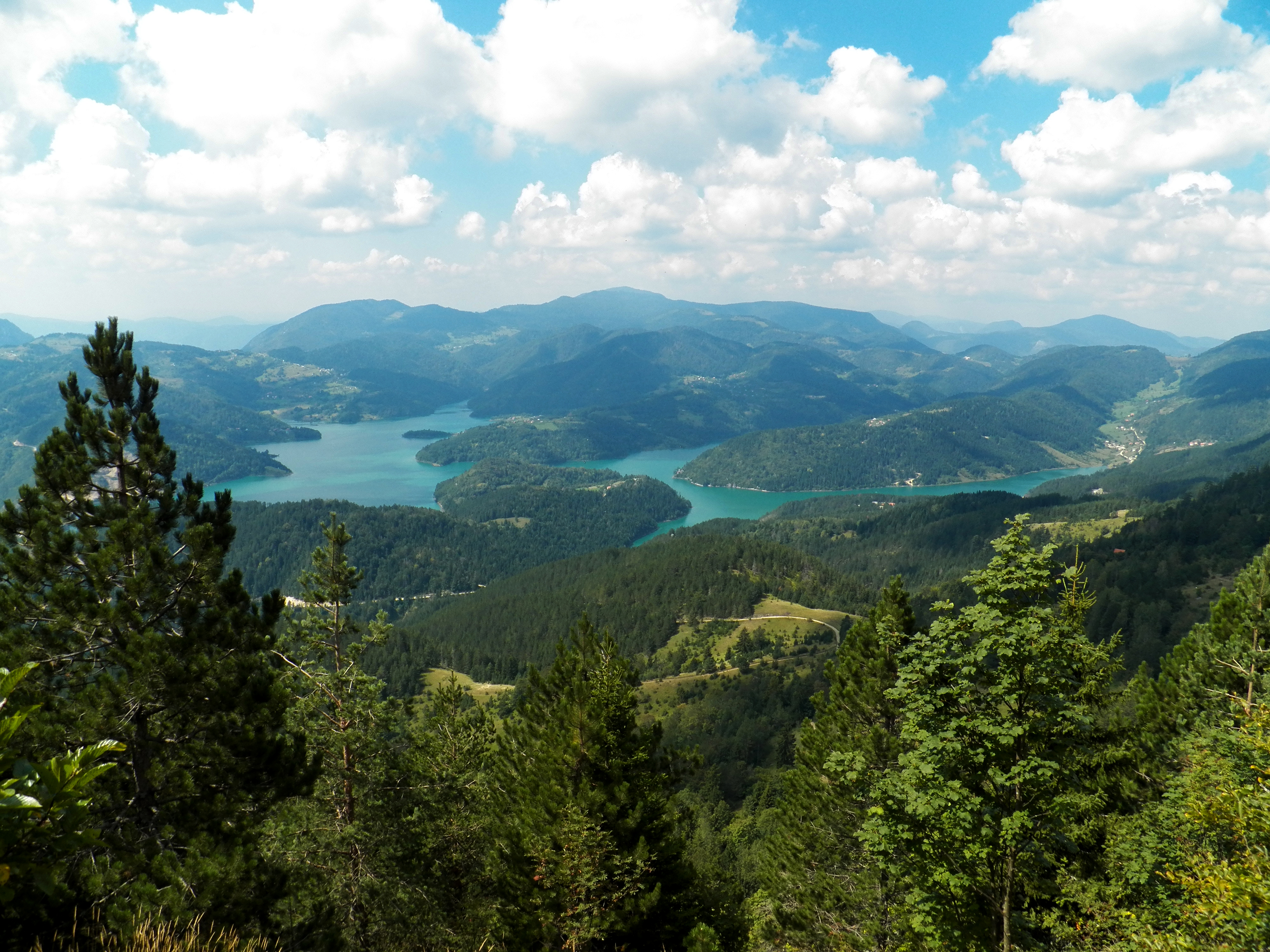
Lake Zaovine

== See also ==
- Visa policy of Serbia
- Tourism in Vojvodina
- Architecture of Serbia
