= Banja =

Banja (Serbian: Бања), which in Serbo-Croatian means "spa", may refer to:

- Various toponyms named Banja meaning spa, see
- Banja Monastery, Serbia
- Banja, Aranđelovac, a village near Aranđelovac, Serbia
- Banja (Priboj), a village near Priboj, Serbia
- Banja (Novi Pazar), a village near Novi Pazar, Serbia
- Banja Vrujci, a spa town in west Serbia
- Banja (Fojnica), a village in Bosnia and Herzegovina
- Banja, Mališevo, a village in Kosovo
- Banja, Split-Dalmatia County, a village near Vrgorac, Croatia
- Banja, Dubrovnik-Neretva County, a village near Ploče, Croatia
- Banja, North Macedonia, a village in Češinovo-Obleševo Municipality, North Macedonia
- Banja Luka, the second largest city in Bosnia and Herzegovina

Other

- Banja (woreda), an administrative division of the Amhara Region, Ethiopia
- "Banja", a 2021 song by Ruff Kid

== See also ==
- Banjar (disambiguation)
