= Banjar =

Banjar may refer to:

== People ==
- Banjar people, an ethnic group in Indonesia
- Banjar language, of the Banjar people

== Geography ==
- Banjar City, a city in West Java, Indonesia
- Banjar, Buleleng, a district in Bali province of Indonesia
- Banjar, India, a town in Himachal Pradesh, India
- Banjar Regency, a regency in South Kalimantan province of Indonesia
- Banjar Region, an autonomous area formed in the southeastern part of Indonesian island of Borneo by the Netherlands in 1948
- Sultanate of Banjar, a former sultanate located in modern South Kalimantan Province of Indonesia

== Other uses ==
- Banjar (instrument), a stringed folk instrument, ancestor to the banjo

== See also ==
- Banja (disambiguation)
- Banjara, nomadic people of India
