= Roštiljijada =

Food festival in Leskovac, Serbia

Leskovac Grill Festival Роштиљијада Roštiljijada
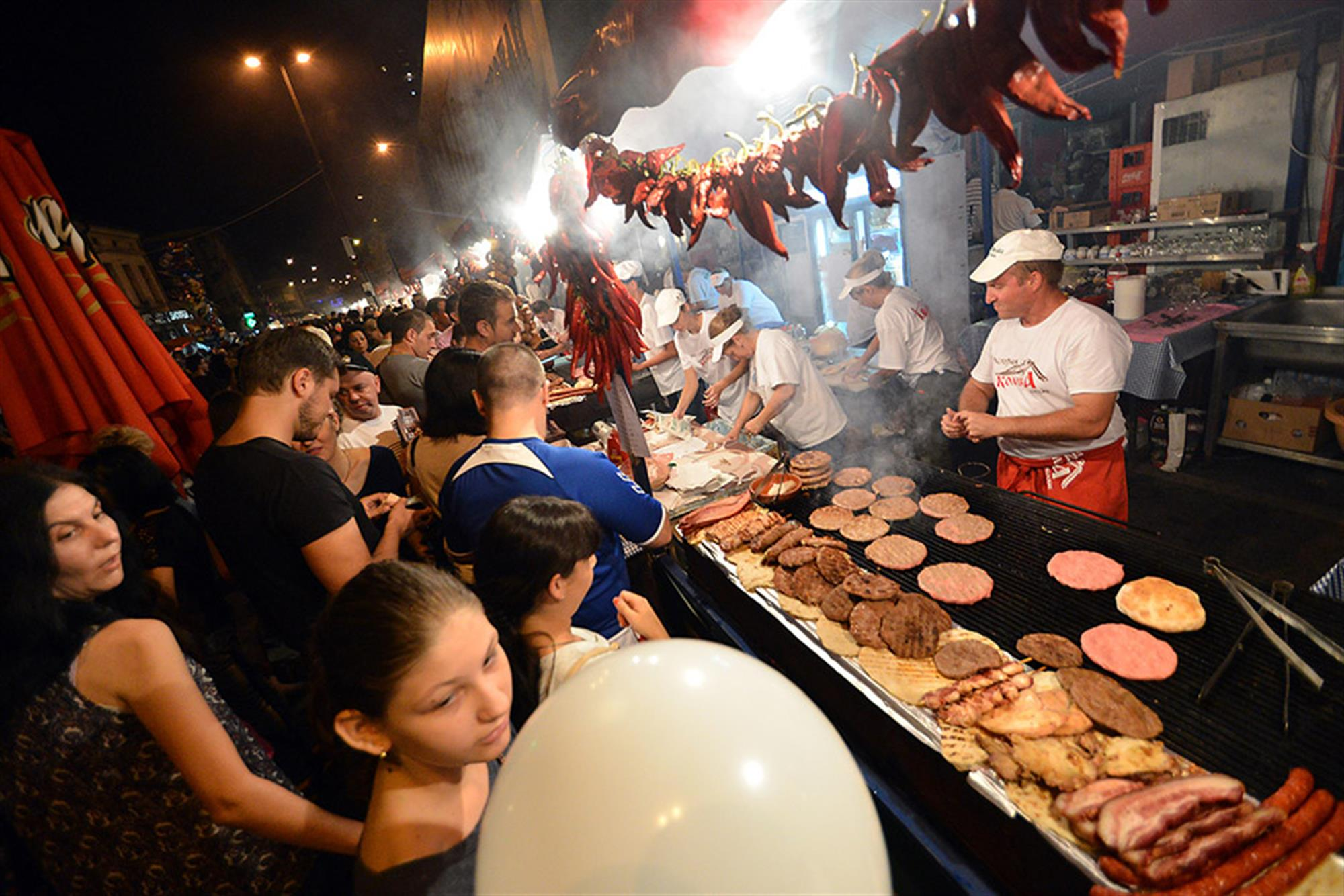
- Locations: Leskovac, Serbia
- Years active: since 1989

Roštiljijada or Leskovac Grill Festival (Serbian: [Лесковачка] Роштиљијада, romanized: [Leskovačka] Roštiljijada; also Роштиљада, Roštiljada) is an annual grilled meat barbecue-based festival organized at the beginning of September in the city of Leskovac, Serbia. During the event, the main thoroughfare is closed for five days, with around 200 grill stands erected to create numerous temporary restaurants. The event attracts many visitors from across Serbia, as well as tourists from abroad (mostly from Bulgaria, North Macedonia, Greece, and Romania). The organizers hold competitions, such as making the world's biggest pljeskavica.

In addition to the food festival, concerts and carnival are organized throughout the event, modeled on the Oktoberfest in Munich. By the number of visitors Roštiljijada is one of the top touristic events in the country with over of 600,000 people visiting festival in 2013.

== World records ==
In 2016, Roštiljijada celebrated a world record in making the world's biggest pljeskavica. The giant burger weighed 63 kilograms (139 lb), was 169 centimetres (67 in) in diameter and 8 centimetres (3.1 in) thick and made by the great grill master Predrag Lazarević. Ljubiša Đorđević previously held the world record for his Pljeskavica (49 kilograms (108 lb) in 2009).

== Gallery ==
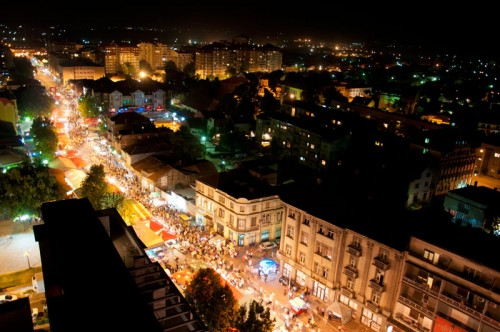
Nightview

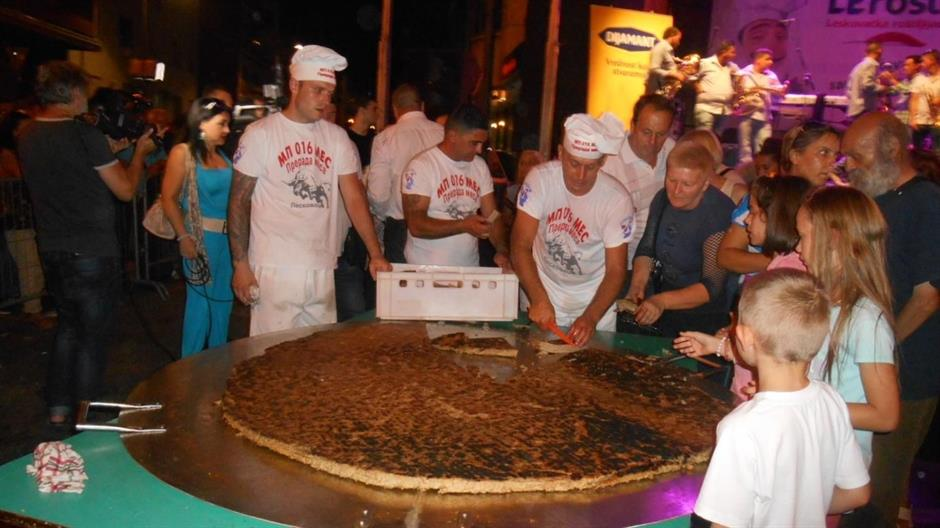
World biggest pljeskavica, 2016

== See also ==
- Tourism in Serbia
