= Banja (Novi Pazar) =

Coordinates: 43°9′N 20°32′E

Novopazarska banja Бања
- Village (Selo)
- Interactive map of Novopazarska banja
- Country: Serbia
- Municipality: Novi Pazar
- Elevation: 1,657 ft (505 m)
- Time zone: UTC+1 (CET)
  - Summer (DST): UTC+2 (CEST)

Novopazarska banja is a spa-village situated in Novi Pazar municipality in Serbia.
