= Krušedol =

Krušedol may refer to:

- Krušedol monastery, a monastery in Srem, Serbia
- Krušedol Selo, a village in Srem, Serbia
- Krušedol Prnjavor, a village in Srem, Serbia
