= Church of St. Theodore Tiron, Irig =

Church of St. Theodore Tiron
- Crkva svetog Teodora Trinona; Црква светог Теодора Тирона
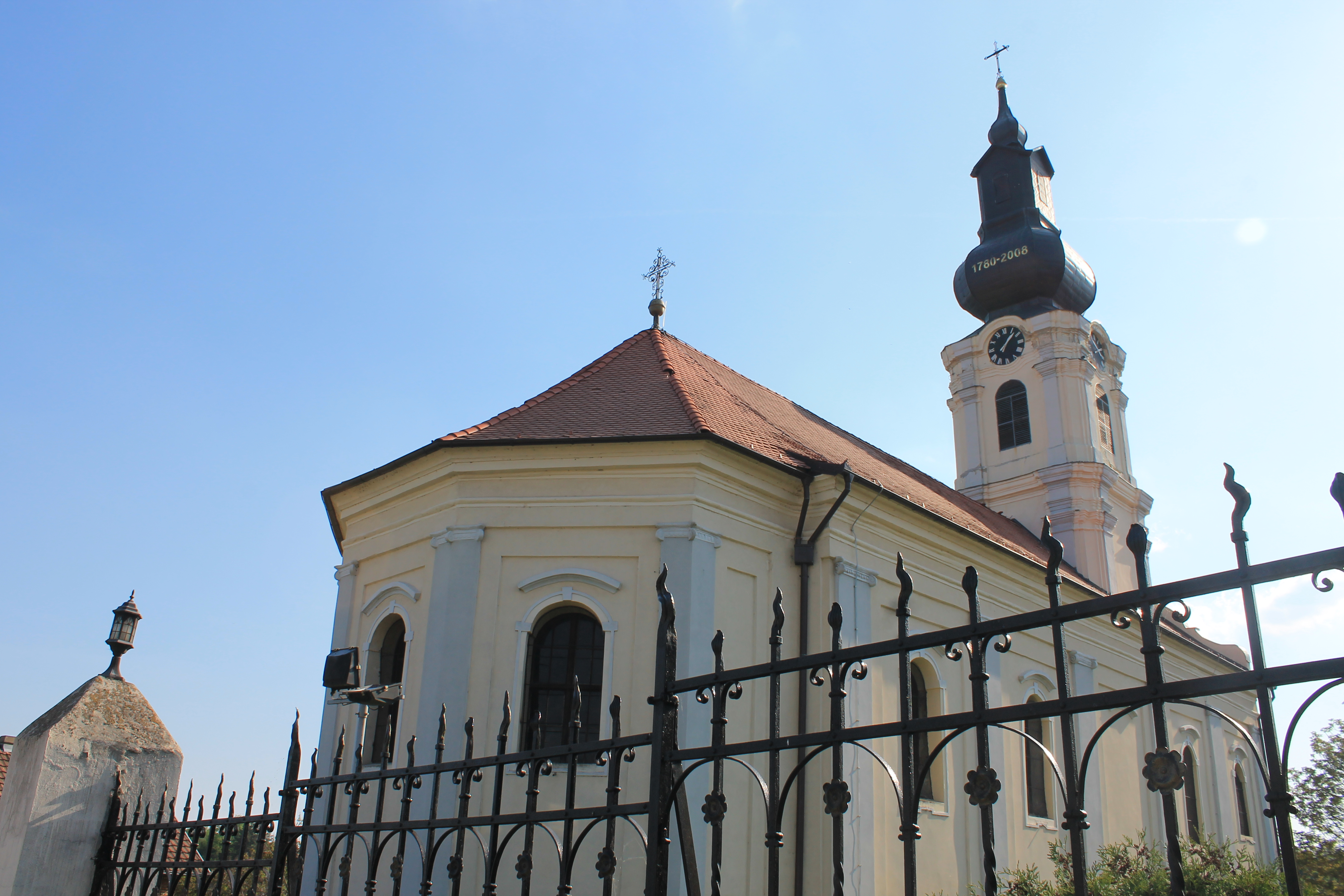
- Church of St. Theodore Tiron

- Shown within Vojvodina/Serbia Church of St. Theodore Tiron (Serbia)
- 45°06′04″N 19°51′30″E
- Location: Irig, Vojvodina

Cultural Heritage of Serbia
- Type: Cultural Monument of Great Importance
- Designated: 1997
- Reference no.: СК 1295
- Country: Serbia
- Denomination: Serbian Orthodox

History
- Status: Church
- Dedication: Theodore Tiron

Architecture
- Functional status: Active
- Style: Neo-classicism
- Years built: 1780

Administration
- Archdiocese: Eparchy of Srem

The Church of St. Theodore Tiron (Serbian: Црква светог Теодора Тирона) in Irig is Serbian Orthodox church in Vojvodina, Serbia. It is one of three Serbian Orthodox churches in Irig. The building represents a typical example of Serbian Orthodox place of worship from that time built on the territory of the Austrian Empire. It was built at the site of an older church from 1679. The iconostasis was made by Jovan Klajić in 1863 and 1864.

== See also ==
- Eparchy of Srem
- Church of the Dormition of the Theotokos, Irig
- Church of St. Nicholas, Irig
