= Church of the Dormition of the Theotokos, Irig =

Church in Irig, Vojvodina, Serbia

Church of the Dormition of the Theotokos
- Црква Успења Пресвете Богородице
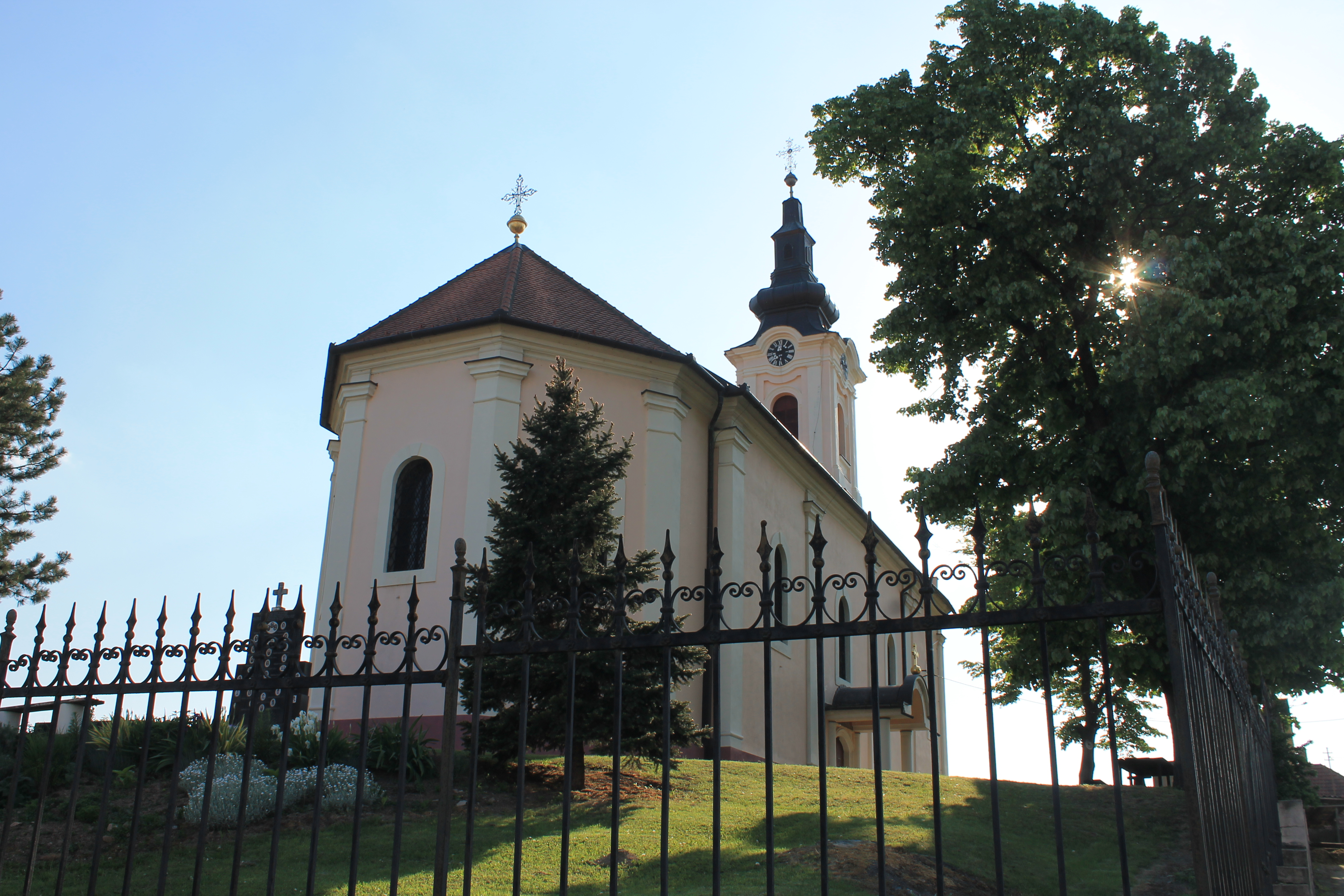
- Church of the Dormition of the Theotokos

- Location within Vojvodina Location within Serbia
- 45°06′04″N 19°51′30″E
- Location: Irig, Vojvodina

Cultural Heritage of Serbia
- Type: Cultural Monument of Great Importance
- Designated: 1997
- Reference no.: СК 1293
- Country: Serbia
- Denomination: Serbian Orthodox

History
- Status: Church
- Dedication: Dormition of the Theotokos

Architecture
- Functional status: Active
- Years built: 1760

Administration
- Archdiocese: Eparchy of Srem

The Church of the Dormition of the Theotokos (Serbian: Црква Успења Пресвете Богородице) is a Serbian Orthodox church in Irig, Vojvodina, Serbia. It is one of three Serbian Orthodox churches in the Municipality of Irig. It is listed as an Immovable Cultural Monument of Great Importance. The church was built between 1757 and 1760. The new bell tower was built in 1837.

== See also ==
- Eparchy of Srem
- Church of St. Nicholas, Irig
- Church of St. Theodore Tiron, Irig
