= Church of St. Nicholas, Irig =

Church of St. Nicholas
- Crkva svetog Nikole; Црква светог Николе
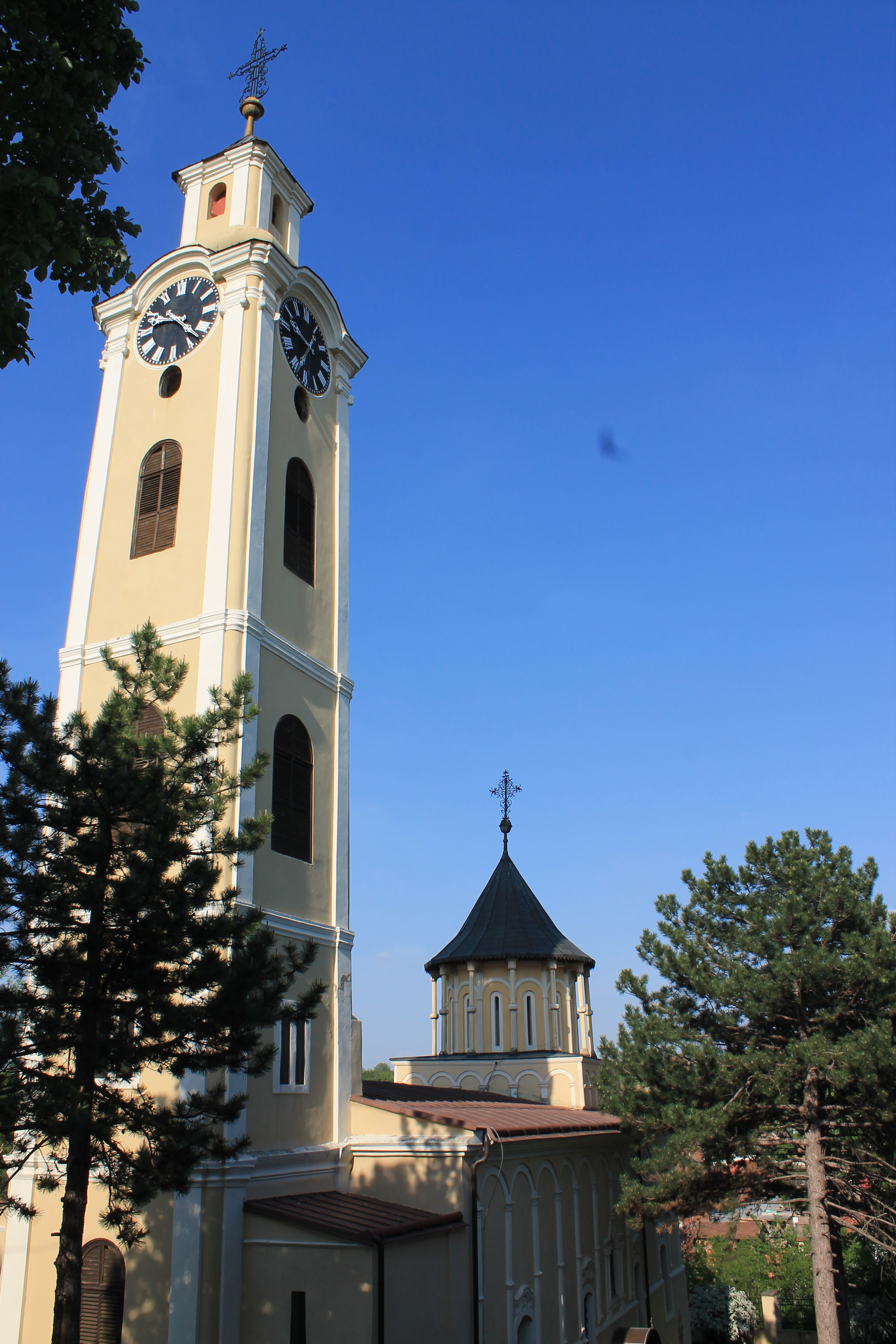
- Church of St Nicholas

- Shown within Vojvodina/Serbia Church of St. Nicholas (Serbia)
- 45°06′04″N 19°51′30″E
- Location: Irig, Vojvodina

Cultural Heritage of Serbia
- Type: Cultural Monument of Great Importance
- Designated: 30 December 1997
- Reference no.: СК 1132
- Country: Serbia
- Denomination: Serbian Orthodox

History
- Status: Church
- Dedication: St. Nicholas

Architecture
- Functional status: Active
- Style: Neo-classicism
- Years built: 1732

Administration
- Archdiocese: Eparchy of Srem

The Church of St. Nicholas (Serbian: Црква светог Николе) in Irig is Serbian Orthodox church in Vojvodina, Serbia. It is one of three Serbian Orthodox churches in Irig. The Church of St. Nicholas was built in 1732 in the tradition of Serbian medieval architecture combined with baroque elements. It represents a cultural monument of great importance. The building was built as a one-nave temple, vaulted with a semi-circular vault, has a dome over the central part supported by four free columns and a five-sided apse. The iconostasis originates from 1760s and it was reconstructed in 1827.

== See also ==
- Eparchy of Srem
- Church of the Dormition of the Theotokos, Irig
- Church of St. Theodore Tiron, Irig
