= Rivica =

Rivica Ривица (Serbian)
- Village (Selo)
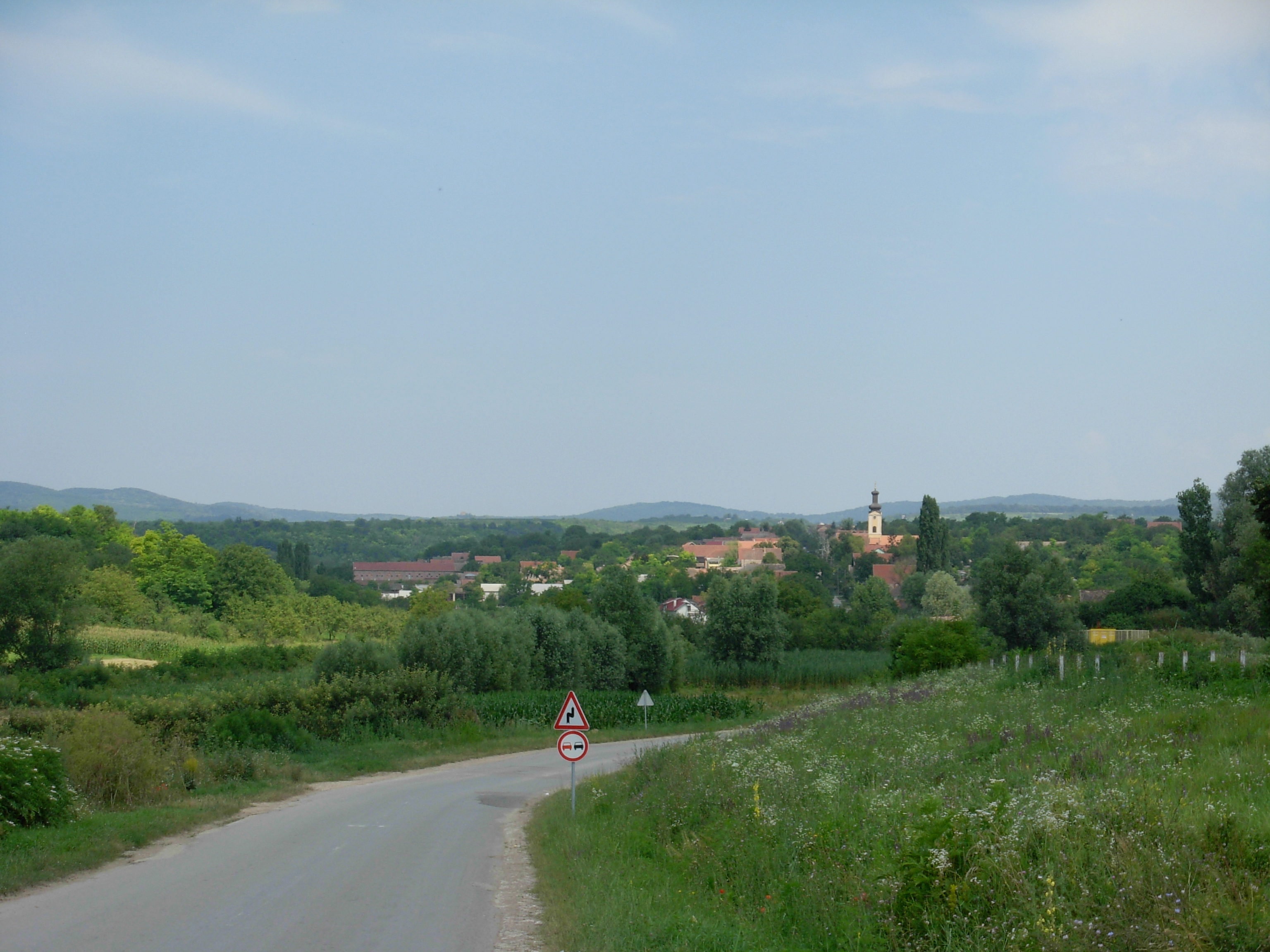
- Rivica

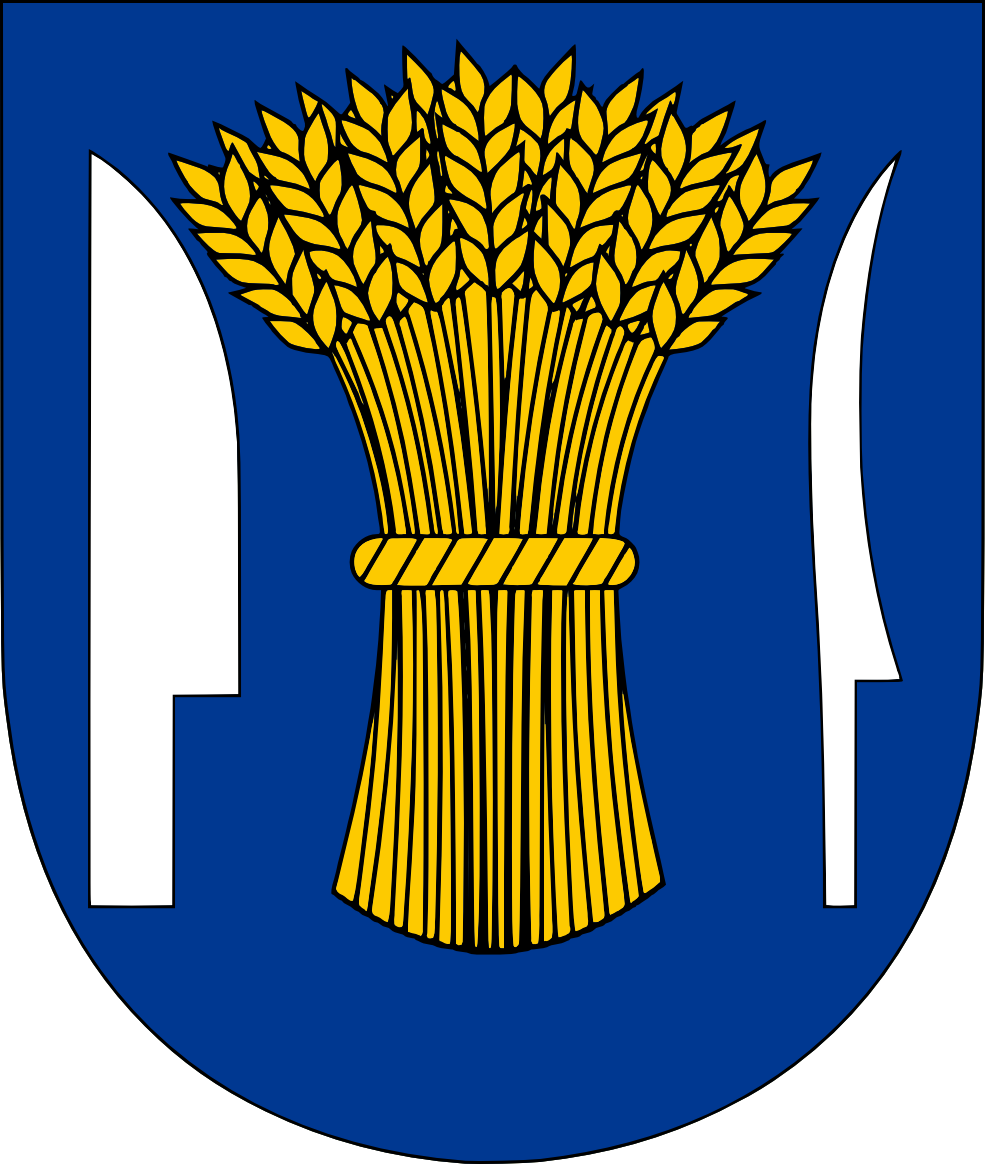
- Seal
- Interactive map of Rivica
- Location within Vojvodina Location within Serbia Location within Europe
- Coordinates: 45°05′N 19°50′E
- Country: Serbia
- Province: Vojvodina
- District: Srem
- Municipality: Irig

Population (2002)
  - Total: 657
- Time zone: UTC+1 (CET)
  - Summer (DST): UTC+2 (CEST)

Rivica (Serbian Cyrillic: Ривица) is a village in Serbia. It is situated in the Irig municipality, in the Srem District, Vojvodina province. The village has a Serb ethnic majority and its population numbering 657 people (2002 census).

== Demographics ==
According to the 2002 census, Rivica has a population of 657, 535 of whom are adults. The average age of the population is 43.2 years (40.9 for men and 45.5 for women). There are 224 households in the village.

== See also ==
- List of places in Serbia
- List of cities, towns and villages in Vojvodina
