= Grgeteg =

Grgeteg Гргетег (Serbian)
- Village (Selo)
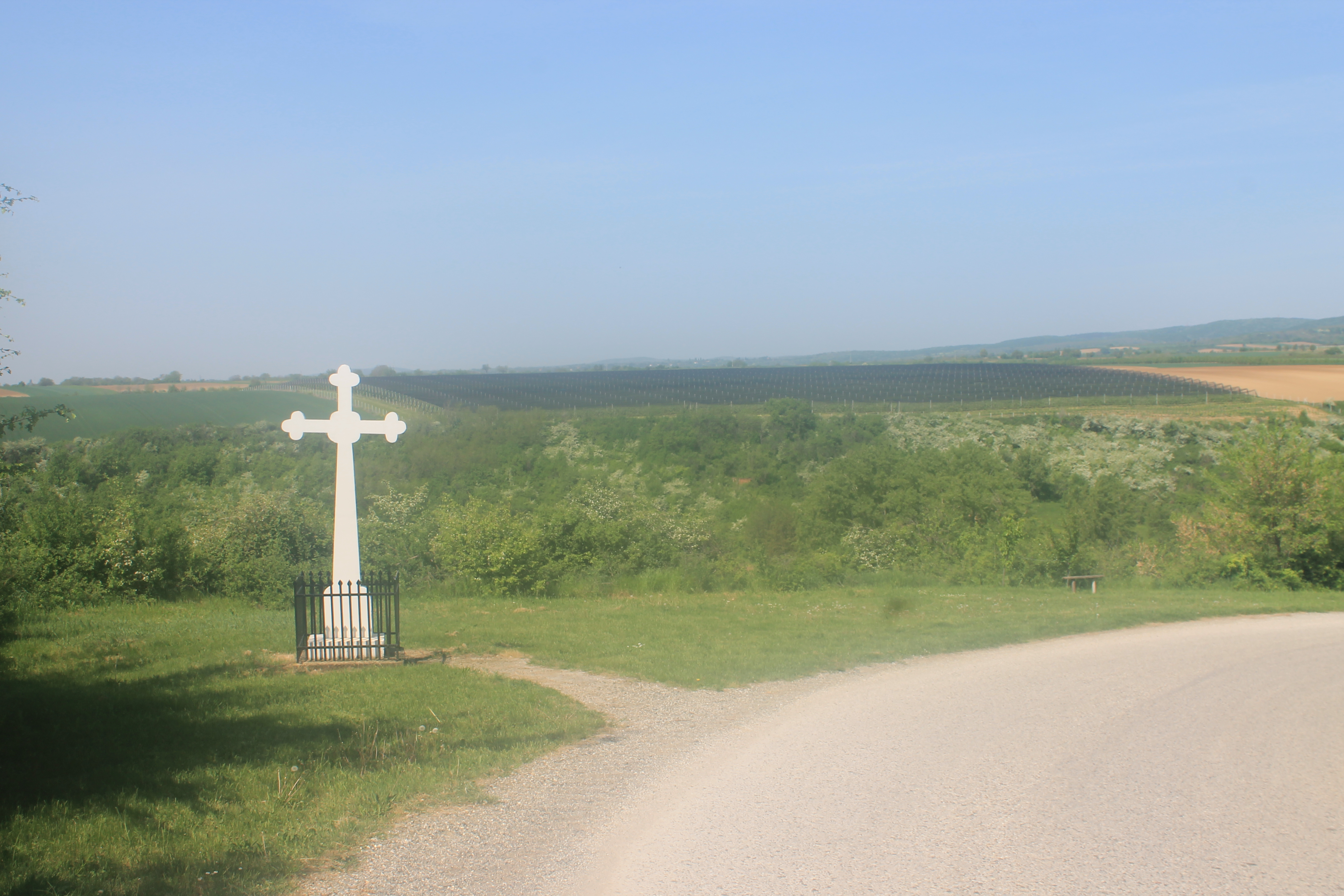

- Location within Vojvodina Location within Serbia Location within Europe
- Coordinates: 45°08′N 19°54′E
- Country: Serbia
- Province: Vojvodina
- District: Srem
- Municipality: Irig
- Time zone: UTC+1 (CET)
  - Summer (DST): UTC+2 (CEST)

Grgeteg (Serbian Cyrillic: Гргетег) is a village in Serbia. It is situated in the Irig municipality, in the Srem District, Vojvodina province. The village has a Serb ethnic majority among its population of 76, according to the 2011 census.

Grgeteg is home to the Grgeteg Monastery, one of the sixteen monasteries on the Fruška Gora mountain.

== Geography ==
Grgeteg is located in the region of Syrmia, on the southern slopes of Fruška Gora. The village is situated in the northeast of the municipality of Irig, on the Kalin creek. Its territory extends for 632 hectares (1,560 acres), with a median altitude of 260 metres (850 ft) above sea level. It is the least densely populated place in Vojvodina.

Grgeteg is located 25 kilometres (16 mi) from Novi Sad, 12 kilometres (7.5 mi) from Irig, and 24 kilometres (15 mi) from Ruma.

== History ==
The history of the village is closely tied to the Grgeteg Monastery, which was founded in the 15th century. The village itself was developed in the 18th century as a prnjavor, (Note: A prnjavor is a type of rural settlement, in the immediate vicinity of a monastery, whose inhabitants cultivated once-large monastery estates and were dependent on the monastery for a livelihood. See Serbian Wikipedia article: Прњавор (тип насеља) – ['Prnjavor (type of settlement)'] (in Serbian)) a rural village inhabited by serfs who were dependent on the religious institution.

According to tradition, the monastery was founded by the Serbian Despot, Vuk Grgurević in 1471; its existence is attested for the first time in 1545–1546. The konak of the monastery dates to the 18th century, and the church houses an iconostasis painted by Uroš Predić in 1902. The monastery is on the Serbian list of Immovable Cultural Heritage of Exceptional Importance.

== Demography ==
Population history
| Year | 1948 | 1953 | 1961 | 1971 | 1981 | 1991 | 2002 | 2011 |
| Pop. | 107 | 115 | 136 | 126 | 78 | 73 | 85 | 76 |
| ±% | — | +7.5% | +18.3% | −7.4% | −38.1% | −6.4% | +16.4% | −10.6% |

== Economy ==
The principal economic activity in Grgeteg is agriculture. Of the 632 hectares that make up the village, 307 of them (or 760 acres) are occupied by forest and 181 (450 acres) are cultivated. They mostly produce sweetcorn, wheat, and alfalfa.

== See also ==
- List of places in Serbia
- List of cities, towns and villages in Vojvodina
