= Dobrodol (Irig) =

Dobrodol Добродол (Serbian) Dobradó (Hungarian)
- Village (Selo)
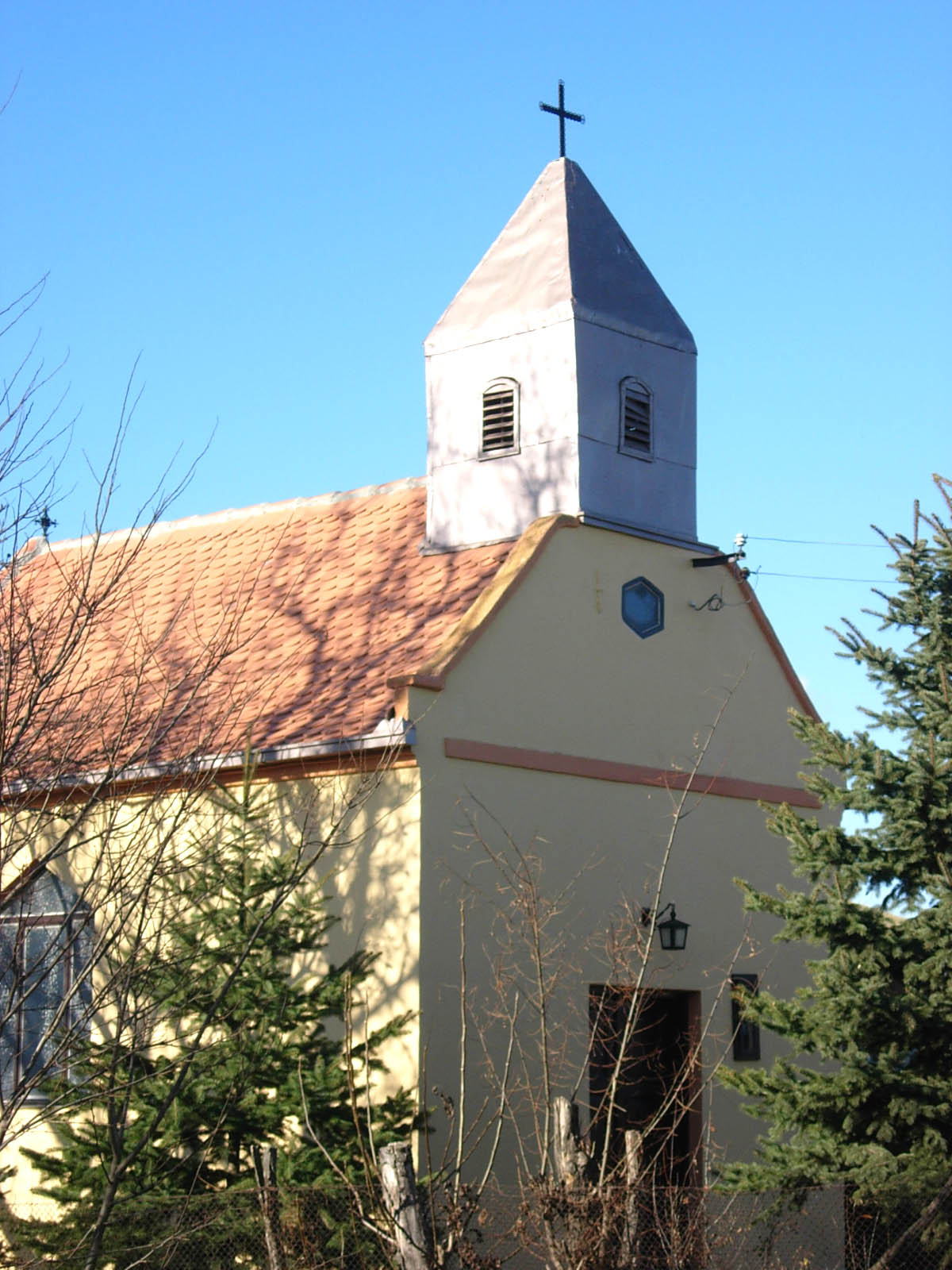
- The Catholic church.

- Location within Vojvodina Location within Serbia Location within Europe
- Coordinates: 45°02′N 19°56′E
- Country: Serbia
- Province: Vojvodina
- District: Srem
- Municipality: Irig

Population (2002)
  - Total: 127
- Time zone: UTC+1 (CET)
  - Summer (DST): UTC+2 (CEST)

Dobrodol (Serbian: Добродол, Hungarian: Dobradó or Dobradópuszta) is a village in Serbia. It is located in the Irig municipality, in the Srem District, Vojvodina province. The village has a Hungarian ethnic majority and its population numbering 127 people (2002 census).

== Historical population ==
- 1981: 129
- 1991: 126

== See also ==
- List of places in Serbia
- List of cities, towns and villages in Vojvodina
