= Šatrinci =

Šatrinci Шатринци (Serbian) Satrinca (Hungarian)
- Village (Selo)
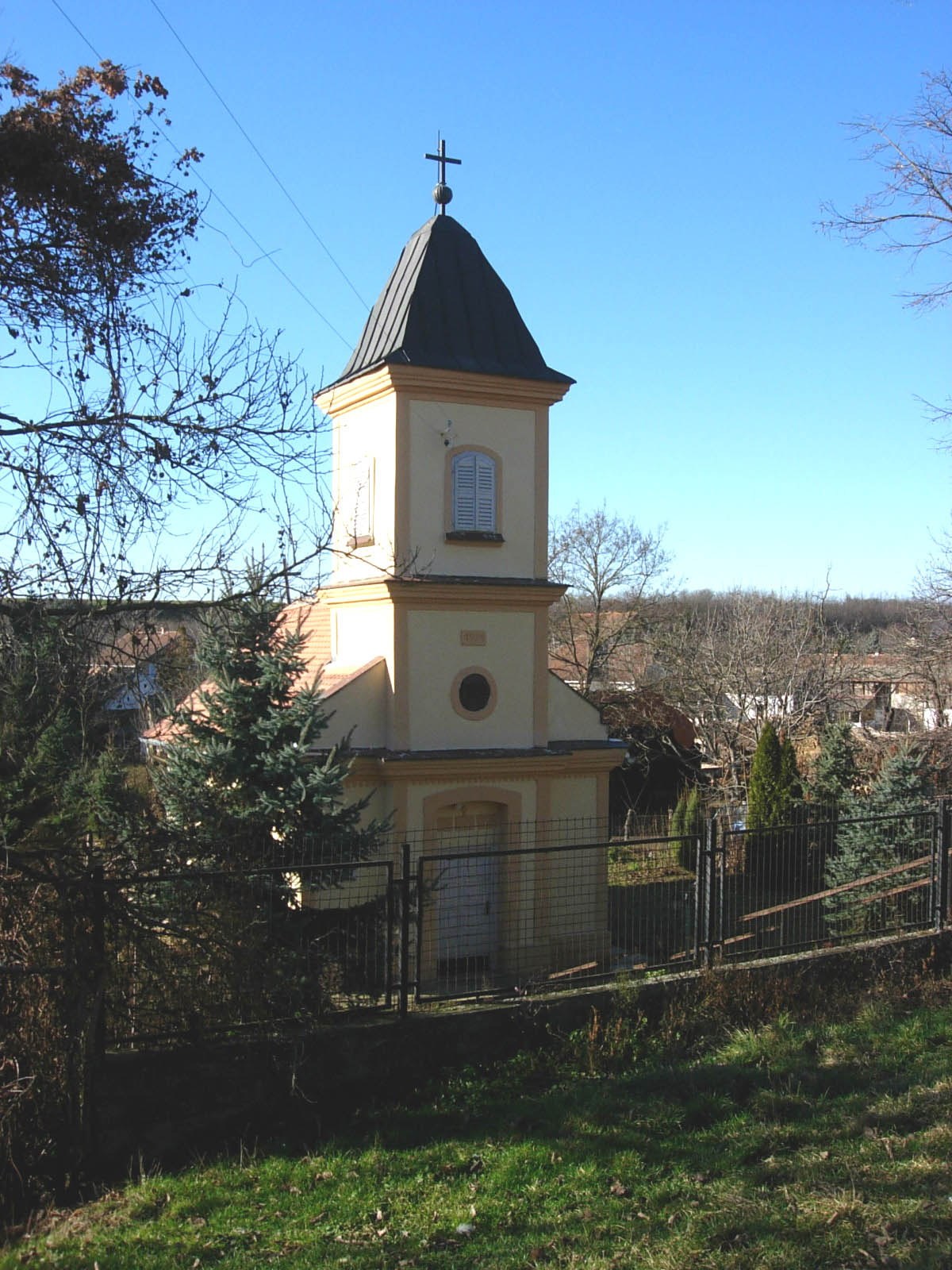
- The Catholic church.

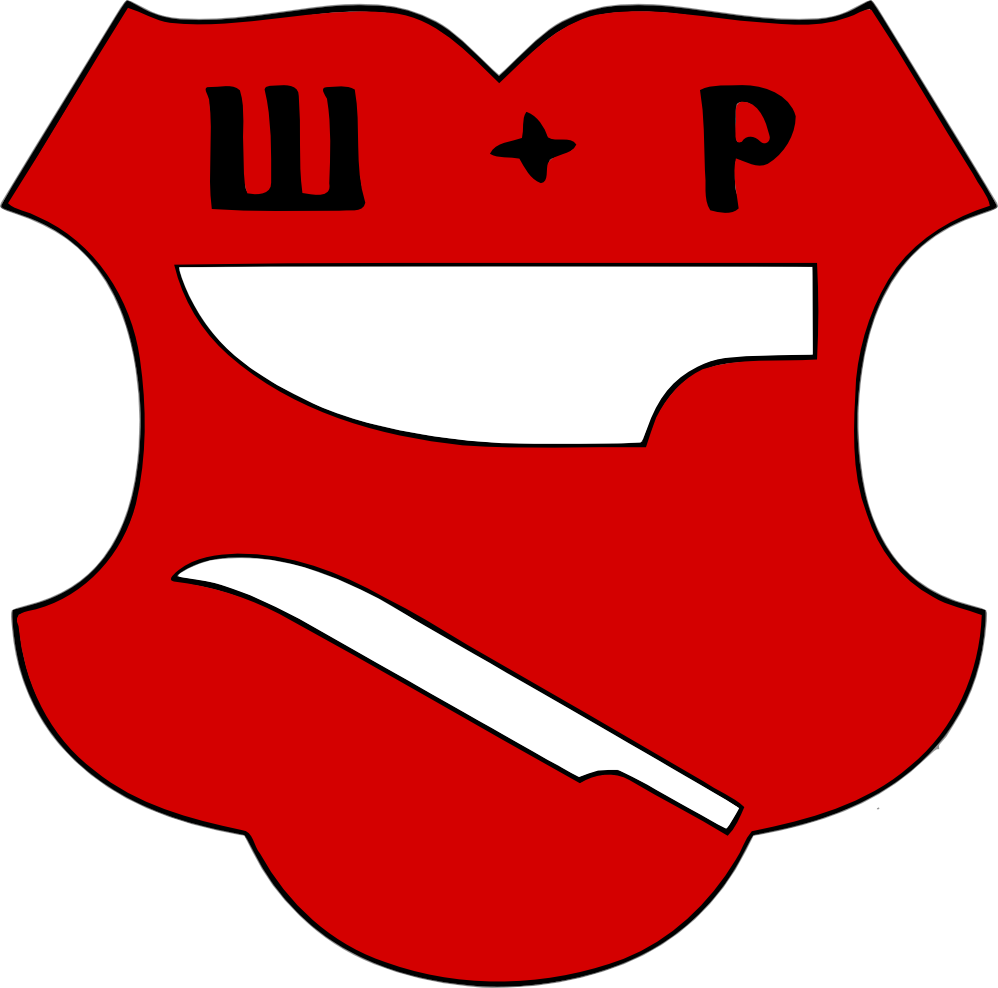
- Coat of arms

- Location within Vojvodina Location within Serbia Location within Europe
- Coordinates: 45°04′N 19°55′E
- Country: Serbia
- Province: Vojvodina
- District: Srem
- Municipality: Irig

Population (2002)
  - Total: 399
- Time zone: UTC+1 (CET)
  - Summer (DST): UTC+2 (CEST)

Šatrinci (Serbian Cyrillic: Шатринци, Hungarian: Satrinca) is a village in Serbia. It is located in the Irig municipality, in the Srem District, Vojvodina province. The village has a Hungarian ethnic majority and its population numbering 399 people (2002 census).

== Name ==
The name of the village in Serbian is plural.

== Historical population ==
- 1961: 810
- 1971: 593
- 1981: 395
- 1991: 400

== See also ==
- List of places in Serbia
- List of cities, towns and villages in Vojvodina
