= Velika Remeta =

Velika Remeta Велика Ремета (Serbian)
- Village (Selo)
- Location within Vojvodina Location within Serbia Location within Europe
- Coordinates: 45°09′N 19°55′E
- Country: Serbia
- Province: Vojvodina
- District: Srem
- Municipality: Irig
- Time zone: UTC+1 (CET)
  - Summer (DST): UTC+2 (CEST)

Velika Remeta (Serbian Cyrillic: Велика Ремета) is a village in Serbia. It is situated in the Irig municipality, in the Srem District, Vojvodina province. The village has a Serb ethnic majority and its population numbering 42 people (2002 census). The Velika Remeta Monastery is located near the village.

== Nature ==
Lepidoptera of Remeta include Zygaena filipendulae.

== See also ==
- List of places in Serbia
- List of cities, towns and villages in Vojvodina
- Velika Remeta Monastery
