= Tihomir Stojaković =

Serbian politician

Tihomir Stojaković (Serbian Cyrillic: Тихомир Стојаковић; born 25 July 1985) is a Serbian politician. He served in the Assembly of Vojvodina from 2016 to 2020 and has been the mayor of Irig since August 2020. Stojaković is a member of the Serbian Progressive Party (SNS).

== Early life and career ==
Stojaković was born in Novi Grad, in what was then the Socialist Federal Republic of Yugoslavia. He attended primary and secondary school in Irig and graduated from the University of Novi Sad's Faculty of Sport and Physical Education. He taught at the secondary school Borislav Mihajlović Mihiz from 2009 to 2013 and was director of the same institution from 2013 to 2016.

== Politician ==
Stojaković served on Irig's municipal council (i.e., the executive branch of the municipal government) from 2012 to 2015 with responsibility for sports and youth. He joined the Serbian Progressive Party in 2014.

He appeared in the sixty-sixth position on the SNS's electoral list in the 2016 Vojvodina provincial election and narrowly missed direct election when the list won a majority victory with sixty-three out of 120 seats. He received a mandate on 18 July 2016 as the replacement for another party delegate and served for the next four years as a government supporter. In the assembly, he was a member of the committee on education and science and the committee on youth and sports. He did not seek re-election in 2020.

Stojaković led the SNS list for Irig in the 2020 Serbian local elections and was elected when the list won a majority victory with fifteen out of nineteen seats. He was chosen as mayor of the municipality on 24 August 2020.
