= Velika Remeta Monastery =

Monastery in Serbia

Coordinates: 45°08′32″N 19°55′03″E

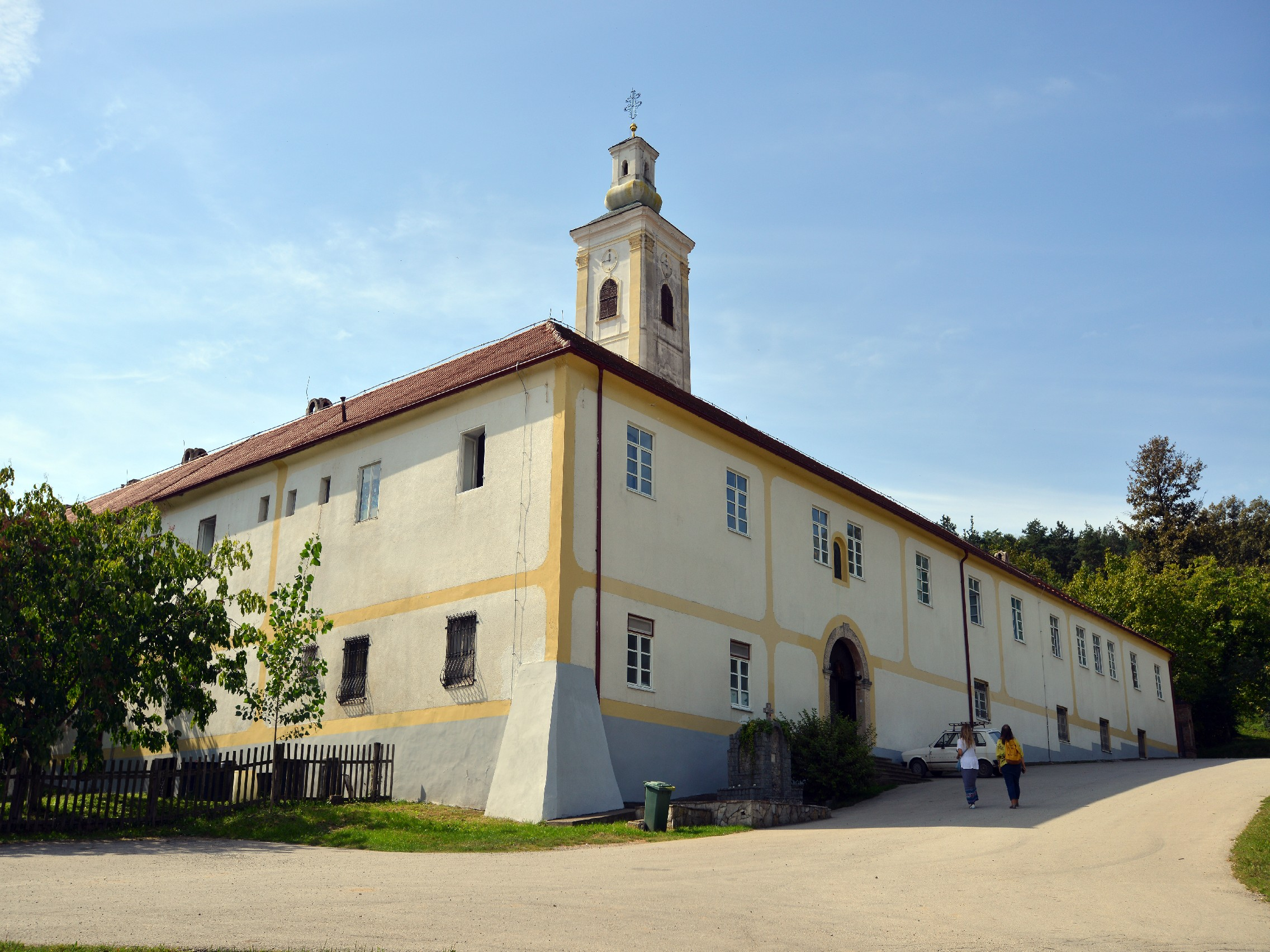
- Monastery in 2007

- Location within Serbia

Religion
- Affiliation: Serbian Orthodox Church
- Region: Srem
- Patron: King Stefan Dragutin
- Status: Active

Location
- Location: Velika Remeta, Serbia
- Interactive map of Velika Remeta Monastery

The Velika Remeta Monastery (Serbian: Манастир Велика Ремета, romanized: Manastir Velika Remeta) is a Serbian Orthodox monastery located in the village of Velika Remeta on the mountain Fruška Gora in northern Serbia. It is one of several monasteries of Fruška Gora. Traditionally, its founding is linked to King Stefan Dragutin. The earliest historical records about the monastery date to 1562. It was declared Monument of Culture of Exceptional Importance in 1990, and it is protected by the state.

== Gallery ==
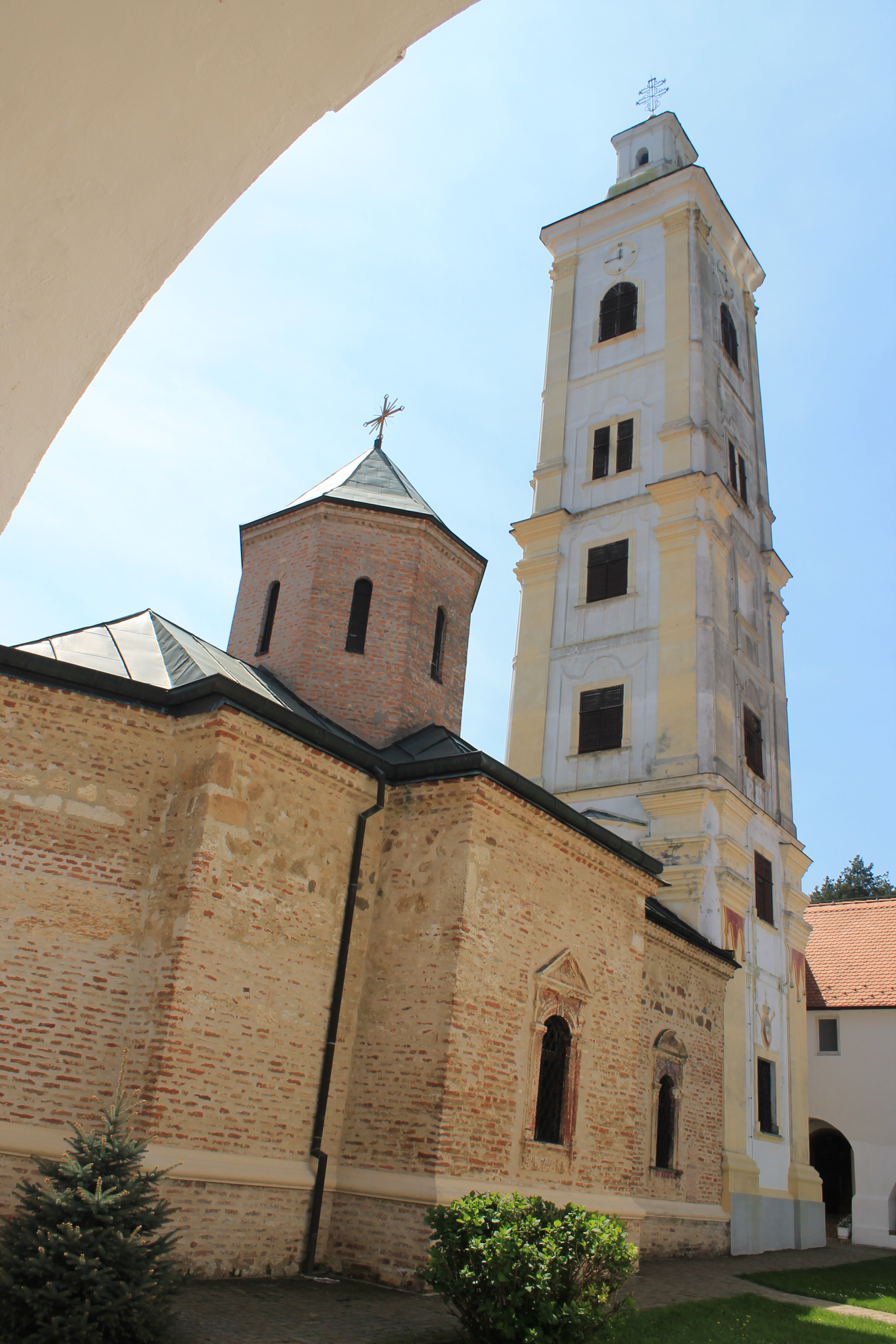

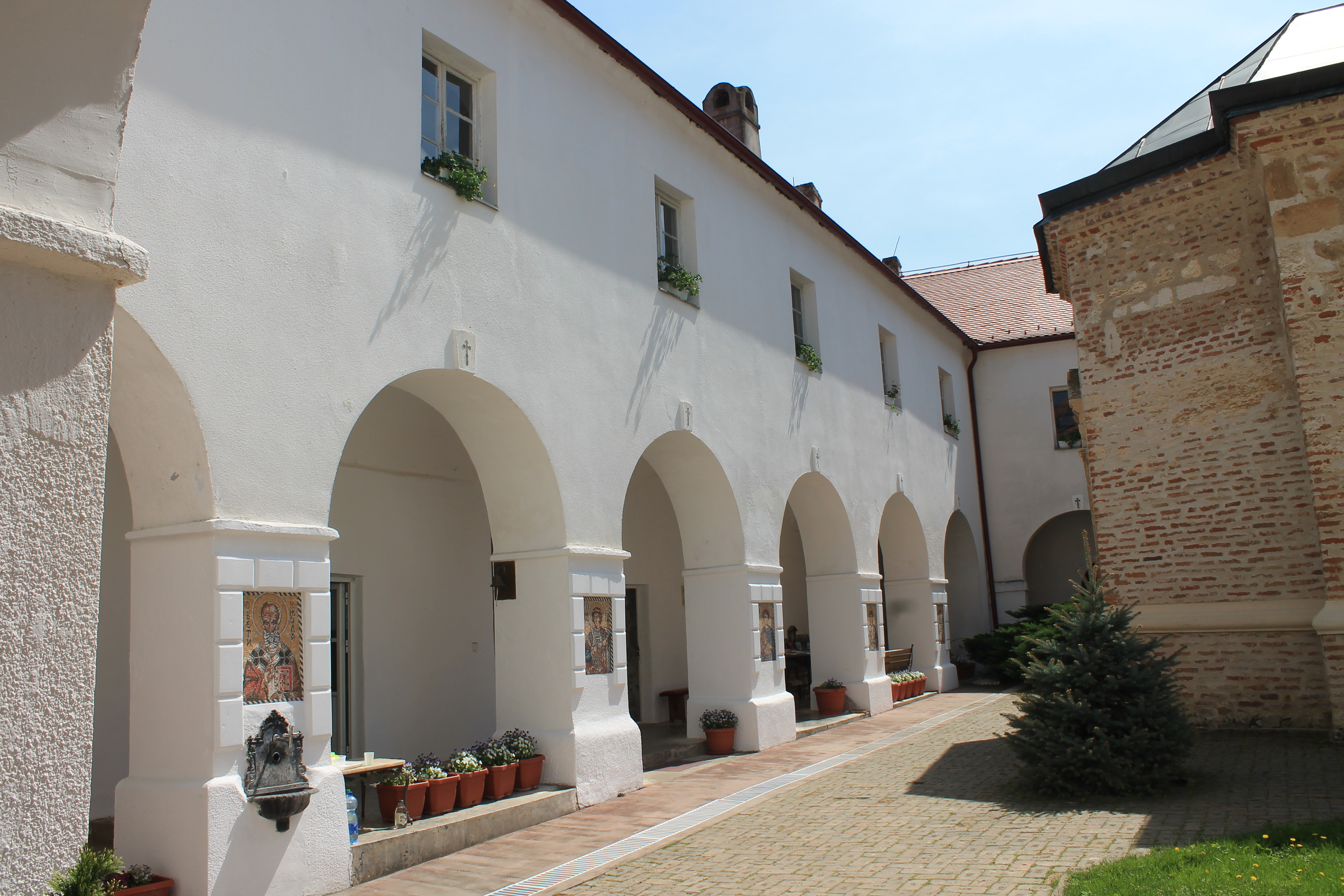

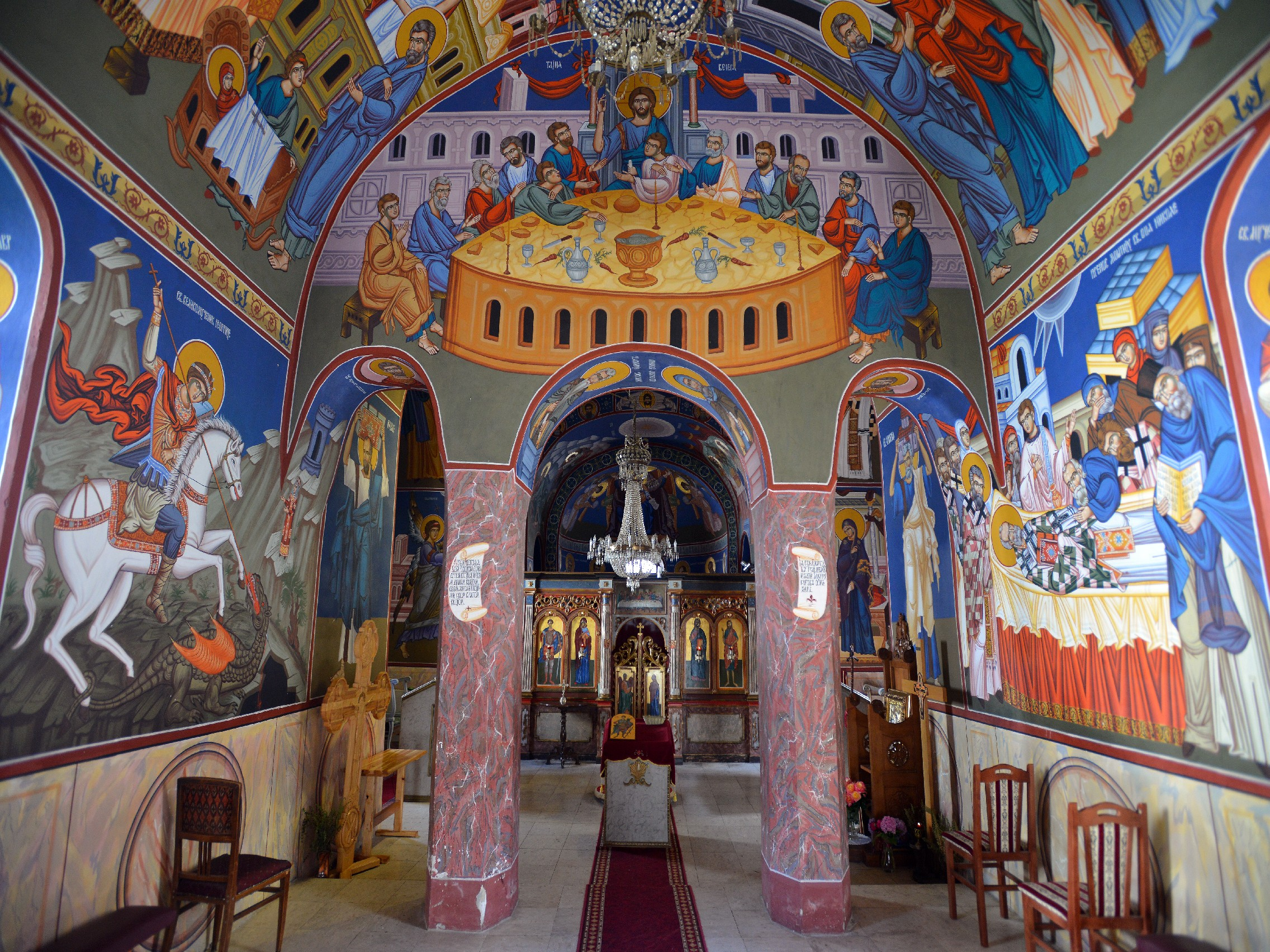

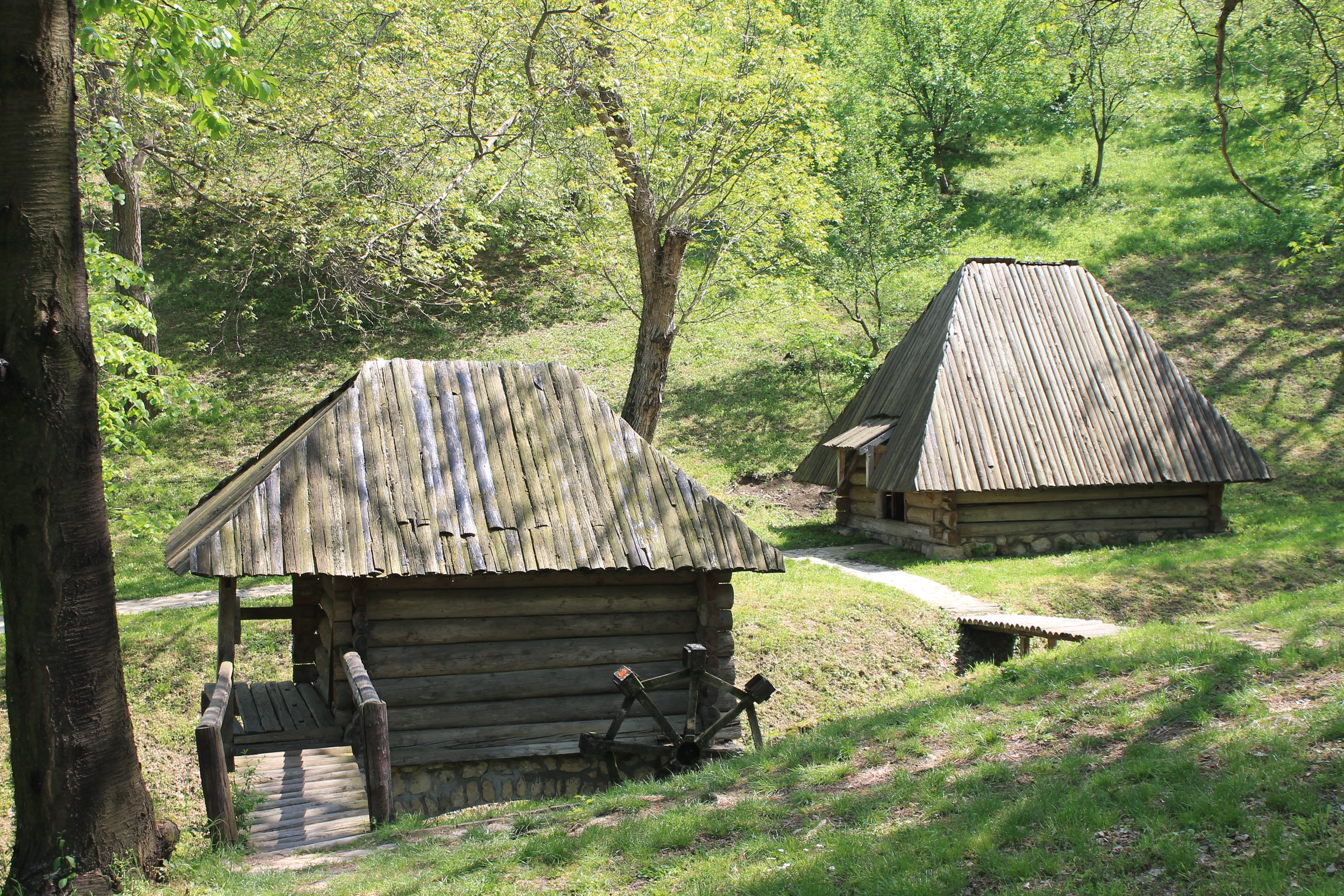

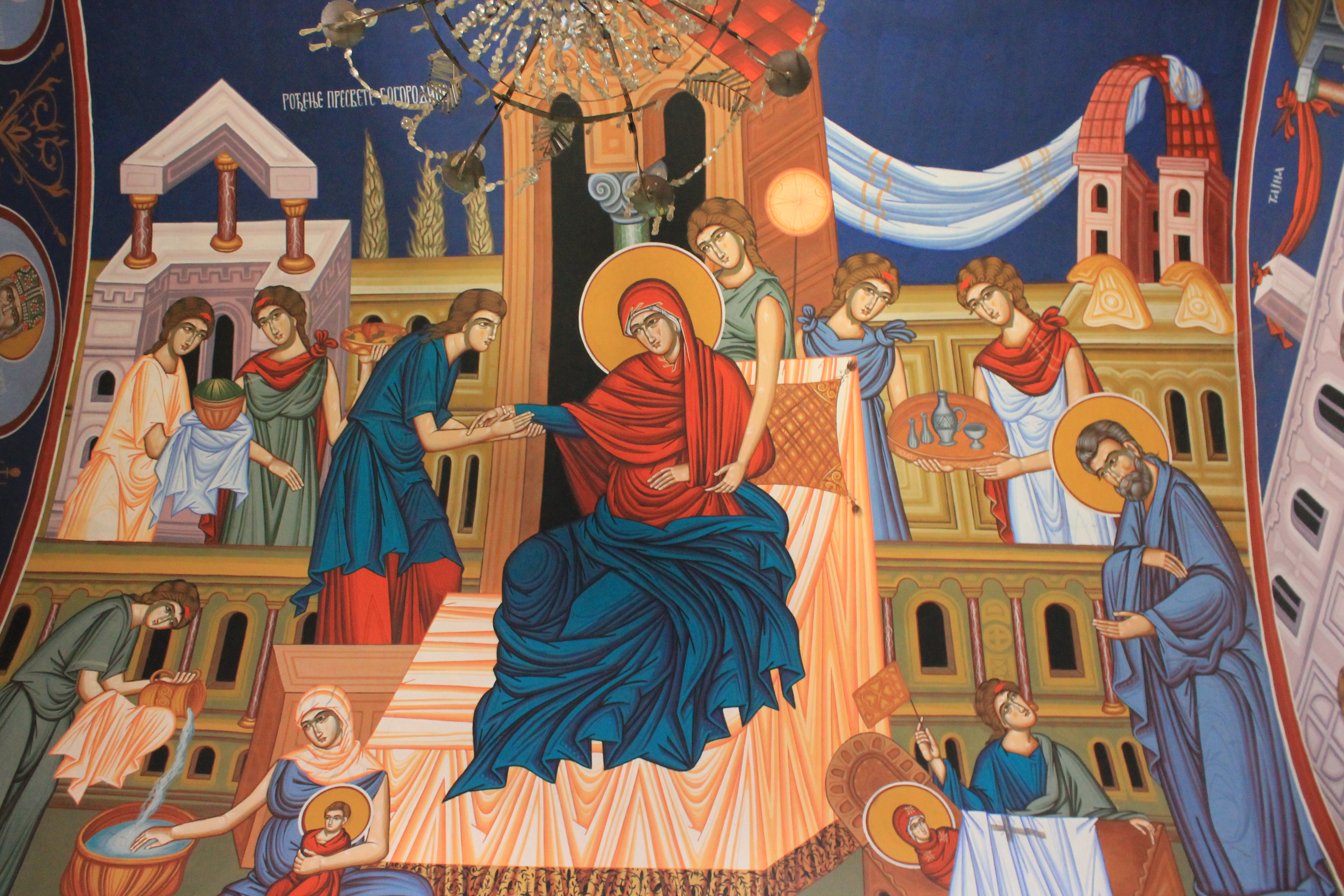

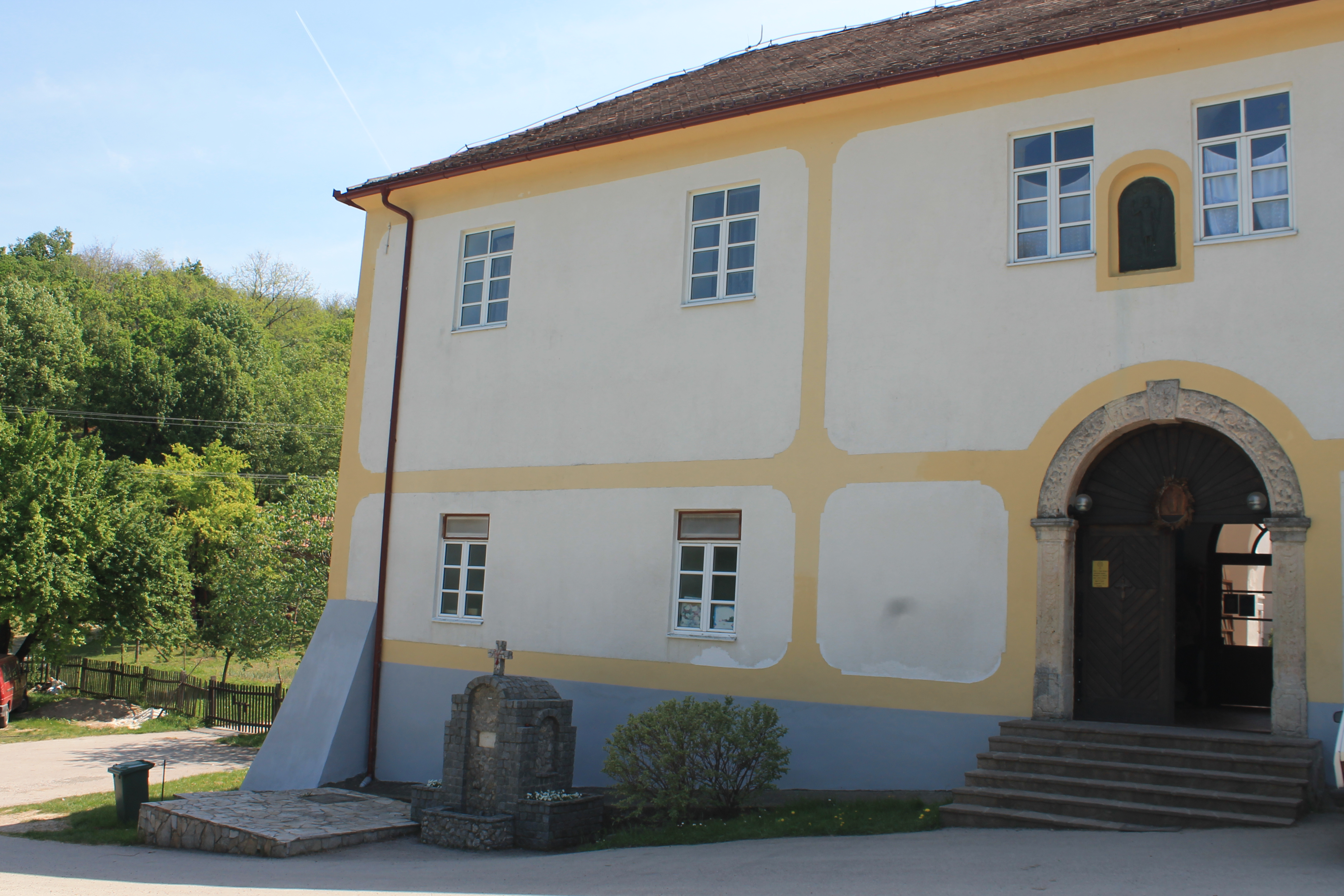

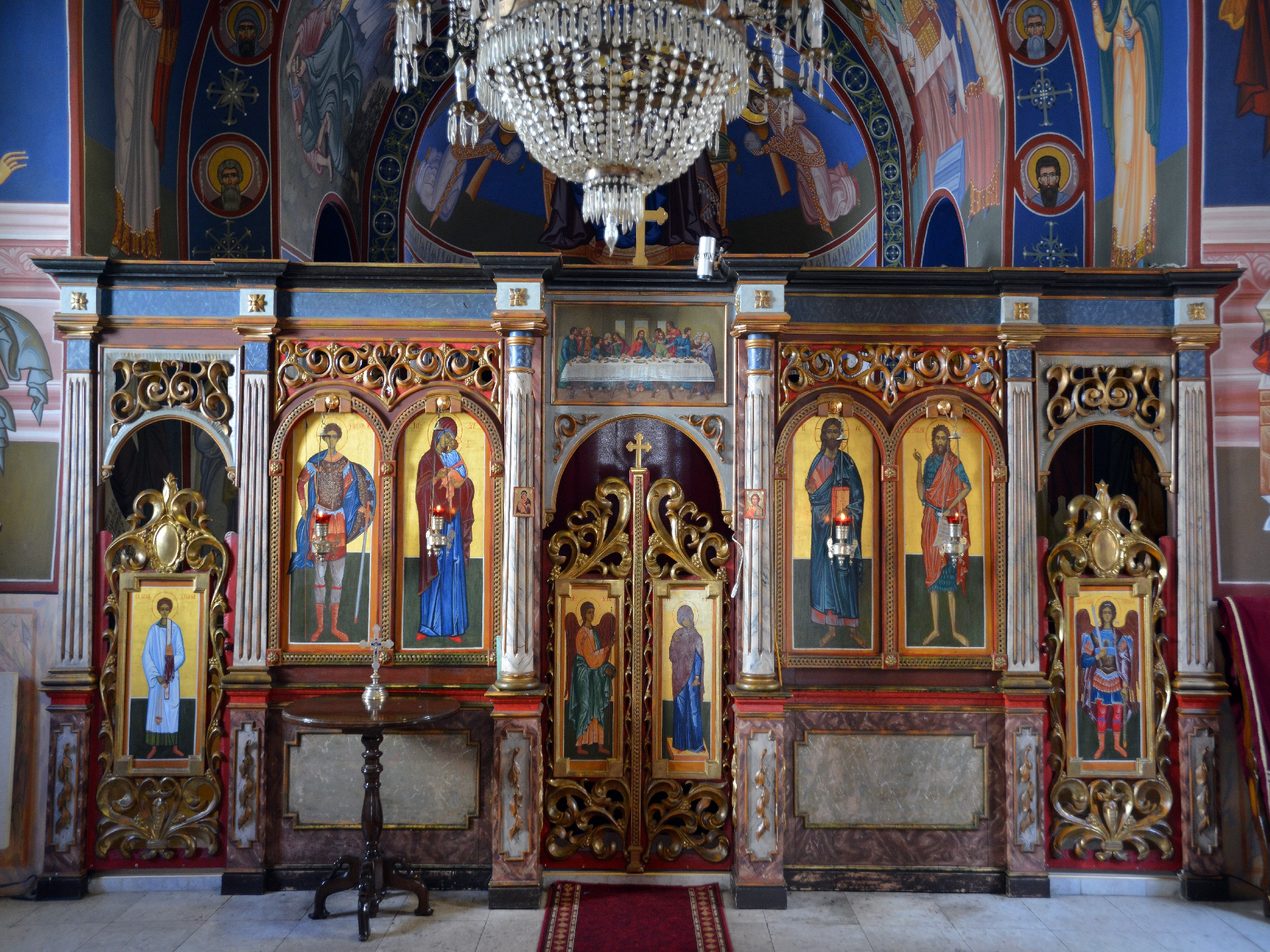

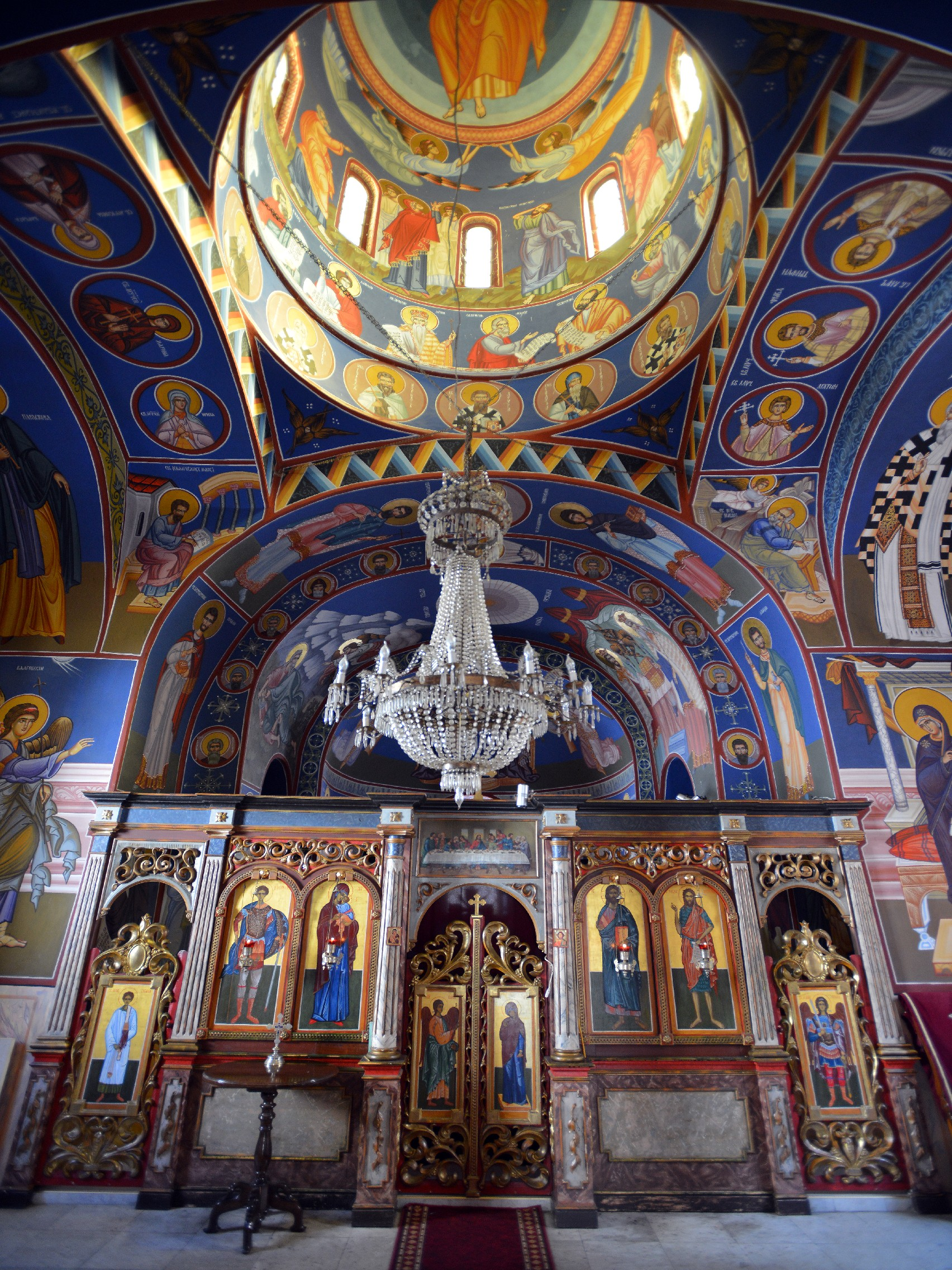

== See also ==
- List of Serbian Orthodox monasteries

== Sources ==
- Petrović, Dušan K. (1970). Istorija sremske eparhije. Eparhija sremska.
