= Krušedol Selo =

Krušedol Selo Крушедол Село (Serbian)
- Village (Selo)
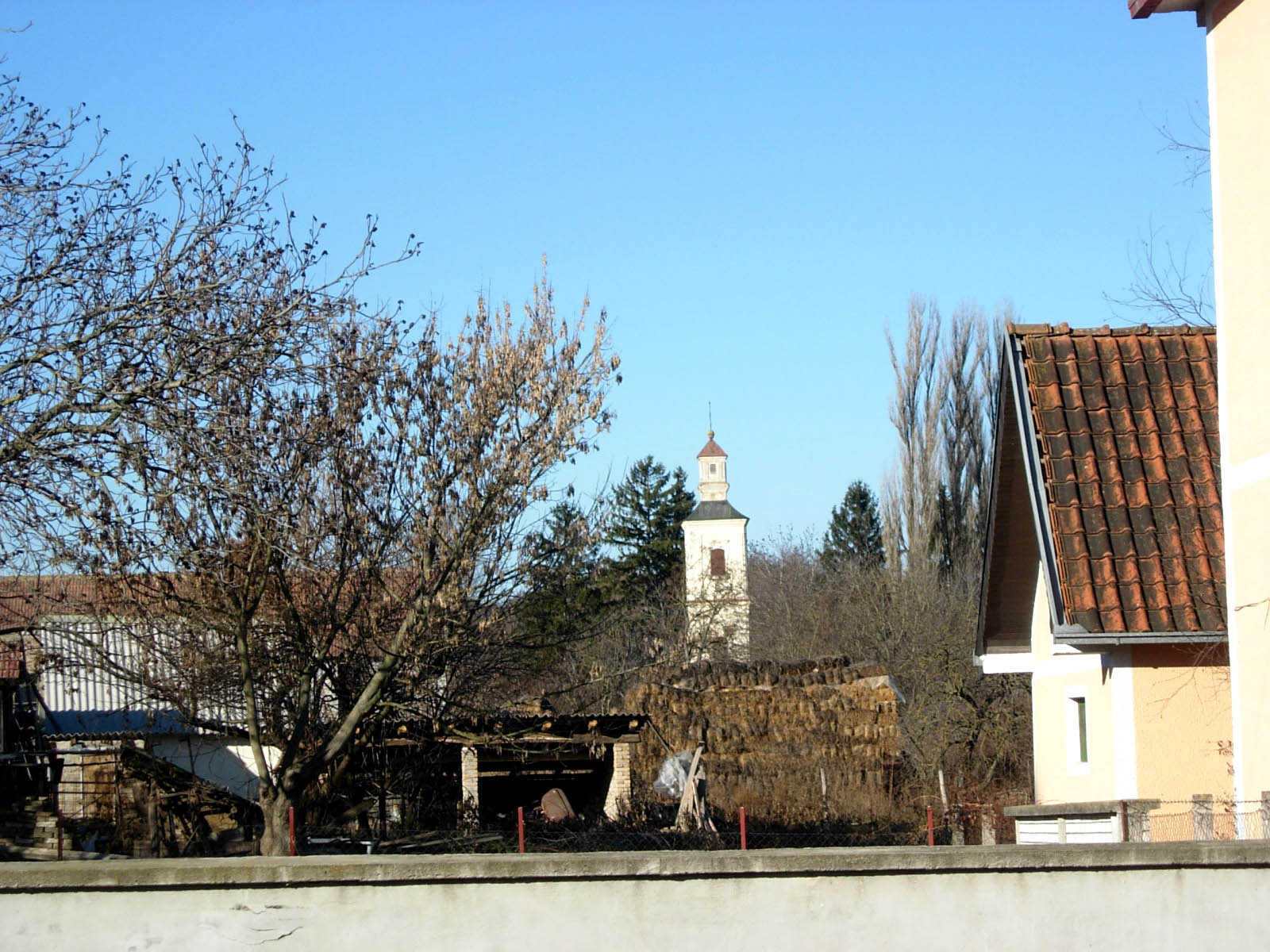
- The Orthodox church.

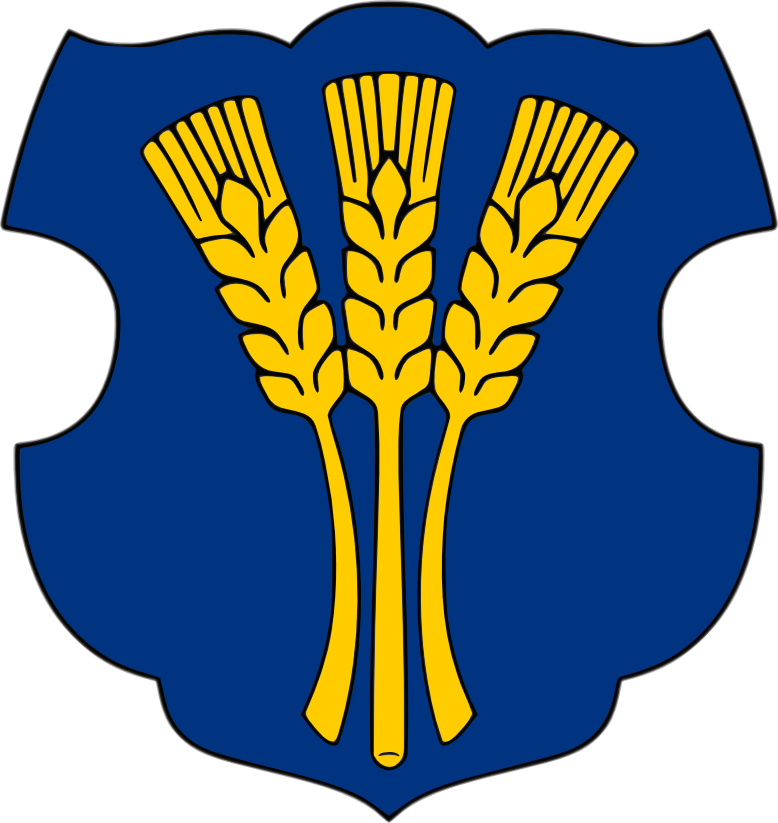
- Seal

- Location within Vojvodina Location within Serbia Location within Europe
- Coordinates: 45°07′N 19°57′E
- Country: Serbia
- Province: Vojvodina
- District: Srem
- Municipality: Irig

Population (2002)
  - Total: 388
- Time zone: UTC+1 (CET)
  - Summer (DST): UTC+2 (CEST)

Krušedol Selo (Serbian Cyrillic: Крушедол Село) is a village in Serbia. It is located in the Irig municipality, in the Srem District, Vojvodina province. The village has a Serb ethnic majority and its population numbering 388 people (2002 census). It lies on the southeast slopes of Fruška gora mountain. At the close vicinity, there is a village of Krušedol Prnjavor; together, they are often referred to as just "Krušedol".

== Historical population ==
- 1961: 606
- 1971: 542
- 1981: 424
- 1991: 372

== See also ==
- List of places in Serbia
- List of cities, towns and villages in Vojvodina
