= Krušedol Prnjavor =

Krušedol Prnjavor Крушедол Прњавор (Serbian)
- Village (Selo)
- Location within Vojvodina Location within Serbia Location within Europe
- Coordinates: 45°07′N 19°56′E
- Country: Serbia
- Province: Vojvodina
- District: Srem
- Municipality: Irig

Population (2002)
  - Total: 277
- Time zone: UTC+1 (CET)
  - Summer (DST): UTC+2 (CEST)

Krušedol Prnjavor (Serbian Cyrillic: Крушедол Прњавор) is a village in Serbia. It is situated in the Irig municipality, in the Srem District, Vojvodina province. The village has a Serb ethnic majority and its population numbering 277 people (2002 census). It lies on the southeast slopes of Fruška gora mountain. At the close vicinity, there is a village of Krušedol Selo; together, they are often referred to as just "Krušedol".

It is said that the village was established during the Great Migrations of the Serbs Great Migrations of the Serbs in the period between 1689 and 1739.

The term 'Prnjavor' indicates that the town is built on land belonging to the monastery, namely Krušedol Monastery. The land is said to have been given by the monastery to the Serbs who migrated North during The Great Migrations of the Serbs who sought asylum and safety from the brutality of the Ottoman Empire which had prevailed in the South. These people had to earn their land by serving in the monastery. The term 'Prnja' translates roughly to 'rags worn by peasants'. 'Prnjavor' therefore translates into place of peasants.

== See also ==
- List of places in Serbia
- List of cities, towns and villages in Vojvodina
