= Irig, Serbia =

Irig Ириг (Serbian)
- Town and municipality
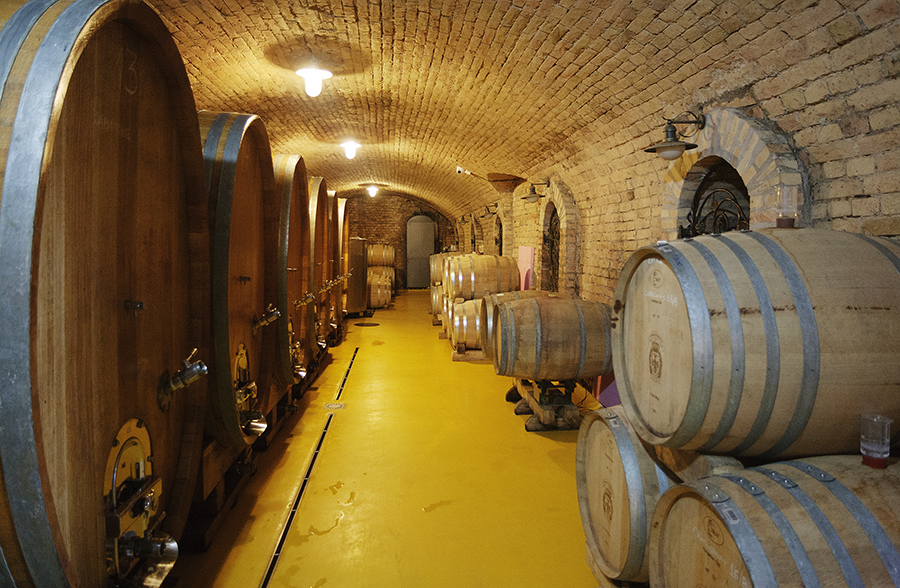
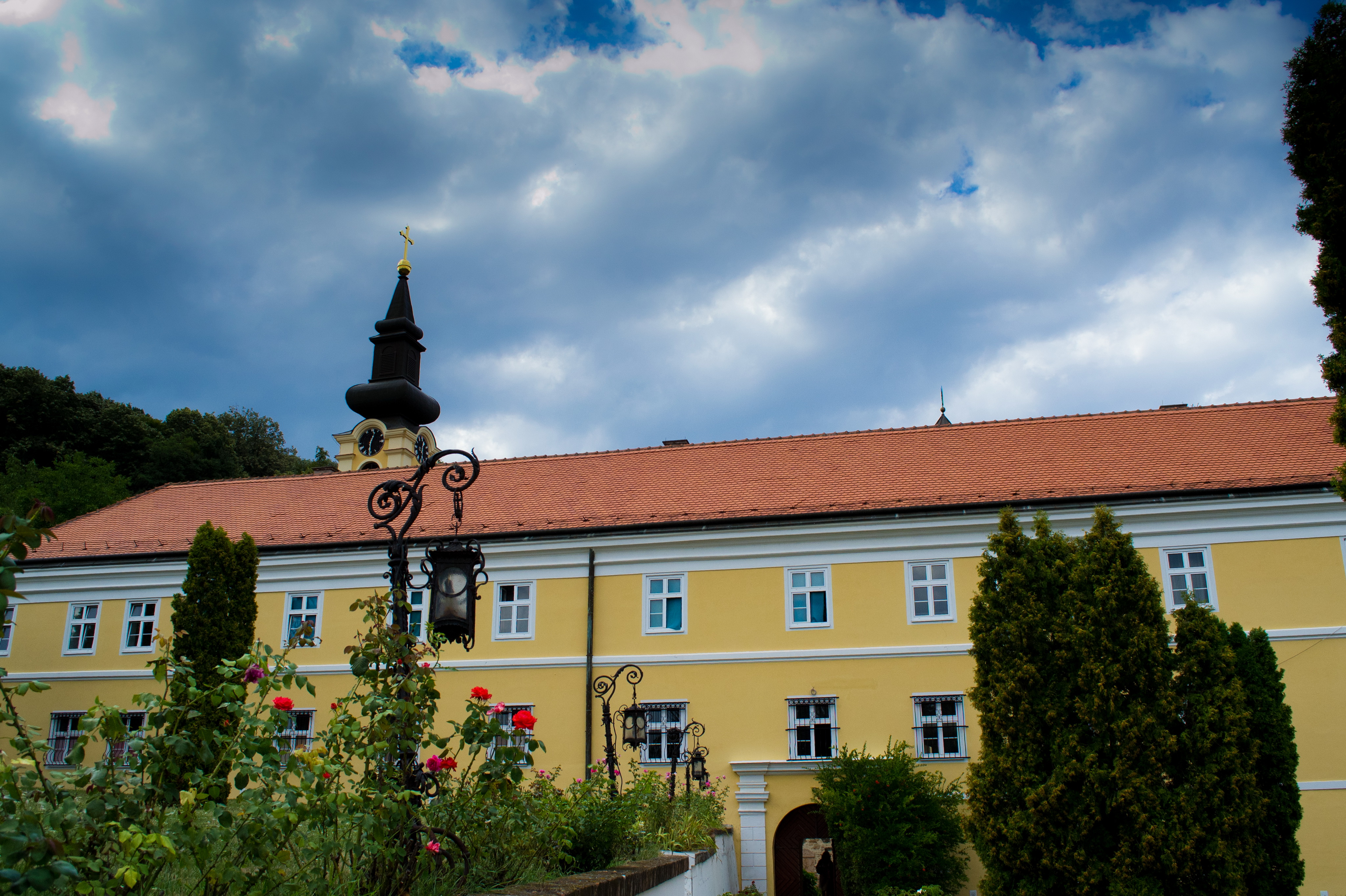
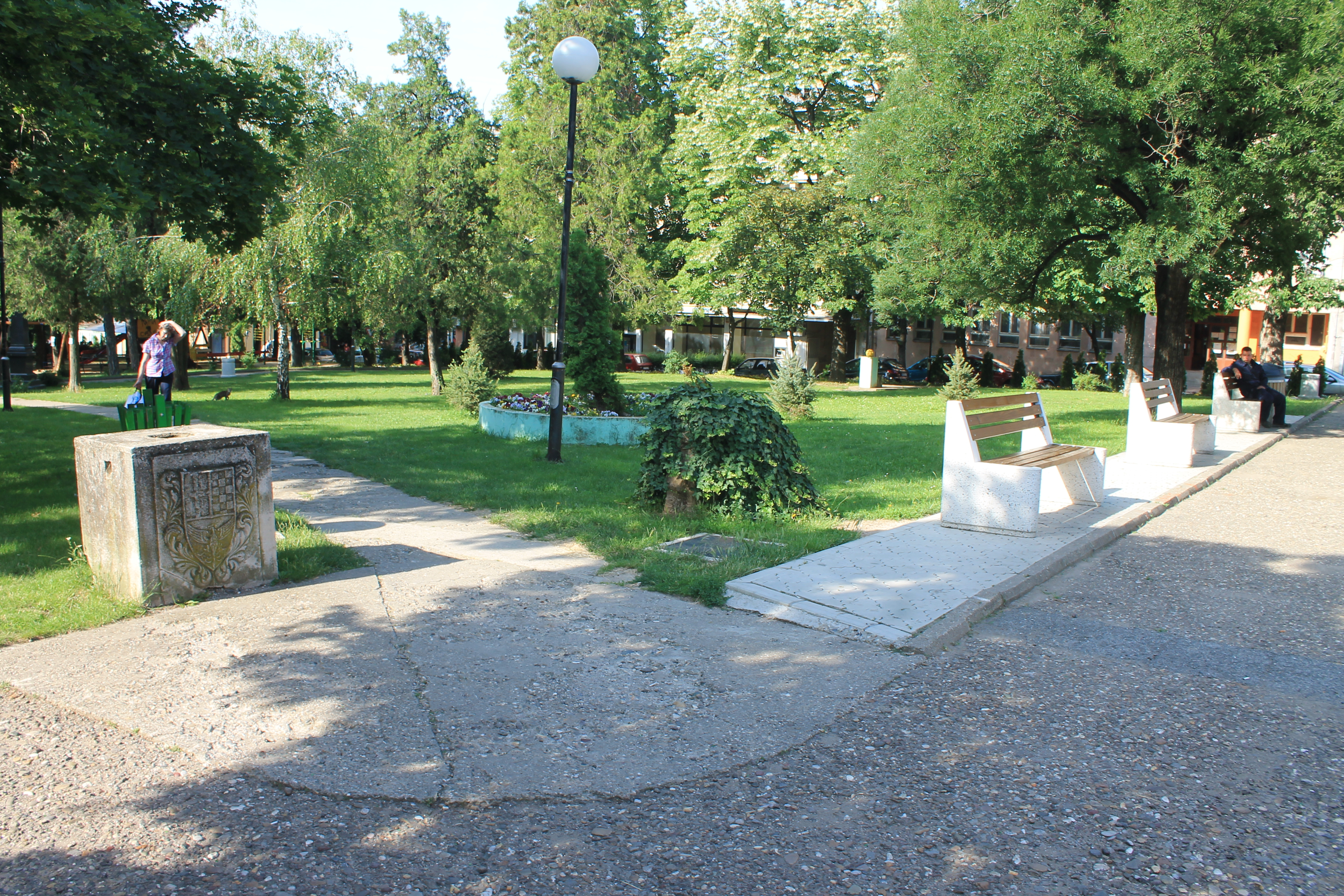
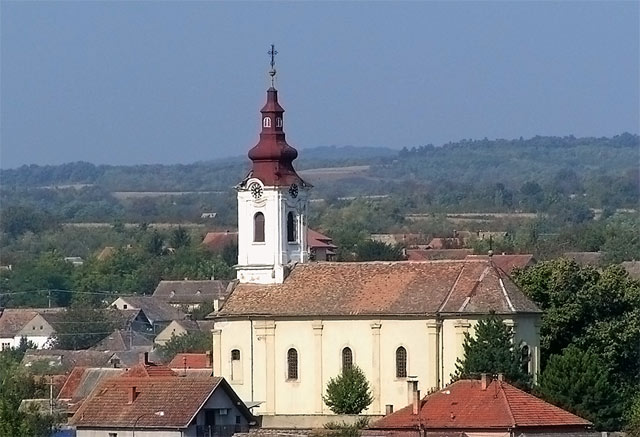
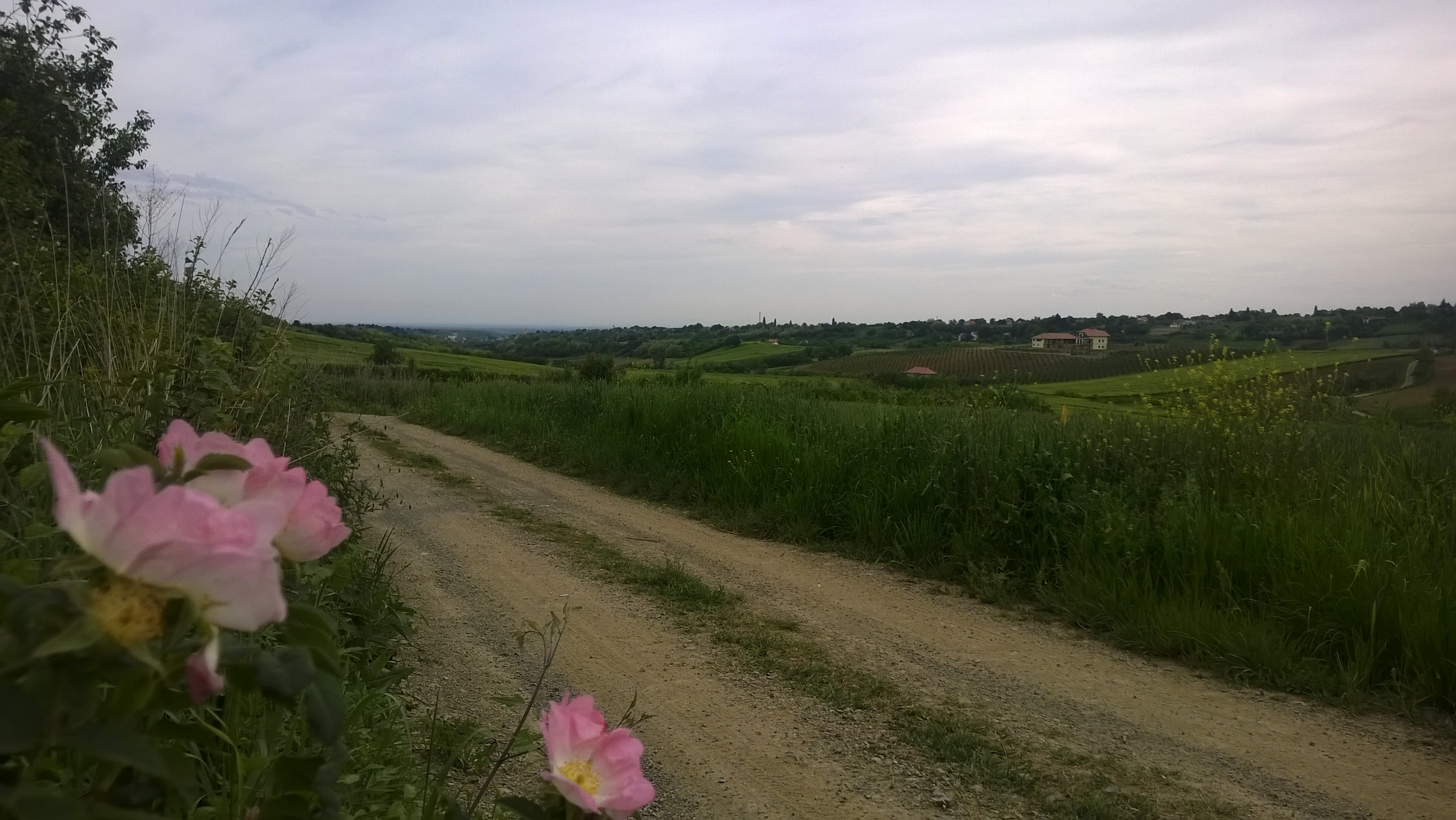
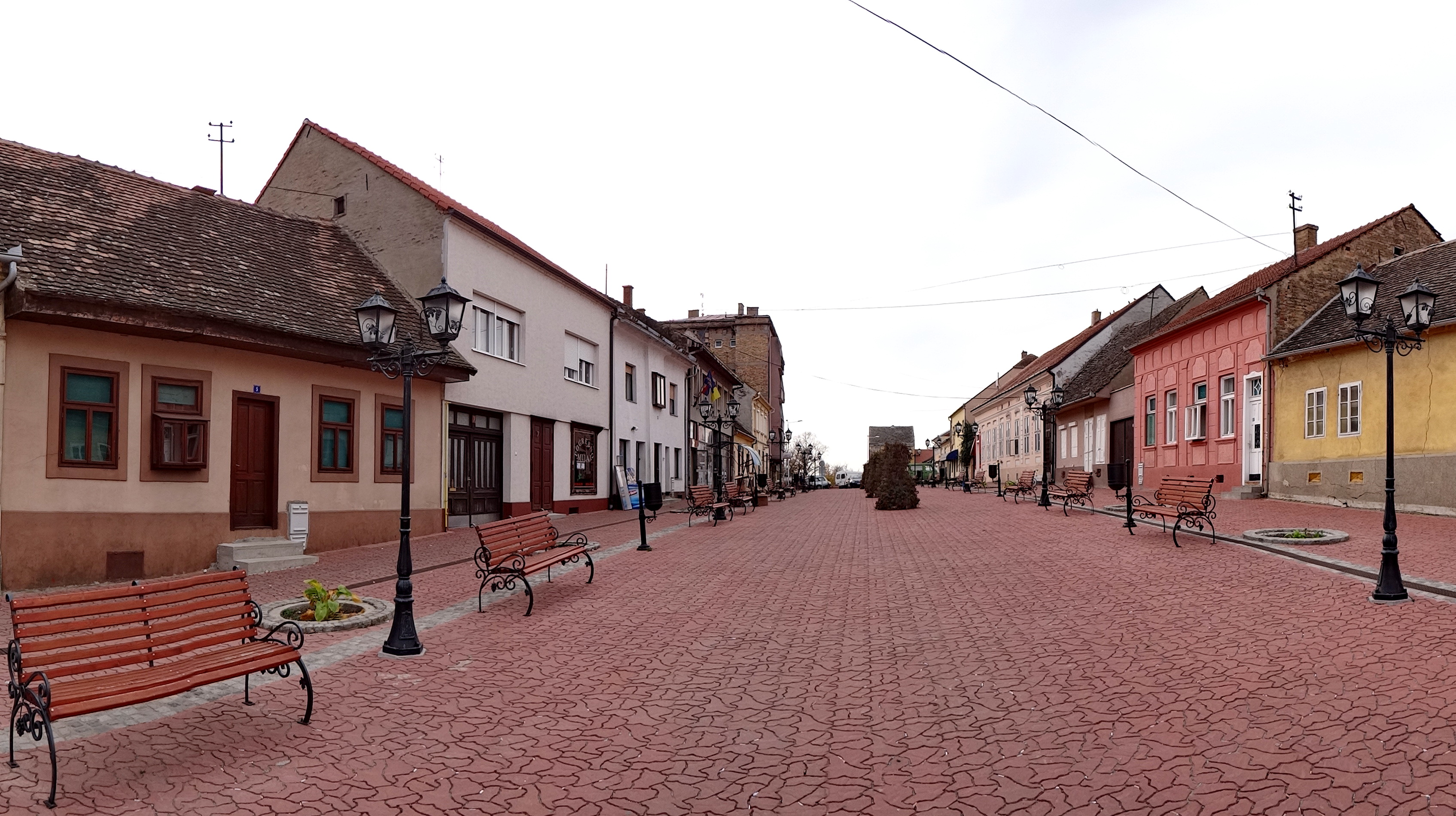
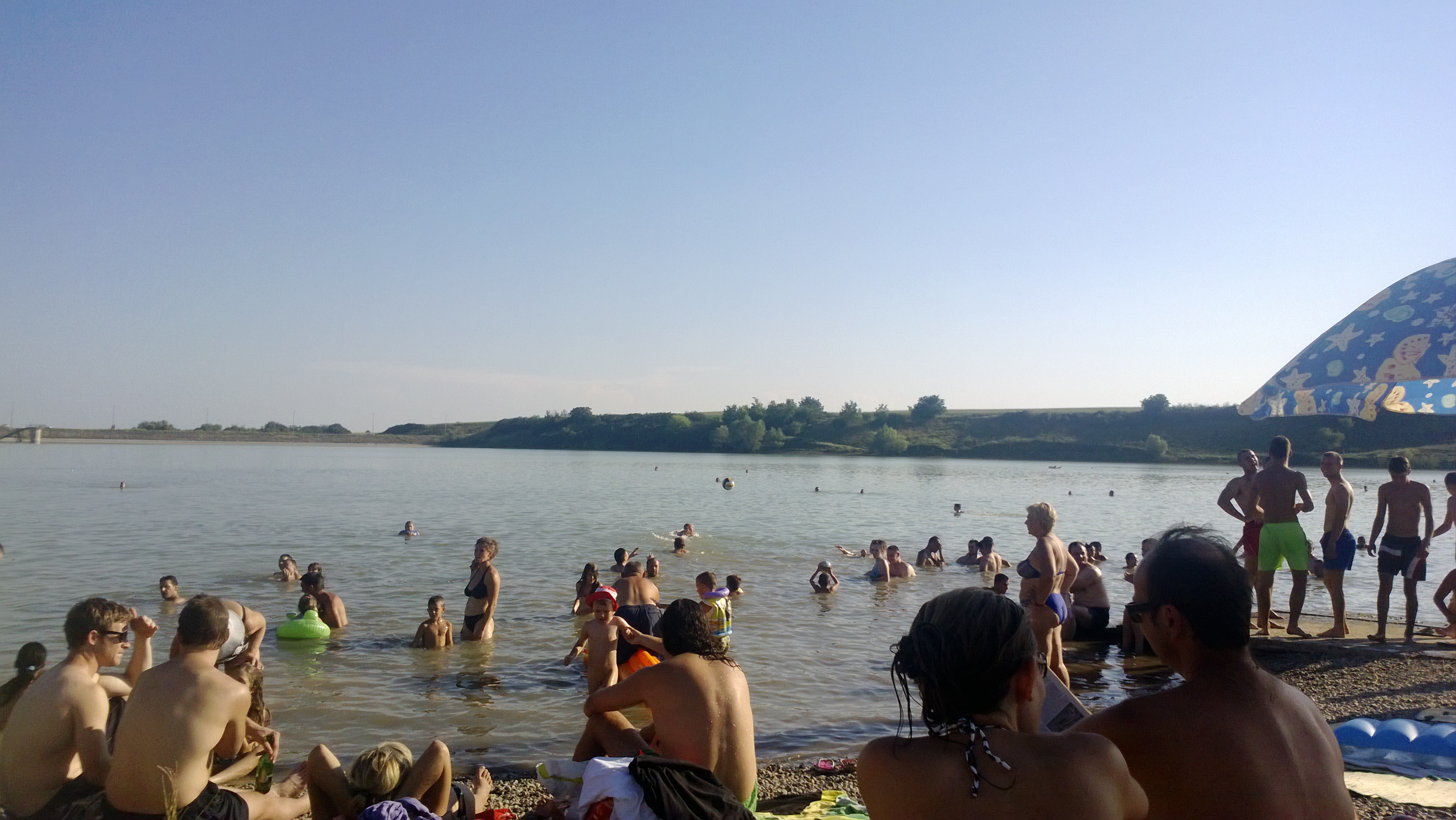
- Irig

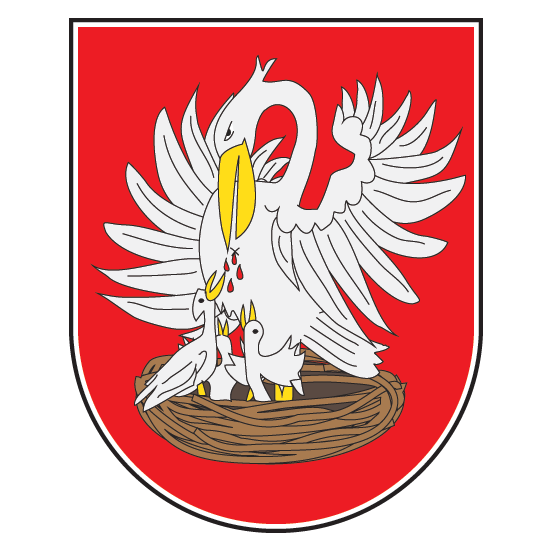
- Coat of arms

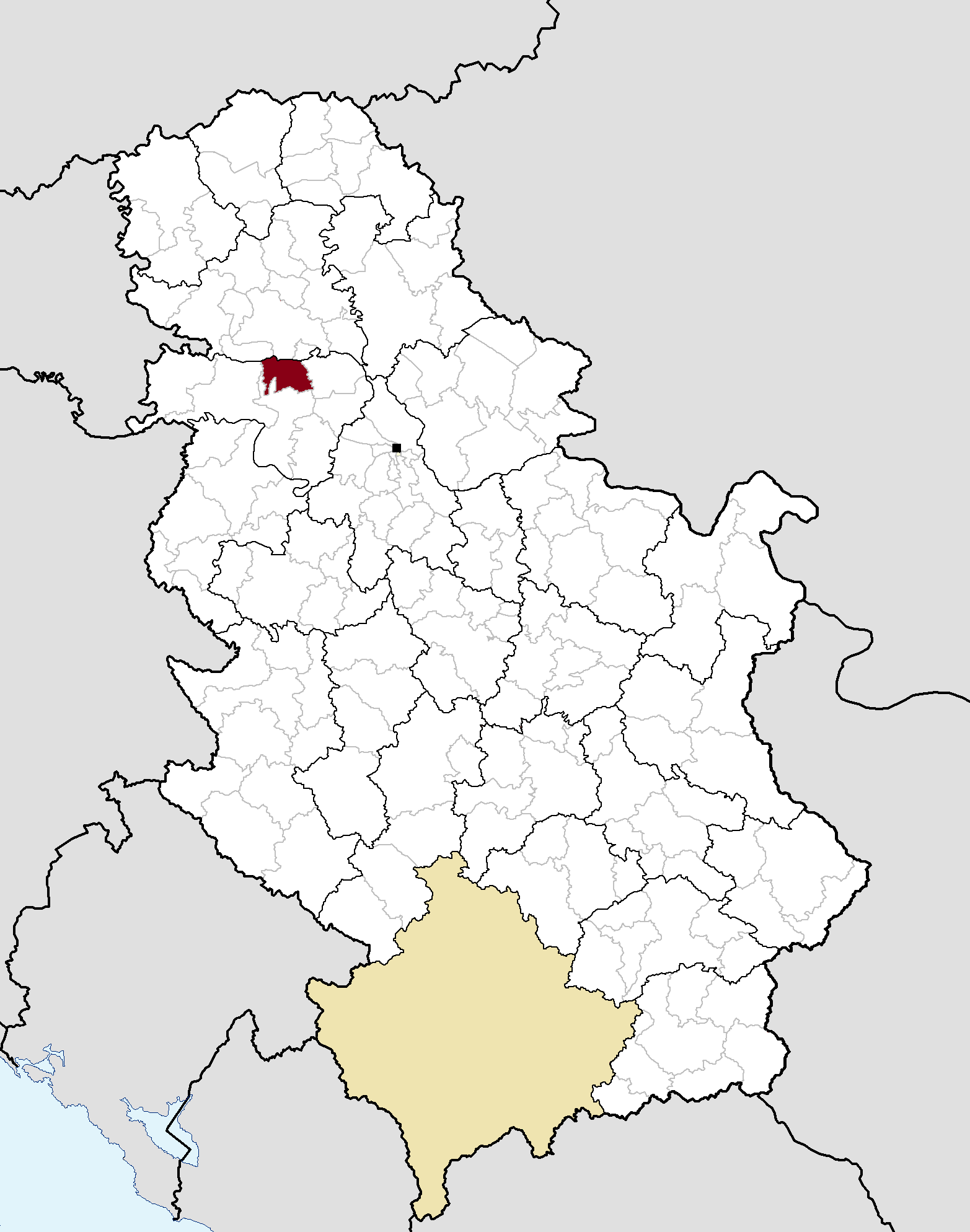
- Location of the municipality of Irig within Serbia
- Coordinates: 45°06′N 19°51′E
- Country: Serbia
- Province: Vojvodina
- District: Srem
- Settlements: 12

Government
  - Mayor: Tihomir Stojaković (SNS)

Area
  - Town: 55.09 km^{2} (21.27 sq mi)
  - Municipality: 230.07 km^{2} (88.83 sq mi)
- Elevation: 190 m (620 ft)

Population (2022 census)
  - Town: 3,901
  - Town density: 70.81/km^{2} (183.4/sq mi)
  - Municipality: 9,290
  - Municipality density: 40.4/km^{2} (105/sq mi)
- Time zone: UTC+1 (CET)
  - Summer (DST): UTC+2 (CEST)
- Postal code: 22406
- Area code: +381(0)22
- Car plates: RU
- Official languages: Serbian (Hungarian language facilities in Dobrodol and Šatrinci)
- Website: www.irig.rs

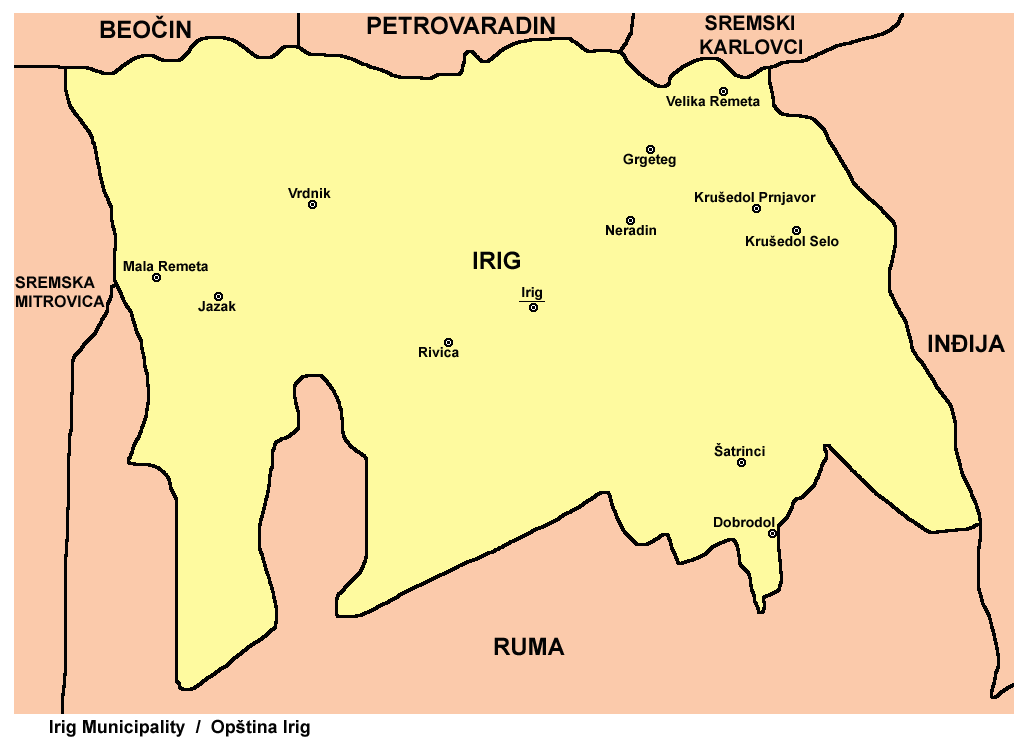
Map of Irig municipality

Irig (Serbian Cyrillic: Ириг, pronounced [ǐriɡ]; Hungarian: Ürög) is a town located in the Srem District of the autonomous province of Vojvodina, Serbia. The town has a population of 4,415, while Irig municipality has 10,866 inhabitants.

== Name ==
In Serbian, the town is known as Irig (Ириг), in Croatian as Irig, in Hungarian as Ireg or Ürög, in German as Irick, in Slovak as Irig, and in Rusyn as Ириґ.

== History ==
Irig was first mentioned in the historical documents in 1225. In the 15th century, the masters of the town were Serbian despots Vuk Grgurević, Đorđe Branković, and Jovan Branković. During the 15th and 16th century, ten Orthodox monasteries were built in the surrounding of Irig (Two of those were located just near the town).

Between 1526 and 1699, the town was under Ottoman administration. During this time, it belonged to the Sanjak of Syrmia, and was the administrative seat of one of the seven nahijas in that sanjak. In 1665, the town had 2,000 houses, one mosque and two monasteries. In this time, Irig was mostly inhabited by Muslim population.

Since 1699, Irig was part of the Habsburg monarchy. In the 18th century, Irig was one of the most important market centers in Srem and most of its inhabitants were Serbs.

In 1795–1796, the population of the town was decimated by plague. Popular local story claims that the patient zero was Anđelija Kuzmanović. She attended her sister's funeral in the village of Krnješevci near Stara Pazova, and brought back with her the plague infested rug to Irig, thus inadvertently spreading the disease. Kuzmanović died from plague on 14 June 1795. Historically, the plague was brought to Zemun by the Ottoman merchants and soldiers in the spring of 1795. Frightened citizens escaped to their relatives on Fruška Gora, spreading the disease.

Austrian authorities didn't try to heal the diseased, except for providing some painkiller medications, as their main goal was to isolate Irig and the surrounding villages as denizens of Irig also fled into the mountain. Punishment for the breaking out of the military imposed quarantine was death. After four months the residents returned only to find the scorched town: out of 912 houses, Austrian authorities burned or demolished 402. From the total population of 4,813, 2,548 died of this disease. It took over 120 years for Irig to reach the 1795 population. In appreciation for establishing the strict border between two towns and preventing the spreading of the plague into the nearby Ruma, citizens of Ruma built the memorial on the location of this "border crossing", made from 800 bricks taken from the demolished houses in Irig, which still stands. Built in 1797 and named "Kipovi" ("Statues"), the monument is protected as the cultural monument.

In the late 19th and early 20th century, Irig was a district capital in the Syrmia County of the Kingdom of Croatia-Slavonia.

According to the 1900 census, the population of the Irig municipality numbered 22,313 inhabitants, of whom 16,893 were Orthodox Serbs, while the town of Irig itself had 5,196 inhabitants, of whom 3,936 were Orthodox Serbs. According to the 1910 census, the population of the Irig municipality numbered 25,320 inhabitants, of whom 18,331 spoke Serbian, 3,552 Hungarian, 1,816 Croatian, and 1,031 German.

Since 1918, Irig was part of the Kingdom of Serbs, Croats and Slovenes (later renamed to Kingdom of Yugoslavia) and subsequent South Slavic and Serb states. During World War II, 417 inhabitants of the town were executed by German fascists.

== Characteristics ==
Located on the southern slopes of Fruška Gora, Irig has a specific microclimate which provides excellent conditions for viticulture.

In the area surrounding Irig, there are 8 monasteries surviving today, built in the 15th and 16th century: Velika Remeta, Krušedol, Staro Hopovo, Mala Remeta, Novo Hopovo, Jazak, Grgeteg and Vrdnik.

Serbian reading-room (Srpska čitaonica) is the oldest Serbian library in Vojvodina. It was founded in 1842 by Dimitrije Krestić, archimandrite of the Krušedol monastery. Originally it was located in three rooms of the local school (two were reading-rooms, one was library). Today it is situated in the Culture House, with 45,000 books, numerous painting, documents and photographs. The library contained first edition of works of Dositej Obradović, oldest editions of the Letopis Matice srpske, etc.

From the earliest days, both local and foreign newspapers (from Belgrade, Serbia, Pest, Croatia, Germany, etc.) could be read in it. During World War II, German soldiers and officers used the library as their quarters. Before their withdrawal, they blew up the building which then burned to the ground. The inhabitants rebuilt it themselves. Over 500 old books were donated by the citizens. The first theatrical shows in Irig were played in 1905.

== Inhabited places ==
Irig municipality includes the town of Irig and the following villages:

- Velika Remeta
- Vrdnik
- Grgeteg
- Dobrodol
- Jazak
- Krušedol Prnjavor
- Krušedol Selo
- Mala Remeta
- Neradin
- Rivica
- Šatrinci

== Demographics ==
Historical population
Year	Pop.	±% p.a.
1948	13,839	—
1953	14,056	+0.31%
1961	14,709	+0.57%
1971	13,678	−0.72%
1981	12,413	−0.97%
1991	11,696	−0.59%
2002	12,329	+0.48%
2011	10,866	−1.39%

According to the 2011 census results, the municipality of Irig has 10,866 inhabitants.

=== Ethnic groups ===
The total population of the Irig municipality is 10,866, which includes:

- Serbs = 8,534 (78.54%)
- Hungarians = 762 (7.01%)
- Croats = 232 (2.14%)
- Roma = 166 (1.53%)
- Others and undeclared = 1,172 (10.79%)

Most of the local communities are ethnically Serb, while two have a Hungarian majority: Šatrinci (Hungarian: Satrinca) and Dobrodol (Hungarian: Dobradópuszta).

== Economy ==
The following table gives a preview of total number of registered people employed in legal entities per their core activity (as of 2018):

Activity	Total
Agriculture, forestry and fishing	158
Mining and quarrying	70
Manufacturing	289
Electricity, gas, steam and air conditioning supply	-
Water supply; sewerage, waste management and remediation activities	52
Construction	61
Wholesale and retail trade, repair of motor vehicles and motorcycles	208
Transportation and storage	89
Accommodation and food services	242
Information and communication	83
Financial and insurance activities	13
Real estate activities	-
Professional, scientific and technical activities	73
Administrative and support service activities	62
Public administration and defense; compulsory social security	129
Education	108
Human health and social work activities	257
Arts, entertainment and recreation	18
Other service activities	35
Individual agricultural workers	151
Total	2,099

== Twin cities ==
- Topolčani, North Macedonia

== See also ==
- List of cities in Serbia
- Municipalities of Serbia
- Syrmia District

== Other sources ==
- Dr Željko Vučković - Stevan Pištević, Povesnica Kulturno-umetničkog društva "Zmaj" u Irigu 1905–2005, Irig, 2005.
- Ladislav Varga, Mozaik žitelja iriških, Novi Sad, 2001.
