= Western Syrmia =

Western Syrmia may refer to:

- in geography, western parts of the region of Syrmia
- in early modern history, western parts of the Syrmia County
- during the Ottoman rule, western parts of the Sanjak of Syrmia
- in modern history, western parts of the Syrmia Oblast
- southeastern part of the Eastern Slavonia, Baranja and Western Syrmia (disambiguation) entity
- in administration, colloquial term for the Vukovar-Syrmia County in Croatia

== See also ==
- Syrmia (disambiguation)
- Eastern Syrmia (disambiguation)
