= Marko Vujatović =

Serbian engraver and woodcarver

Marko Vujatović (Sremska Kamenica, 1775 – Sremski Karlovci, 1825) was a Serbian engraver and master woodcarver in the late Baroque style.

The iconostases of the Serbian Orthodox churches in Grgurevci, Fenek Monastery, Vrdnik, Jazak Monastery, Surčin, Bačka Palanka, Sremski Karlovci, Sremska Mitrovica and Bukovac (sr) are all attributed to Vujatović's ornamental craftsmanship. The church of St. John the Baptist in Bačka Palanka was carved between 1809 and 1814, that is, during the time of the First Serbian Uprising.

He carved the iconostasis of the Church of Saint Nicholas in Šimanovci in 1814.

== See also ==
- Arsenije and Aksentije Marković
