= Eastern Syrmia =

Eastern Syrmia may refer to:

- in geography, eastern parts of the region of Syrmia
- in early modern history, eastern parts of the Syrmia County
- during the Ottoman rule, eastern parts of the Sanjak of Syrmia
- in modern history, eastern parts of the Syrmia Oblast
- in administration, colloquial term for the Syrmia District in Serbia

== See also ==
- Syrmia (disambiguation)
- Western Syrmia (disambiguation)
