= Srem (disambiguation) =

Srem is a region of Serbia and Croatia.

Srem may also refer to:

== In Serbia ==
- Srem District
- FK Srem, a football club
- Sanjak of Srem (Ottoman-era)
- Kingdom of Srem (mediaeval)
- Eparchy of Srem
- Historical Archive of Srem
- Museum of Srem

== Elsewhere ==
- Śrem, several places in Poland
- Srem (village), a village in Bulgaria
- Srem Gap, in Antarctica

== See also ==
- Syrmia (disambiguation)
