= Bishopric of Syrmia =

The term Bishopric of Syrmia (also Srem, or Srijem) may refer to:

- Serbian Orthodox Bishopric of Syrmia, an Eastern Orthodox diocese of the Serbian Orthodox Church
- Roman Catholic Bishopric of Syrmia, one of dioceses of Roman Catholic Church, Serbia

== See also ==
- Syrmia
- Diocese of Syrmia (disambiguation)
- Eastern Orthodoxy in Serbia
- Catholic Church in Serbia
