= Jazak Monastery =

Monastery in Serbia

Coordinates: 45°06′17″N 19°46′14″E

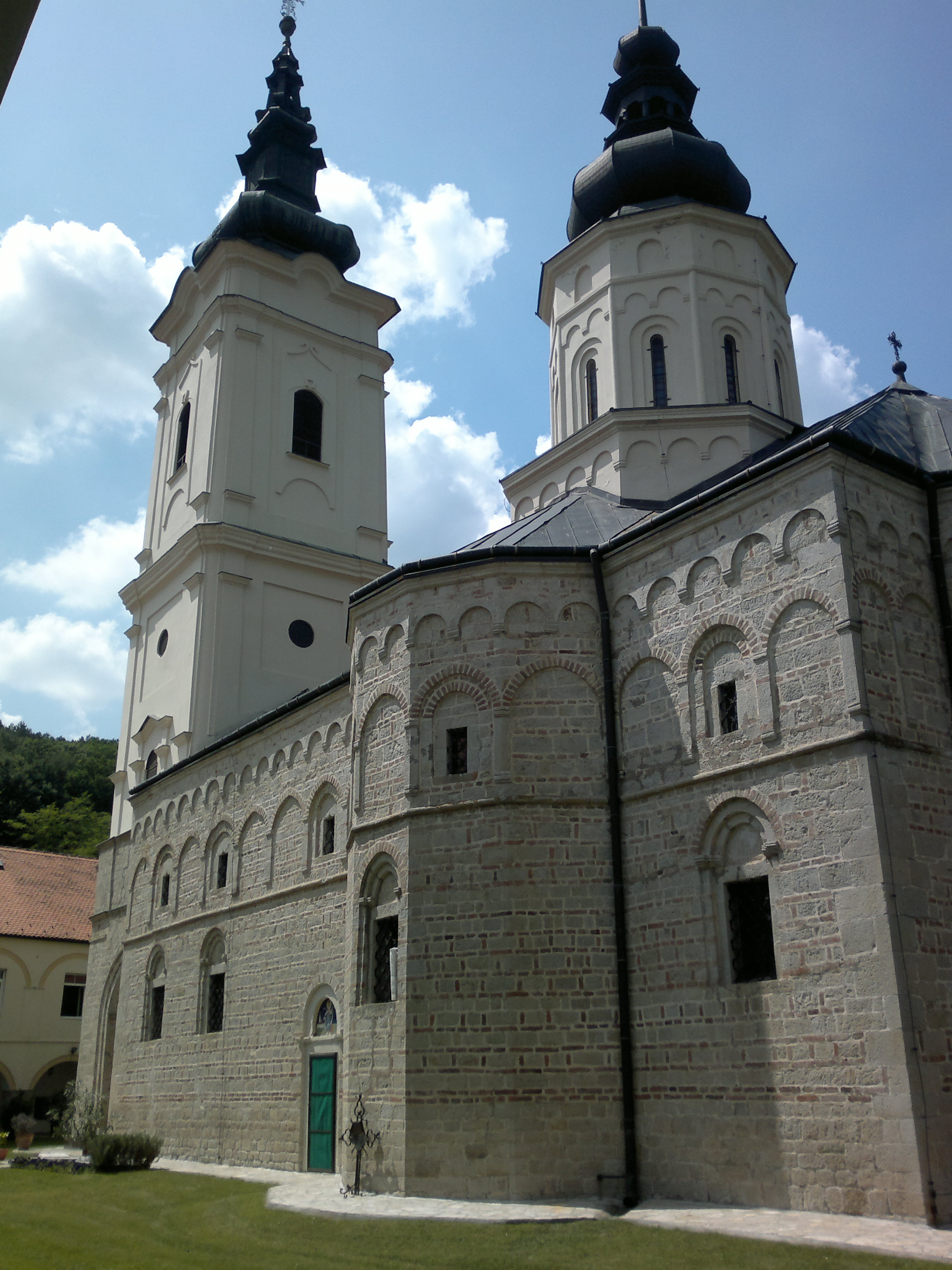
Jazak Monastery

The Jazak Monastery (Serbian: Манастир Јазак, romanized: Manastir Jazak) is a Serb Orthodox monastery on the Fruška Gora mountain in the northern Serbia, in the province of Vojvodina. The monastery was founded in 1736. The icons on the baroque iconostasis were painted in 1769 by Dimitrije Bačević and the carved woodwork was attributed to engraver Marko Vujatović. An overall reconstruction of the monastery was carried out from 1926 to 1930.

Jazak Monastery was declared Monument of Culture of Exceptional Importance in 1990, and it is protected by the state.

== Burials ==
- Stefan Uroš V

== See also ==
- List of Serbian Orthodox monasteries
