= Vićentije Rakić =

Serbian writer, poet, priest and philanthropist

Vićentije Rakić (29 April 1750 – 29 March 1818) was a Serbian writer, poet, priest, philanthropist and a disciple of Dositej Obradović. He founded the School of Theology (now part of the University of Belgrade) when in 1810 he headed a newly established theological college and in 1812 the first students graduated from it.

== Biography ==
Born in 1750 in Zemun into a religious Serbian family, Rakić was baptized Vasilije on 29 April that year at Zemun, according to the customs of the Serbian Orthodox Church. After provincial schooling, he married and opened up a business selling merchandise.

Tragedy then struck: his wife died in 1785. That same year he sold his house, business, and went to the Fenek Monastery, where Abbot Sofronije Stefanović gave him his monastic name of Vićentije after being tonsured on 9 April 1786. That year he was ordained deacon at Karlovci by Ćirilo Živković, and priest by Vladika Stefan Stratimirović, and appointed to a parish at Šabac, where he delivered sermons for which, along with Život Aleksije čoveka Božiega, written in verse, he became recognized as a promising orator and author. He had no leanings towards a scholarship at first; however, his curiosity was always wide-ranging and various rather than particular and constant. At any rate, his studies supplied him with that fund of general knowledge he was later to say was indispensable for a writer and poet and with fondness and respect for those authors he would later emulate, namely Dositej Obradović.

On 9 January 1796, he became the abbot of Fenek monastery, but three years later he left for Trieste, Italy. From 1799 to 1810 he lived and worked there as the parish priest of the Serbian Orthodox Church, looking after the spiritual needs of the Serbian and Greek congregation of St. Spyridon. At about the same time as the first Greek Karamanlidic translation of Abraham's Sacrifice was issued, Rakić translated the text into Serbian and published it in 1799. Rakić was fluent in Greek, having attended a Greek school in his native town of Zemun and his position in Trieste probably helped him come into contact with some of the Venetian editions of the Greek Sacrifice, albeit Abraham's Sacrifice. The Serbian translation was reprinted at least twelve times until 1907 and apparently was widely read.

Sometime shortly after his sixtieth year, Rakić himself fell under the influence of Dositej Obradović, and thereafter his life in Trieste was never the same. He translated Italian authors, particularly Luigi Groto. He then went to join Obradović in Karađorđe's Serbia after the city of Belgrade was liberated from Turkish occupation.

Rakić's first editor and biographer, Obradović, made ample use of his letters to unfold Rakić's life in a monograph. Obradović, now Minister of Education, summoned Rakić from Trieste to help him establish both a university (Velika škola in 1808) and a theological college (in 1810). A letter by Obradović to the Very Reverend Vićentije Rakić, dated in late 1809, motivated Rakić, a professor of Pedagogy at the Faculty of Philosophy of the Velika škola in Belgrade, to fulfill his life's ambition by organizing a newly founded theological college in Belgrade and preparing students for the priesthood. In 1812 the first group of priests educated in the liberated country of Serbia graduated and thereafter restored and reconstructed their destroyed institutions.

After the re-conquest of Serbia by the Turks in 1813, Rakić left Belgrade and went back to Fenek Monastery, in Srem, where he died on 29 March 1818.

His theological and moral writings were aimed at saving God from the atheists and even deists, and man from the skeptical philosophers.

== Bibliography ==
- Pravilo molebnoje ko presvetoj Bogorodici, i prepodnjoj Paraskevi srpskoj, written and published in Buda, 1798
- Istorija manastira Feneka, written in Trieste in 1798, printed in Buda, 1799
- Žertva Avramova, ili sobesedovanje grešnika s Bogomateriju, s grčkog, printed in Buda, 1799; second printing in Vienna, 1833; III, in Belgrade, 1835, IV, 1856, V - 1803
- Cvet dobrodetelji, from Greek (Buda,1800)
- Pravilo Sv Spiridona (Venice, 1802)
- Žitije svetogo velikomučenika Jevstatija Plakide, i svetago Spiridona čudotvorca, written in verse, and printed in Buda, 1803
- Žitije prekrasnoga Josifa, written in verse (Venice, 1804)
- Istorija o razorenju Jerusalima i o vzjatiji Konstantinopolja (Venice, 1804)
- Ljestvica imuštaja pedeset stepnej (Venice, 1805)
- Čudesi presvetija Bogorodici, from Greek, written in Trieste and published in Venice in 1808
- Žitije Vasilija Velikiga, in verse (Venice, 1808)
- Propovedi za nedelje i praznike (Venice, 1809)
- Besedovnik iliričesko-italijanski (Venice, 1810)
- Beseda o duvanu (Venice, 1810)
- Žitije Stevana Prvovenčanog, written in Šabac in 1791, and printed in Buda in 1813
- Pesan istorijski o žitiju Aleksija čeloveka Božiji, written in verse, and printed in Belgrade in 1835

== Sources ==
- Milićević, Milan Đ. (1888). Časovi odmora, vol 1: 16. Beograd: Srpska kraljevska štamparija.
- Skerlić, Jovan (1921). Istorija srpske književnosti. Beograd.
