= Syrmia (disambiguation) =

Syrmia is a region of Serbia and Croatia.

Syrmia may refer to:

== Contemporary ==
- Vukovar-Syrmia County, a county in Croatia
- Syrmia District, a district in Serbia
- Diocese of Syrmia (disambiguation)

== Historic ==
- Sirmium, influential ancient city founded by Illyrians and Celts before 300 BC, capital of Illyricum, destroyed by the Avars in 582 AD. Site of modern Sremska Mitrovica in Serbia.
- Byzantine Syrmia (disambiguation)
- Theme of Sirmium (1018–1071), Byzantine administrative unit
- Syrmia (former county) (12th century-1521, 1745–1848, 1860–1924), initially an administrative unit of the medieval Kingdom of Hungary, and later administrative unit of several Habsburg lands (Kingdom of Slavonia, Kingdom of Croatia, Kingdom of Croatia-Slavonia, Kingdom of Hungary), as well as administrative unit of the Kingdom of Serbs, Croats and Slovenes. Covered historical Upper Syrmia.
- Duchy of Syrmia (disambiguation)
- Kingdom of Syrmia (1282–1325), an independent Serb kingdom centered in historical Lower Syrmia (today known as Mačva). According to some sources, it also included Upper Syrmia.
- Sanjak of Syrmia (1541–1699), an administrative unit of the Ottoman Empire. Covered Upper Syrmia.
- In the past, term Lower Syrmia was a designation for the region of Mačva in Serbia. Northern part of Mačva is now located within modern Srem District.

== See also ==
- Eastern Slavonia, Baranja and Western Syrmia (disambiguation)
- United Nations Transitional Administration for Eastern Slavonia, Baranja and Western Syrmia, a UN peacekeeping mission in eastern parts of Croatia
- Srem (disambiguation)
