= Byzantine Syrmia =

Byzantine Syrmia may refer to:

- Pannonia (Byzantine province) (567-582), first rule of the Byzantine Empire in the region of Syrmia
- Sirmium (theme), second rule of the Byzantine Empire in the region of Syrmia, from c. 1018 to c. 1071
- Byzantine Syrmia (1167-1180), third rule of the Byzantine Empire in the region of Syrmia

== See also ==
- Syrmia (disambiguation)
- Byzantine (disambiguation)
- Duchy of Syrmia (disambiguation)
