= Turkish Springs in Stari Ledinci =

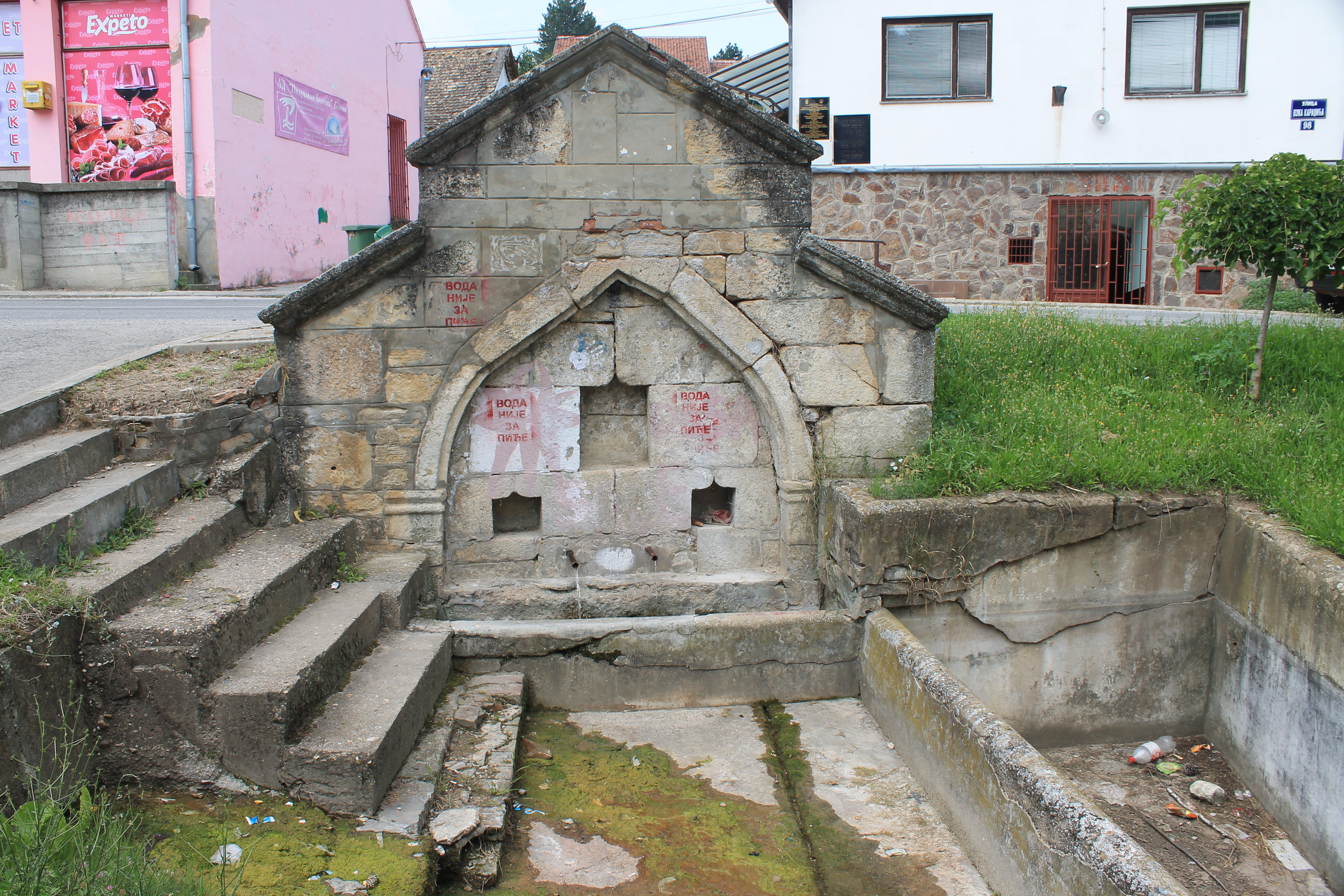
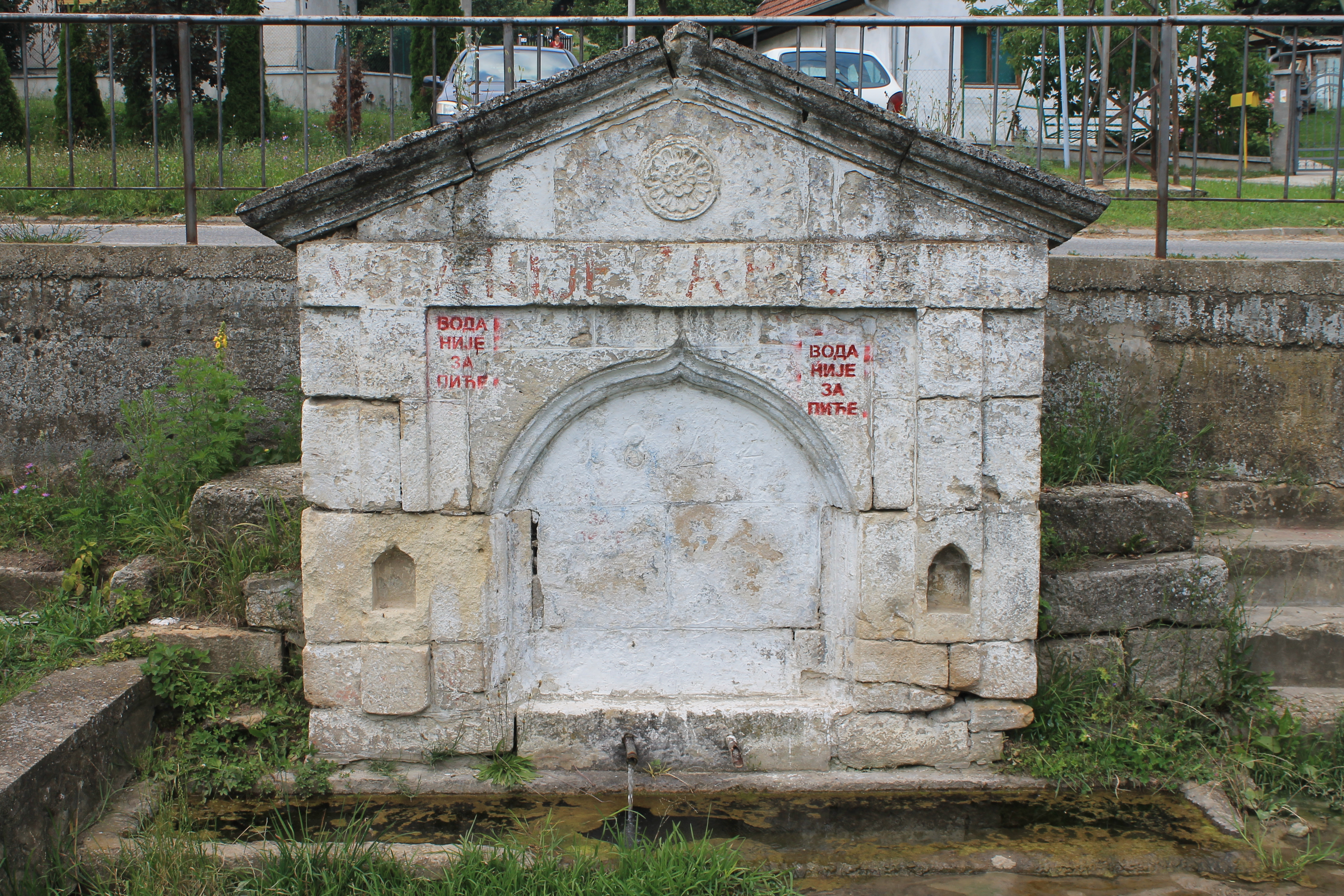
- Interactive map of the Turkish Springs in Stari Ledinci area

General information
- Status: Cultural
- Type: water spring
- Architectural style: Ottoman architecture
- Location: Stari Ledinci
- Coordinates: 45°11′08″N 19°48′14″E

Turkish Springs in Stari Ledinci are one of the last traces of the Ottoman Empire period architecture in the northern Serbian region of Vojvodina. The areas north of Sava and Danube river, which at the time were part of Ottoman Hungary, were reconquered by the Habsburg monarchy already at the end of the Great Turkish War and the signing of the 1699 Treaty of Karlowitz, significantly before the independence of the Principality of Serbia, which led to preservation of significantly lesser number of artefacts from the Ottoman period in the region. Springs still standing in the village were reconstructed in 1842 and another one in 1885. Today, both springs are protected cultural monuments.

Systematic demolition of all symbols of Islam happened in the late 17th century after the region of southern Ottoman Hungary was reconquered by the Habsburg monarchy with the practice less all encompassing at future stages of what some called the Balkan Reconquista.

== See also ==
- Rumelia
- Sanjak of Syrmia
- Ottoman monuments of Ilok
- Ottoman Serbia
