= Ottoman monuments of Ilok =

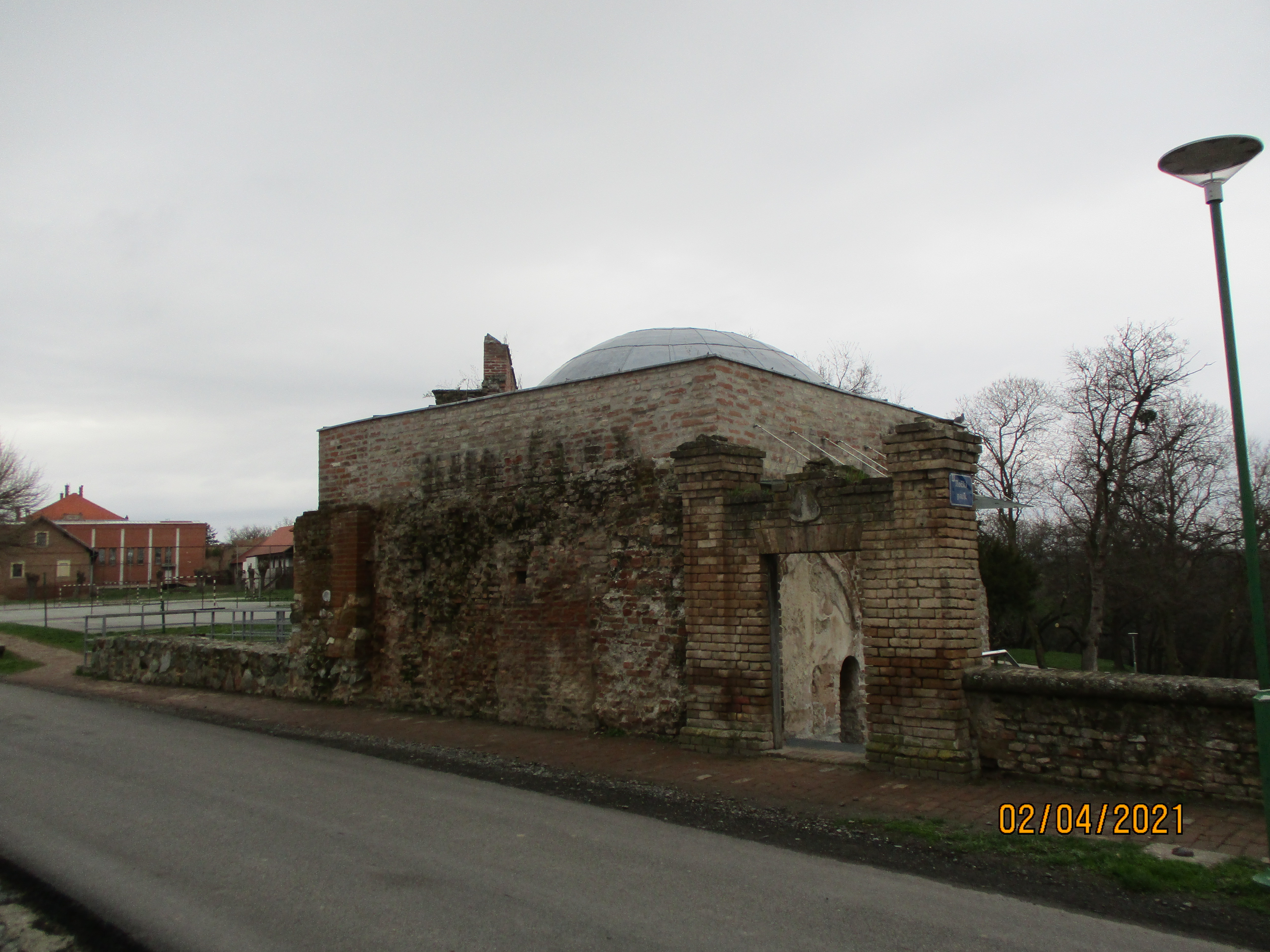
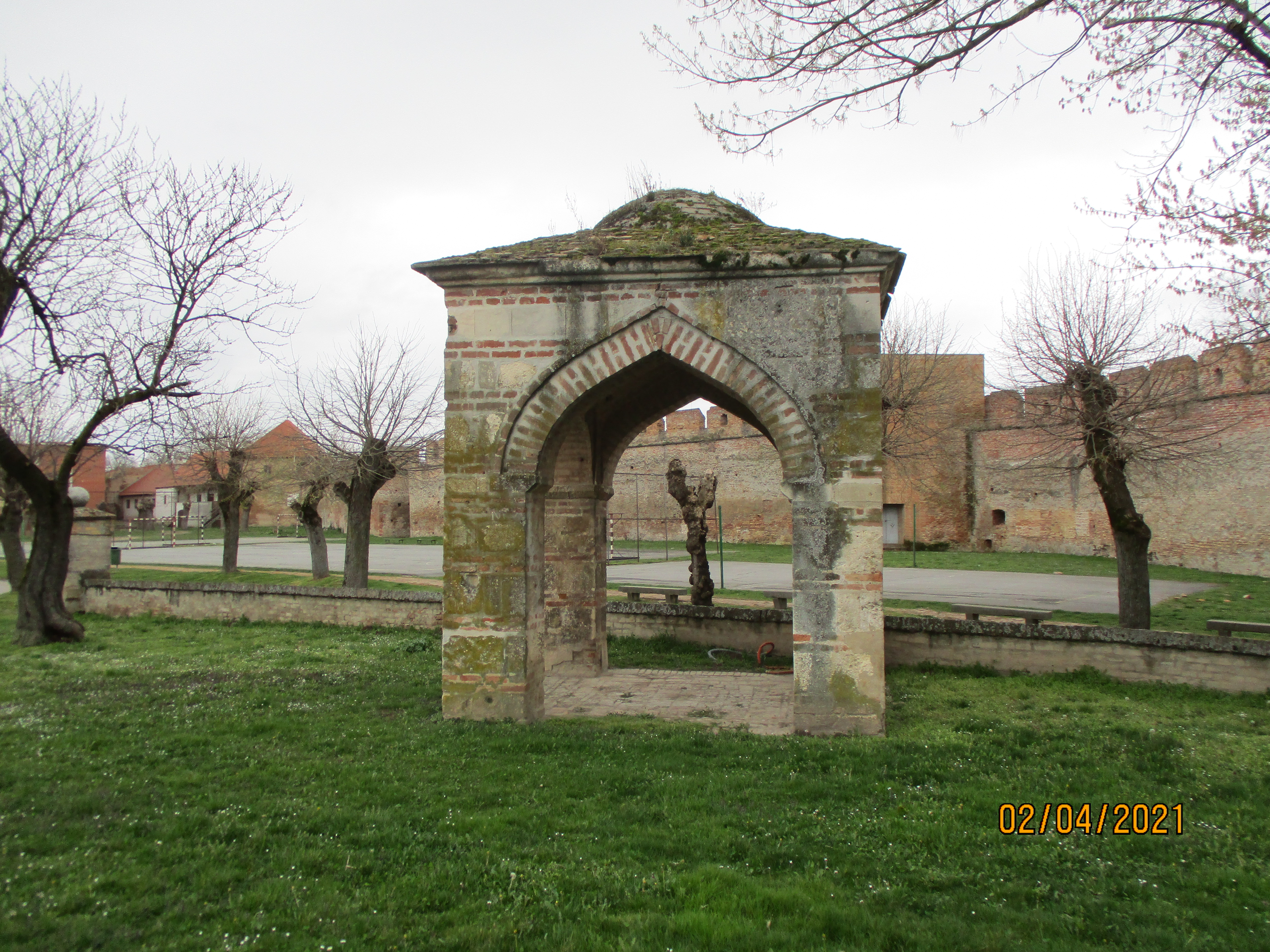

General information
- Status: Cultural
- Type: hammam and the türbe
- Architectural style: Ottoman architecture
- Location: Ilok

The remaining Ottoman Empire era monuments of Ilok, a town in eastern Croatia makes the town the location with the largest number of preserved Ottoman buildings in Slavonia. The hammam in Ilok is the only preserved Ottoman era hammam in Croatia. Evliya Çelebi, an Ottoman explorer who travelled through the Empire, described the hammam of Ilok in his recollections from the town.

Together with Požega, Ilok gained town status when the Ottomans ruled over the area. The town of Ilok was together with Sremska Mitrovica, one of the seats of the Sanjak of Syrmia of the Budin Eyalet. Destruction of all symbols of Islam happened in the late 17th century after the region of southern Ottoman Hungary was reconquered by the Habsburg monarchy, making the monuments in Ilok some of the last architectural traces of the Ottoman era in modern day Croatia.

== See also ==
- Suleiman Bridge
- Gunja Mosque
- Rumelia
- Hundred Years' Croatian–Ottoman War
- Great Turkish War
  - Croatian-Slavonian-Dalmatian theater in Great Turkish War
- Edward Rehatsek
- Turkish Springs in Stari Ledinci
