= Duchy of Syrmia =

Duchy of Syrmia or Syrmian Duchy may refer to:

- Syrmian Duchy of Sermon, a duchy in the region of Syrmia, ruled by duke Sermon (c. 1018)
- Syrmian Duchy of John Angelos, a duchy in the region of Syrmia, ruled by duke John Angelos (first half of the 13th century)
- Syrmian Duchy of Radoslav Čelnik, a duchy in the region of Syrmia, ruled by duke Radoslav Čelnik (c. 1527-1530)
- Syrmian Duchy of the Odescalchi, designation for feudal domain of Odescalchi ducal family in the region of Syrmia

== See also ==
- Syrmia (disambiguation)
- Byzantine Syrmia (disambiguation)
