= Arsenije and Aksentije Marković =

Eighteenth-century master woodcarvers from Vojvodina, children of Marko Gavrilovic

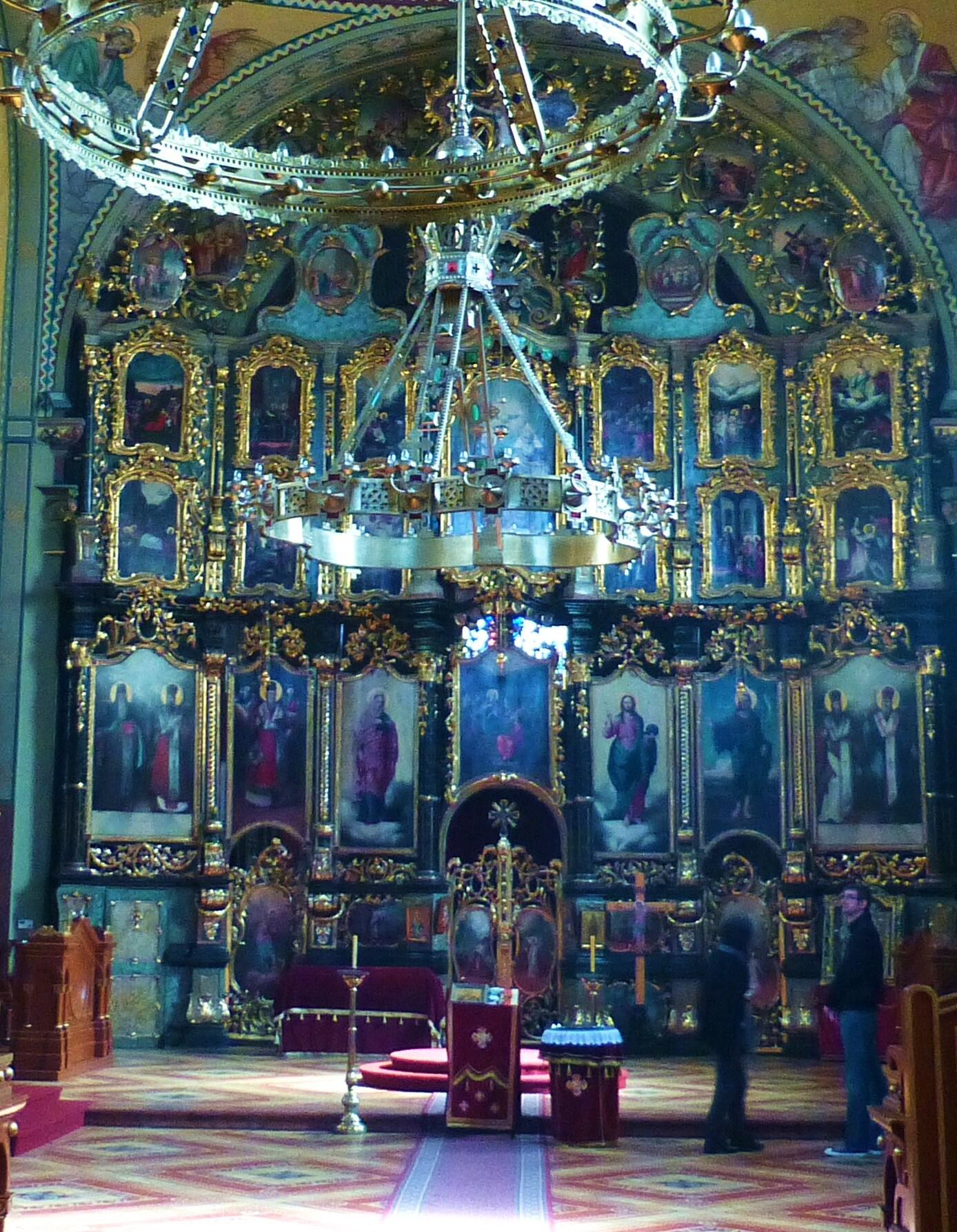
Iconostasis of the Sremski Karlovci Orthodox Cathedral by Arsenije Marković

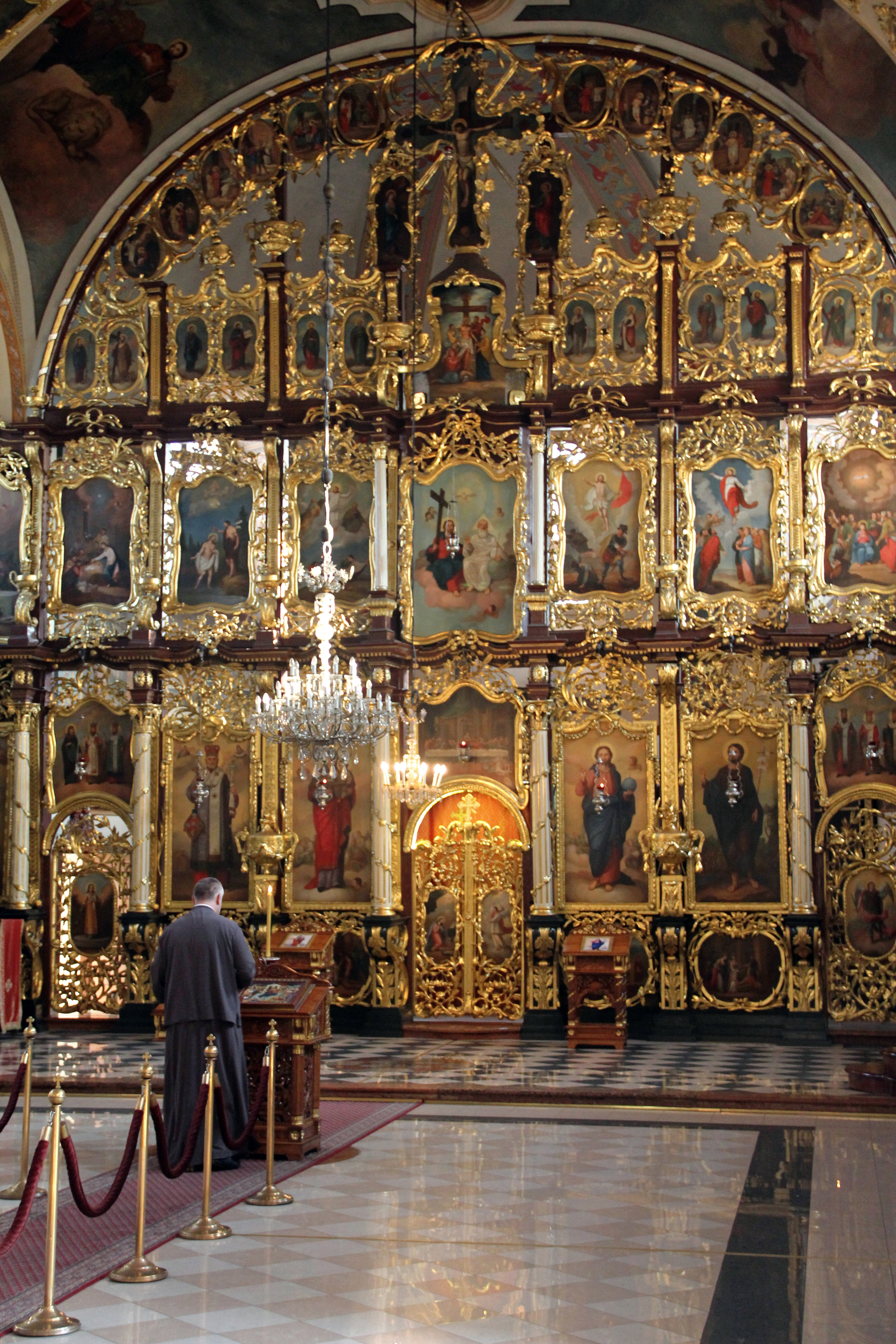
Iconostasis of the Church of the Holy Virgin, Zemun by Aksentije Marković

Arsenije and Aksentije Marković are the two most important eighteenth-century master woodcarvers in Vojvodina who hail from Novi Sad. The two brothers learned the craft of woodcarving and inherited the talent from their father and teacher Marko Gavrilović. Arsenije's most important work is the iconostasis in the Cathedral Church in the Metropolitanate of Karlovci. The outstanding iconostasis in the Assumption Church in Novi Sad is also attributed to him. His brother Aksentije did the iconostasis in the Church of the Holy Virgin in Zemun (1766) and the iconostasis in the Cathedral Church in Vršac (1797). According to art historian Dejan Medaković "Arsenije is a distinctly baroque artist, with discerning rococo tendencies especially obvious in the frequent use of the rose motif. At the same time in Aksentije's work, there are already positive signs of the modern neo-classical tendencies: laurel wreaths, oak leaves, with or without acorns, amphorae, vessels on consoles over the architrave or acroterions on top of the iconostasis. "Aksentije Marković made Noah's sacrifice for the tower of Almaška Church in Novi Sad, otherwise a very rare plastic ornament on Serbian Orthodox churches.

== See also ==
- List of painters from Serbia
- Serbian art
- Marko Vujatović
