= Church of the Nativity of the Theotokos, Zemun =

Coordinates: 44.84°N 20.41°E

Church of the Nativity of the Theotokos
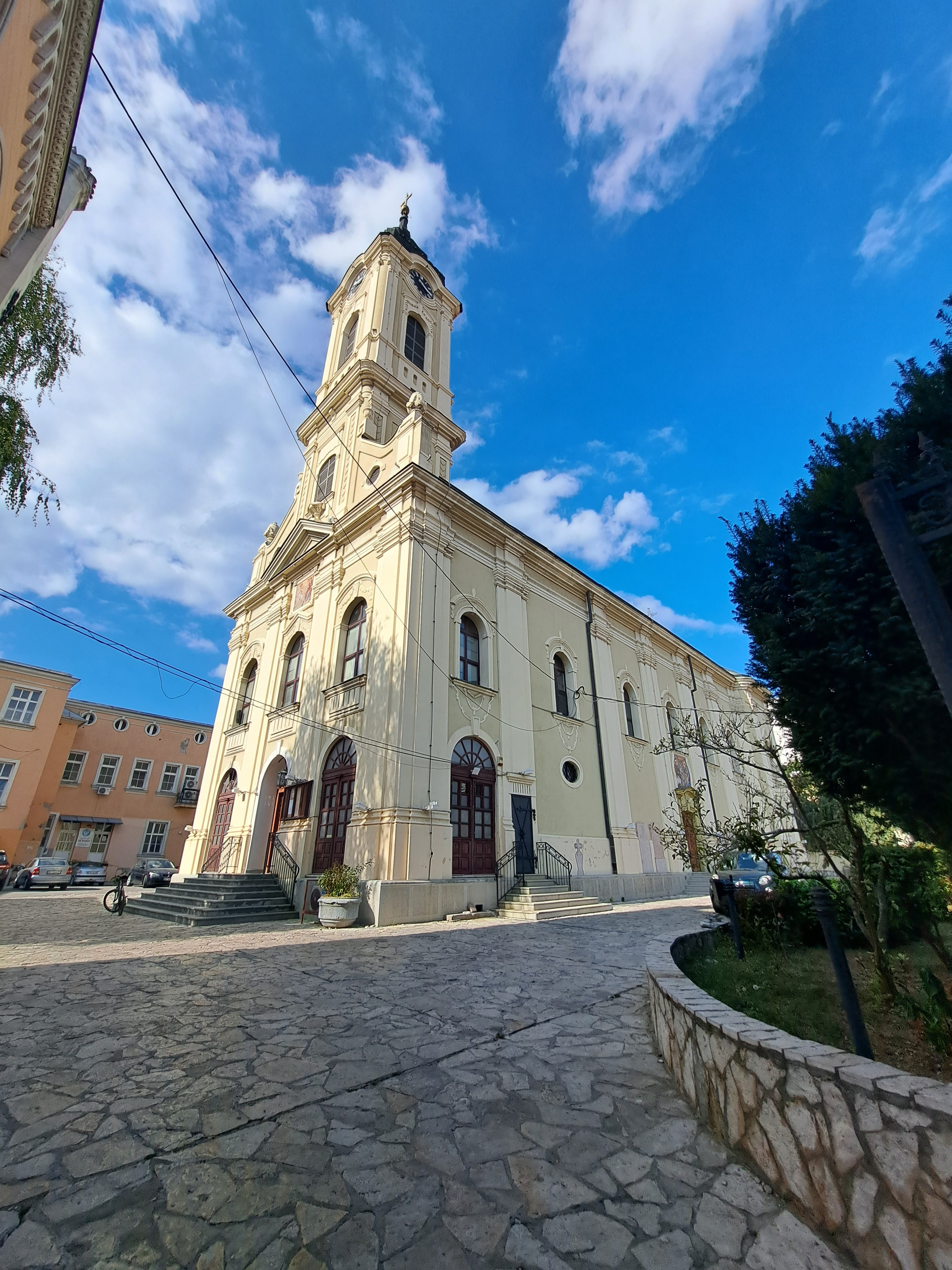
- Interactive map of the Church of the Nativity of the Theotokos area

General information
- Type: Cultural monument
- Location: Zemun, Belgrade, Serbia
- Completed: 1774

The Church of the Nativity of the Theotokos (Serbian: Црква рођења Пресвете Богородице, romanized: Crkva rođenja Presvete Bogorodice) known also as The Church of the Theotokos (Serbian: Богородичина црква, romanized: Bogorodičina crkva) is a Serbian Orthodox church located in the center of the Zemun district in Belgrade.

== History ==
Following the Treaty of Passarowitz and the Treaty of Belgrade, the Turkish authorities were removed from southeastern Syrmia, and Zemun found itself on the border of two empires:Austria and Turkey. After several changes in policies, the military-civil government was established as an authority, which is how Zemun became a part of Austria and its military border became a free military community. Years of peace that followed allowed the rapid economic growth and development of the citizens, merchants, and craftsmen. The progress of the border city was reflected in the increase in population, the construction of public and private houses, and expanding settlements which were inhabited by Serbs, Germans, Јews, Greeks, Aromanians and other nationalities. The cornerstone for a new Orthodox church was laid in the summer of 1776 at the western part of the old core of Zemun developed at the beginning of the eighteenth century, whose construction was financed by Serbian and Greek residents of Zemun. The church was completed in 1780.

== Description ==
The church is a one-nave late Baroque building with a semicircular apse and shallow choirs, which received a high bell tower on the west side in the late eighteenth century which was only slightly lower than the tower of the nearby church of the Blessed Virgin Mary. The first bell, which was set up in 1815, illustrated the victory over Napoleon. Later, two more bells were set up besides the first bell. A rare depository designed for the safekeeping of body relics is buried beneath the bell tower, never was used for that purpose. It was designed according to the rules, which are still respected primarily in the monasteries of the Greek orthodox church. Sources state that the "new" church, as it was called by locals, served the religious needs of Greeks, Aromanians and Serbs who shared the same religion, all of them giving contributions for its maintenance. The ceremonies were conducted in Church Slavonic, and on certain days (until 1914) in Greek as well. The temple and its courtyard became the center of the religious, educational and cultural activities of Zemun Serbs during the 19th century. The church was significantly rebuilt in 1890, 1937, 1999, and in 2009, it received decorative lighting. The liturgy in the church was repeatedly served by patriarchs of the Serbian Orthodox Church.

== Architecture ==
The Church of the Nativity of the Theotokos is the largest church in the old part of Zemun, with one nave, shallow choir areas and a slender two-story bell tower which rises from the west facade. It has a richly carved baroque iconostasis which was carved by the woodcutter Aksentije Marković, with icons painted by the renowned and prolific iconographer and classical painter, Arsenije Teodorović. The bell and iconostasis were set during the same year. Teodorović painted the murals on the first vault below the iconostasis and on the first arc in front of the altar. The icons showed a depiction of Sveti Sava reconciling his brothers over his father's grave.

The church has a rich treasury, library, and archive, which includes the 1782 Gospel of Moscow with illustrations of Hadži Ruvim, Archimandrite of Monastery Bogovađa and Monastery Voljavčefrom the year 1788.

The church was restored from 2000 to 2001, during which the murals were restored and a new floor was installed with a heating system beneath. The church is compared with the Home of the Serbian Church Municipality, with which it shares the same lot.

== Gallery ==
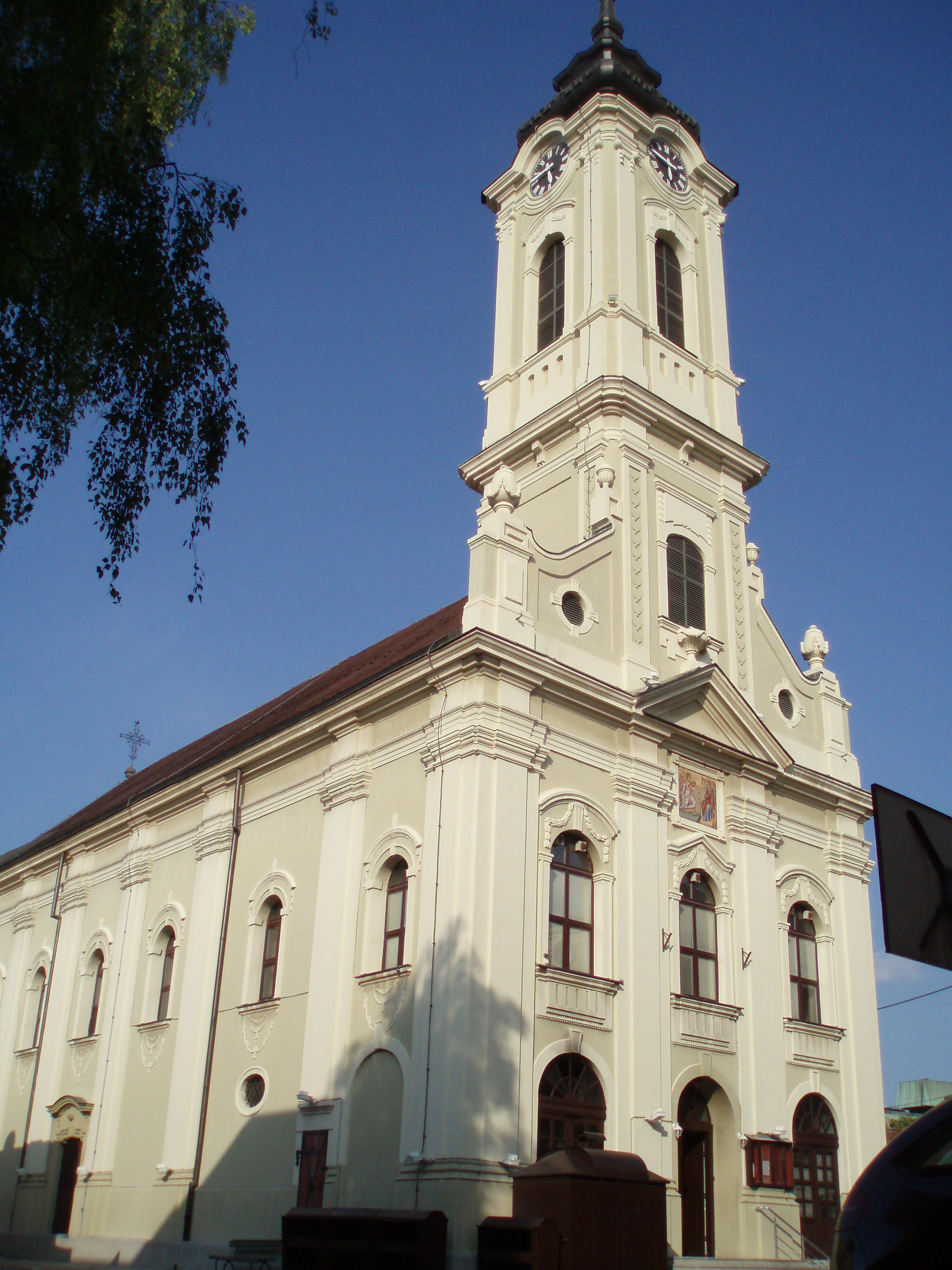
The front facade with a bell tower (1880)

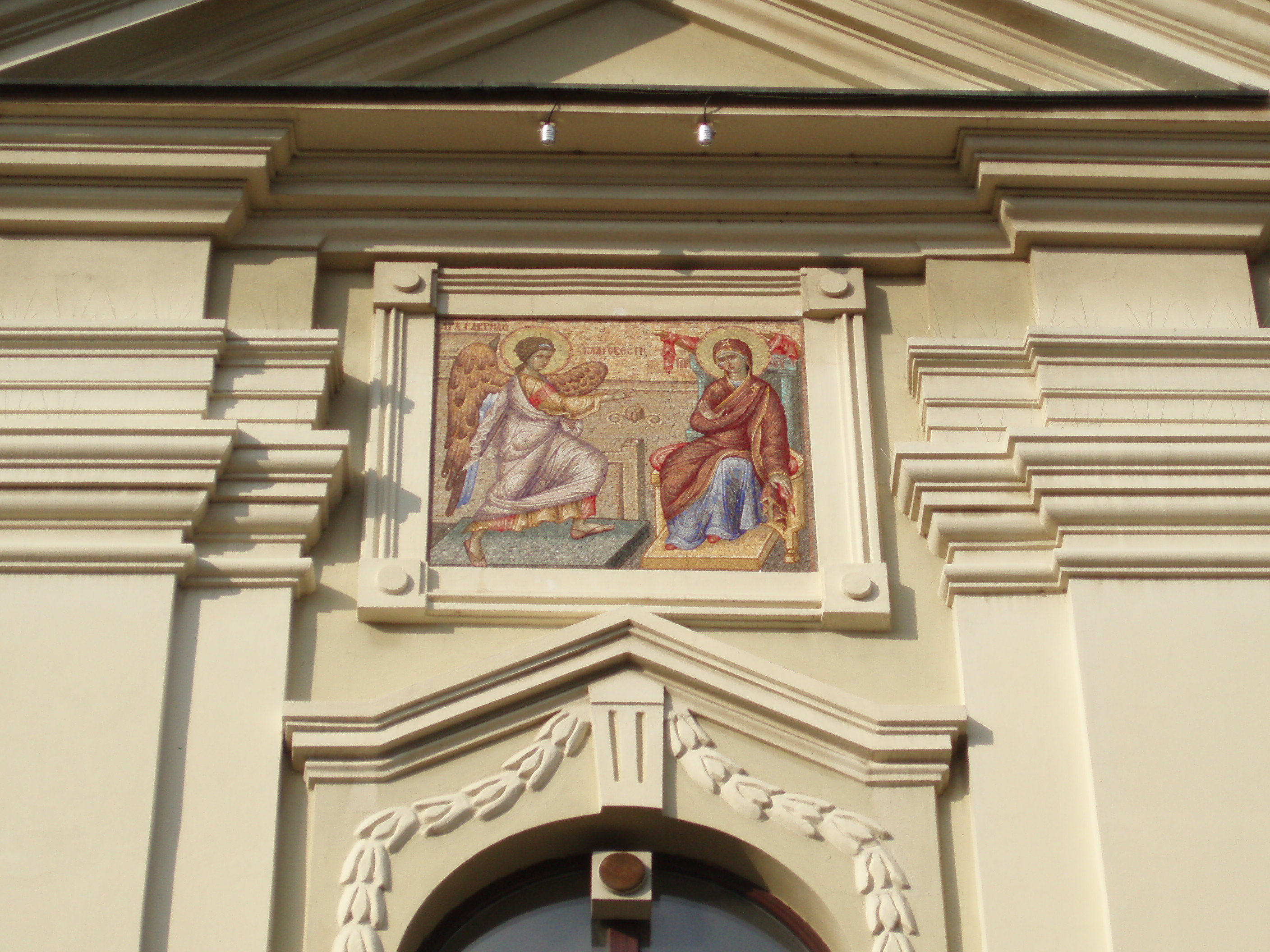
Mosaic on the front facade of the church

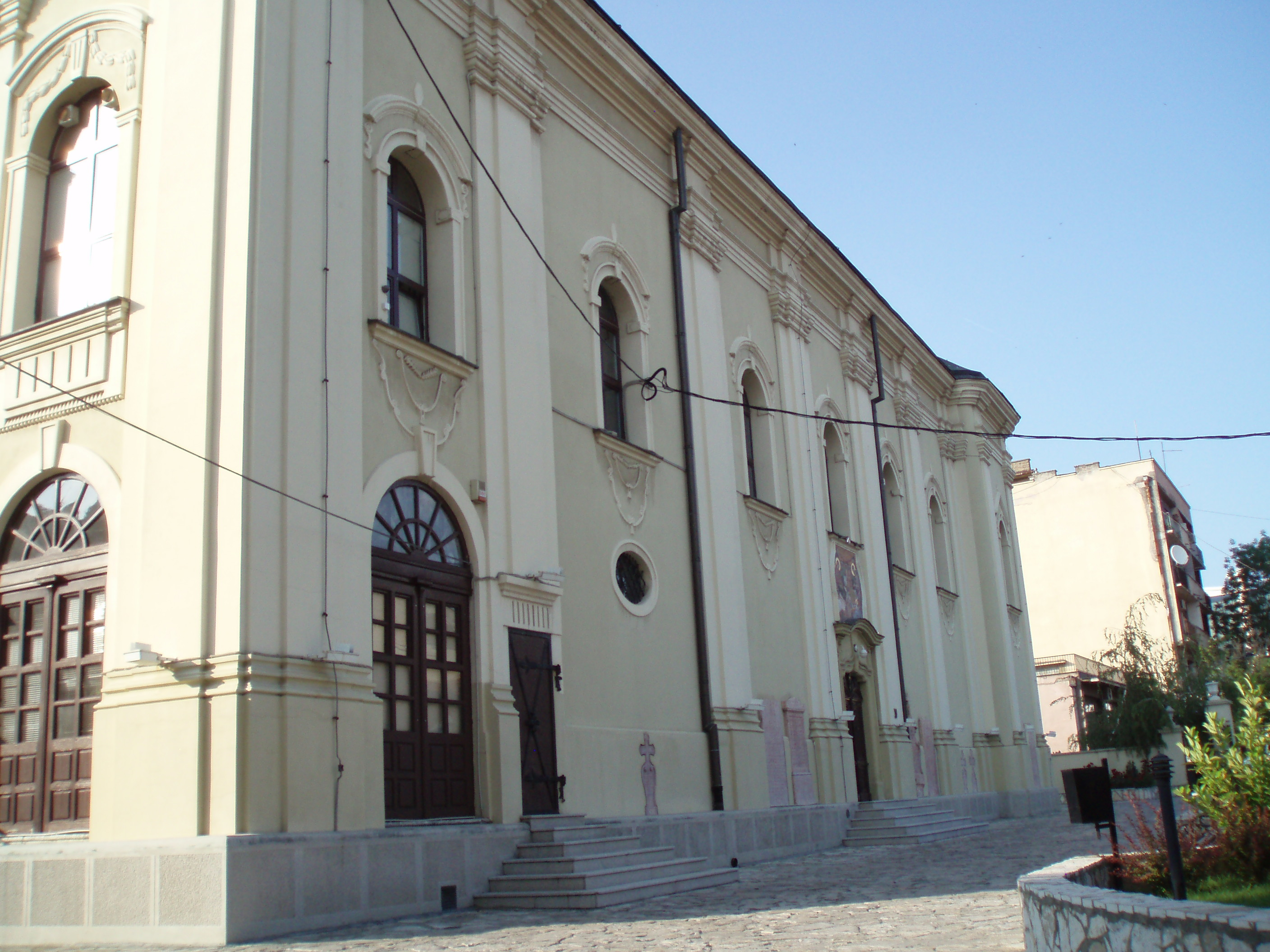
Lateral facade of the church

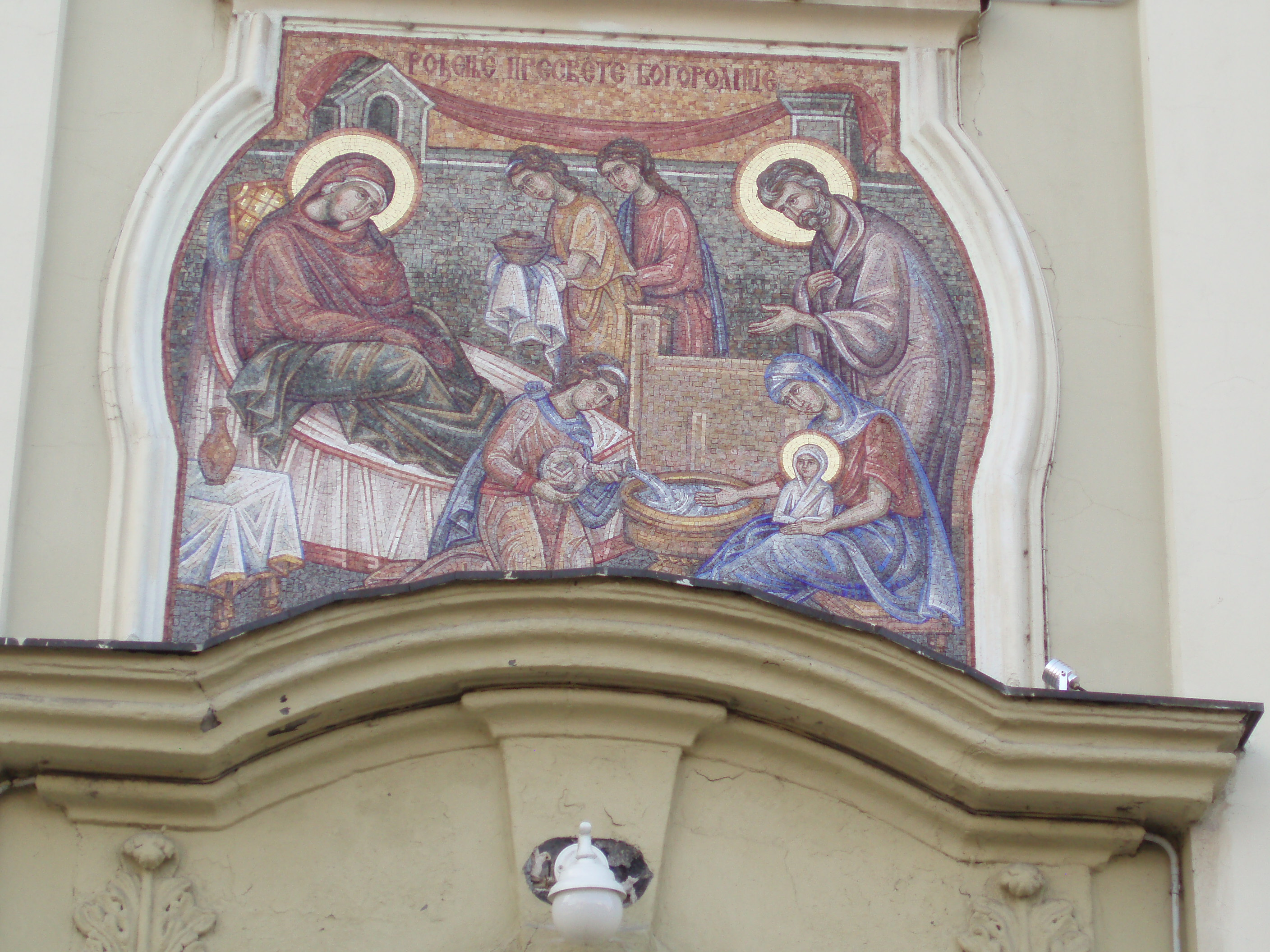
Mosaic on the lateral facade of the church

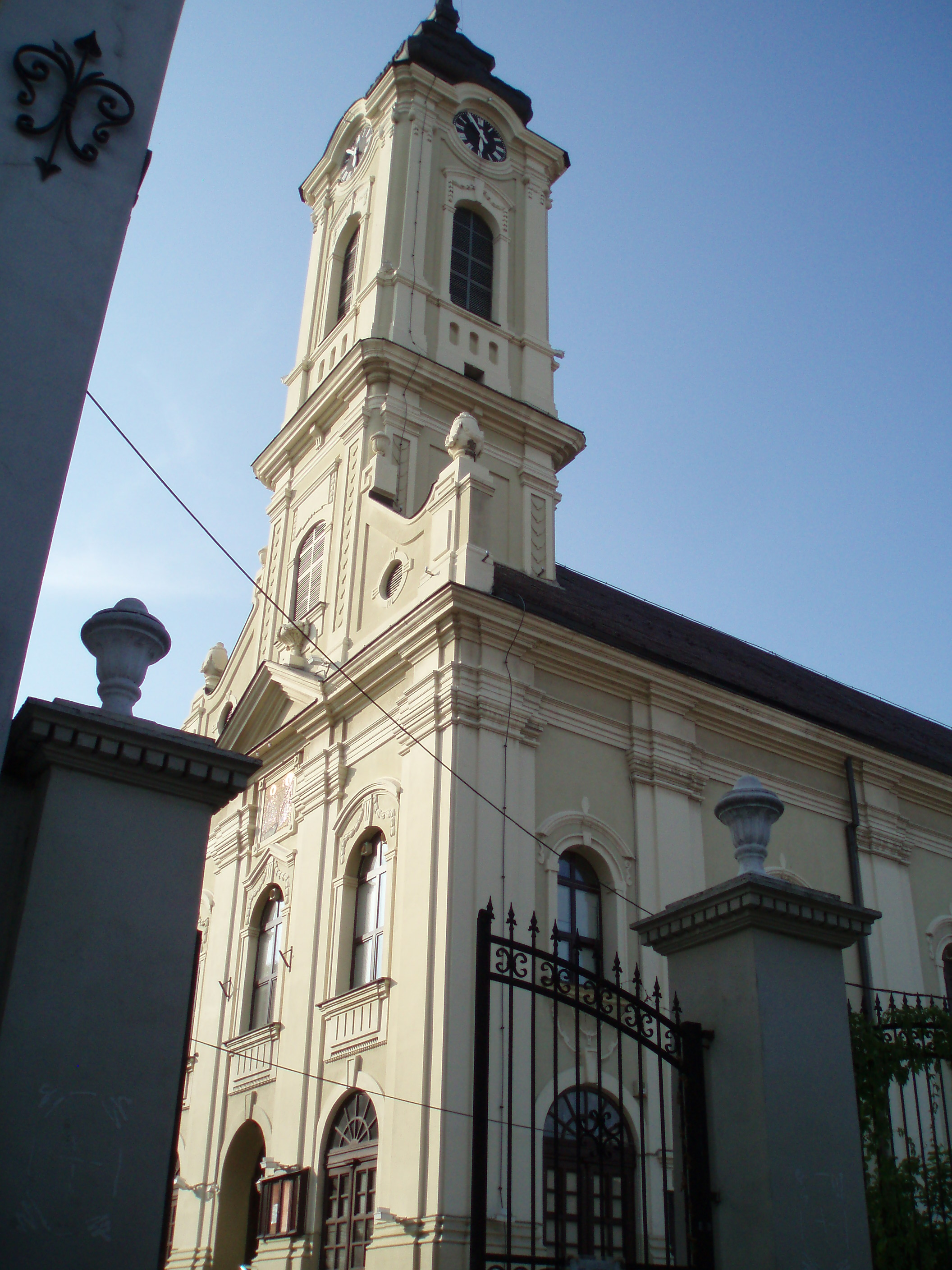
Upgraded part of the church with a bell tower and depositarium

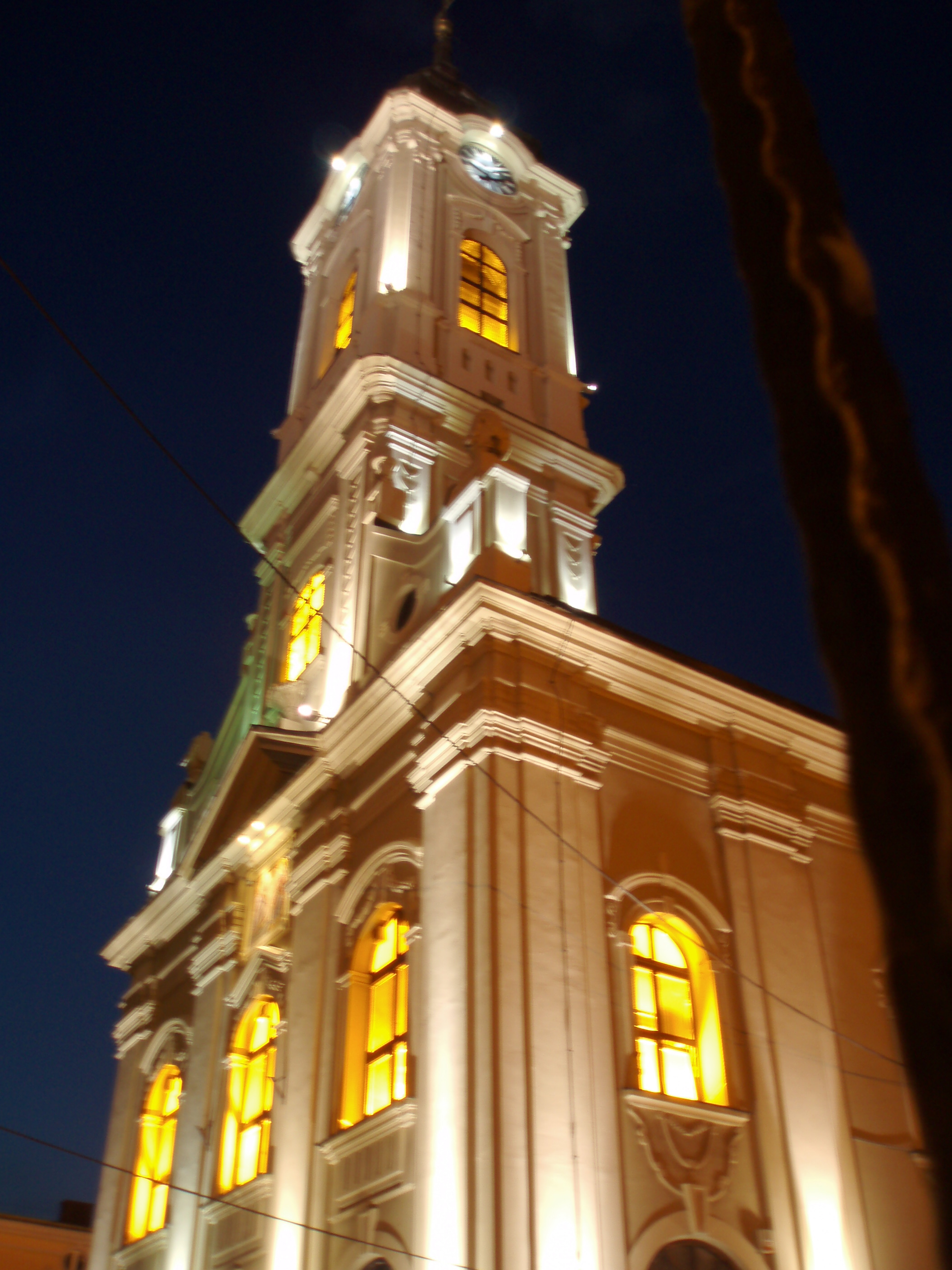
Belfry by night

== See more ==
- Church of the Holy Trinity (Zemun)
- St. Nicholas Church in Zemun
- The Hariš Chapel
