= Śrem (disambiguation) =

Śrem may refer to the following places in Poland:

- Śrem, a town in Greater Poland Voivodeship (central Poland)
- Śrem, Polkowice County in Lower Silesian Voivodeship (south-west Poland)
- Śrem, Ząbkowice County in Lower Silesian Voivodeship (south-west Poland)
- Śrem, Międzychód County in Greater Poland Voivodeship (west-central Poland)
