= Diocese of Syrmia =

Diocese of Syrmia (also Srem, or Srijem) may refer to:

- Serbian Orthodox Eparchy of Srem, one of dioceses of the Serbian Orthodox Church in Serbia
- Roman Catholic Diocese of Srijem, one of dioceses of Roman Catholic Church in Serbia

== See also ==
- Syrmia
- Bishopric of Syrmia (disambiguation)
- Eastern Orthodoxy in Serbia
- Catholic Church in Serbia
