= Grgurevci =

Grgurevci Гргуревци (Serbian)
- Village (Selo)
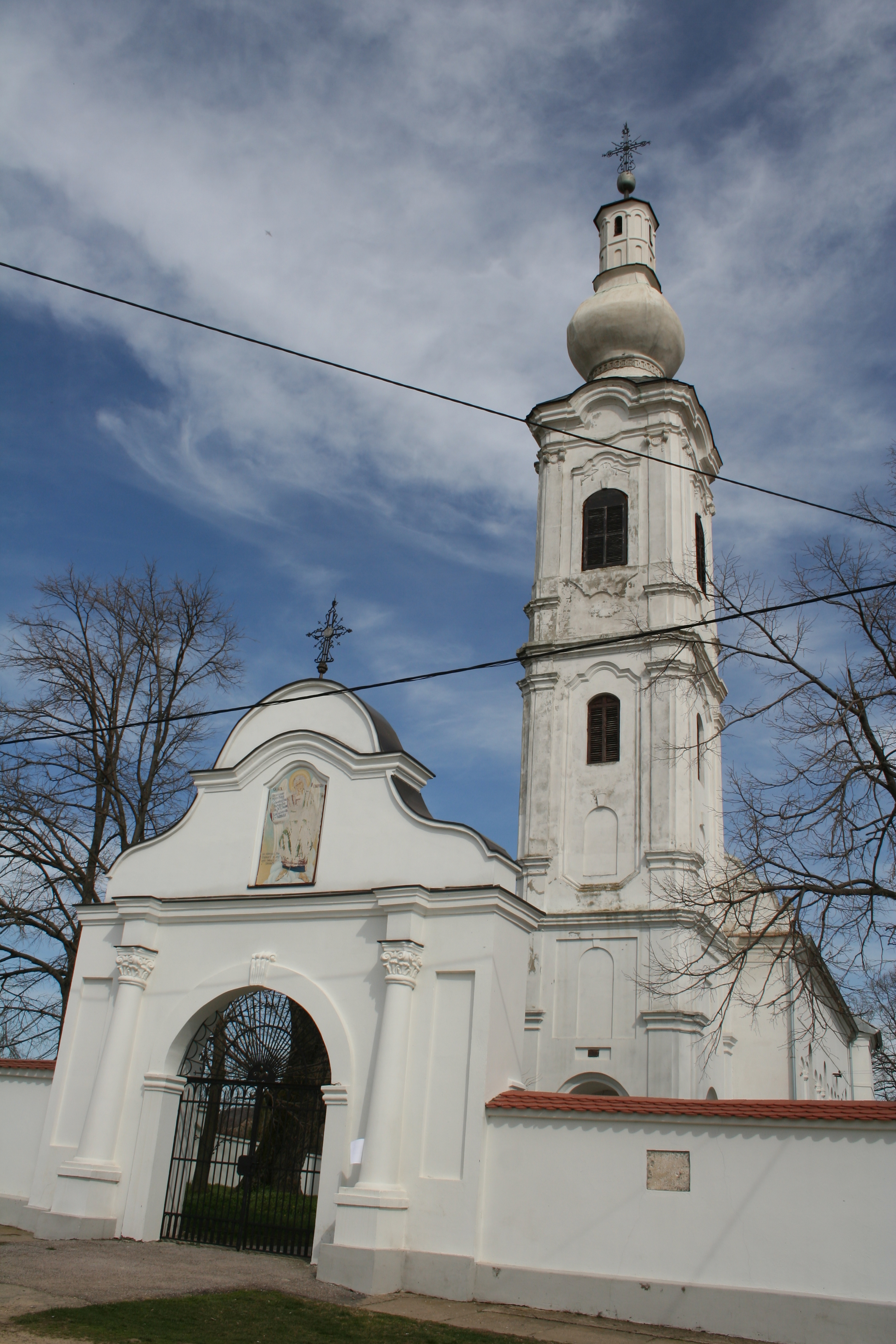

- Location within Vojvodina Location within Serbia Location within Europe
- Coordinates: 45°06′N 19°39′E
- Country: Serbia
- Province: Vojvodina
- Region: Syrmia
- District: Srem
- Municipality: Sremska Mitrovica

Population (2002)
  - Total: 1,312
- Time zone: UTC+1 (CET)
  - Summer (DST): UTC+2 (CEST)

Grgurevci (Serbian Cyrillic: Гргуревци) is a village in Serbia. It is situated in the Sremska Mitrovica municipality, Syrmia District, Vojvodina province. The village has a Serb ethnic majority and, according to the census, had a population of 1,312 people as of 2002.

== Name ==
In Serbian, the village is known as Grgurevci (Гргуревци), in Croatian as Grgurevci, and in Hungarian as Szentgergely. Its name derived from Serbian personal name Grgur. The name of the village in Serbian is plural.

== History ==
During World War II, the fascists executed the entire adult male population of this village. On June 6, 1942 the local Volksdeutche squads encircled the village forbidding any movements of the locals. At noon, all males of Serbian ethnicity were ordered to gather in front of the municipality house. Those who disobeyed were brought by force.

On this occasion local citizen Ranko Mišković-Dunja was severely beaten in retaliation for his two brothers being members of the resistance movement.

The group was taken on foot for a few hours to Orašje brick-clay quarry. A few boys were released for being children. Between 257 and 260 local male Serbs and a few Serb women were executed.

The testimonies mention local Germans who took part in the crime: Franja Nič, officer Reihner, Peter Weiner, Đura Herzeg (the mayor), and Adam Tajbli. Weiner is also remembered for putting a clod of calx in the mouth of Svetislav Crnić after finding him still breathing among the executed bodies. After that he shot him with three hits and hit the body with his foot.

== Historical population ==
- 1961: 1,371
- 1971: 1,452
- 1981: 1,405
- 1991: 1,319

== Family names of the villagers ==
Some of the prominent families in the village include: Ćorić, Ćurčić, Grabovački, Ivković, Jovešković, Kalabić, Lalović, Lođinović, Ostojić, Paunović, Pavlović, Perić, Petković, Popadić, Radosavljević, Ranitović, Ristić, Sanadrović, Simić, Stanković, Tejić, Udilović, Vidaković, Vasilić, Vesić, Vesković, Vozarević, Vuković, Zarin, etc.

== See also ==
- List of populated places in Serbia
- List of cities, towns and villages in Vojvodina
