= Sanjak of Syrmia =

Ottoman subdivision

Sanjak of Syrmia Sirem sancağı Sremski sandžak Srijemski sandžak
- Sanjak of the Ottoman Empire
- 1541–1718
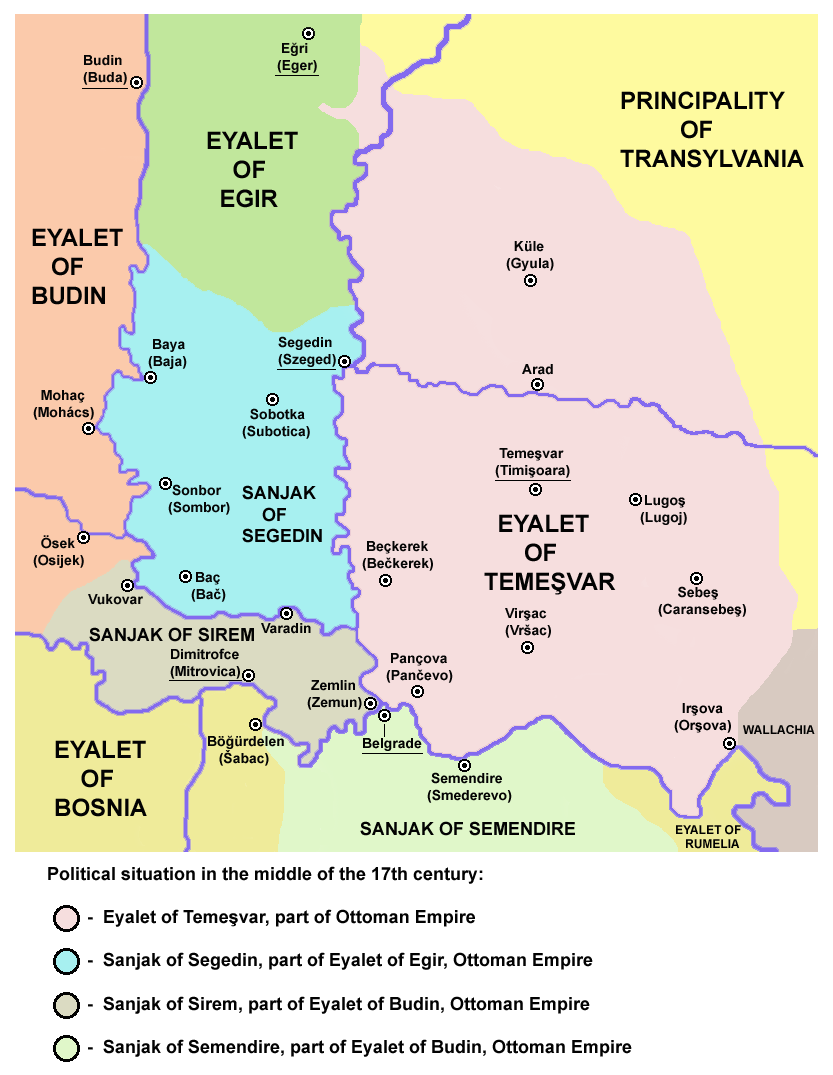
- Sanjak of Syrmia in the 17th century
- Capital: Uyluk (Turkish: Uyluk: today Ilok) Dimitrofça (Serbian:Dmitrovica, Sremska Mitrovica)
- History
  - Established: 1541
  - Disestablished: 1718
Preceded by
Syrmia County
Valkoensis County
Succeeded by
Sanjak of Smederevo
Military Frontier
Kingdom of Slavonia
- Today part of: Serbia; Croatia

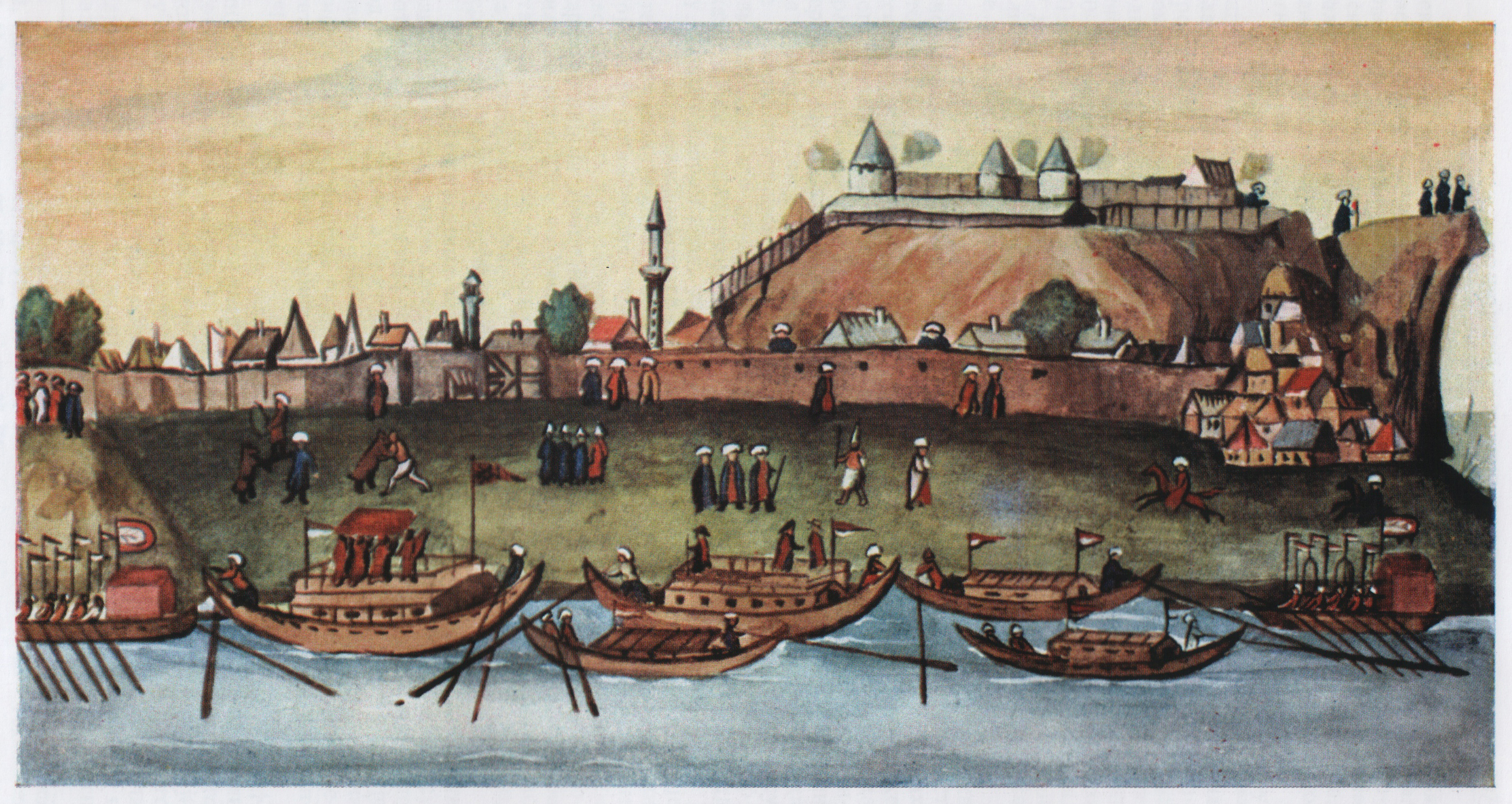
Ottoman Zemun in 1608

Sanjak of Syrmia (Turkish: Sirem sancağı, Serbian: Sremski sandžak/Сремски санџак, Croatian: Srijemski sandžak) was an administrative territorial entity of the Ottoman Empire formed in 1541. It was located in the Syrmia region and was part of the Budin Province. Administrative center of the Sanjak of Syrmia was from 1542 Uyluk (Croatian: Ilok) and in the second half of the 17th century it was Dimitrofça (Serbian: Dmitrovica, today Sremska Mitrovica). Most of the sanjak was ceded to Austria according to Treaty of Karlovitz in 1699. Remainder of the territory of sanjak was transferred to Sanjak of Semendire and was later also ceded to Austria according to Treaty of Passarowitz in 1718.

== Administrative divisions ==
In 1583-87, Sanjak was divided into several nahijas:

- Dimitrofça (Dmitrovica)
- Ilok
- Grgurevci
- Irig
- Podgajica (Podgorica)
- Varadin
- Syrmia
- Morović

In 1667, Sanjak was divided into several kadiluks:

- Dimitrofça (Dmitrovica)
- Ilok
- Budim
- Irig
- Nijemci
- Rača
- Vukovar
- Grgurevci
- Slankamen

== Population ==
Sanjak was mostly populated by Orthodox Serbs and Muslims of various ethnic origins. Population of villages was entirely Serb, while population of towns and cities was ethnically and religiously diverse. The largest city in sanjak was Dimitrofça (Dmitrovica), which, according to 1545-48 data was mainly populated by Serbs and according to 1566-69 data mainly by Muslims.

== See also ==
- Subdivisions of the Ottoman Empire
- Syrmia
- Ottoman monuments of Ilok
- Turkish Springs in Stari Ledinci
- Gallipoli Serbs
