= Bešenovo Monastery =

Monastery in Serbia

- М
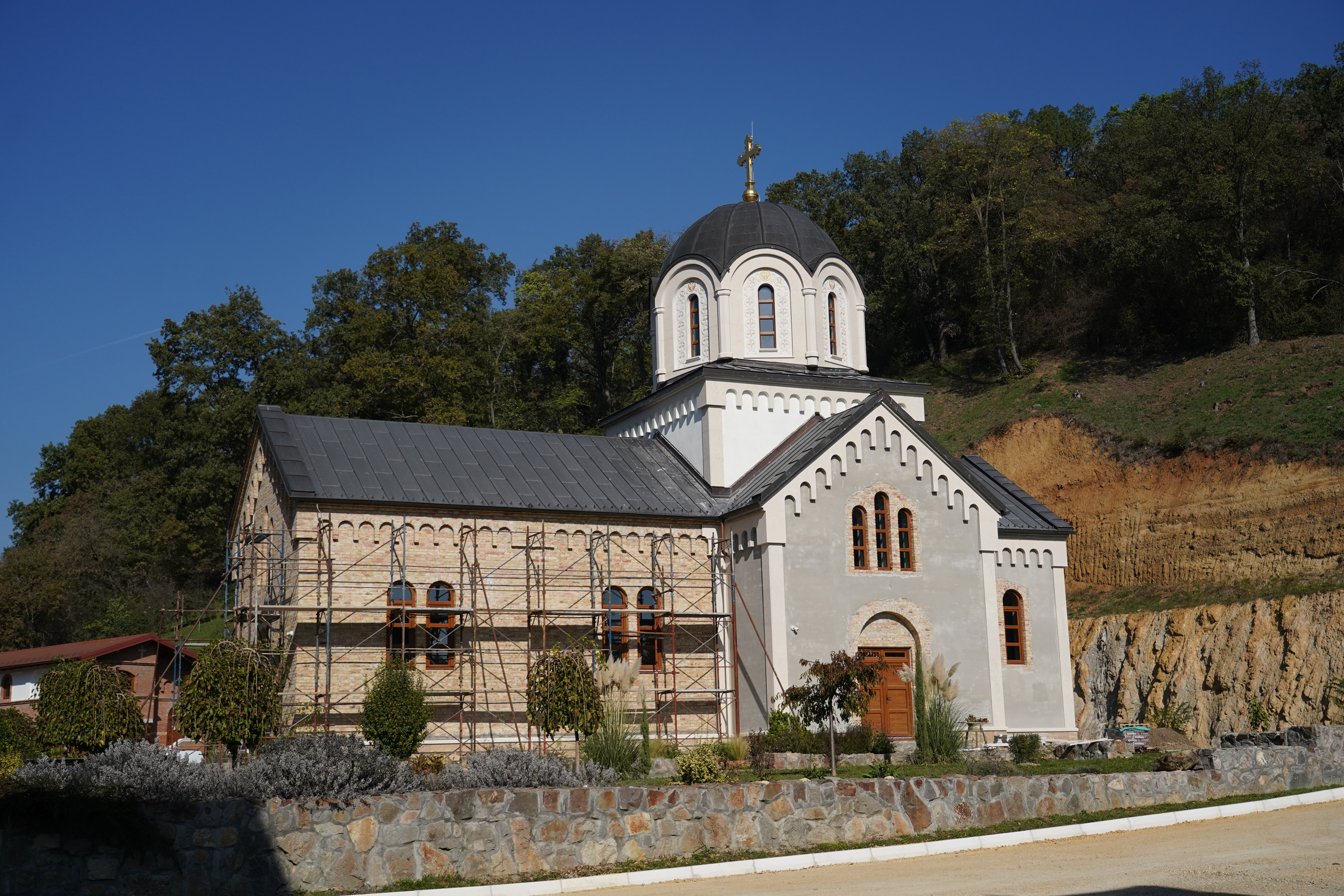
- The monastery church under reconstruction

- Location within Serbia
- Interactive map of Bešenovo Monastery

Monastery information
- Denomination: Serbian Orthodox Church
- Established: Late 13th century (according to tradition)
- Disestablished: 1944 (destroyed during World War II)
- Reestablished: Reconstruction started in 2013
- Dedication: Holy Archangels Michael and Gabriel
- Celebration: Synaxis of the Holy Archangels (November 21 / November 8 O.S.)
- Diocese: Eparchy of Srem

People
- Founder: King Stefan Dragutin (according to tradition)
- Abbot: Archimandrite Arsenije Matić

Architecture
- Status: Under reconstruction, active
- Functional status: Active
- Heritage designation: Monument of Culture of Exceptional Importance
- Designated date: 1990
- Style: Serbo-Byzantine (original style, reconstruction reflects it)

Site
- Location: Fruška Gora, Bešenovački Prnjavor
- Country: Serbia
- Coordinates: 45.117040°N 19.706994°E
- Public access: Yes (subject to reconstruction progress)
- Website: besenovo.org

The Bešenovo Monastery (Serbian: Манастир Бешеново) is a men's monastery of the Eparchy of Srem of the Serbian Orthodox Church. It is one of the 16 Fruška Gora monasteries in Vojvodina, Serbia. It is located on the southern slopes of the central part of Fruška Gora, near the village of Bešenovački Prnjavor, which was once a monastery's prnjavor. The monastery is currently undergoing reconstruction after being completely destroyed during World War II.

The monastery church is dedicated to the Holy Archangels Michael and Gabriel (Synaxis of the Holy Archangels). The archimandrite of the monastery is Arsenije Matić.

== Location ==
The Bešenovo Monastery is located near the village of Bešenovački Prnjavor. It is situated where the undulating and hilly terrain transitions into the mountainous part of Fruška Gora, at the beginning of a valley between hills.

== History ==
According to tradition, the monastery was founded by the Serbian King Stefan Dragutin at the end of the 13th century for his "sinful soul." The first reliable written records of the monastery's existence come from Ottoman censuses from 1545/1548, which state that it had a church dedicated to the Holy Archangels and paid taxes. The year 1467 was inscribed on the wall of the old monastery church as the year of its painting.

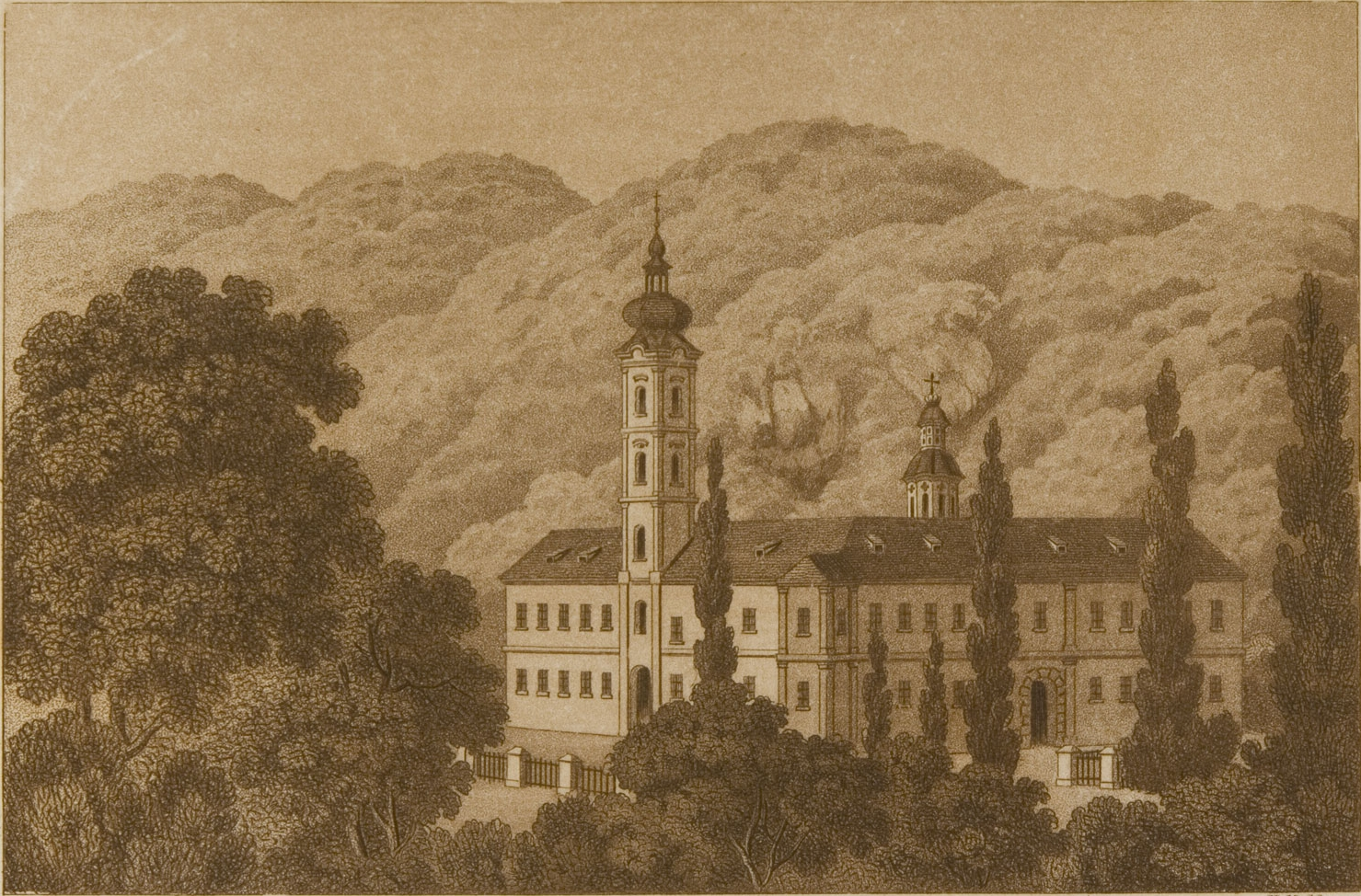
Engraving of Bešenovo Monastery, 1861.

Data from the end of the 18th century indicates that the monastery church had long been built of brick. In 1783, a bell tower with a chapel dedicated to Saints Cyricus and Julitta was mentioned for the first time. In the following decades, monastic konaks (residential quarters) were built, eventually having two floors and constructed on three sides (south, east, and north), with the entrance to the monastery on the open western side. The iconostasis of the old church was painted by Stevan Aleksić in 1909.

When the Vitovnica Monastery near Požarevac was destroyed by the Turks, its monks fled to Bešenovo Monastery with their most valuable liturgical items. Among these items was a Four Gospels book, bound in silver by Kondo Vuk in 1557, which is now kept in the Museum of the Serbian Orthodox Church in Belgrade.

The monastery housed the tomb of Colonel Aleksandar Rašković from 1773.

In 1817, the monks of Bešenovo appeared as subscribers to a book: Abbot Nestor Jovanović, and hieromonks Aleksandar Radonović, Avakum Živković (teacher), Sava Andrejević (deputy), and Josif Mihailović.

During World War II, the monastery suffered enormous devastation. It was looted and destroyed by the Ustaše, and finally bombed and completely demolished in 1944. Only some parts of the iconostasis were preserved, which are now kept in the Museum of Srem in Sremska Mitrovica and the Museum of Vojvodina in Novi Sad. As Bešenovo was so severely damaged, it was not rebuilt in the decades following the war.

For many years, only ruins remained at the monastery site. The initiative for reconstruction was launched at the beginning of the 21st century. In 2012, the site was cleared, and in 2013, a wooden bell tower was erected, and reconstruction work began. The digging of foundations for the new monastery church and construction work began in September 2013, based on a project that reflects the appearance of the old church. The original monastery bells, which had been preserved, were returned to the newly built bell tower. The cross on the new church was placed on 10 July 2015.

The reconstruction of the monastery is ongoing, with the help of donations and contributions from the faithful and supporters.

== Gallery ==
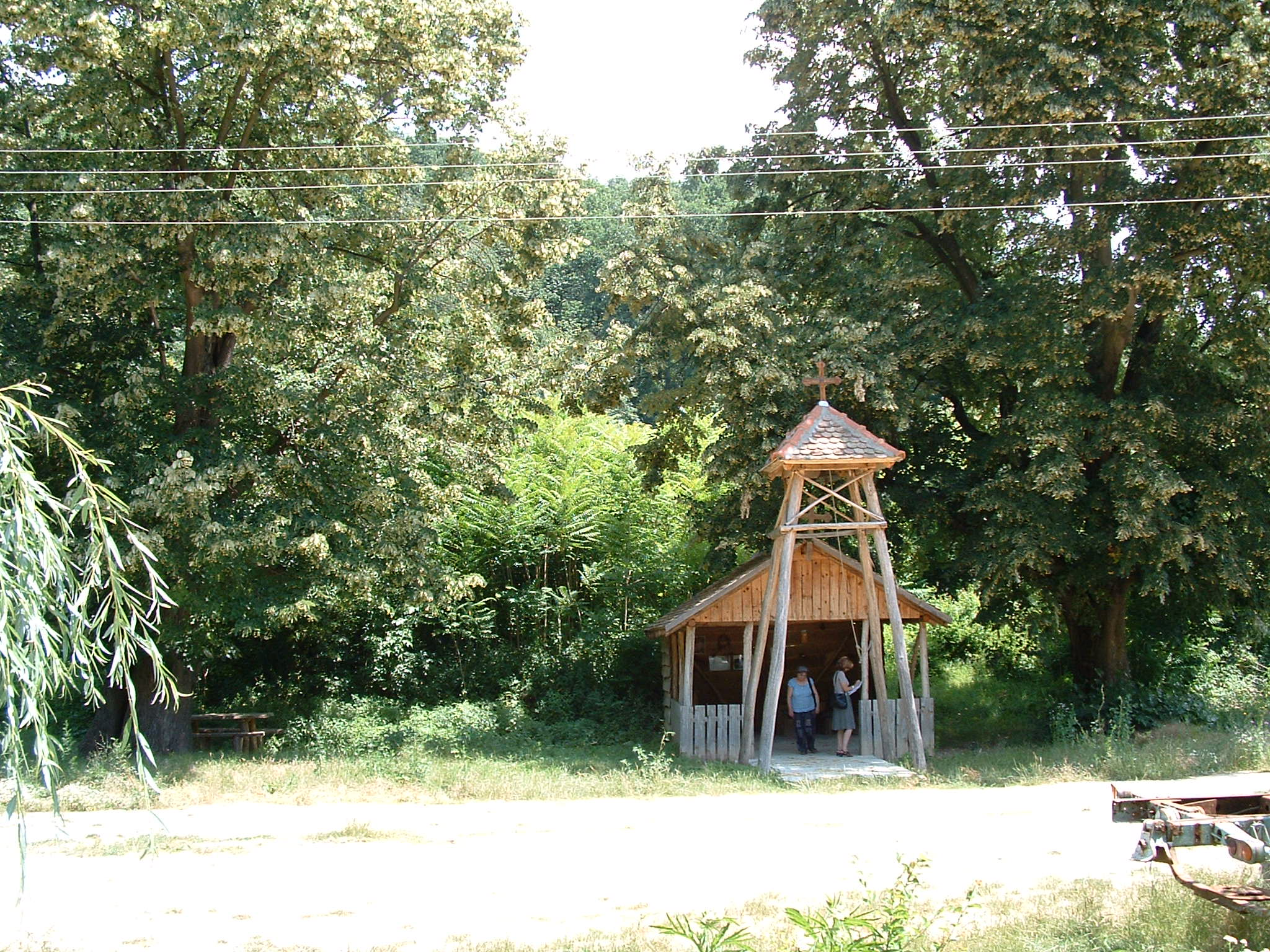
Chapel at the site of Bešenovo Monastery before reconstruction (2003)

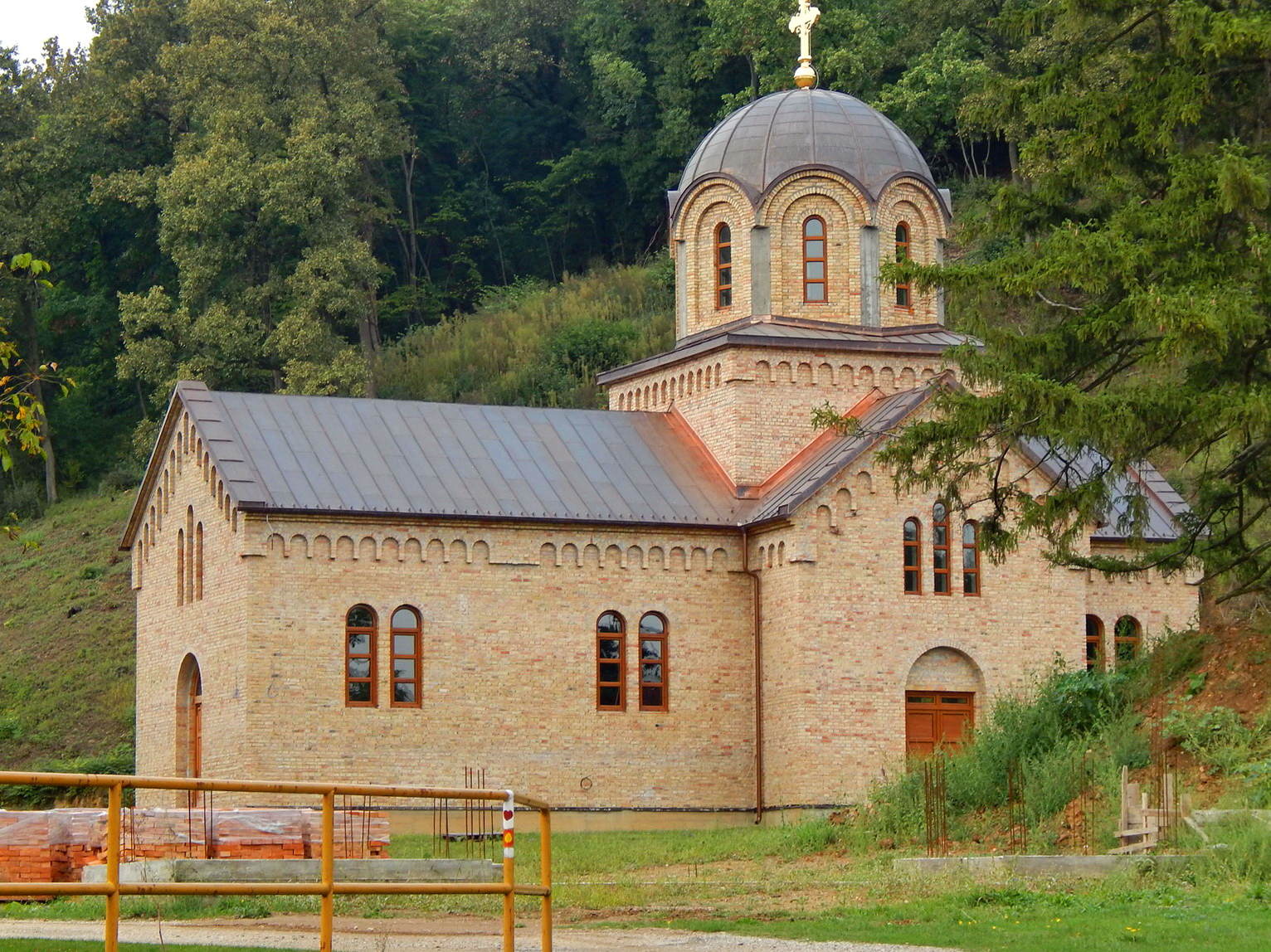
Bešenovo Monastery under reconstruction

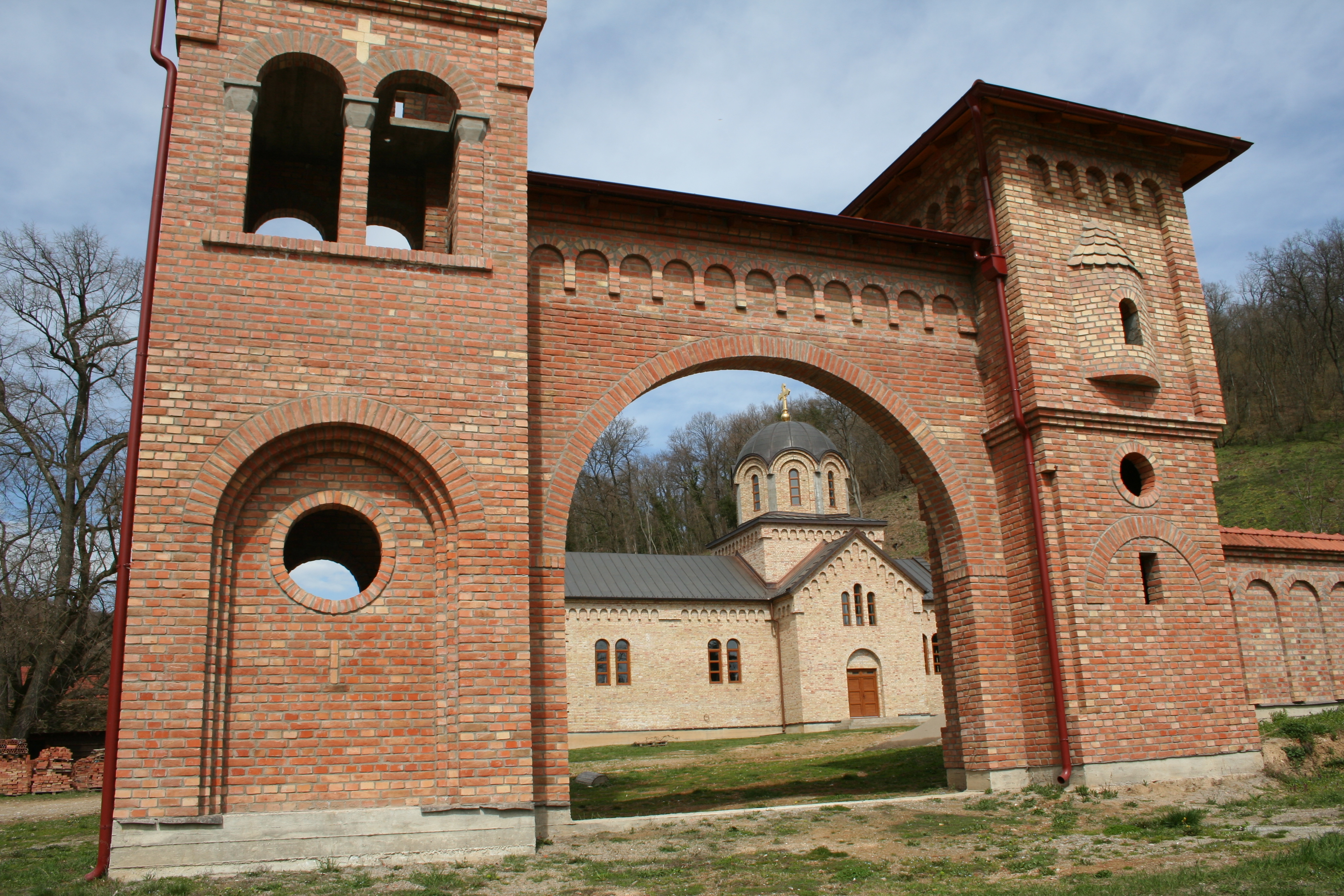
Monastery reconstruction

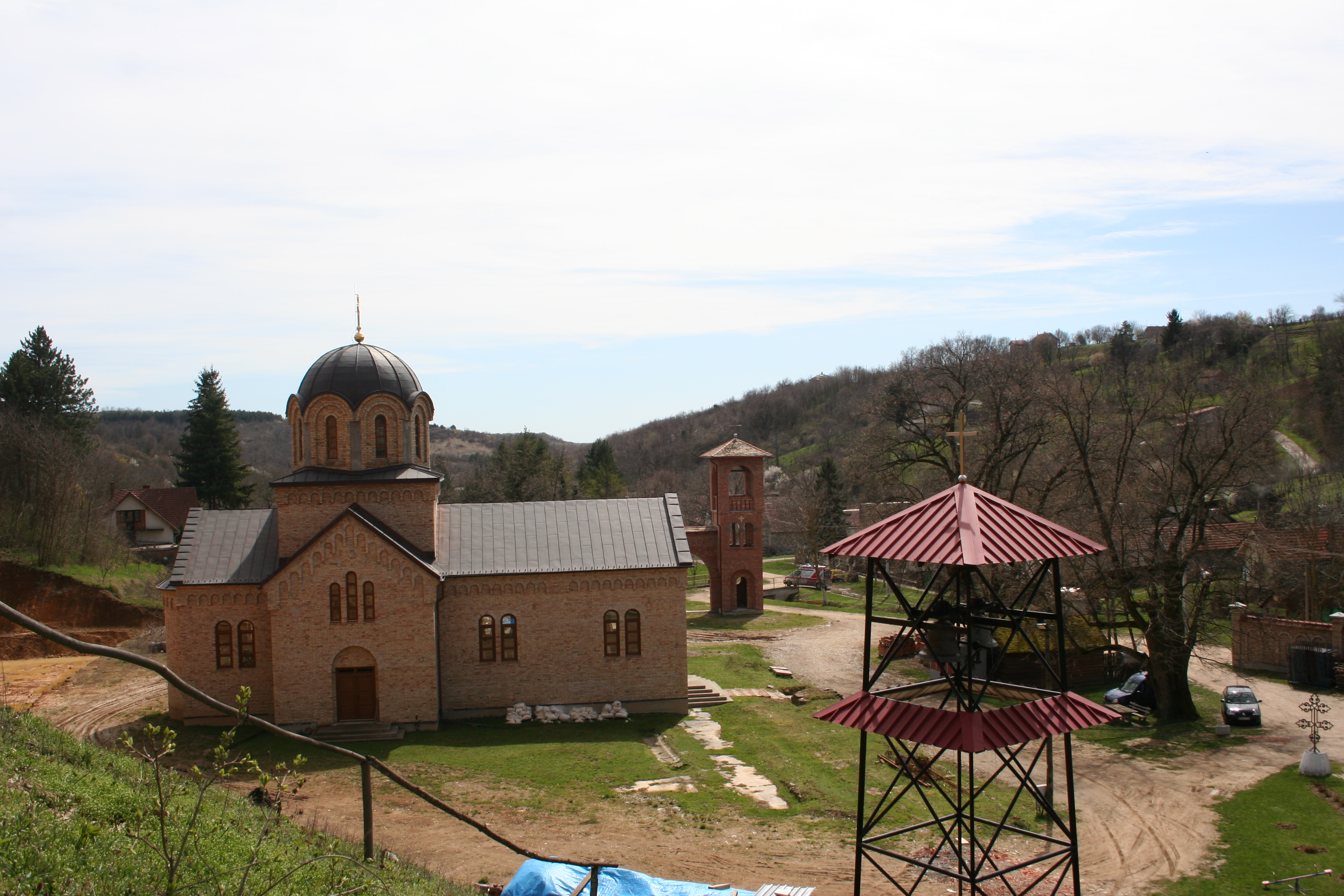
Work on the church

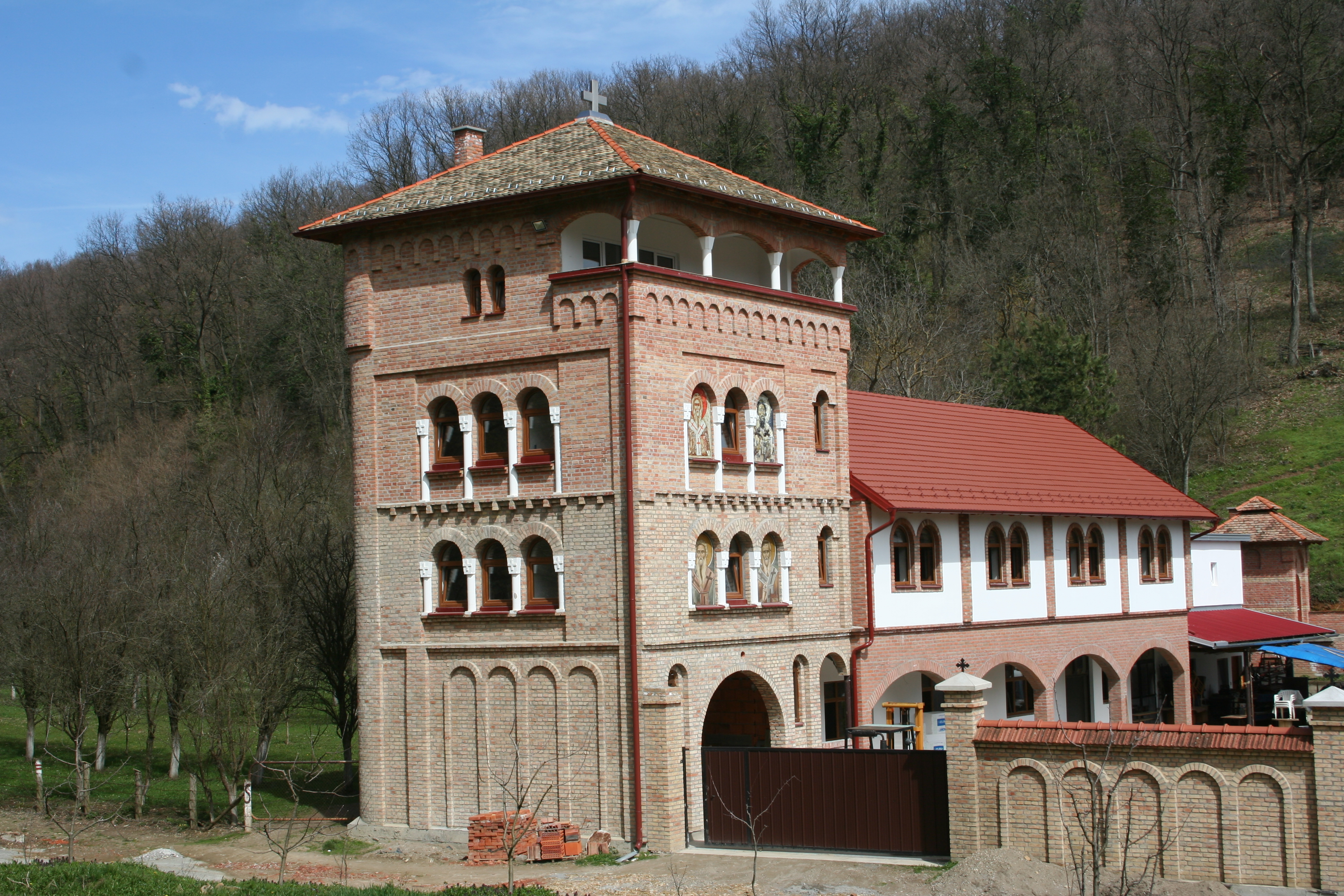
View of the complex under reconstruction

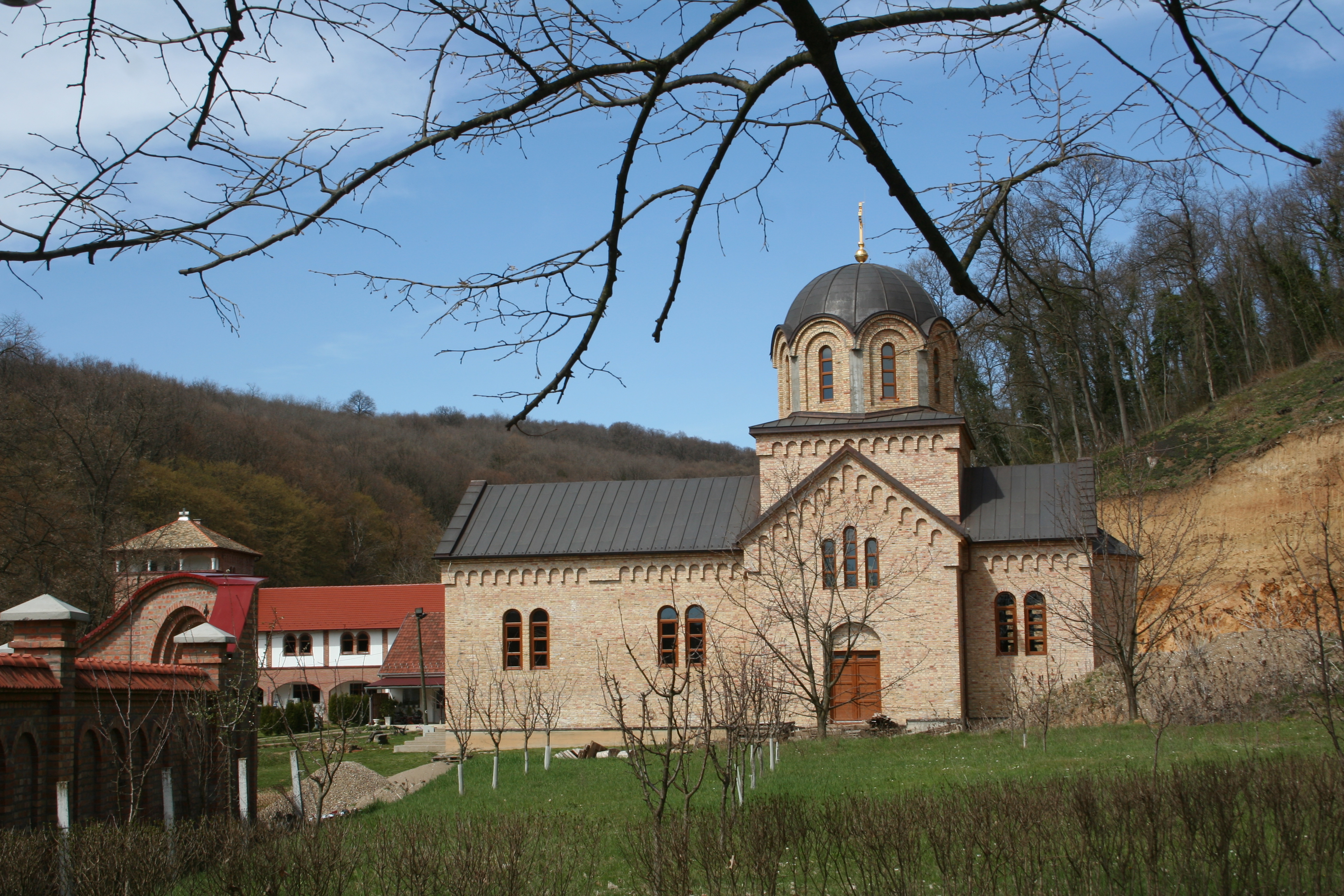
Reconstruction detail

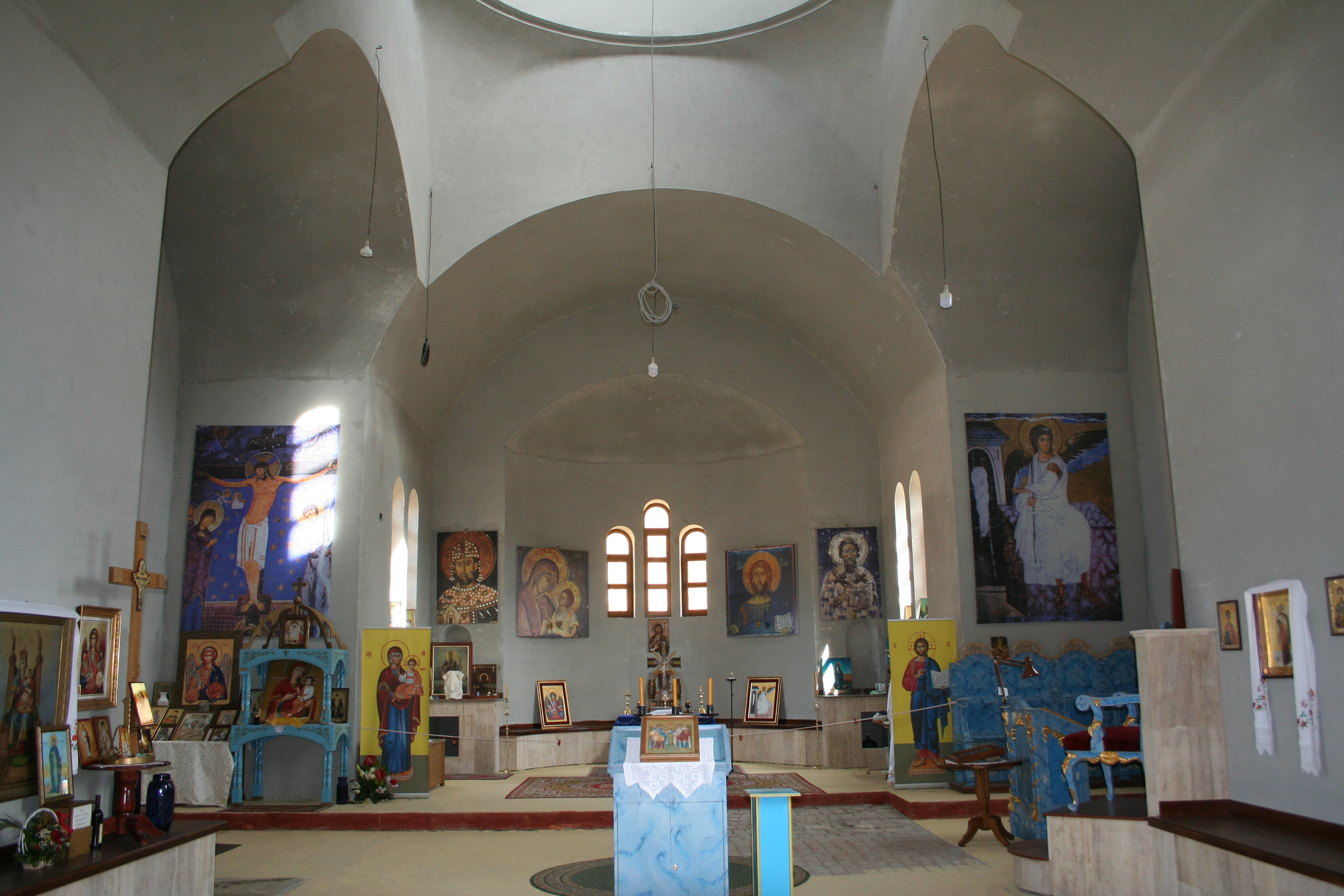
Bell tower

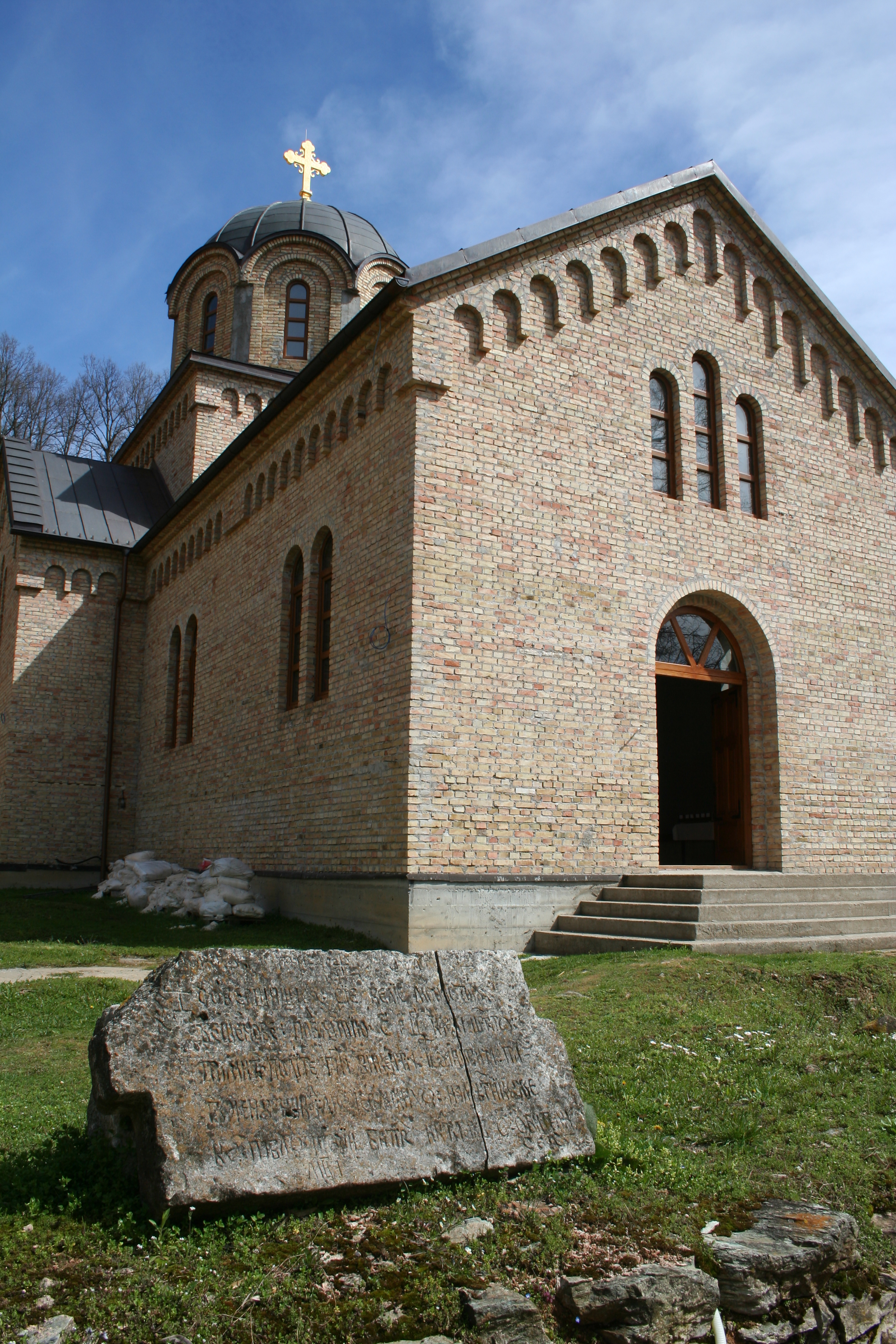
Interior of the church under construction

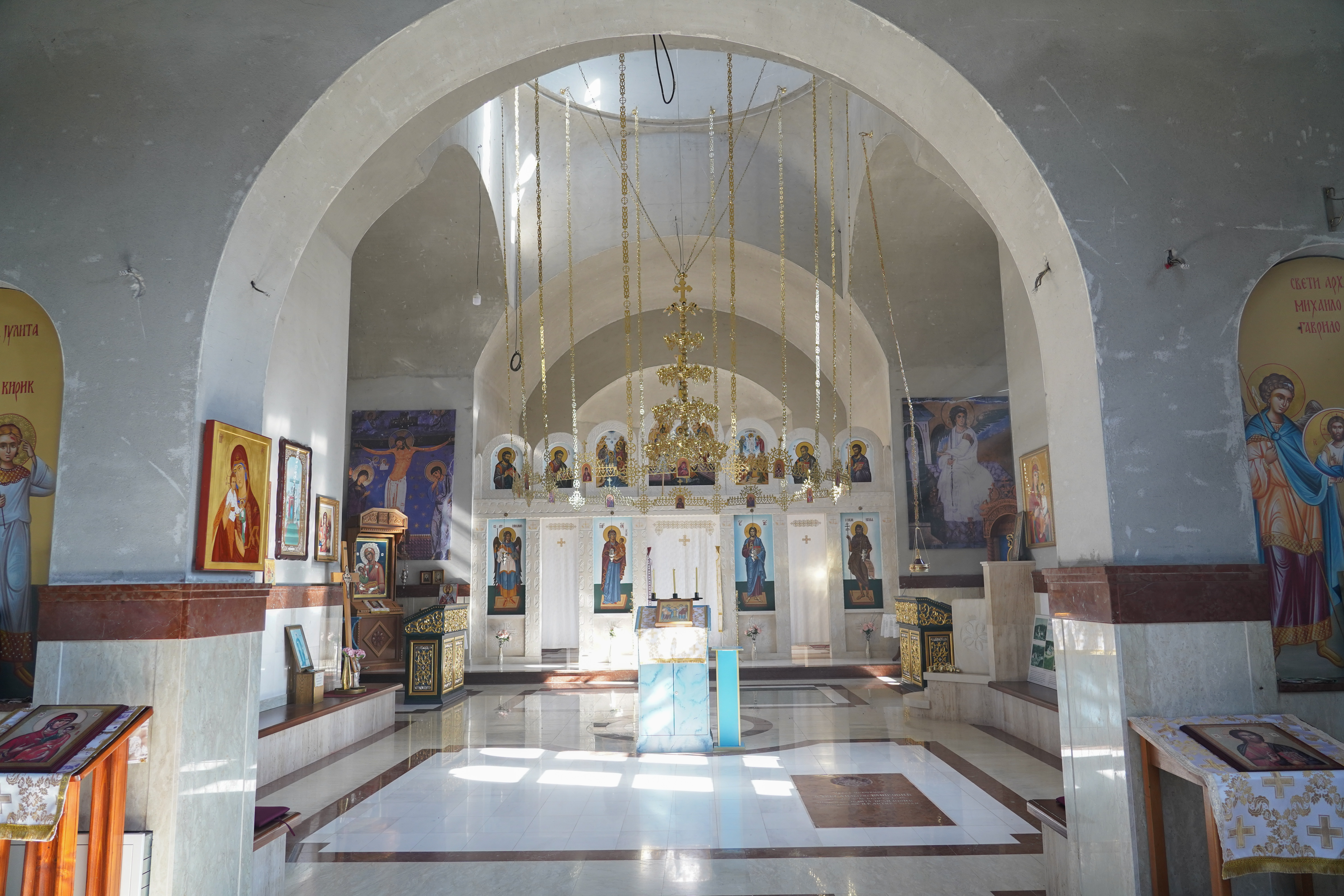
Nave of the church under reconstruction

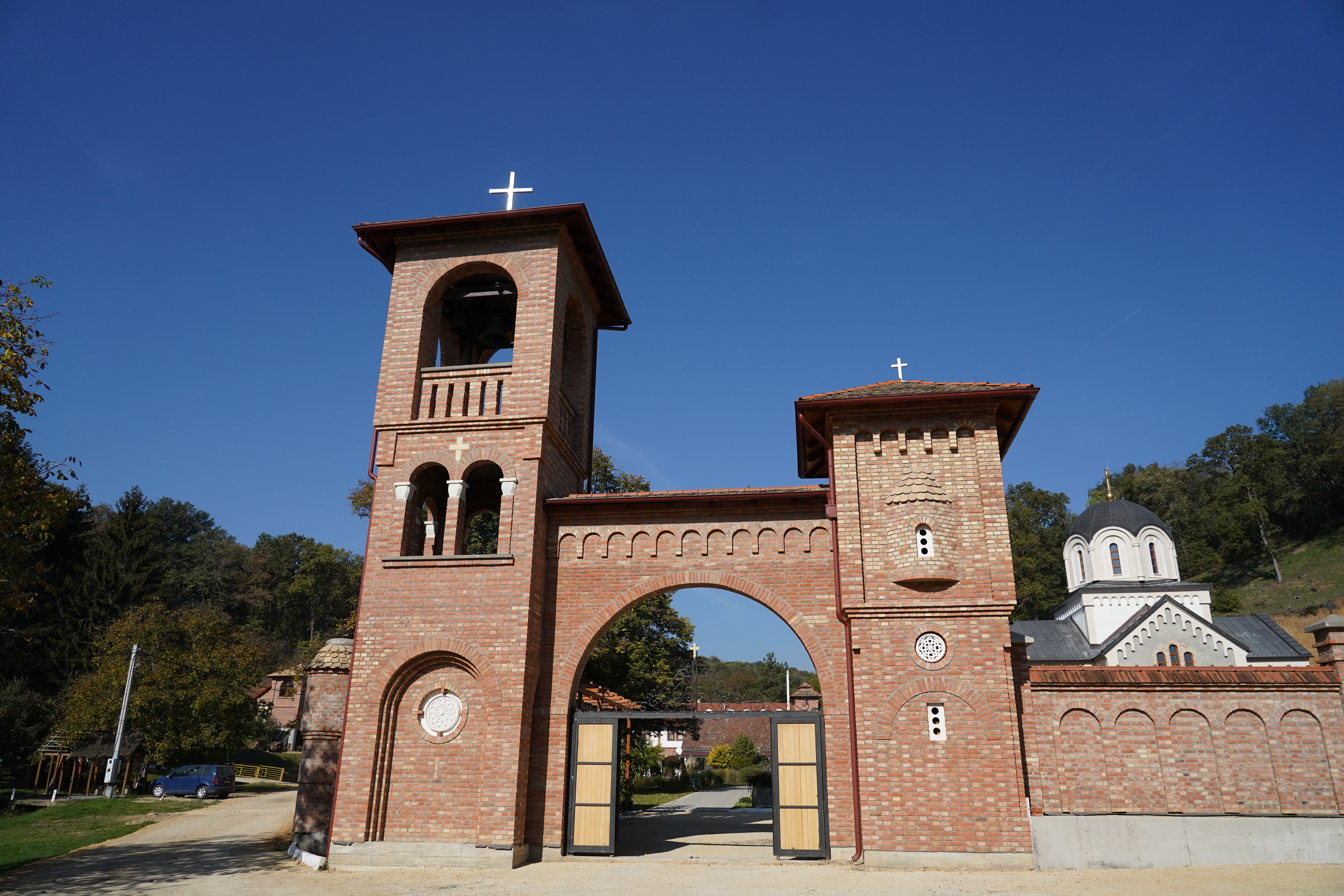
Entrance gate (newly built)

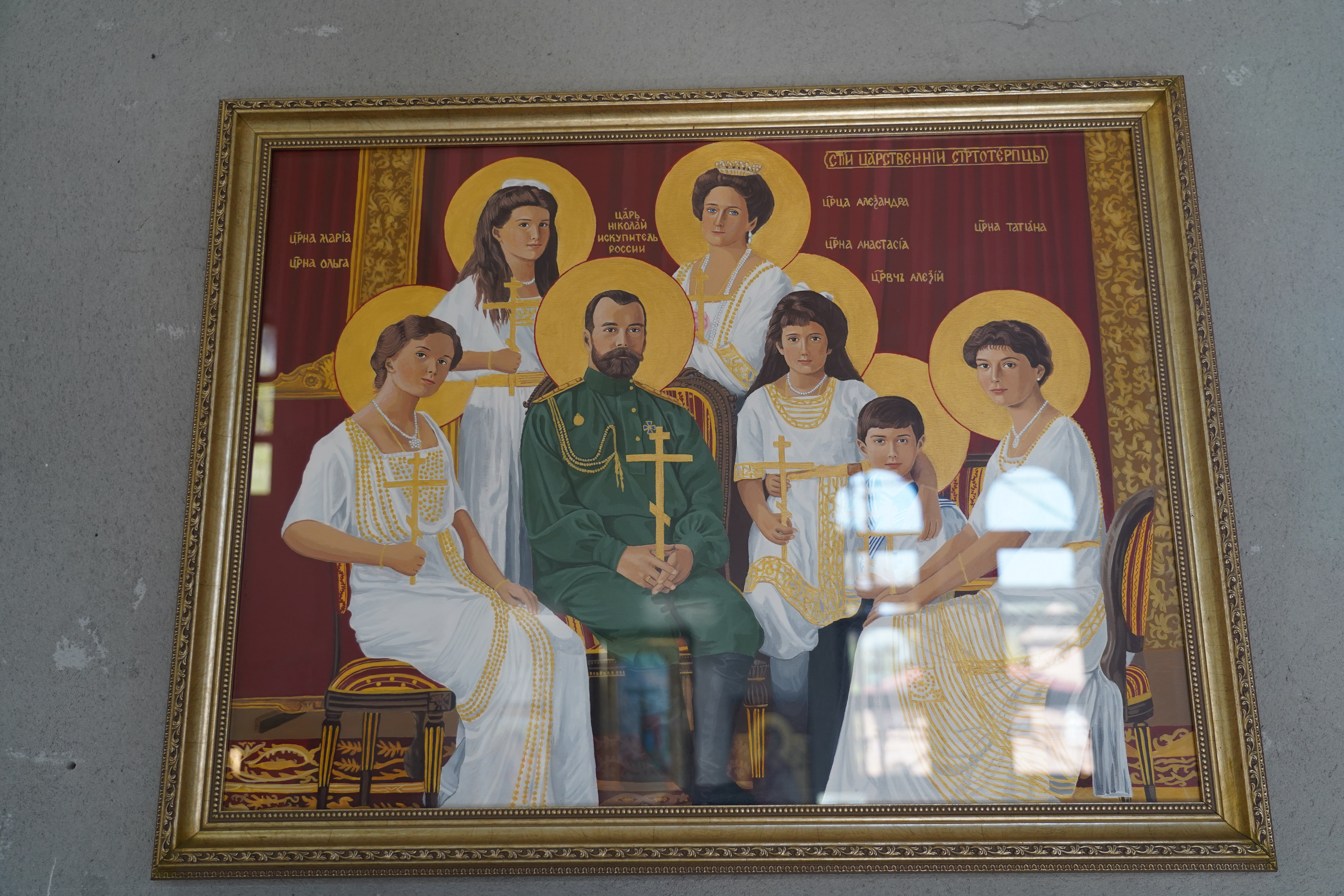
Icon of Holy Tsar Nicholas with family in the new church

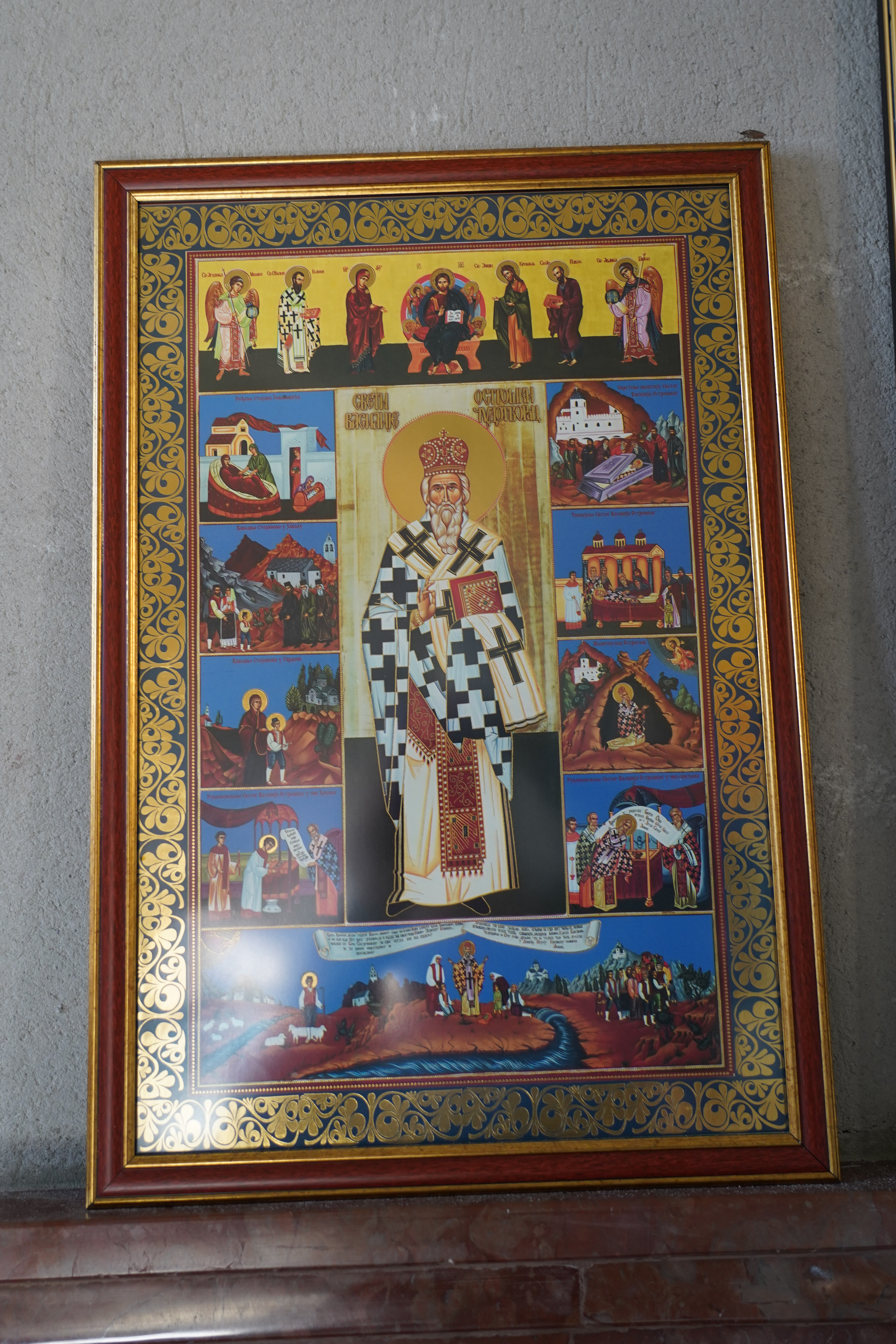
Icon of Saint Basil of Ostrog

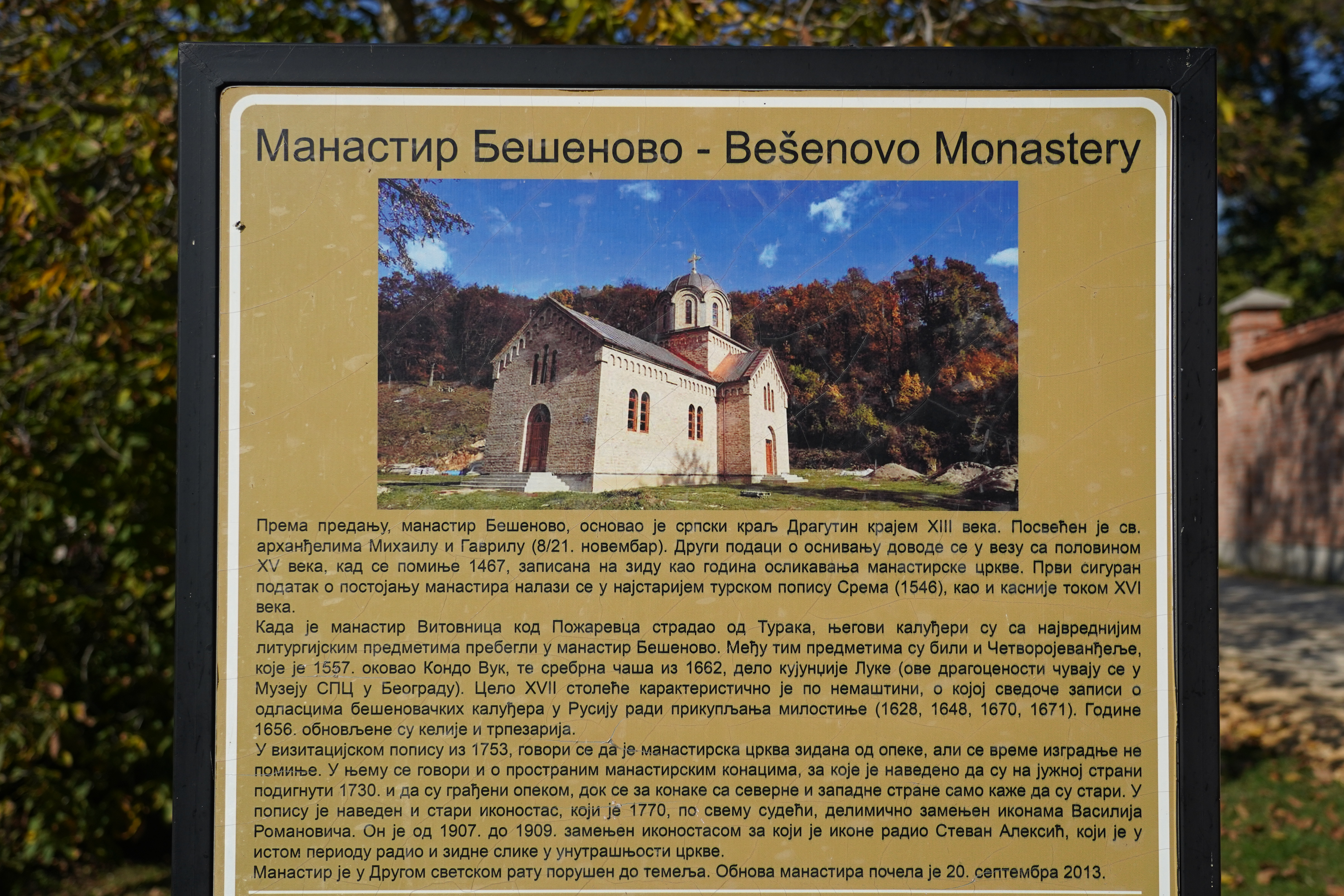
Information board about the monastery's history

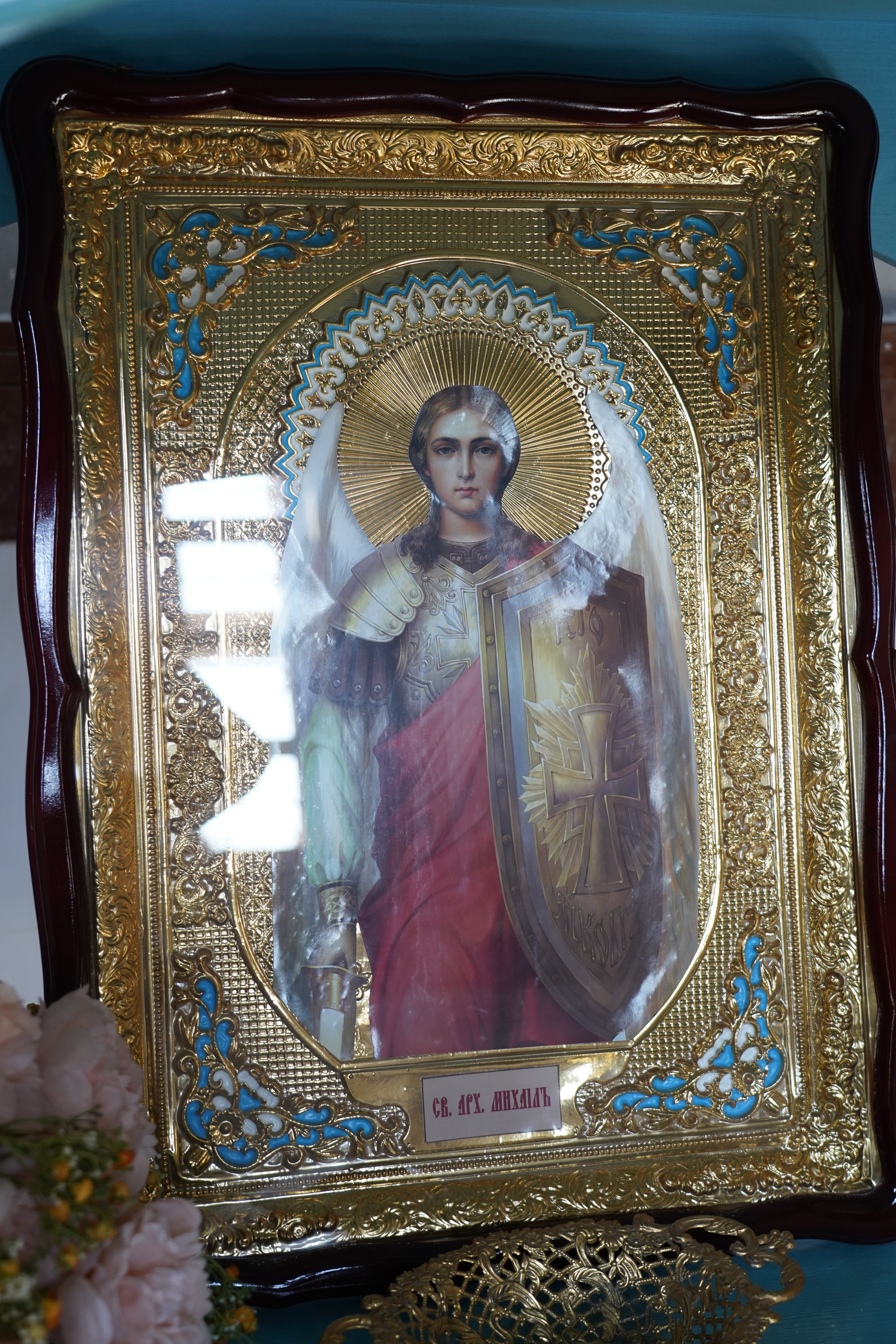
Icon of Saint Archangel Michael

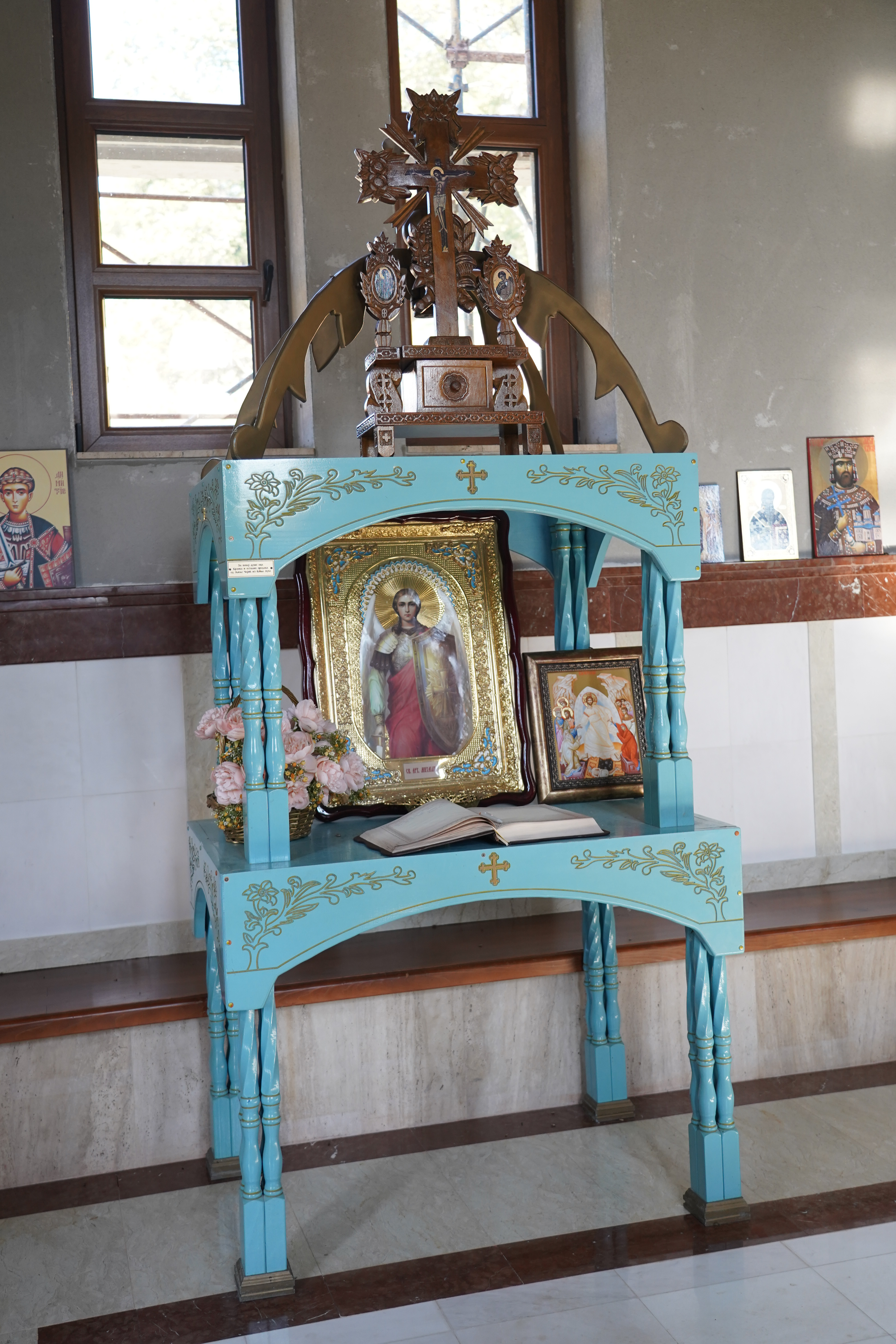
Reliquary area in the new church

== See also ==
- List of Serbian Orthodox monasteries

== Literature ==
- Đurković, Radovan (2011). Манастир Бешеново: културна, уметничка и духовна оставштина (Bešenovo Monastery: Cultural, Artistic and Spiritual Heritage) (in Serbian). Archived from the original on 2 December 2013.
