= Bešenovački Prnjavor =

Bešenovački Prnjavor Бешеновачки Прњавор (Serbian)
- Village (Selo)
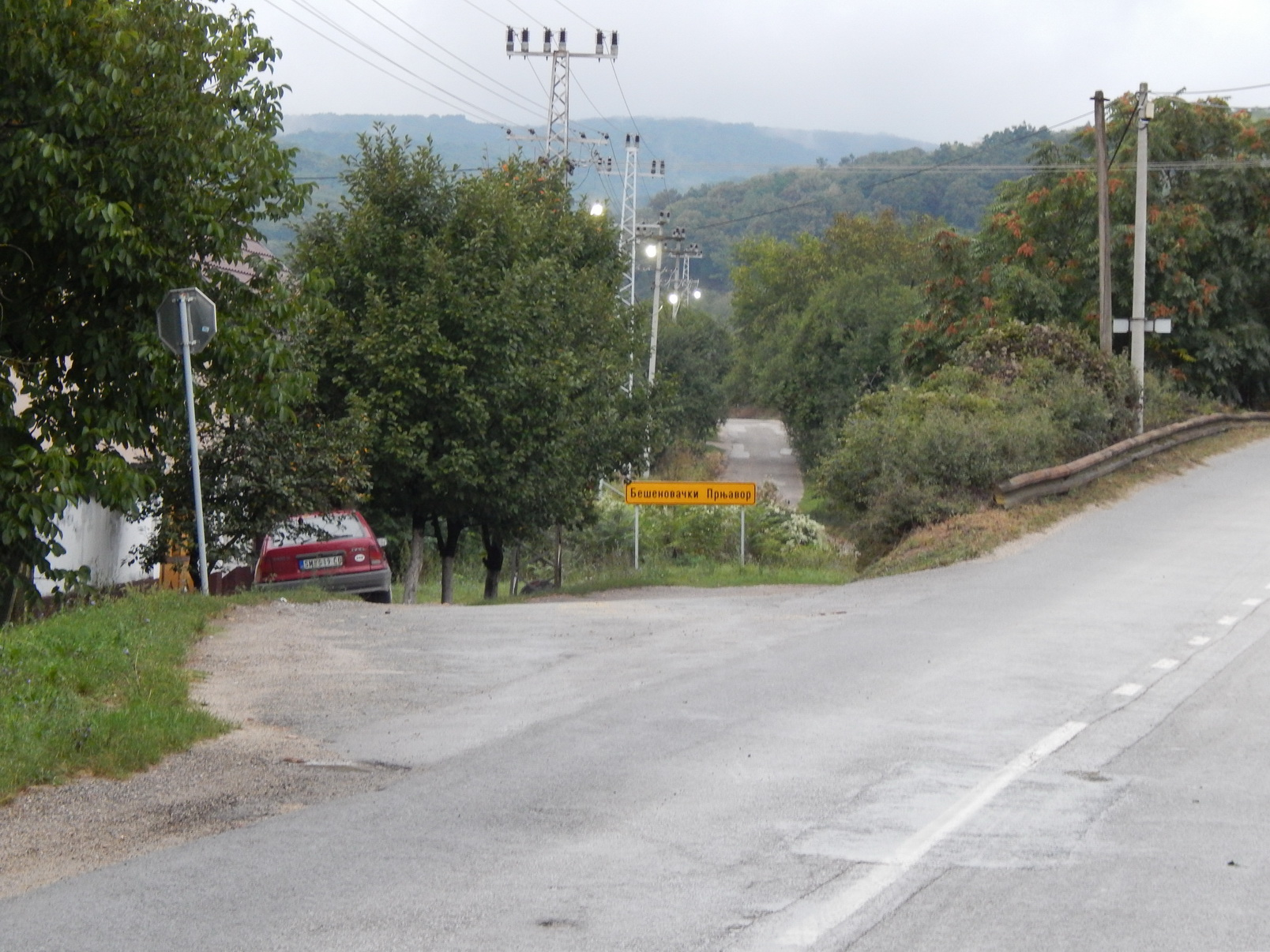

- Location within Vojvodina Location within Serbia Location within Europe
- Coordinates: 45°07′N 19°42′E
- Country: Serbia
- Province: Vojvodina
- Region: Syrmia
- District: Srem
- Municipality: Sremska Mitrovica

Population (2002)
  - Total: 145
- Time zone: UTC+1 (CET)
  - Summer (DST): UTC+2 (CEST)

Bešenovački Prnjavor (Serbian Cyrillic: Бешеновачки Прњавор) is a village in Serbia. It is situated in the Sremska Mitrovica municipality, in the Syrmia District, Vojvodina province. The village has a Serb ethnic majority and it is the smallest village in the municipality - its population numbering 145 people (2002 census). Near the village is Bešenovo monastery, one of 16 Serb Orthodox monasteries on Fruška Gora mountain.

== Name ==
In Serbian, the village is known as Bešenovački Prnjavor (Бешеновачки Прњавор), in Croatian as Bešenovački Prnjavor, and in Hungarian as Besenyőmonostor. Besenyő is the Hungarian word for the Pechenegs.

== Historical population ==
- 1981: 150
- 1991: 140
- 2002: 145

== See also ==
- Bešenovo monastery
- List of places in Serbia
- List of cities, towns and villages in Vojvodina
