= List of Serbian painters =

This is a list of notable Serbian painters, sorted alphabetically and with notable art styles.

== A ==
Portrait	Person			
	Nikola Aleksić (1808–1873); Nazarene, Bidermeier	Painting of Jovan Stefanović Vilovski, 1850	Lady in white, 1851	Jelena Vilovski, 1850
	Dimitrije Avramović (1815–1855); Neoclassicist, iconographer	Apoteoza Lukijana Mušickog, 1840	Saint Sava, 1852	Hegumen Hadžija, 1842
	Ljubomir Aleksandrović (1828–1887); Portraits, Iconography, Realism	Grape picker, 1878	St. Thomas the Apostle, mid 19th century	Young brunette, 19th century
	Stevan Aleksić (1876–1923); Munich school (Self-portrait, 1919)	The reaper, 1918	Angel of peace, 1916	Assumption of the Virgin Mary, 1906
	Stojan Aralica (1883–1980); Impressionist	Still nature, 1927	Littoral area, 1937	Enterieur, 1946
	Emanuil Antonovich (1785–1829); Icon painter			

== B ==
- Nikola Božidarević (1460–1517)
- Dimitrije Bačević (1735–1770)
- Dimitrije Bratoglic (1765–1831)
- Georgije Bakalović (1786–1843)
- Anastas Bocarić (1864–1944)
- Špiro Bocarić (1876–1941)
- Jovan Bijelić (c.1884–1964)
- Ilija Bašičević (1895–1972)
- Milica Bešević (1896–1941)
- Oto Bihalji-Merin (1904–1993)
- Janko Brašić (1906–1994)
- Miloš Bajić (1915–1995)
- Radivoj Berbakov (1925–2003)
- Kossa Bokchan (1925–2009)
- Bogdan Bulajić (born 1940)
- Ivana Bašić (born 1986)

== C ==
- Gala Čaki (born 1987), abstract
- Teodor Ilić Češljar (1746–1793)
- Petar Čortanović (1800–1868)
- Pavle Čortanović (1830–1903)
- Natalija Cvetković (1888–1928)
- Marko Čelebonović (1902–1986)
- Zuzana Chalupová (1925–2001)
- Mihailo Čanak (1932–2014)

== D ==
- Lovro Dobričević (1420–1478)
- Kozma Damjanović (c. 1650–after 1704)
- Grigorije Davidović-Obšić (18th century)
- Pavel Đurković (1772–1830)
- Konstantin Danil (1798–1873)
- Dragutin Inkiostri Medenjak (1866–1942)
- Petar Dobrović (1890–1942)
- Radomir Damnjanović Damnjan (born 1935)
- Dragana Đorđević (born 1960)
- Uroš Đurić (born 1964)
- Frano Menegello Dinčić (1900–1986)

== F ==
- Emerik Feješ (1904–1969)
- Ilija Fonlamov Francisković (born 1996)

== G ==
- Stefan Gavrilović (c. 1750–1823)
- Teodor Stefanov Gologlavac (18th century)
- Mališa Glišić (1886–1916)
- Miloš Golubović (1888–1961)
- Nedeljko Gvozdenović (1902–1988)
- Aleksa Gajić (born 1974)

== H ==
- Janko Halkozović (18th century)
- Kosta Hakman (1889–1961)

== I ==
- Jovan Isailović (c. 1756–1825)
- Jovan Isailović, Jr. (1803–1885)
- Katarina Ivanović (1811–1882)
- Ljubomir Ivanović (1882–1945)
- Olja Ivanjicki (1931–2009)

== J ==
- Amvrosije Janković (18th century)
- Đura Jakšić (1832–1878)
- Živko Jugović (1855–1908)
- Paja Jovanović (1859–1957)
- Đorđe Jovanović (1861–1953)
- Svetislav Jovanović (1861–1933), realism
- Danica Jovanović (1886–1914)
- Kosta Josipović (1887–1919)
- Mladen Josić (1897–1972)
- Ljubinka Jovanović (1922–2015)

== K ==
- Kyr Kozma (c. 1560–c. 1640)
- Sava Krabulević (c. 1650–after 1706)
- Teodor Kračun (1730–1781)
- Uroš Knežević (1811–1876)
- Mina Karadžić (1828–1894)
- Đorđe Krstić (1851–1907)
- Leon Koen (1859–1934)
- Kiril Kutlik (1869–1900)
- Stepan Kolesnikoff (1879–1955)
- Milan Konjović (1898–1993)
- Ferenc Kalmar (1928–2013)
- Momo Kapor (1937–2010)
- Stevan Knežević (1940–1995)
- Dragoš Kalajić (1943–2005)
- Vladimir Krstić (born 1959)
- Ivan Kovalčik Mileševac (born 1968)

== L ==
- Zograf Longin (16th century)
- Stefan Likić (c. 1680–c. 1750)
- Simeon Lazović (c. 1745–1817)
- Aleksije Lazović (1774–1837))
- Andjelija Lazarević (1885–1926)
- Lazar Licenoski (1901–1964)
- Vladislav Lalicki (1935–2008)
- Lazar Licenoski (1901–1964)
- Stefan Lukić (1985)

== M ==
- Georgije Mitrofanović (c.1550–c.1630)
- Ostoja Mrkojević (1630–1699)
- Joakim Marković (1685–1757)
- Petar Nikolajević Moler (1775–1816)
- Jovan Stergević-Janja Moler (1780–1841)
- Janko Mihailović Moler (1792–1853)
- Aksentije Marodić (1838–1909)
- Marko Murat (1864–1944)
- Dragutin Inkiostri Medenjak (1866–1942)
- Rafailo Momčilović (1875–1941)
- Milan Milovanović (1876–1946)
- Kosta Miličević (1877–1920)
- Mihailo Milovanović (1879–1941)
- Ana Marinković (1881–1972)
- Todor Manojlović (1883–1968)
- Milan Minić (1889–1961)
- Ljubomir Micić (1895–1971)
- Predrag Milosavljević (1908–1989)
- Svetislav Mandić (1921–2005)
- Milorad Bata Mihailović (1923–2011)
- Radoslav Lale Milenković (1926–2014)
- Milić od Mačve (1934–2000)
- Dobrosav Milojevic (born 1948)
- Milovan Destil Marković (born 1957)
- Petar Meseldžija (born 1965)
- Mihael Milunović (born 1967)
- Emanuel Maša Muanović (1880–1944)

== N ==
- Nikola Nešković (1740–1789)
- Hadži Ruvim Nedeljković (1752–1804)
- Petar Nikolajević Moler (1775–1816)
- Živorad Nastasijević (1893–1966)

== O ==
- Zaharije Orfelin (1726–1785)
- Vasa Ostojić (1730–1791)
- Grigorije Davidović-Obšić (c. 1745–after 1800)
- Jakov Orfelin (c. 1750–1803)
- Petar Omčikus (1926–2019)
- Dušan Otašević (born 1940)

== P ==
- Jovan Pačić (1771–1849)
- Jeftimije Popović (1792–1876)
- Jovan Popović (1810–1864)
- Pavel Petrović (1818–1887)
- Živko Pavlović (19th century)
- Uroš Predić (1857–1953)
- Petar Popović (1873–1945)
- Nadežda Petrović (1873–1915)
- Dragoljub Pavlović (1875–1956)
- Branko Popović (1882–1944)
- Pero Popović (1882–1931)
- Petar Palaviccini (1887–1958)
- Miodrag Petrović (1888–1950)
- Sava Petrovic (painter) (1788–1857)
- Pavel Petrović (1818–1887)
- Vasa Pomorišac (1893–1961)
- Zora Petrović (1894–1962)
- Branko Ve Poljanski (1898–1947)
- Mihajlo Petrov (1902–1983)
- Milena Pavlović-Barili (1909–1945)
- Miodrag B. Protić (1922–2014)
- Mića Popović (1923–1996)
- Ljubomir Popović (1934–2016)
- Đorđe Prudnikov (1939–2017)
- Neša Paripović (born 1942)
- Slobodan Pejić (1944–2006)
- Relja Penezic (born 1950)
- Slobodan Peladic (born 1962)

== R ==
- Radoslav (15th century)
- Andrija Raičević (c. 1610–1673)
- Zograf Radul (c. 1630–c. 1690)
- Vasilije Romanovich (c. 1700–1773)
- Novak Radonić (1826–1890)
- Simeon Roksandić (1874–1943)
- Toma Rosandić (1878–1958)
- Branko Radulović (1881–1916)
- Ivan Radović (1894–1973)
- Božidar Rašica (1912–1992)
- Radomir Reljić (1938–2006)
- Savo Radulović (1911–1991)

== S ==
- Monk Simeon (fl. 1196–1202)
- Lazar Serdanović (1744–1799)
- Jovan Stergević (1780–1841)
- Pavle Simić (1818–1876)
- Adam Stefanović (1832–1887)
- Iva Despić-Simonović (1891–1961)
- Veljko Stanojević (1892–1967)
- Vasilije Stojanović Vasa (born 1955)
- Sava Šumanović (1896–1942)
- Živko Stojsavljević (1900–1978)
- Ljubica Sokić (1914–2009)
- Sava Stojkov (1925–2014)
- Mladen Srbinović (1925–2009)
- Radomir Stević Ras (1931–1982)
- Slobodan Škerović (born 1954)
- Gradimir Smudja (born 1956)
- Jovanka Stanojević (born 1979)

== T ==
- Georgije Tenecki (18th century), rococo, baroque, portrait
- Stefan Tenecki (1720–1798), icons
- Arsenije Teodorović (1767–1826), portraits
- Stevan Todorović (1832–1925), portraits, war
- Vladislav Titelbah (1847–1925), folk art
- Ivan Tabaković (1898–1977)
- Dragan Malešević Tapi (1949–2002), hyperrealism
- Rade Tovladijac (born 1961), fantasy, comics

== U ==
- Petar Ubavkić (1852–1910)

== V ==
- Jov Vasilijevich (1700–1760)
- Igor Vasiljev (1928–1954)
- Paško Vučetić (1871–1925)
- Beta Vukanović (1872–1972)
- Rista Vukanović (1873–1918)
- Ljubiša Valić (1873–1950)
- Vukosava Velimirović (1888–1965)
- Miloš Vušković (1900–1975)
- Draginja Vlasić (1928–2011)
- Vladimir Veličković (1935–2019)
- Vuk Vidor (born 1965)
- Nemanja Vučković (born 1990)

== Z ==
- Zograf Longin (16th century)
- Hristofor Žefarović (c. 1690–1753)
- Jovan Zonjić (1907–1961)
- Metropolitan Jovan Zograf (14th)

== See also ==
- Serbian art
- List of Serbs
- List of Serbian architects
