= Valič =

Valič is a surname. Notable people with the surname include:

- Ljubiša Valić (1873–1950), Serbian war artist
- Miha Valič (1978–2008), Slovenian mountaineer
