= Vukosava =

Vukosava is a feminine given name. Notable people with the name include:

- Vukosava Đapić, Serbian sprinter
- Vukosava Velimirović, Serbian and Yugoslav artist
