= Savo Radulović =

Serbian-American painter (1911–1991)

Savo Radulović (27 January 1911 – 17 November 1991) was a Serbian American painter.

== Biography ==
Born in Gornje Polje, near Nikšić in the Kingdom of Montenegro, Savo Radulović was the son of Ivan and Petruša Radulović from the region of Brda.

In 1921, Radulović's father Ivan was already in the United States. At that time, Ivan had a photography studio in Zeigler, Illinois, and he decided after being established for a few years to bring his family over to America. That year Radulović arrived in America with the rest of the family.

For several years, Radulović worked in Zeigler at his father's photo studio, where he learned the skills of a photographer. However, art was his true calling. When he was still a boy in elementary school, his natural gift for drawing and painting became noticeable. Because Zeigler, a small coal mining town in southern Illinois offered little or no opportunities for further art studies, Radulović left for St. Louis, Missouri in 1929., with his younger sister Krstinja. In St. Louis, Radulović and Krstinja took over a photo studio which, until then, had been a branch of Zeigler operation. Then Radulović began to attend art school at Washington University in St. Louis as a part-time student. He studied under several prominent professors, namely Tanasko Milovich, a renowned St. Louis artist and fellow Serb. In 1931, Radulović enrolled as a full-time student in the St. Louis School of Fine Arts (now the Sam Fox School of Design & Visual Arts) at Washington University.

By 1937, Radulović was well on his way to success. He won a Carnegie Fellowship to Fogg Museum, Harvard University. He held his first exhibition in New York in 1940. Radulović received the Purchase Prize from the St. Louis Art Museum.

When the United States entered World War II in December 1941, Radulović enlisted in the U.S. Army, serving with distinction for four years as United States War Department artist and intelligence monitor for the Allied Armies of North Africa, Italy and Yugoslavia.

He was the owner and director of the Artists Little Gallery from 1946 into the 1970s.

From 1949 to 1950, he earned the benefits of a Fulbright Scholarship at the Accademia di Belle Arti di Roma. His works were selected for group exhibits at the Whitney Museum of American Art, the National Academy of Design, and the Wildenstein Gallery—all in New York; the Galleria Nazionale d'Arte Moderna in Rome; the Pennsylvania Academy of the Fine Arts; and the Saint Louis Art Museum.

Among the institutions which include his works in permanent collections are the City Art Museum, St. Louis; the University of Arizona, Tucson; the Evansville Museum (Indiana); and the Pentagon, Washington, D.C. Radulović's paintings are also in other private and museum collections both in America and abroad.

Radulović died on 17 November 1991 in Dubrovnik. He was buried in the Serbian Orthodox Cemetery in Dubrovnik, the details which were handled by his son, amidst the Siege of Dubrovnik.

== Sources ==
- Serb World U.S.A., Vol. XXX, No. 6, July/August, 2014, pp. 8–13

== See also ==
- List of Serbian painters
