= Ilija Bašičević =

Serbian artist

Ilija Bašičević Bosilj Илија Башичевић Босиљ
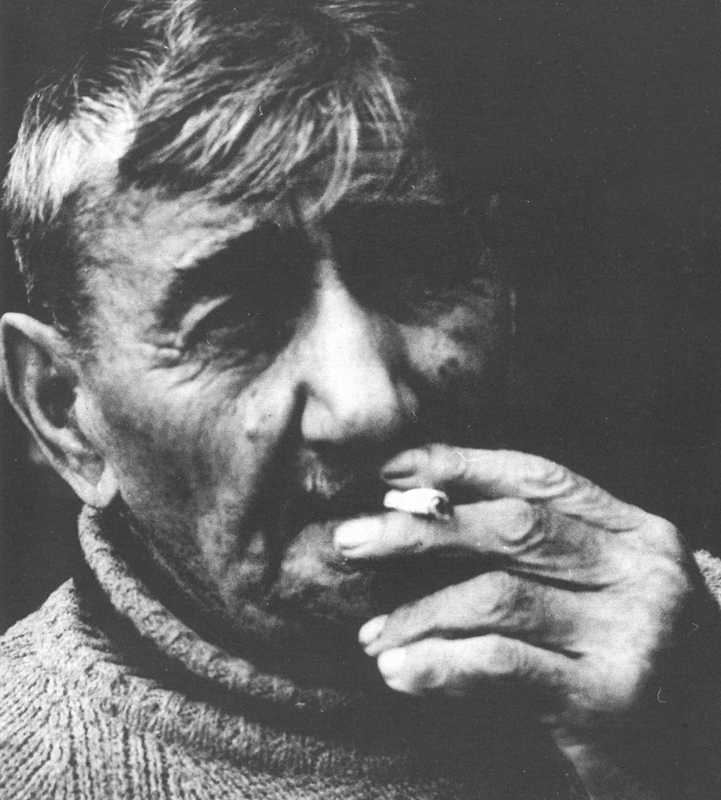
- Ilija Bašičević Bosilj
- Born: Ilija Bašičević Bosilj; July 18, 1895; Šid, Austro-Hungarian Empire
- Died: May 14, 1972 (aged 76); Šid, Yugoslavia
- Known for: Painter
- Movement: Outsider art, Naïve art
- Website: www.ilijabosilj.com

Ilija Bašičević, later Ilija "Bosilj" Bašičević (Serbian Cyrillic: Илија Башичевић Босиљ; July 18, 1895 – May 14, 1972) was a painter; a classic of Serbian Self-taught Art.

== Biography ==
Bašičević was born in Šid, which was part of the Austro-Hungarian Empire and is now in Serbia and died in 1972 in Šid. His parents were peasant farmers and he only received about four years of school before starting work on the farm. He left the country during both World War I to escape conscription and during World War II to avoid the Ustaše. He resisted collective farming and was periodically jailed on dubious charges by the political police.

He began painting in 1957. His first major showing was at a Belgrade gallery in 1963, and was very controversial because of Bašičeviċ's political stance. The painter took the surname "Bosilj" as a pseudonym for the showings. From the 1960s to the 1980s, his work was popular in Europe, often showcased in Zagreb and Belgrade but also Amsterdam and Paris. He donated his collection of paintings as a legacy to his native town. He died in Šid in 1972.

Ilija Bašičeviċ's son Dimitrije Bašičević was an art critic and became involved in a "naïve art" movement started by the USSR which rejected "decadent" modernism, and the father was inspired to paint. His son disapproved at first, because Ilija's work was not as precise or refined as the official Hlebene School's Reverse painting on glass techniques. Bašičeviċ's work is partially art brut and partially so-called 'naïve art' and most of his work is oil on canvas. Much of his work dealt with religion and folk legends and two-headed and two-faced creatures are a common theme. Unlike the traditional peasant style of his region, Bosilj created a flat two-dimensional world often inhabited by men and demons, snakes, fish, anthropomorphic creatures, and spacemen. He gave many of his paintings to found an art museum in his home town in 1970.

== Artistic Style ==
Ilija’s oeuvre can be classified into a few thematic units. Most numerous are the presentations of Biblical, especially Old Testament motifs. Next were motifs inspired by epics, legends and myths followed. In the Iliad Cycle, which has nothing in common with the famous Homerian epic but is related to the painter’s name, there are frequent artistic allusions to the real world and fights against human foolishness, duplicity, and hypocrisy. Then, he portrays the cycle with figures of real and imaginary animals. A significant part of his oeuvre includes the flying astrological beings. Ilija’s works are not descriptive, but are allegorical with multi-layered and symbolical context. He does not make difference between the presentation of an apocalyptic angel or modern astronaut, kings of Apocalypse and kings of Iliad, between a simple and an apocalyptic bird etc. Ilija creates the anti-illusionistic, the abstract. He does not use perspective; he eliminates reminiscences; he generalizes and prefigures by using symbols. Two-headed beings denote the duplicity of everything presented. In Biblical scenes or Serbian myths, legends and epics, the dynamics and morale prevail, while in scenes from Iliad we find humor, irony and grotesque. In these presentations, the artist tried to demythologize Biblical heroes and historical characters. His works are not descriptive, since they are the product of a self-taught visionary and instinctive neo-primitive. He most often used allegory with a multi-layered connotation. The mere names of his paintings, like in Sekulić and Jakić, help us to get acquainted with his world full of personal symbolism. He created in anti-illusionist and abstract manner, eliminated reminiscences and generalized due to his purely authentic understanding of the realistic. Ilija’s dynamic treatment of the colored structure points to outstandingly modern dimension of his pictorial expression. The backgrounds in his paintings are often empty and flat, while rhythmically sequenced figures are floating, animated with wavy lines. The colour is raw, of visible ductus. Golden background is characteristic in the paintings of the special cycle.

== Exhibitions and awards ==
He had exhibitions in the country and abroad and was awarded many times. He is the greatest representative of art brut in Serbia. On the Third Triennial of Naive Art in Bratislava in 1972, Ilija was posthumously awarded special recognition by an international Jury for his achievements in the domain of naïve and marginal art. The greatest collection of his paintings is in the Museum Ilijanum, in Šid (Serbia). His works are also part of the Zander Collection in Cologne, the Museum of Everything in London, the Museum of Contemporary Art, Belgrade and the Centre Pompidou in Paris. He is a worldly classic.

== Solo Exhibitons (selected) ==
- 2025: Ilija Bosilj: The Triumph of Art. Serbian Academy of Sciences and Arts, Belgrad
- 2024/2025: Ilija – Ein Tuch mit zwei Gesichtern. Open art museum, St. Gallen
- 2021: Ilija Bosilj Bašičević: Tales from Parallel Universes. Cavin-Morris Gallery, New York
- 2019: Ilija - Mangelos Phenomenon. Goethe-Institut, Belgrad
- 2018: Welcoming the Two Faced Rider: Paintings by Ilija Bosilj Bašičević. Cavin-Morris Gallery, New York
- 2011: Ilija’s World, Museum of Contemporary Art of Istria, Pula
- 2010: The Conceiving's of Ilija Bosilj, Nationalmuseum, Zrenjanin
- 2009: Ilija: Journeys in the Imagination. John Michael Kohler Arts Center, Sheboygan
- 2008: Ilija. Museum Haus Cajeth, Heidelberg
- 1973: Ateneum, Helsinki
- 1969: Galerie Hilt, Basel
- 1969: Galerie Mokum, Amsterdam
- 1967: Haus Nied, Frankfurt/Main
- 1967: Galerie Neuhaus, München
- 1965: Galerie des Studentenzentrums, Zagreb
- 1964: Galerie Deposito, Genua
- 1963: Belgrad

== Gallery ==
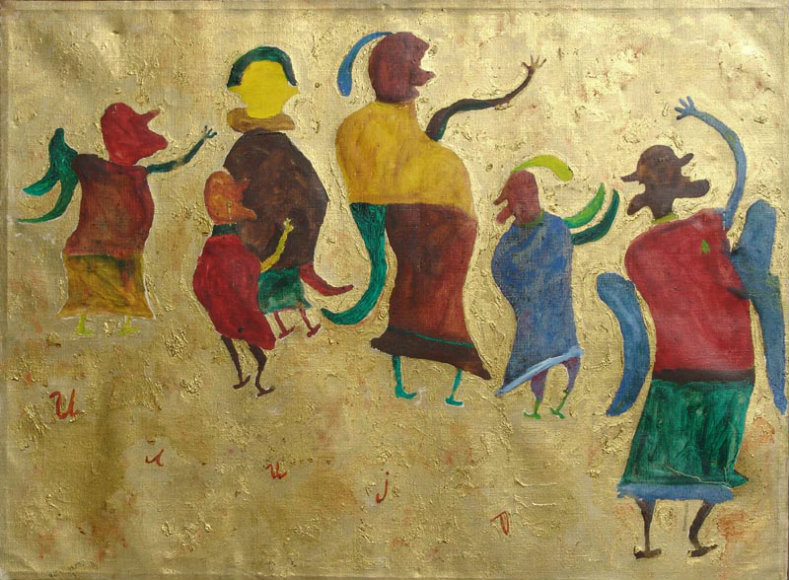
The Arrival of Astronauts on the Moon, 1965
oil on canvas, 50x67cm
MNMA, Jagodina

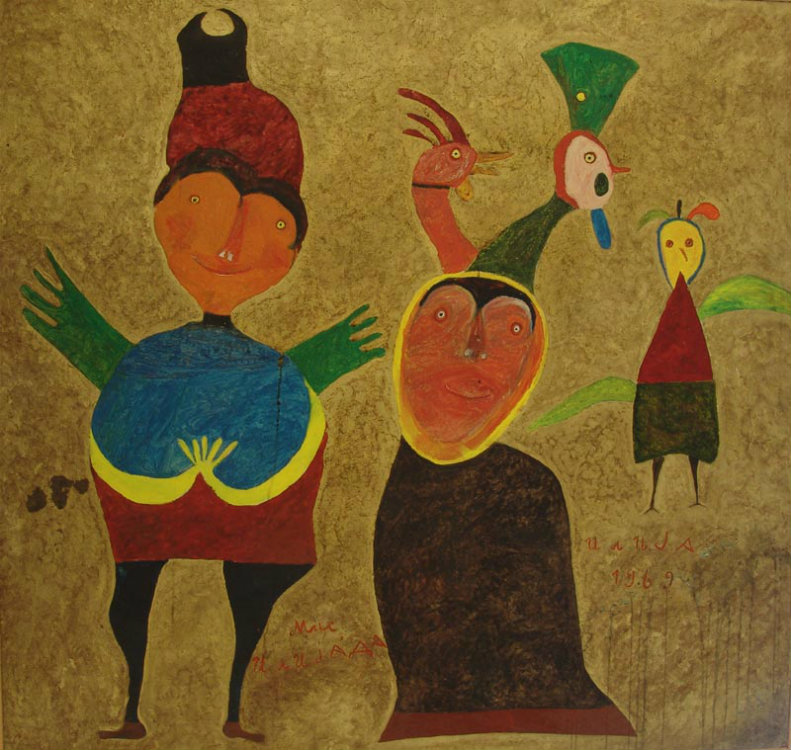
Miss Iliad, 1969
oil on fiber board, 115x120cm
MNMA, Jagodina

== See also ==
- List of Serbian painters

== Literature ==
- Н. Крстић, Наивна и маргинална уметност Србије, монографија, МНМУ, Јагодина, 2007
- N. Krstić, Outsiders, catalogue, MNMU, Jagodina, 2013
- N. Krstić, Outsider Art in Serbia, MNMA, Јагодина, 2014
- Anatole Jakovsky: Peintres naïfs - Lexikon der Laienmaler aus aller Welt. First Edition. Basilius Presse Basel, 1976
- Otto und Lise Bihalji-Merin, Ingrid Krause: Die Kunst der Naiven. Themen und Beziehungen. 1. Auflage. Verlag: Haus der Kunst, Munich 1975
