= Stefan Likić =

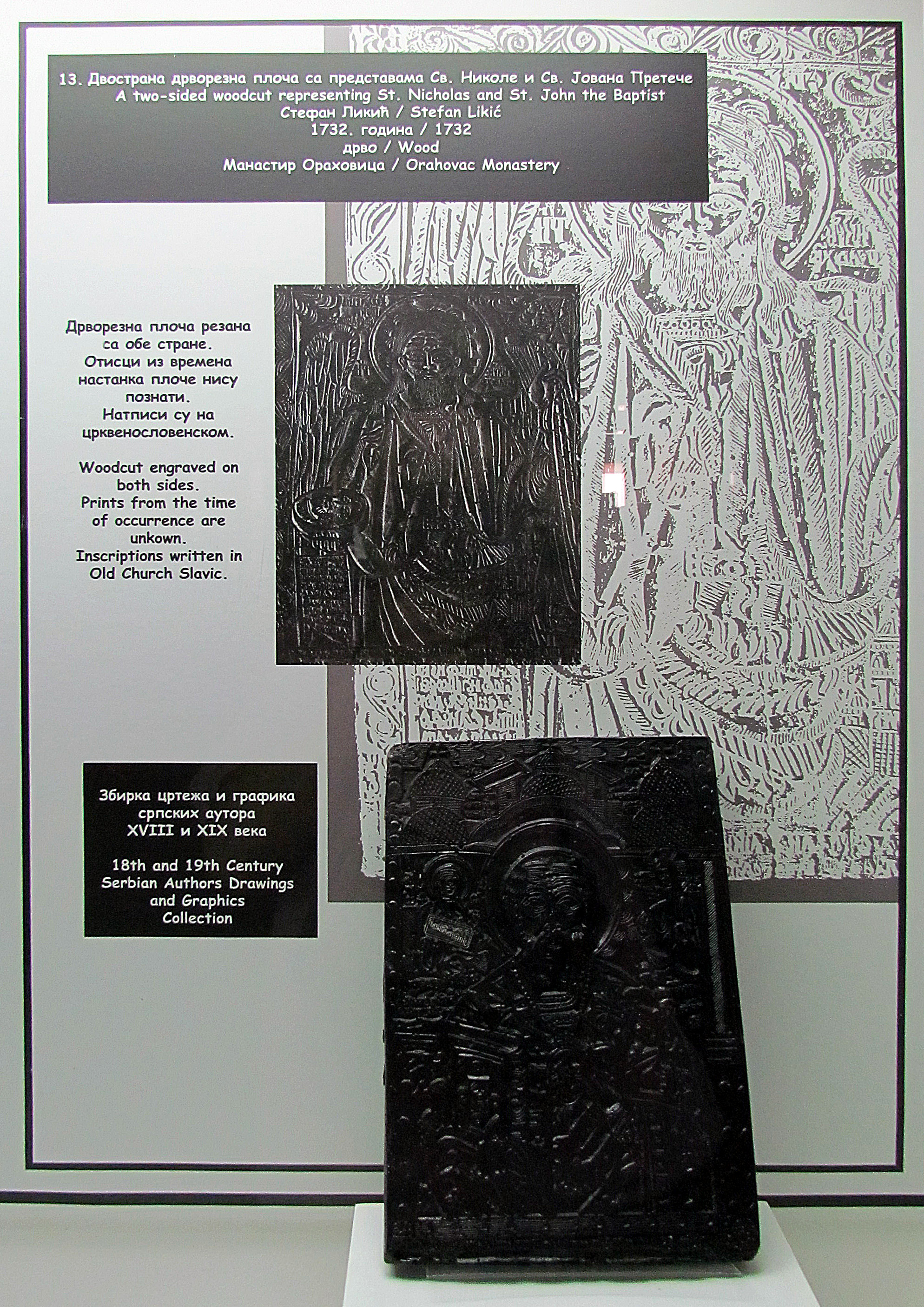
Two-sided woodcut representing St. Nicolas and St. John the Baptist by Stefan Likic, 1732

Stefan Likić (Srem, c. 1680 - Slavonia, c. 1750) was a Serbian graphic artist and master woodcarver from the first half of the 18th century. His works are on display at the Serbian Orthodox Church Museum in Belgrade.

Stefan Likić was a priest and an artist—a master in woodcuts—who worked for churches and monasteries, including Lepavina Monastery, in Slavonia during the height of the Habsburg Empire. Many icons were attributed to him; Deesis of Saint Simeon and Saint Sava (1712); Antimension of Christ with the Apostles (1724); and two-sided woodcut representing St. Nicholas and St. John the Baptist (1732).

== See also ==
- List of painters from Serbia
