= Janja Moler =

Serbian iconographer

Jovan Stergević also spelled Jovan Stergijević, though better known as Janja Moler (c. 1780–1841) was a Serbian iconographer who lived and worked in Serbia.

== Biography ==
Most icons of the old churches in Kragujevac are the work of zograf (means painter in Serbian) Jovan Stergević (also spelled Sterijević), best known by his nickname Janja Moler, who left Old Serbia in the early 1820 and settled with his family at Kragujevac. There he earned the trust of Miloš Obrenović who employed him as his court artist and commissioned him to paint his foundation, the Church of the Holy See in 1823 The wooden church was replaced by the Holy Trinity Church in 1892-1894, however, the iconostasis and the icons painted by Janja Moler and other artists and craftsmen remained until this day.

He painted many iconostasis and icons in various churches throughout Serbia, such as the Topčider Church, Soko Banja, Smederevska Palanka, Osipaonica, Jagodina, Savinca, Pozarevac, and others. The iconostases in the wooden church of Brzan (built in 1822) and the Church of Archangel Gabriel in Bagrdan (built in 1833) were painted by Jovan Stergevic.

== See also ==
- List of Serbian painters
