= Živko Pavlović (painter) =

Serbian icon painter

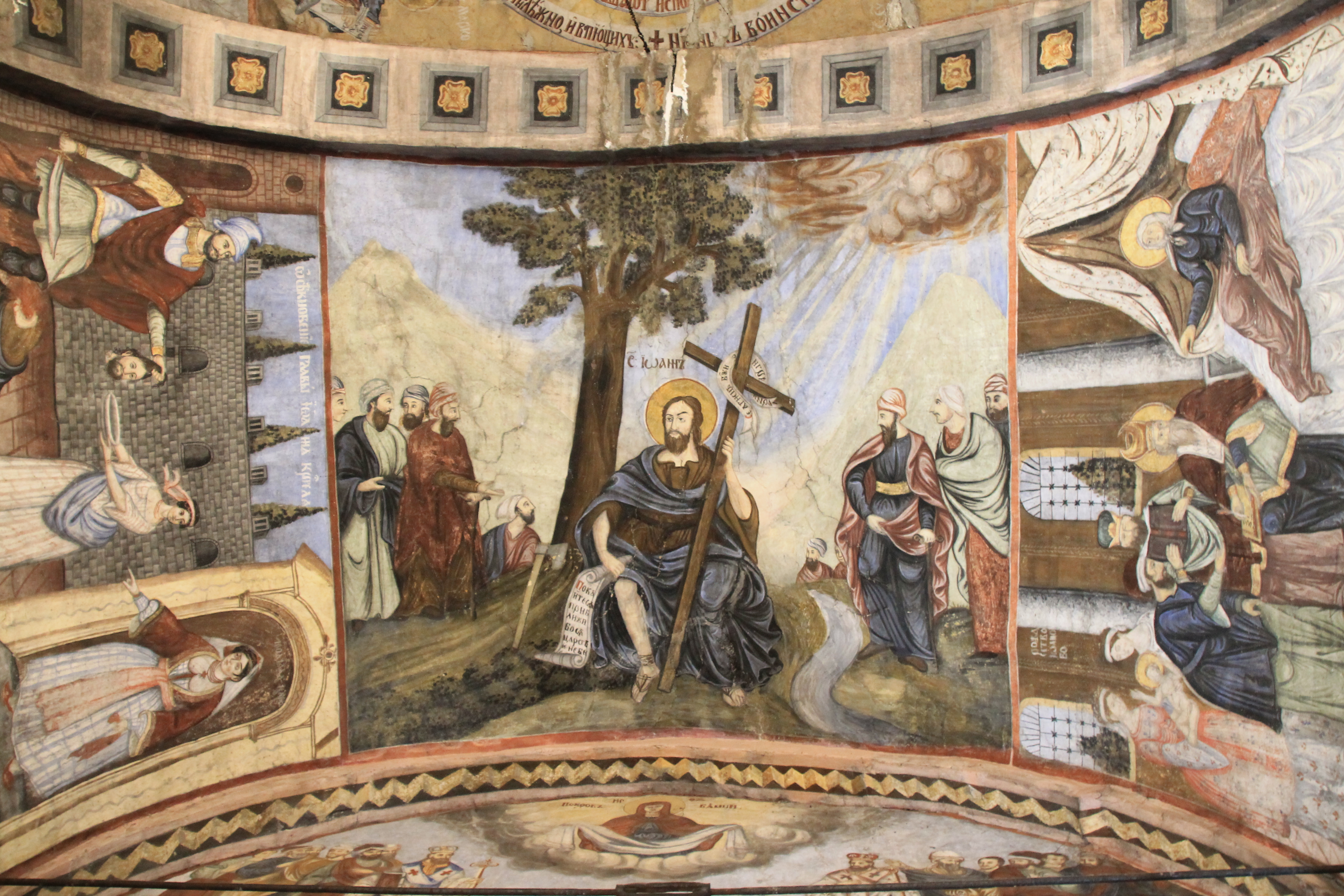
Painted ceilings of Zaova Monastery, 1845-49

Živko Pavlović, also known as Moler Požarevački (19th century), was a Serbian icon painter.

Pavlović was taught painting by Josif Petrović (1825–1877), the son of priest Jakov Petrović.

He painted the Church of St. Nicholas in 1825 in his native village of Kisiljevo, the iconostasis of the Church of the Assumption of the Lord in Čačak, from 1841 to 1845, the iconostasis and the wall paintings of Zaova Monastery between 1845 and 1849.

Živko Pavlović also collaborated with other artists on Serbian Orthodox Church commissions. For example, he and Jovan Stergević (better known as Jania Moler) painted the iconostasis of the Church of St. Stephen in Ivanjica (1836–1838), and with Nikola Janković of Ohrid—the icons for the Sretenje monastery in 1844. He also worked at Nimnik Monastery in 1841. In 1847 he painted the Gornjak Monastery.

He died in 1851.

== See also ==
- List of painters from Serbia
