= Stepan Kolesnikoff =

Russian painter (1879–1955)

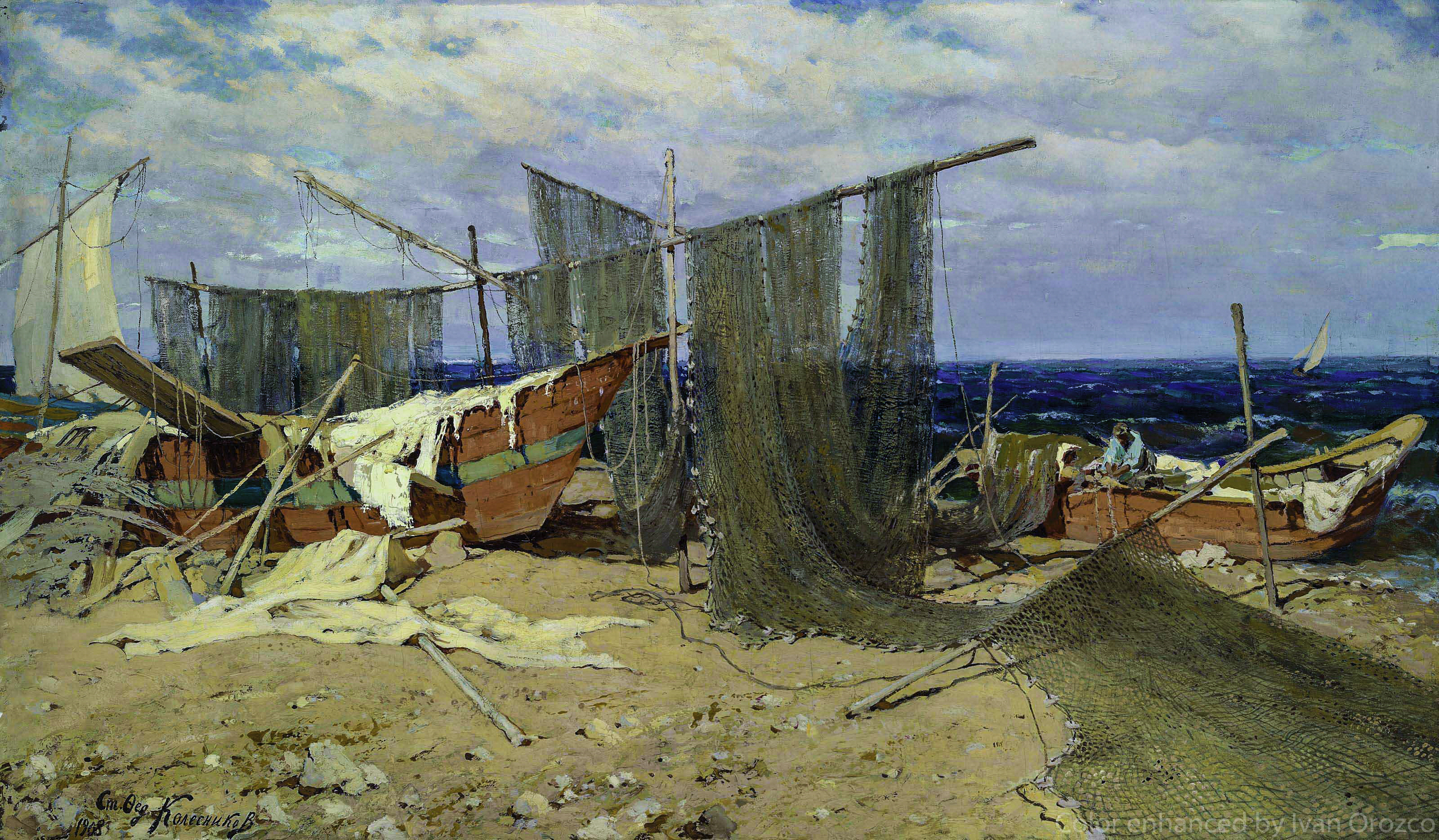
on the seashore (enhanced by Ivan Orozco)

Stepan Fedorovitch Kolesnikoff (Russian: Степан Федорович Колесников; 1879 - 1955), was a distinguished Realist painter, born in Ukraine who worked most of his life in Serbia, Yugoslavia.

== Biography ==
Kolesnikoff was born in a peasant family in the southern province of the Russian Empire. His artistic potentials were recognized early. In 1897 he started attending an art school in Odessa, one of the topmost of its kind in the country. In 1903, Kolesnikoff was accepted into the Imperial Academy of Arts, where his paintings regularly won prizes in the annual Spring exhibitions.

His prolific work in oil and gouache won him high regard from the foremost Russian artist of his day Ilya Repin, as evidenced from the contents of their correspondence, now in the Russian archives.

In 1919 he and his family emigrated to the Balkans, and in 1920 he settled in Belgrade, Kingdom of Serbs, Croats and Slovenes, (Yugoslavia after 1929) where he spent the rest of his life as an immigrant. Kolesnikoff was promptly welcomed in the royal court of his new country. Among others, he was given a state assignment to lead the restoration works on numerous paintings and frescoes.

For the last twelve years of his life, Kolesnikoff suffered from Parkinson's' disease. His remains are buried in the Russian Necropolis, a section of the Belgrade New Cemetery.

== Work ==
His favourite subject was a description of Southern Russian and Ukrainian nature in the times of its rapid awakening - melting snows, floods and spring days. He also enjoyed painting domestic compositions, inhabited by people and domestic animals. At the same time on his canvases, you can rarely see the marked faces of characters. Favourite same colours - blue or bright orange. During the World War I, he turned to the military theme, creating a series of works that evoked a positive response. Kolesnikov is also known for creating numerous sketches from life and preparing sketches, very rich and varied in content.

Among other things, Kolesnikov was a member of the Russian society "Community of Artists" and the European society "Leonardo da Vinci".

== See also ==
- List of Serbian painters
- Milan Arsić-Daskalo
