= Frano Menegello Dinčić =

Yugoslav medalist and sculptor

Frano Menegello Dinčić also spelled Frano Meneghello Dinčić (28 February 1900 in Kotor, Montenegro – 1986 in Belgrade, Yugoslavia) was a Yugoslav medalist and sculptor from Dalmatia.

== Biography ==
He was born into a naval family, originally from Hvar. He lived in Split where he graduated from the School of Applied Arts and later the Academy Fine Arts in Prague, in the class of Professor Otakar Španiel. He further refined his skills in Paris and Munich. Before leaving for Belgrade in 1928, he worked from 1922 to 1924 as a lecturer in Split. He was a member of the Society of Fine Artists of Serbia. Menegello's artistic work was accomplished in relief modeling, including plastic portrait painting, which ensured the quality of his portrait medals, memorials, plaques and monuments. Vladeta Vojinović's research shows that the Order of the People's Hero (type 2), created at the ICOM in Zagreb, was designed by Frano Meneghello Dinčić.

== Works ==
- 10 Dinar coin
- 20 Dinar coin
- Medal of Nada Todorović
- Bust of Nikola Tesla at Charles University in Prague, 1933
- Bust of King Peter II of Yugoslavia, 1939
- Plaque of Svetozar Marković
- Plaque of Branko Radičević
- Plaque of Jovan Sterija Popović
- Plaque of Vuk Karadžić

== See also ==
- List of painters from Serbia
