= Anastas Bocarić =

Serbian painter

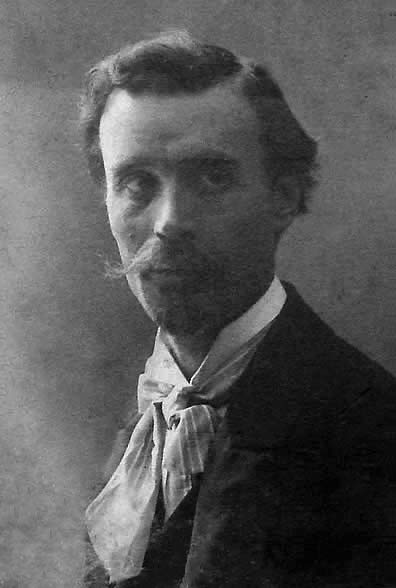
Anastas Bocarić, a photo by Milan Jovanović

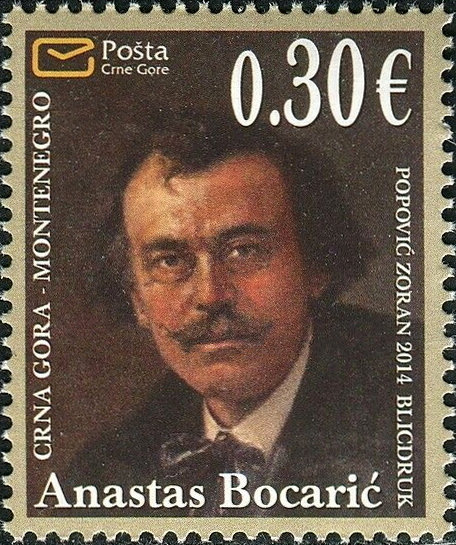
Anastas Bocarić on a 2014 stamp of Montenegro

Anastas Bocarić (1 January 1864 – 17 April 1944) was a Serbian painter.

== Biography ==
He was born in Budva in the Kingdom of Dalmatia, part of the Austrian Empire (modern-day Montenegro). His father was Evangel Bocarić and mother Anđelka Raičević. At the age of fourteen, he left his parents' home and went to study painting at the Academy of Fine Arts in Athens. In 1883 he returned to his homeland for the sake of making portraits of Petrović dynasty, as well as prominent citizens of Budva and Kotor. In 1891, in Zadar, he married Anna Tofolo, with whom he had a son Sava and daughters Milica and Marija. He moved to Zagreb the following year. In addition to working on portraits, he also made religious compositions for Serbian Orthodox churches there. In 1896 he was already in Mostar, where his younger brother Špiro Bocarić joined him in 1897. They were the originators of the first, modern civic portraits in Bosnia and Herzegovina. In 1897 he moved to Sarajevo with his family. The image of "Guslar in the choir" was a reason because of which he had to flee to Belgrade before the Austro-Hungarian authorities. In the latter year of the 19th century, a plaster bust of Prince Nicholas I of Montenegro was made, so it is assumed that he resided in Montenegro that year.

In 1900 he participated in the Exposition Universelle or better known as the World Exhibition in Paris, representing the Kingdom of Serbia. In the same year, he went to Istanbul to teach for the next five or six years. During this period, he designed the emblem of Ethiopia, which was in official use until 1975 and was commissioned for Emperor of Ethiopia Menelik II. From 1906 to 1908, he moved from Constantinople to Skopje where he continued to teach. In 1909 he ran the Balkan Art School in Thessaloniki. As of 1911 to 1932 he lived in Novi Sad and worked as a professor at the Women's School. Bocarić intensified his work on religious compositions and painted portraits of distinguished personalities living then in Vojvodina. In 1932 he settled in Perast where he continued to do what he preferred the most and that was painting portraits. There he also collaborated with like-minded painters who identified themselves with the same group of academically-trained, artists from the region.

He died in Perast in 1944.

== Painting ==
At its core, Bocarić was a romantic, he found reality in the nature of the story, but in his paintings, he could find a foothold in contemporary solutions as well as in his Woman in White. Painting a slender figure in a peplos, with a mantle on her right shoulder, Bocarić, through decorative elements (carpet and curtains in the background, linear rhythms), experiences the art of French masters, perhaps most of Théodore Chassériau, a master of decorative style. Many of the portraits that Bocarić did in Mostar and in Sarajevo are a series of parade creations, often made from photographs.

Painting by Anastas Bocarić is really just a vestibule of Serbian modern art. Its true beginning can be accurately determined by the fact that zoographic painting pressed these spaces until the end of the nineteenth century.

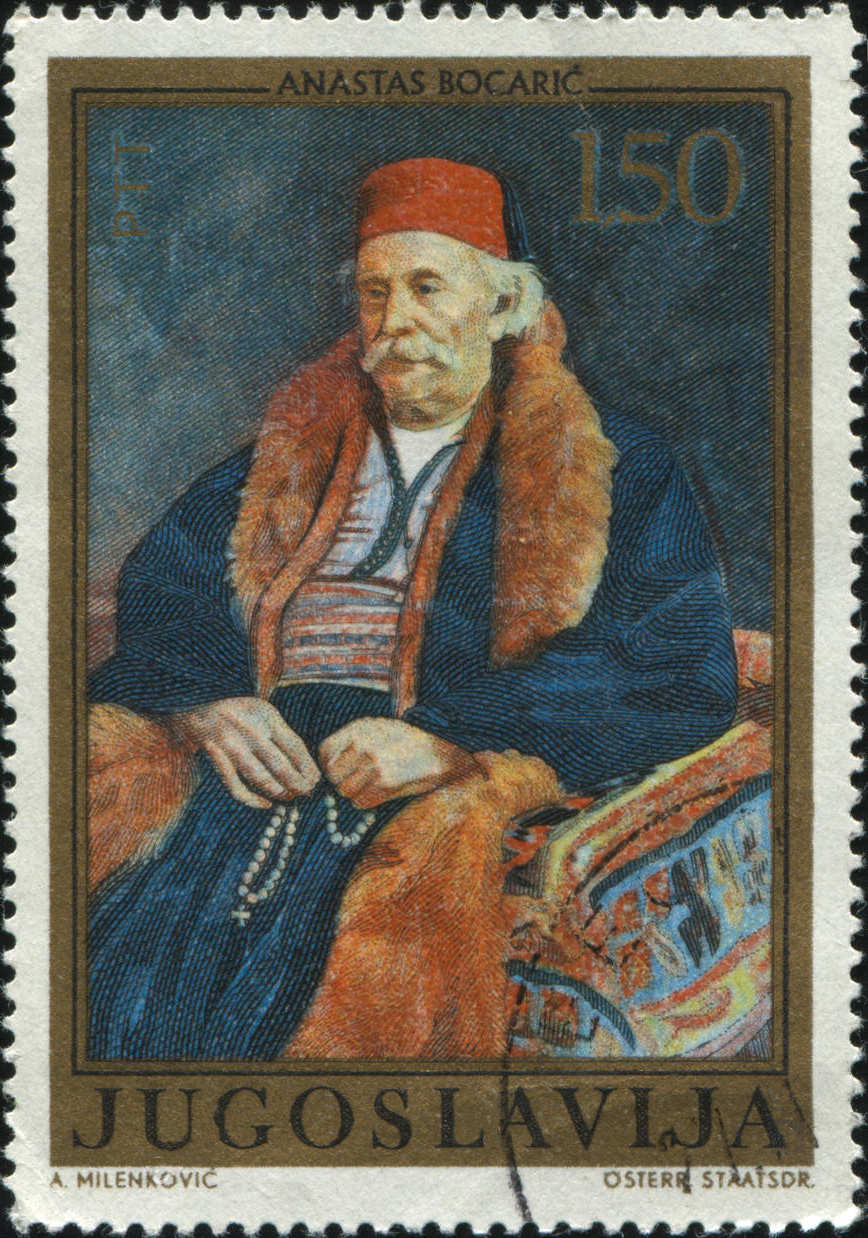
Merchant Ivanisevic

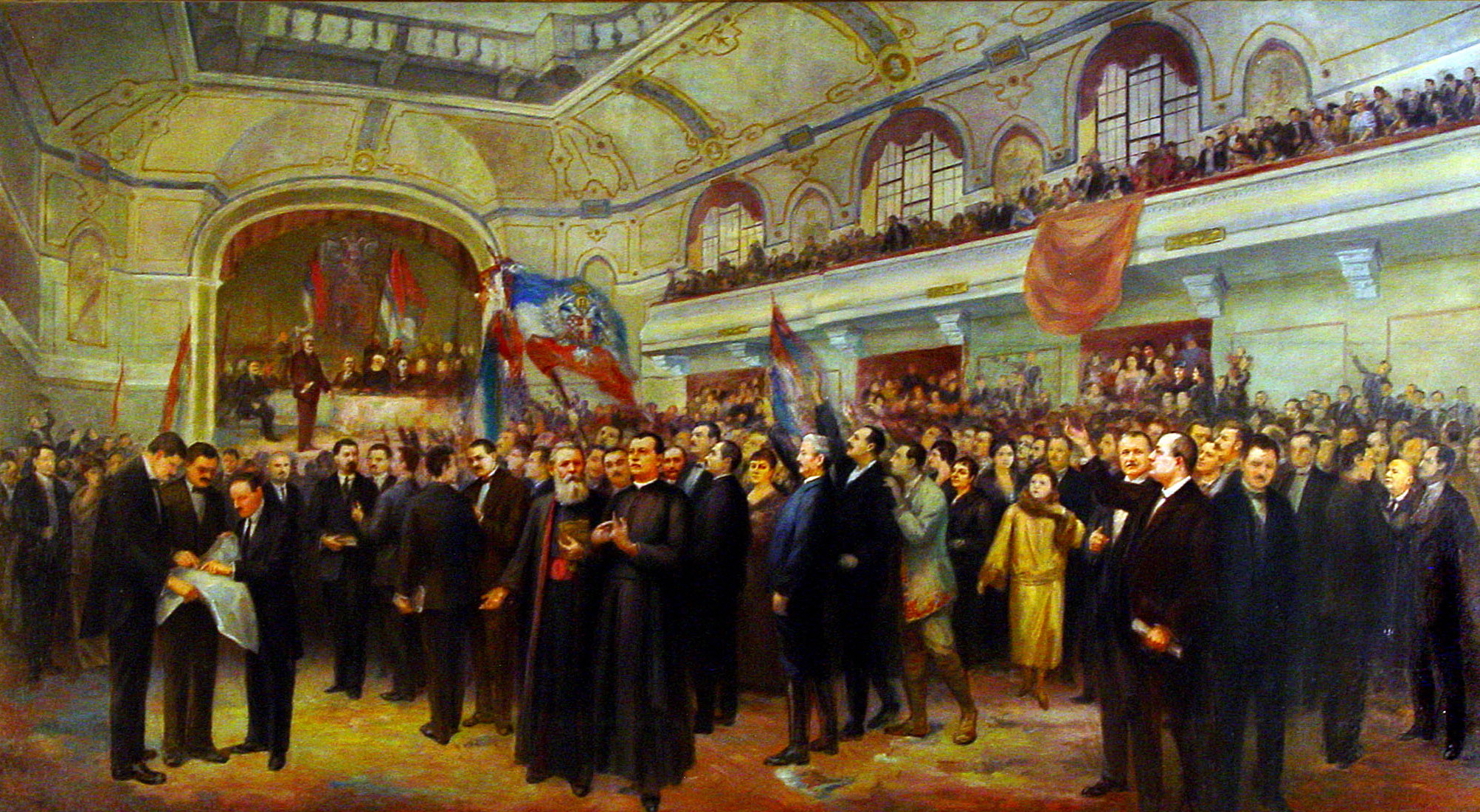
Great People's Assembly of Serbs, Bunjevci and other Slavs in Banat, Bačka and Baranja, held in Novi Sad on November 25, 1918. The assembly proclaimed joining of Banat, Bačka and Baranja regions to the Kingdom of Serbia.

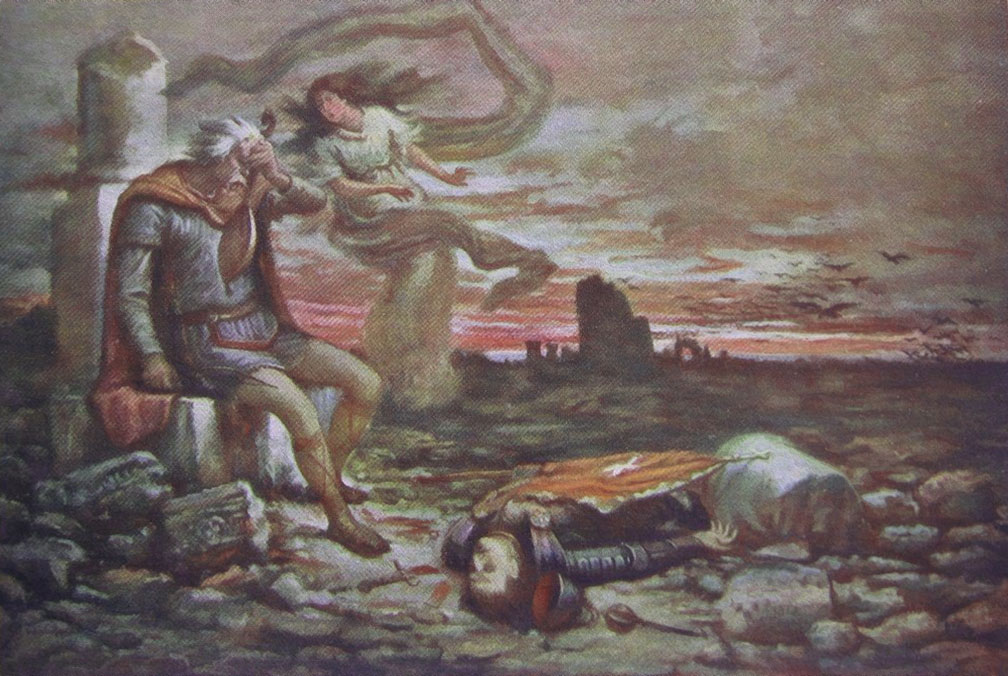
Destruction of the Serbian Empire on Kosovo 1389

== See also ==
- List of Serbian painters
