= Danica Jovanović =

Serbian painter

Danica Jovanović (4 January 1886 – 12 September 1914) was a Serbian painter. She was part of a generation of Serbian modernists who began their art education at the beginning of the 20th century, whose creative rise was interrupted by the Balkan Wars and the First World War. Jovanović was accused of patriotism and was executed in the Petrovaradin fortress at the beginning of World War I.

== Biography ==
Jovanović was born in Beška as the fifth child into a peasant family. She was educated by her professor and director of the Girls' High School in Novi Sad, Arkady Varađanin, the Serbian Women's Charity Association from Novi Sad, and the Dunđerski family. At the age of eighteen she enrolled the Higher Serbian Girls' School in Novi Sad (1903-1907), then continued her education at the School of Arts and Crafts in Belgrade (1907-1909) with Beta Vukanović and in Munich at the Women's Academy of Painting (1909 - 1914). Along with her training in painting, she was also involved in the activities of the Serbian patriotic association Srbadija in Munich. During her schooling in Belgrade and Munich, as well as during her summer vacations in Beška, she painted intensively, which resulted in an artistic legacy containing hundreds of works.

In 2014, an exhibition of her work was held by Odbrana Media Center in cooperation with the Pavle Beljanski Memorial Collection and Matica Srpska Gallery.

== See also ==
- List of Serbian painters
