= Radomir Damnjanović Damnjan =

Serbian painter and conceptual artist (1935–2025)

- Радомир Дамњановић Дамњан
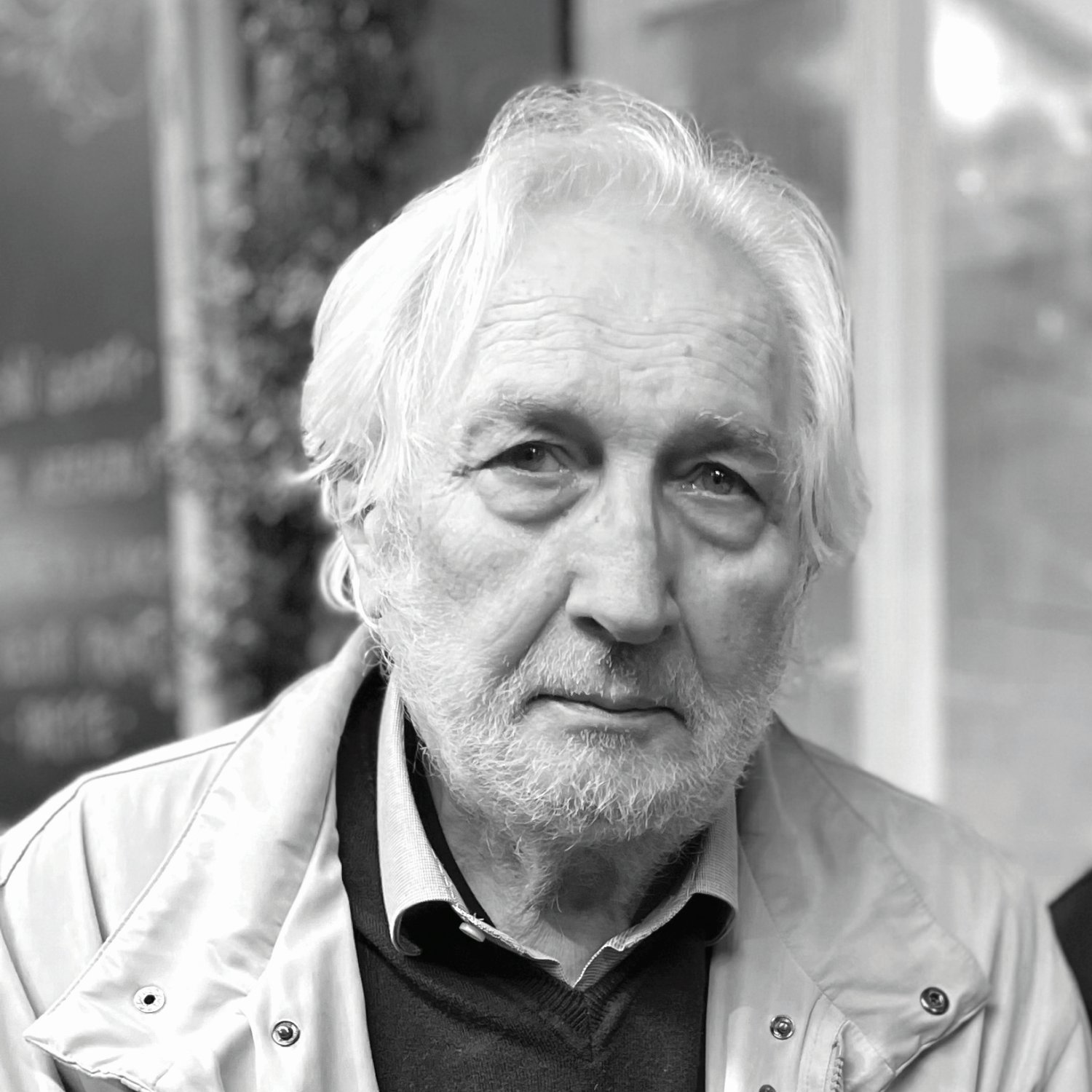
- Born: Radomir Damnjanović Damnjan; 10 December 1935; Mostar, Kingdom of Yugoslavia
- Died: 10 July 2025 (aged 89); Milan, Italy
- Known for: Conceptual art
- Website: radomirdamnjan.com

Radomir Damnjanović Damnjan (Serbian Cyrillic: Радомир Дамњановић Дамњан; 10 December 1935 – 10 July 2025) was a Serbian-Italian painter and conceptual artist.

== Early life and education ==
Damnjan spent his childhood in Belgrade and eventually graduated from the Academy of Fine Arts in Belgrade in 1957 and completed his postgraduate studies there in 1959.

In 1971 until 1972, he went to America studying as a Fulbright scholar.

== Art ==
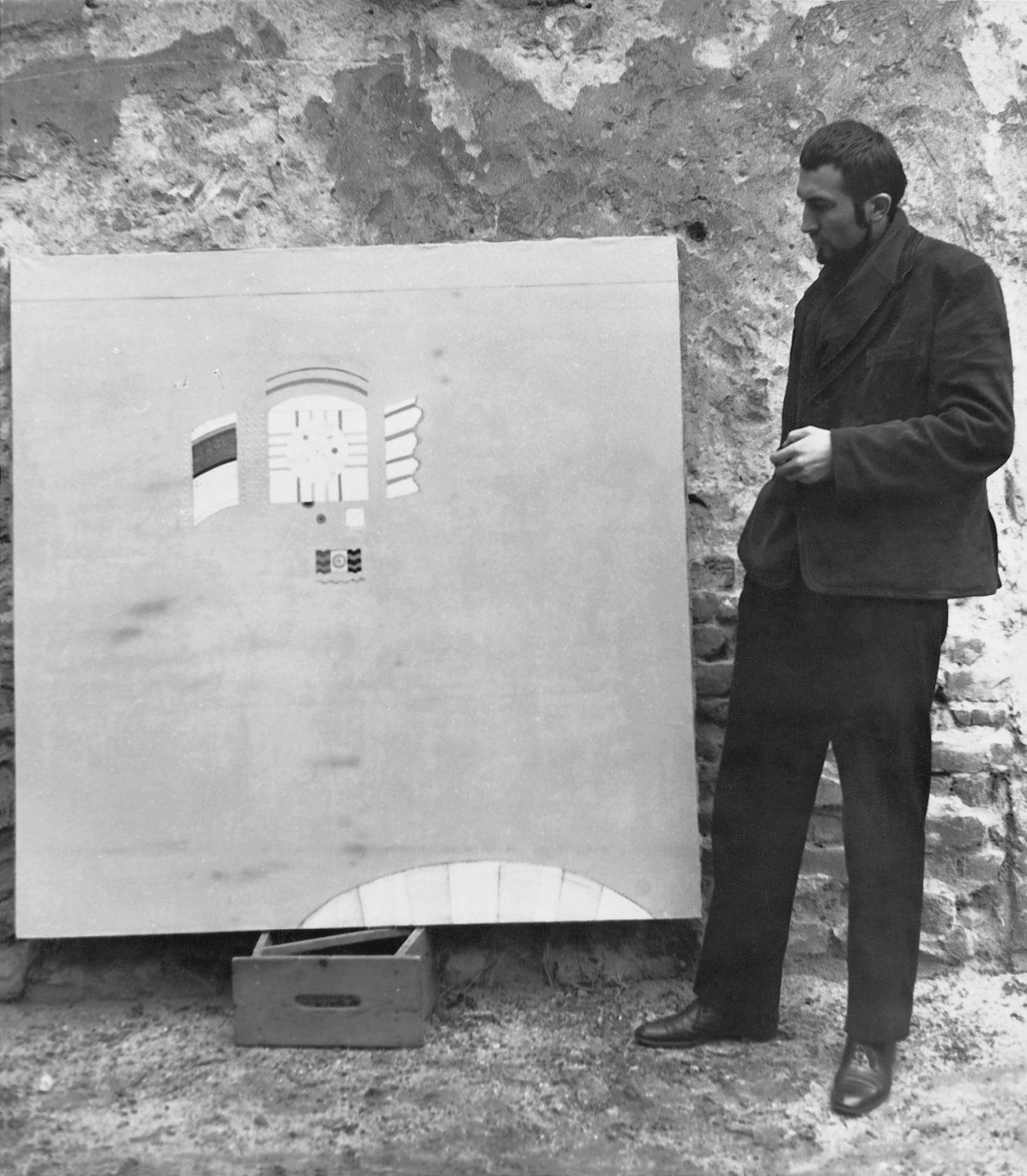
Radomir Damnjanović Damnjan in front of his work, 1962

Throughout his career, Damnjan experimented with different mediums or art such as paintings, drawings, graphics, photography, and film. In the early years of his career, he worked on art which focused on minimalism, abstract art and symbolic art with series including Sandy Shores (1961) and Elements in Space (1963–64).

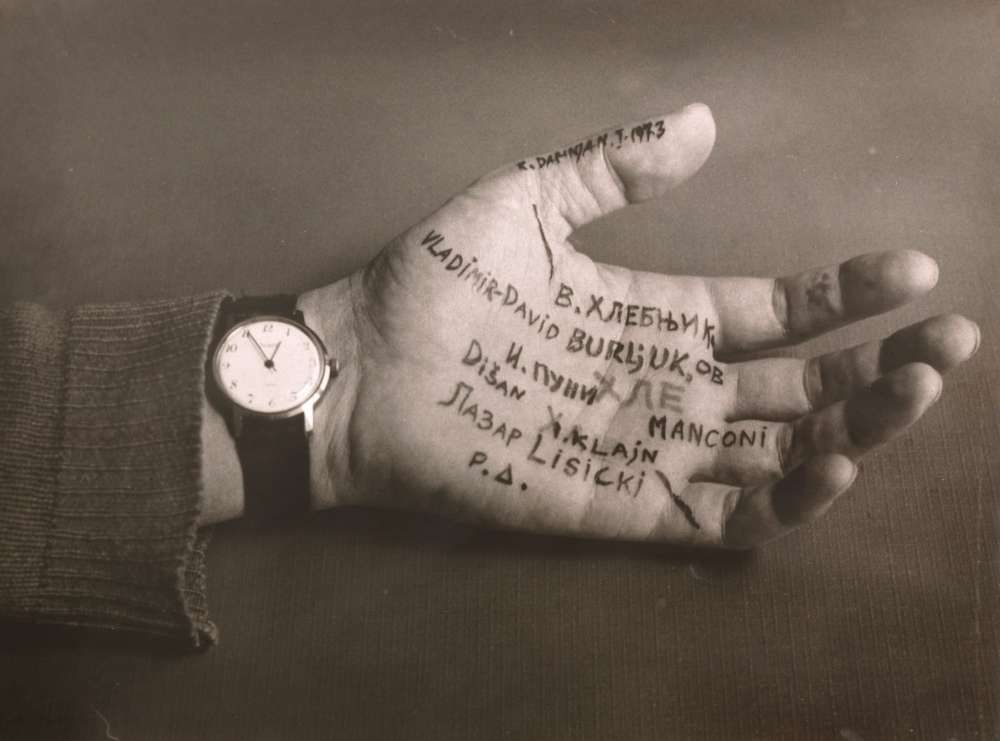
Radomir Damnjanović Damnjan, In Honor of Soviet Avant-garde, 1973, b/w photograph, 295 × 397 mm

From 1990s, he worked on paintings more focused on portraits and self-portraits which he describes as "new pointillism".

== Death ==
Damnjan died in Milan, Italy, on 10 July 2025, at the age of 89.

== Selected artwork ==
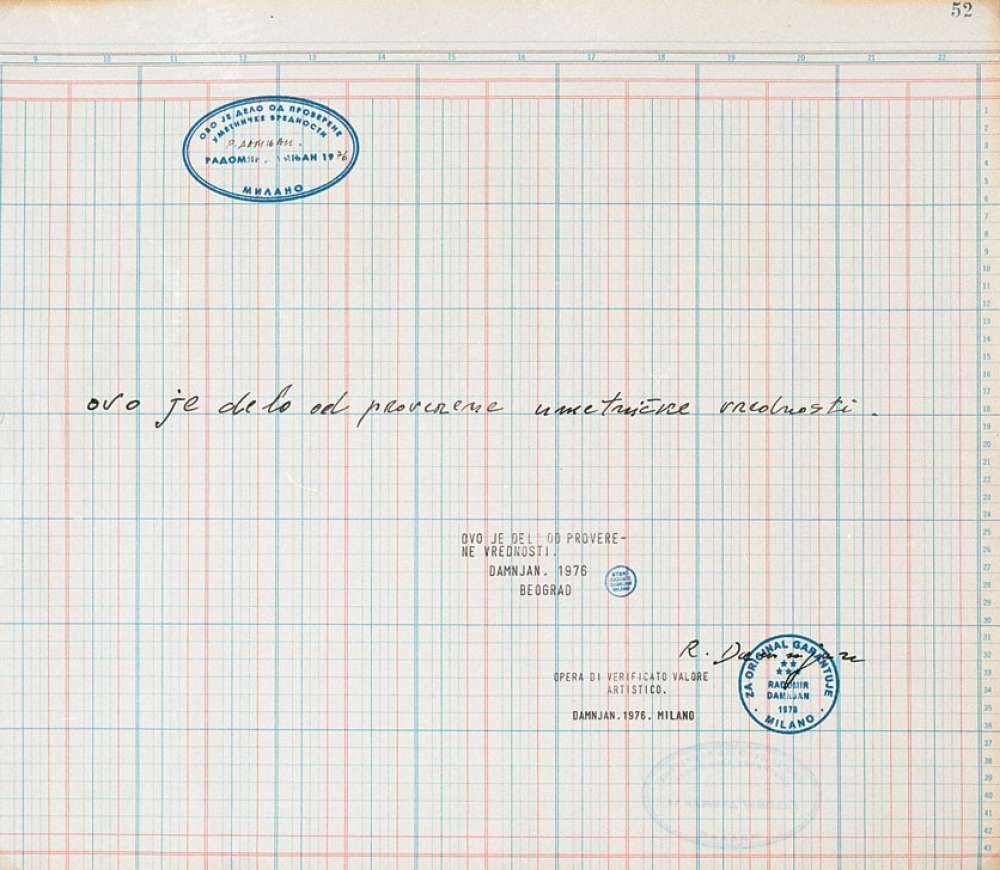
This is a Work with Certified Artistic Value, 1976, mixed media, 316 × 365 mm

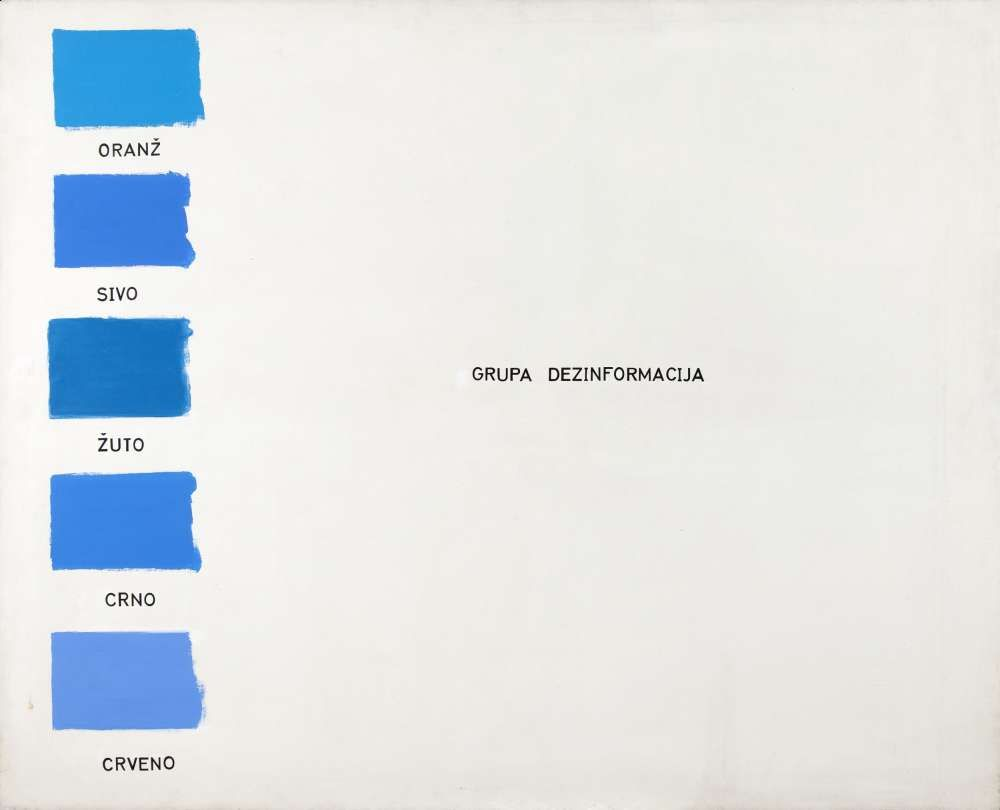
Group of Disinformations, 1973, oil on canvas, 1200 × 1445 mm

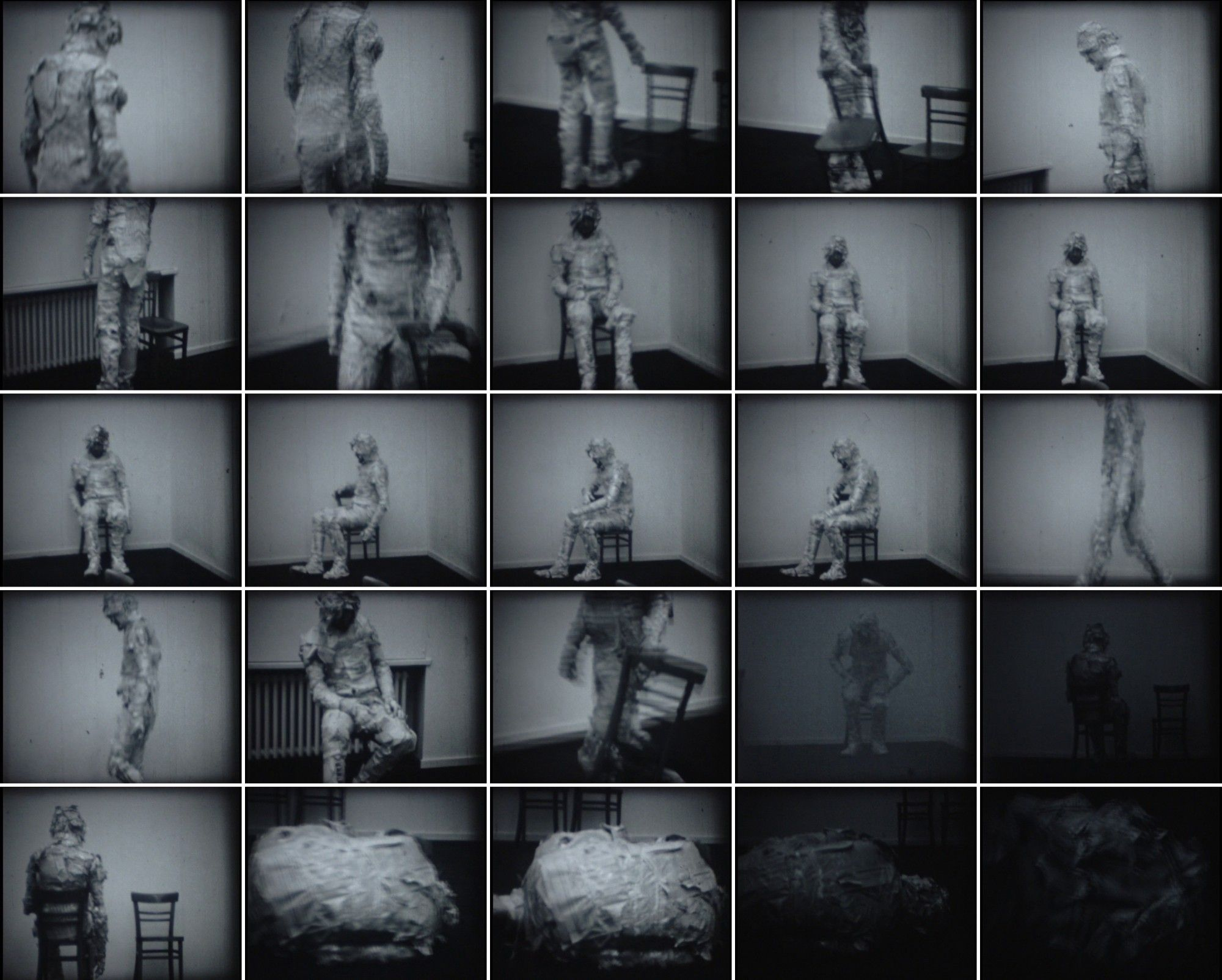
Man Made of Newspaper or the Possibility for Communication, 1973, 8 mm film, b/w, silent, 1′11″

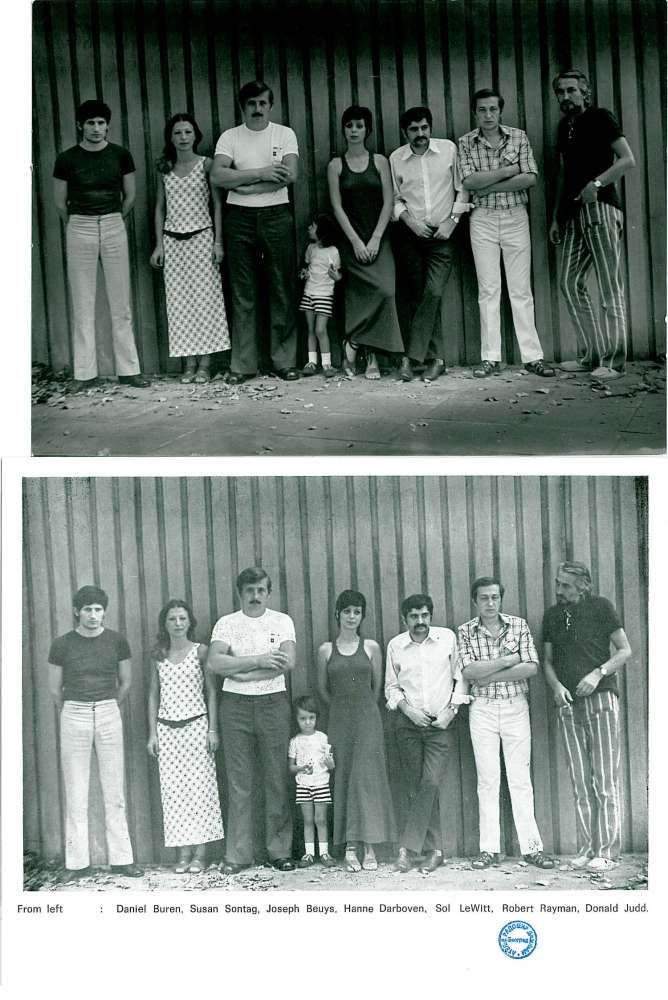
Misinformation, 1973, b/w photograph, 279 × 190 mm

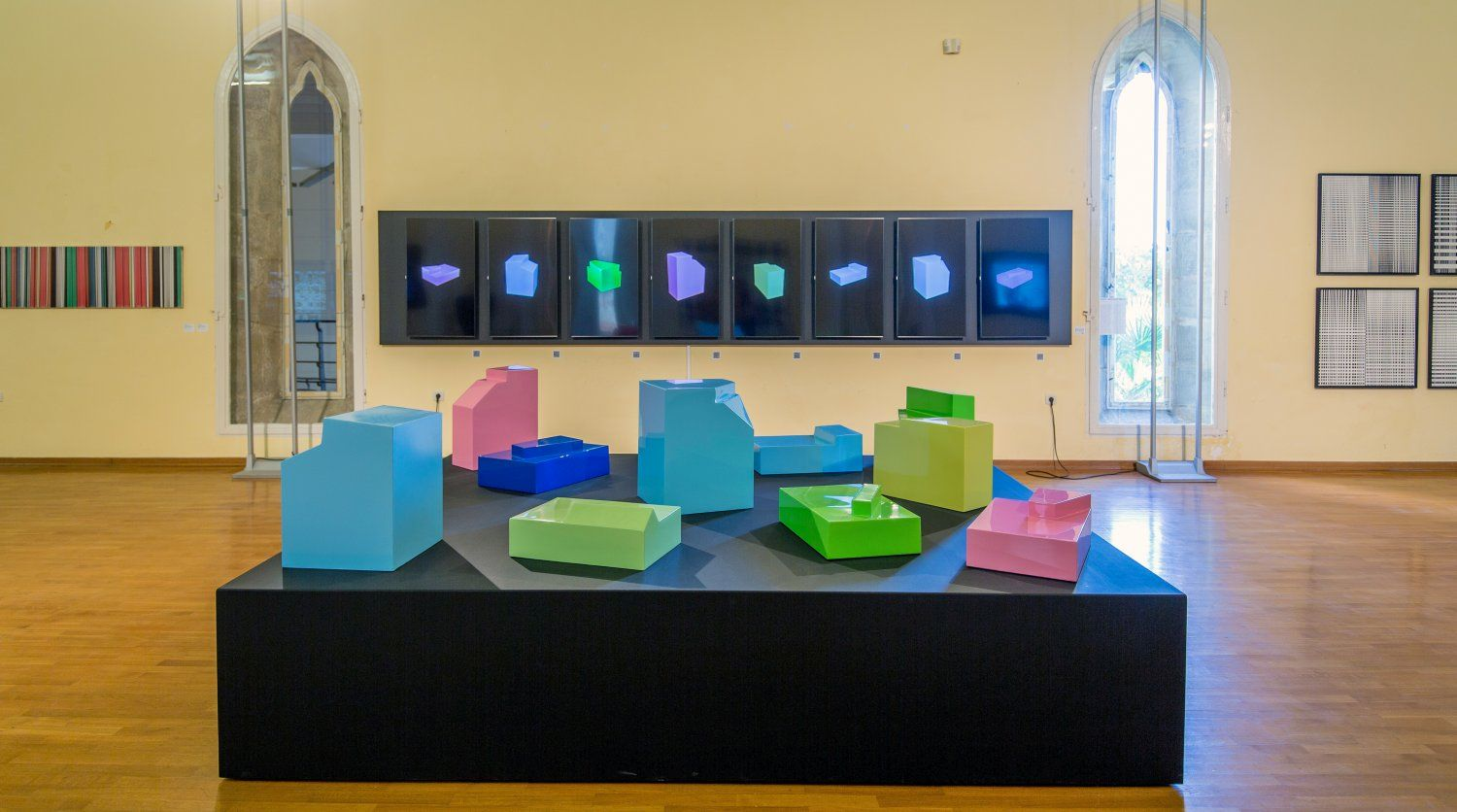
New Fundamental Tendencies, Poreč, Croatia, 2022

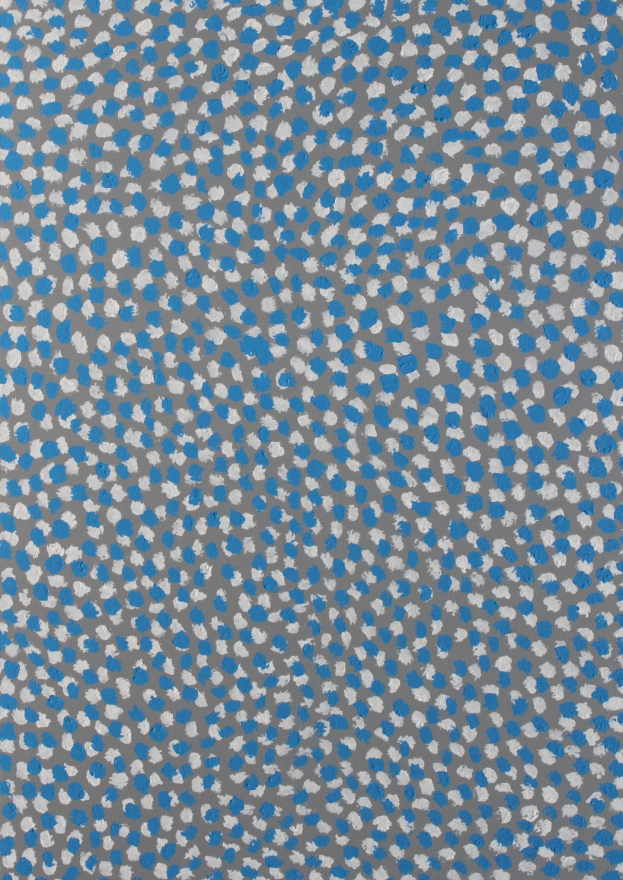
work from the Painting series, 2000s

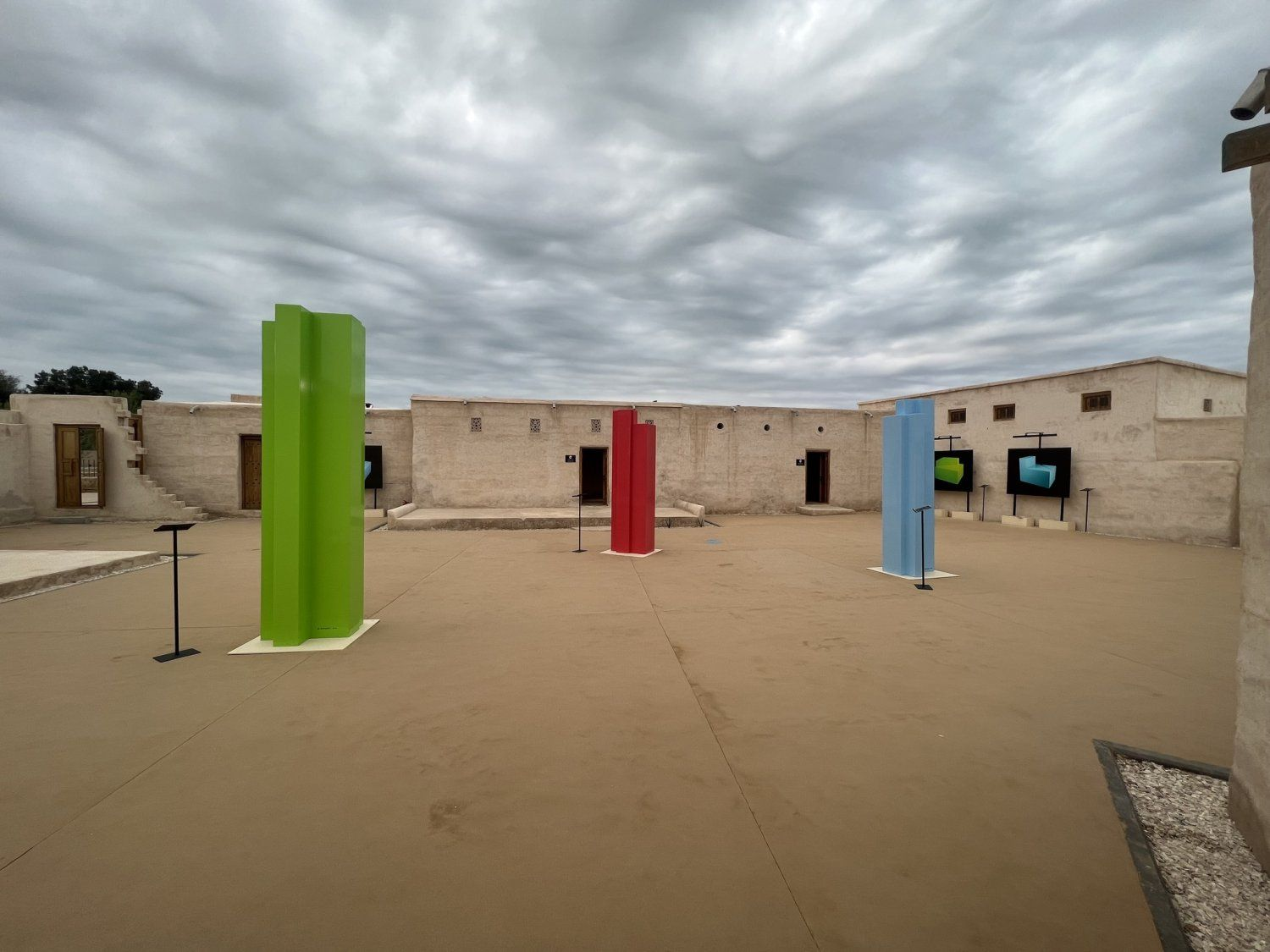
Damnjan's works at the Ras Al Khaimah Fine Arts Festival (RAKFAF), United Arab Emirates, 2024

== Performances ==
The list includes:

- 1973 – The Man from the Newspaper or the Ability to Communicate, 12 min, Gallery of the Student Cultural Center, Belgrade
- 1975 – Identity: The Destruction of Books, Marx, Hegel and the Bible, 25 min, Trigon '75, Graz
- 1976 – Dinner with Terry Doxey from London, 30 min, Gallery of the Student Cultural Center, Belgrade
- 1978 – From Labor to Creative Work, 25 min, Gallery of the Student Cultural Center, Belgrade; From Labor to Creative Work, 30 min, Gallery of Contemporary Art, Zagreb
- 1979 – From Labor to Creativity (Version II), 30 min, Gallery of the Student Cultural Center, Belgrade; Dal Lavoro alla Creatività, 25 min, Studio 16/e, Turin
- 1982 – Grande Natura Morta, 25 min, Il Festival Internazionale d'Arte Video, Locarno; From Work to Creativeness, 4th Biennial, Sydney; Vision in Disbelief, Sydney
- 1986 – Large Still Life, April Meetings, Gallery of the Student Cultural Center, Belgrade
- 1996 – Chattanooga Choo Choo and the United Belgrade Still Life, Die Weise Stadt, Museum moderner Kunst Stiftung Ludwig, Vienna
- 1997 – Record of a Portrait – Ješa Denegri, Gallery Zvono, Belgrade

== Artworks on film tape ==
The list includes:

- 1973 – The Man from the Newspaper, 8 mm, black-and-white, 3 min
- 1974 – Bandiera, Super 8 mm, colour, sound, 11 min; Per il Futuro, Super 8 mm, colour, 10 min

== Video artworks ==
The list includes:

- 1975 – Identity: The Destruction of the Books of Marx, Hegel and the Bible, black-and-white, 20 min, PAL, sound; Trigon '75, Graz
- 1976 – Daily Ritual of Coffee Drinking, 30 min, black-and-white, 3/4 in, PAL, sound; Reading the Same Text, black-and-white, 20 min, 3/4 in, PAL, sound; Reading Marx, Hegel and the Bible in the Light of Matches, black-and-white, 30 min, 3/4 in, PAL, sound; Spot in Space or Position of Individuals in Society, black-and-white, 30 min, 3/4 in, PAL, sound; Tübingen
- 1977 – Movement as a General Need, 26 min, black-and-white, 3/4 in, PAL, sound; Revolution as a Game of Minorities, 17 min, black-and-white, PAL, sound; Tübingen
- 1982 – Great Still Life, 25 min, colour, 3/4 in, PAL, sound; Locarno
- 1983 – Metaphysical Duchamp, Video D.C. 83; Ljubljana

== Publications (selection) ==
- Gillo Dorfles, Ultime Tendenze nell'Arte d'Oggi, Feltrinelli, Milan, 1973, p. 149
- Achille Bonito Oliva, Europe – America: The Different Avant-Gardes, Decco Press, Milan, 1976, p. 126
- Gillo Dorfles, La Body Art, l'Arte Moderna, Fratelli Fabbri, Milan, 1977, p. 225
- Ješa Denegri, 10 Years Autumn Styring, Paul Kaufman, Graz, 1978, p. 171
- Radomir Damnjan, Niente di Superfluo nello Spirito, Edition Dacić, Tübingen, 1978
- Rafel Tous and Giner, Metronome, Libres d'Artista / Artist's Books, Berlin and Barcelona, 1981, p. 194

== Awards ==
The awards include:

- 1963 – Award "Vanda Svevo", 7th São Paulo Art Biennial, São Paulo
- 1968 – Award, International Biennial "Danubius '68", Bratislava
- 1981 – Award, Il Festival di Arte Video, Arte Video in Europa, Locarno
- 1986 – First Award, Nadežda Petrović Memorial
- 2011 – Sava Šumanović Award, Novi Sad

== See also ==
- List of painters from Serbia
