= Jeftimije Popović =

Serbian painter

Jeftimije Popović (1792 - 1876) was a Serbian painter whose work is representative of the Neo-Classicism style of the period. He started out as a portrait painter, though later commissions for religious themes took precedence.

His works are the iconostases in Vranjevo (1834), Nadalj, Beska (1840) and the one in the village church in Grgeteg. The portraits he painted for the palace of the Patriarchate of Karlovci were lost during the turbulent times that followed.

== Biography ==
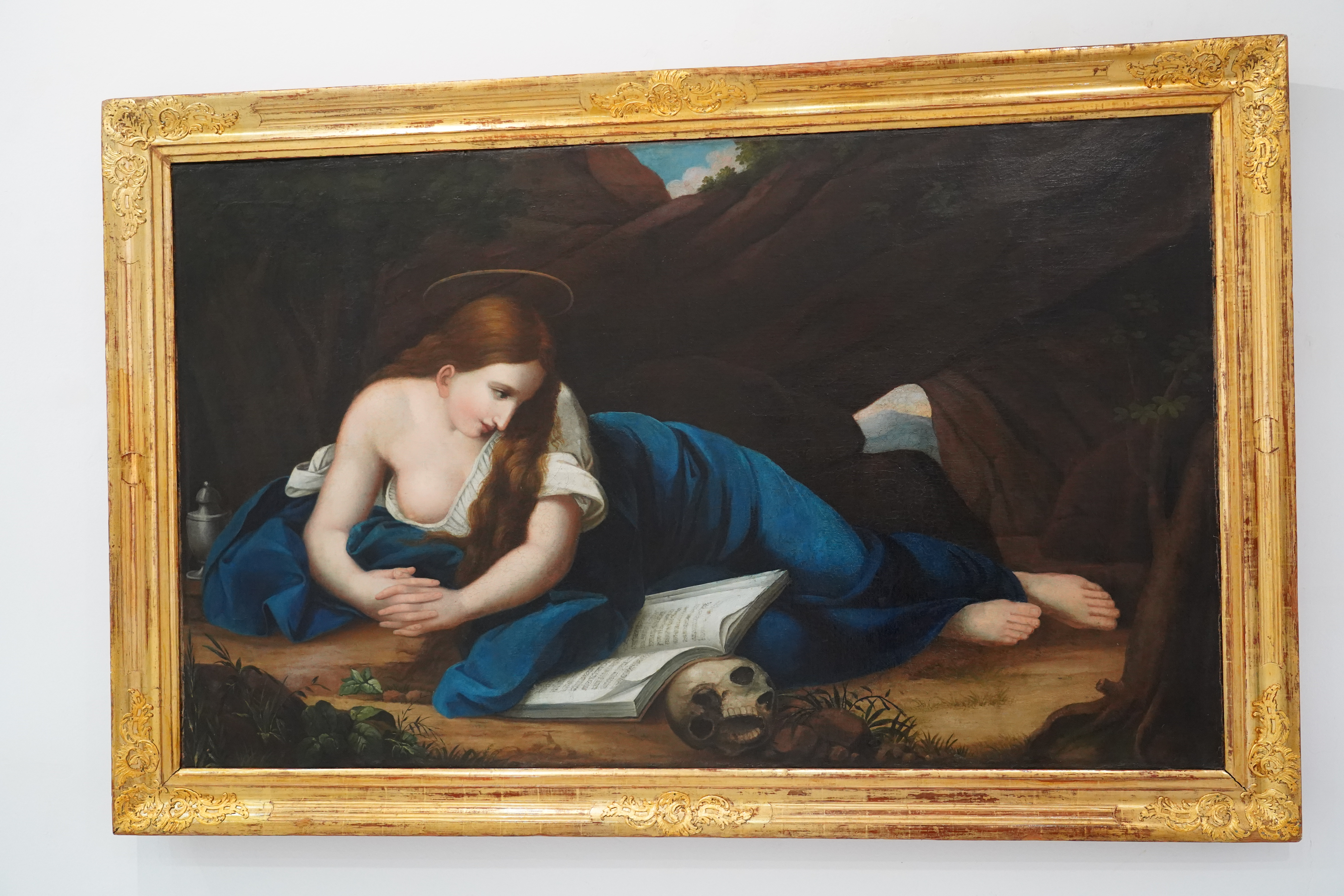
Magdalena pokajnica, c. 1820.

He was born in 1792 in Bečkerek into a family of artists. Jeftimije's father was the grandson of the master woodcarver Hadži-Ruvim and nephew of Petar Nikolajević Moler. Therefore, Jeftimije was first taught drawing and painting by his father Averkije Popović at the latter's atelier, and after his father's death in 1807, Jeftimije continued working with his paternal uncle Georgije (Popović) at the same studio. So it was until 1819 when he went to Vienna to the Academy of Fine Arts to pursue his academic training. His stay in Vienna was an extremely fruitful artistic period because it was there that he held exhibitions of his early work in 1822. Upon graduation in 1824, he planned to become Prince Miloš Obrenović's court painter, and to paint the likenesses of all the members of the princely family, but this was thwarted by the Austrian authorities in Zemun. At the beginning of 1828, he went to Zadar where he spent a year teaching students modern painting techniques completely freed of post-Byzantine, zoographic schemata.

In Zadar he was also commissioned to do some restoration work by the Serbian Orthodox Eparchy of Dalmatia on the iconostasis of the Serbian Orthodox Church of Saint Elijah. After Zadar, he returned to Bečkerek for a short period before setting off on another painting junket. After 1830 he returned to Beckerek, where, with short periods of interruption, he remained for the rest of his life. He lived in the center of Bečkerek, in Krunski Sokak (now "Dr. Zoran Kamenković" Street). During the 1830s and 1840s, his creative energy did not falter, however, after that period Jeftemije slowly fell into oblivion, and his place became occupied by another exceptionally talented painter, Konstantin Danil.

Jeftimije Popović died in Bečkerek in 1876. He was 84.

== Oeuvres ==
Jeftimije Popović painted religious themes and portraits of distinguished individuals in both Serbia and Serbian Vojvodina. His works are the icons in the iconostases found in the Serbian Orthodox Church of Saint Elijah, build in 1773, in Zadar (1828), in the Serbian Orthodox Church of Saint John the Precursor in Vranjevo (1834), Nadalj, Beška (1840) and the one in the village church in Grgeteg. The portraits he painted for the palace of the see of the Metropolitanate of Karlovci were all lost in the chaos of World War II.

== See also ==
- List of painters from Serbia
