= Radoslav Lale Milenković =

Serbian painter (1926–2014)

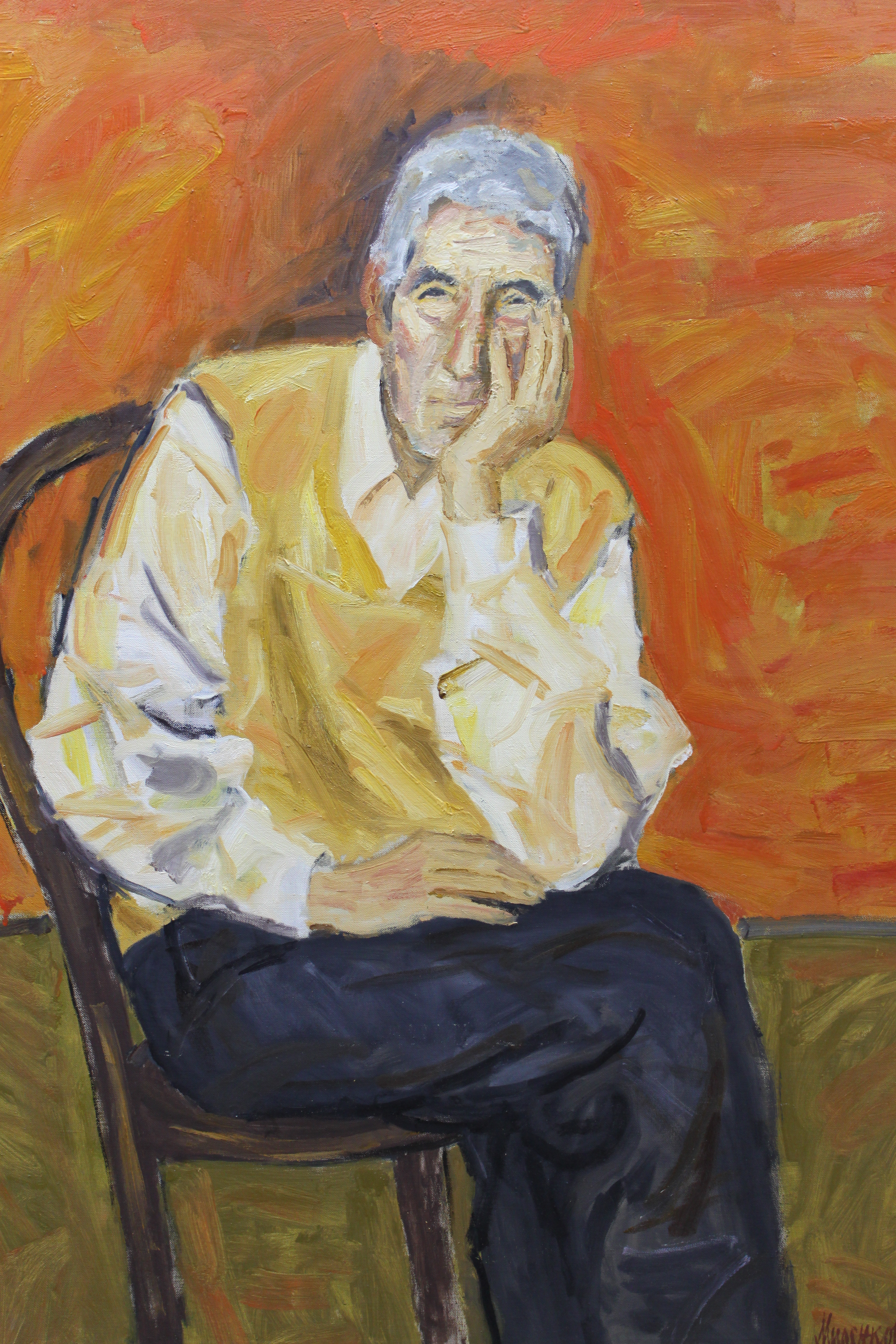
- Self-portrait of Milenković
- Born: 8 February 1926; Prokuplje, Kingdom of Serbs, Croats and Slovenes
- Died: 23 March 2014 (aged 88); Belgrade, Serbia
- Education: Academy of Fine Arts, Belgrade
- Known for: Painting
- Movement: Figurative art

Radoslav Lale Milenković (Serbian Cyrillic: Радослав Лале Миленковић; 8 February 1926 – 23 March 2014) was a Yugoslav and Serbian painter associated with figurative painting. He graduated from the Academy of Fine Arts in Belgrade in 1954 and joined the Association of Fine Artists of Serbia in the same year. His work developed within the tradition of the Belgrade School of Painting, and he remained committed to figurative art throughout his career.

Portraits, self-portraits and figure compositions occupy a central place in Milenković's oeuvre, although he also painted still lifes, landscapes and urban motifs. The human figure and face were recurring subjects, ranging from portraits of family members and friends to scenes of everyday life. He also treated historical, mythological and religious subjects, including Battle of Kosovo, Laocoön and His Sons and The Entombment. His work was characterised by assured draftsmanship, restrained tonal relationships and a freer interpretation of observed reality, while remaining rooted in the tradition of figurative painting.

== Early life and education ==
Milenković completed his primary and secondary education in his hometown of Prokuplje. In 1954, he graduated from the Academy of Fine Arts in Belgrade, where he also completed specialist studies. In the same year he became a member of the Association of Fine Artists of Serbia (ULUS) and began exhibiting with the association. From then until his death, he devoted himself exclusively to painting.

== Themes ==
From his beginnings as a painter in the early 1950s through his mature period, Milenković repeatedly worked with several established genres: portraiture, still life, landscape and urban motifs. In a 1978 interview, he argued that even subjects that had been treated countless times could yield a new artistic vision depending on the strength of an artist's talent and personality.

Milenković was shaped by the Belgrade School of Painting and, in part, by its Intimist branch. As a graduate and specialist student of Nedeljko Gvozdenović, he established early in his career the subjects to which he would repeatedly return. Art historian Nataša Radosavljević described the development of his style as gradual and relatively consistent over the course of his long career.

== Style ==
In an introductory note for his solo exhibition at the ULUS Gallery on Knez Mihailova Street, held from 8 to 21 September 1993, Milenković described himself as committed to figurative painting and said that he regarded painting as a means of expressing his personal view of the world. He argued that ordinary objects and traditional artistic subjects could still accommodate an individual contribution and that a maturely painted portrait was no less valuable than works associated with newer artistic tendencies.

Portraiture and a commitment to figuration remained constants in Milenković's work. In the catalogue for Milenković's 2011 retrospective at the Cvijeta Zuzorić Art Pavilion, art critic Petar Petrović wrote that throughout his career Milenković remained faithful to approaches to figurative painting rooted in the earliest and most characteristic examples of the interwar Belgrade School of Painting.

Art historian and critic Zdravko Vučinić characterised Milenković's portraits as recognisable without being strictly realist, noting a degree of free interpretation of visual experience. He emphasised Milenković's assured draftsmanship, strong and simple brushstrokes, restricted tonal range enlivened by stronger colour accents, and the importance of self-portraiture within his work. Vučinić also noted his depictions of harlequins and compared aspects of his portrait painting to the work of Petar Dobrović.

Milenković's pictorial approach centred on everyday human experience, particularly faces and bodies. His subjects included self-portraits, portraits of relatives and friends, bathers on beaches, grape pickers and women walking together. He also produced figurative works dealing with historical, mythological and religious subjects, including the Battle of Kosovo, Laocoön and His Sons and The Entombment. Reviewing Milenković's 1993 exhibition at the ULUS Gallery for the newspaper Borba, Pavle Milenković wrote that the works, primarily portraits and figure compositions, demonstrated a cultivated sensitivity to character and a sense for essential features rather than superficial psychologising. He also characterised Milenković's painting as modest and restrained.
