= Natalija Cvetković =

Serbian artist (1888–1928)

Natalija Cvetković (4 June 1888 - 19 April 1928) was a Serbian war artist.

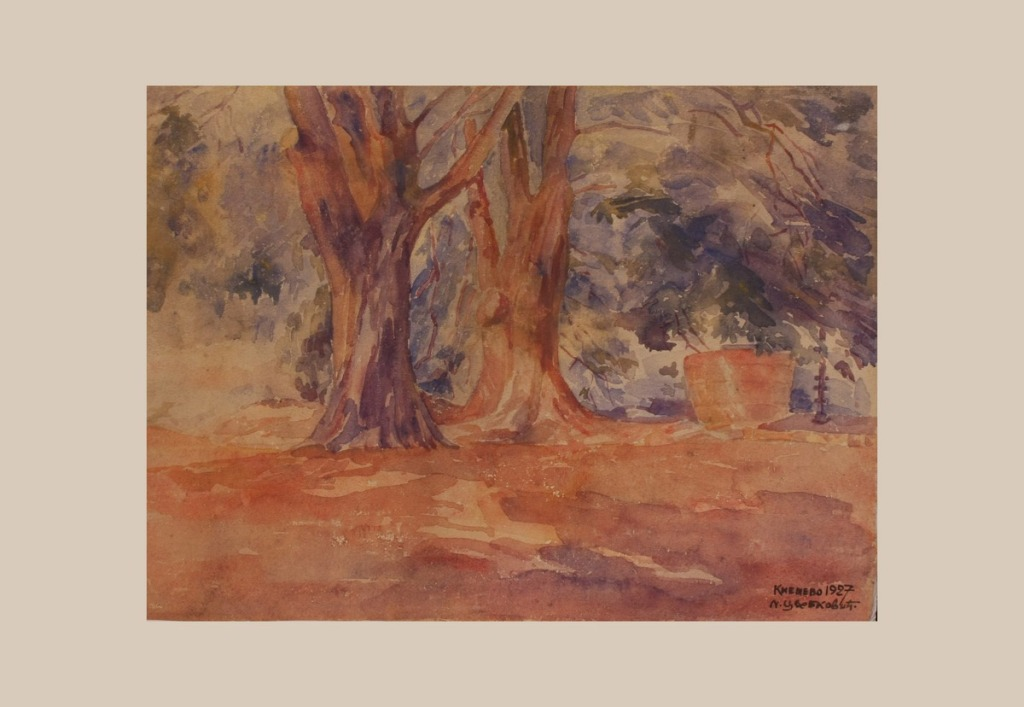
Natalija Cvetković, Dva stabla (Two trees), 1928

== Biography ==
Cvetković was born and raised in Smederevo, Kingdom of Serbia. Her family moved to Belgrade in 1900 to enable her to study art. She enrolled at the newly established Rista Vukanović Serbian Drawing and Painting School and spent five years learning art technique with Beta Vukanović and theory with Svetozar Zorić, and Branislav Petronijević. As a Fellow of the Ministry of Education, she continued her studies at Munich's Kunstgewerbeschule from 1905 to 1908 and then spent six months at the Académie Julian in Paris from the end of 1908 to mid-1909. Upon her return to Belgrade, she accepted the position of a drawing teacher at the School of Arts and Crafts (part of the Arts and Crafts movement), where she taught until the end of her life in 1928 when she died with influenza. She was one of the founders of the Association of Fine Artists in Belgrade in 1919 and a member of the Serbian Society of Artists, better known by its acronym "Lada". From 1920 to 1928 she was the society's secretary. With Nadežda Petrović and Zora Petrović, she participated in numerous exhibitions, artistic projects and art colonies in Belgrade.

During the Balkan Wars she volunteered as a nurse. Cvetković died of influenza in Belgrade, Kingdom of Yugoslavia in 1928, aged 39.

=== Painting ===
As a student of Beta Vukanović, Cvetković based her artistic beginnings on work in nature, such as French plenaries, where she worked on drawings and watercolors of landscapes in full daylight, which decisively determined her further artistic movement. During her stay in Munich, she perfected drawing and at the same time became interested in applied arts and arts and crafts. In painting, she changes by introducing a more intense color register, tailored to Munich impressionism, which remained characteristic of her later painting opus based on light and its contrasts. She was also influenced by viewing the French Impressionists at the Luxembourg Museum during her short stay in Paris. Her small impressionistic cycle of paintings, created on her return to Belgrade, is considered to be at the very top of Serbian modernism.

== Exhibitions ==
- Bath on the Sava River, 1913
- 1904 The first Yugoslav art exhibition, Belgrade
- 1910 First Serbian Art Exhibition (Third Lade Exhibition), Sombor
- 1912 Fourth Yugoslav Art Exhibition, Belgrade
- 1920 Fifth exhibition of the Serbian Artists Association "Lada", Belgrade
- 1921 Sixth Exhibition of the Serbian Artists Association "Lada", Belgrade, Exhibition of Fine Artists, Sombor
- 1922 Fifth Yugoslav Art Exhibition, Belgrade
- 1923 The seventh exhibition of the Serbian Artists Association "Lada", Sombor
- 1924 Exhibition of Belgrade painters and sculptors, Belgrade, Eighth exhibition of the Serbian Artists' Association "Lada", Belgrade
- 1926 Ninth exhibition of the Serbian Artists Association "Lada", Belgrade
- 1927 Sixth Yugoslav Art Exhibition, Novi Sad, Tenth Exhibition of the Serbian Artists Association "Lada", Zagreb
- 1928 Eleventh exhibition of the Serbian Artists' Association "Lada", Belgrade

== Posthumous exhibitions ==
- 1938 Retrospective exhibition of works by Serbian painters, Yugoslav Women's Federation, Pavilion "Cvijeta Zuzorić", Belgrade
- 1940 First exhibition of works by the Association of War Painters and Sculptors 1912–1918, Art Pavilion "Cvijeta Zuzorić", Belgrade
- 1963 Women of Serbia - Artists, Belgrade Cultural Center Gallery, Belgrade, Nadežda Petrović and the Beginnings of Modern Serbian Painting, Srem Gallery, Sremska Mitrovica, Landscape in Belgrade Painting 1900–1941, Belgrade Cultural Center Gallery, Belgrade
- 1964 War painters 1912–1918, Military Museum, Belgrade
- 1965 Memorial of the First Yugoslav Exhibition 1904, Nadezda Petrović Art Gallery, Čačak
- 1967 Plenerists and Impressionists, National Museum, Belgrade
- 1968 Portraits of the Belgraders, Gallery of the Belgrade Cultural Center, Belgrade
- 1969 Association of Fine Artists 1919, Art Pavilion, Belgrade
- 1970 Women painters between the two wars (from the collection of the National Museum in Belgrade), Sava Sumanovic Gallery of paintings, Šid
- 1971 Exhibition of paintings of six forgotten Serbian painters, Art Center of the Cultural Center, Vrbas
- 1972 Women painters, Gallery of self-taught fine artists, Svetozarevo, Watercolor in Serbian painting, Gallery of self-taught fine artists, Svetozarevo, Watercolor in recent Serbian painting from the collection of the National Museum in Belgrade, National Theater, Zemun, Impressionism from the collection of the National Museum in Belgrade, National Museum, Belgrade, Drawings of Serbian Artists from the Collection of the National Museum (1830-1930), National Museum, Belgrade
- 1972 - 1973 Beginnings of Yugoslav Modern Painting 1900–1920, Yugoslav Art of the 20th Century, Museum of Contemporary Art, Belgrade
- 1973 Painters Warriors (1912-1918), National Museum - Muselim's Residence, Valjevo
- 1974 Natalija Cvetković 1888–1928, retrospective, Museum of Contemporary Art, Belgrade
- 2017 Exhibition of Works by Painters and Photographers in the Serbian Army, on the occasion of marking the centenary of World War I - Gallery of the Serbian Academy of Sciences and Arts

== See also ==
- List of Serbian painters
- War artist
