= Vasilije Stojanović Vasa =

Serbian sculptor and painter

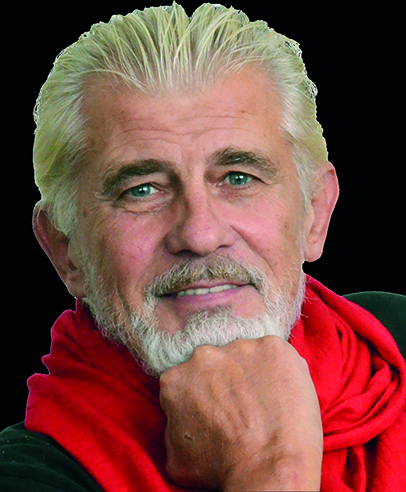
- Born: Василије Стојановић Васа; January 18, 1955 (age 71); Vršac, SR Serbia, FPR Yugoslavia
- Known for: Sculpture and painting
- Movement: Applied arts
- Website: vasanet.de

Vasilije Stojanović Vasa (Serbian Cyrillic: Василије Стојановић Васа, January 18, 1955) is a sculptor and painter from Dortmund.

== Career ==
Vasilije Stojanović, known in the art world by the nickname Vasa, was born in Vršac and has lived in Germany since 1976. He is a dental technician by education, but his creative spirit prevailed over the profession he acquired through schooling. The sculptures he created using cutlery are well-noticed at European art meetings. Its ornamentation inspired him to create gold, silver, and bronze figures.

The intentional use of only a particular color is characteristic of his works of art. He participates in numerous exhibitions worldwide: in Belgium, Luxembourg, Monaco, the United Kingdom, Germany, the United States, Japan, Qatar, and most often in Serbia and France. At the Artistes du Monde festival in Cannes in 2015, he received an award for his opus, which was presented to him by the patron of this event Marina Picasso, the granddaughter of Pablo Picasso. Then he introduced the bronze sculpture "Digital Fish," symbolizing his protest against overall digitization.

By his admission, Novak Djokovic is a great inspiration to him.

In 2024, Vasilije Stojanović Vasa was included in the Encyclopedia of the National Diaspora, edited by chronicler Ivan Kalauzović Ivanus.

== Selected awards ==
- Audience Gold Medal for the sculpture "Savior of the World" at the international exhibition Art in Miniature (Belgrade, 2014)
- Award for overall work at the festival Artistes du Monde (Cannes, 2015)
- Bronze Medal for the sculpture "Stubborn Woman" (Fernelmont, 2016)
- First Prize for the sculpture "Ireland" at the exhibition L'Art au Coeur de l'Europe (Illzach, 2017)
- Bronze Medal for the sculpture "Turkey" at the exhibition Salon National des Artistes Animaliers (Bry-sur-Marne, 2017)
- Gold Medal at the exhibition Salon contemporain Devil'Art-Dennes (Deville, 2018)
