= Nedeljko Gvozdenović =

Serbian painter (1902–1988)

Nedeljko Gvozdenović (Serbian Cyrillic: Недељко Гвозденовић; 24 February 1902 – 31 January 1988) was a Serbian painter of world renown. He is considered to be the greatest representative of the Belgrade School of Painting.

== See also ==
- List of Serbian painters
