= Ljubiša Valić =

Serbian war artist, photographer and cinematographer

Ljubiša Valić (1873 in Požarevac, Principality of Serbia – 1950 in Geneva, Switzerland) was a Serbian war artist, photographer and cinematographer.

Valić studied painting at the Academy of Fine Arts in Vienna from 1901 until 1903 and at the École des Beaux-Arts in Paris (1903–1904). He then worked as a teacher at a Serbian grammar school in Skopje from 1908 to 1909, and a press photographer for several newspapers and magazines where he published his drawings and the photographs he took in Serbia and Old Serbia during the Balkan Wars.

In 1914 he joined the Serbian Army's Drina Division and was appointed a war artist, photographer, and cinematographer at the same time as Vladimir Becić. The early war material he filmed was lost in France in 1914, but the list of titles of the topics and recorded events is preserved at the Military Museum of the Serbian Army in Belgrade. The photographs he and others took during World War I are now prized for their great historical and documentary value. Besides the war photographs, he made numerous drawings and sketches.

In August 1916 he was sent with two other photographers, Dragiša M. Stojadinović and Mihailo J. Mihailović to Rome to procure painting and sculpting material for their fellow war artists who were ensconced in Salonika before the Macedonian front breakthrough. Once there, Valić decided to desert and left Italy for Switzerland. Settled in Geneva, Valić used the drawings and sketches in his portfolio as models for his large oil-on-canvas paintings dealing with the Serbian army's arduous passage through the Prokletije in the great retreat of 1915.

In 1917, he published in Geneva two books "Interesting Moments from the War" and "The Adventures of Sargeant Miladin" (Doživljaji narednika Miladina).

== See also ==
- List of painters from Serbia
