= Ferenc Kalmar =

Serbian and Hungarian sculptor

Ferenc Kalmar Ференц Калмар
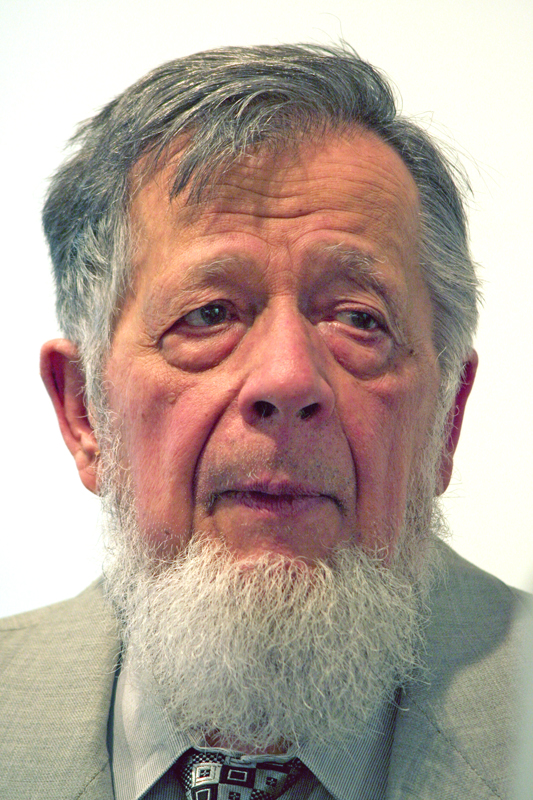
- Kalmar Ferenc
- Born: Kalmar Ferenc; May 25, 1928; Subotica, Kingdom of Yugoslavia
- Died: October 12, 2013 (aged 85); Subotica, Serbia
- Known for: Sculptor
- Movement: Outsider art, Naive art
- Website: ,

Ferenc Kalmar (1928-2013) was a Serbian and Hungarian sculptor, living in Vojvodina. He died in 2013.

== Biography ==
Ferenc Kalmar was born in Subotica (Kingdom of Yugoslavia) on 25 May 1928. He began doing sculptures in 1947. He had his first solo exhibition in Subotica in 1956. His career spanned more than six decades, punctuated by his interest in various materials: ceramics, metal, wood and frequent change of mediums. He died in his atelier in Subotica (Serbia) in 2013.

== Artistic style ==
In the early 1980s, Kalmar became associated with outsider art in Serbia through his coloured wood sculptures. Around the same time, he travelled to the United States, where he encountered Indian culture, Mayan art and Egyptian tomb reliefs. He has cited these experiences, along with witnessing Native American ritual dances, as significant influences on his subsequent work.

Kalmar's sculptural work is characterized by a combination of deep and surface incisions, creating contrasts between closed and open, sharp and rounded forms. His figures are coloured in strong, bright tones with frequent interchanges of complementary colours such as red and green, or blue and yellow. The colouring follows the development of volume, whether in complex branching forms or more restrained, stylized shapes. His work combines sculptural and pictorial elements, with textured surfaces and vivid colour giving his pieces an expressive, painterly quality.

Animals are a central subject in Kalmar's work, including birds, insects, lizards, grasshoppers, and butterflies. Birds feature prominently, particularly in his larger, brightly painted pieces. Kalmar has described his interest in the subject: "Birds are divine creatures. Man is astonished with their grace and tenderness. Monuments should be erected to these beautiful creatures because our generations may be the last who are lucky to listen to nightingales in nature."

== Exhibitions and awards ==
The numerous collection of his sculptures is at Museum of Naïve and Marginal Art (MNMA), Jagodina, Serbia. He exhibited worldwide and he was awarded several times. The most significant awards are Forum’s Prize for Art Novi Sad, Serbia, 1993) and the Award for Entire Artistic Work at the Thirteenth International Biennial of Naïve and Marginal Art, MNMA, Jagodina, 2007.

== Gallery ==
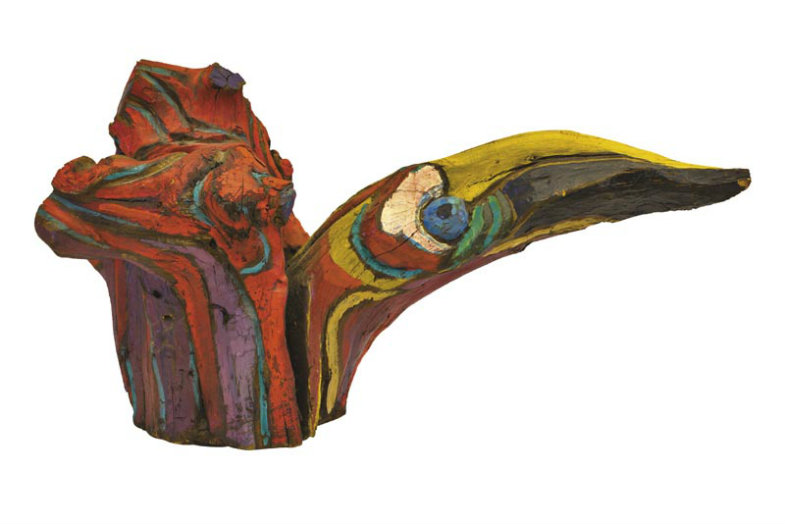
Firebird, 1996
colored wood, height 40 cm
MNMA, Jagodina

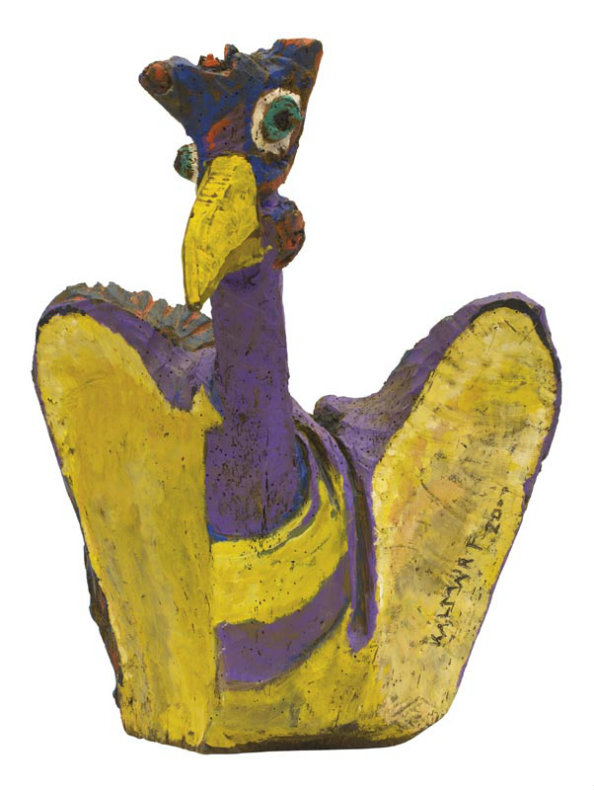
Vulture, 2000
colored wood, 70x54cm
MNMA, Jagodina

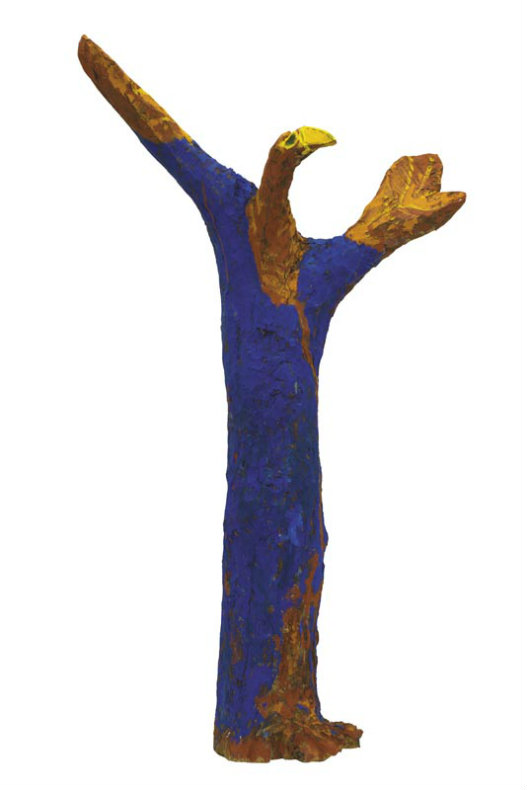
Conductor, 2009
colored wood, height 112 cm
MNMA, Jagodina

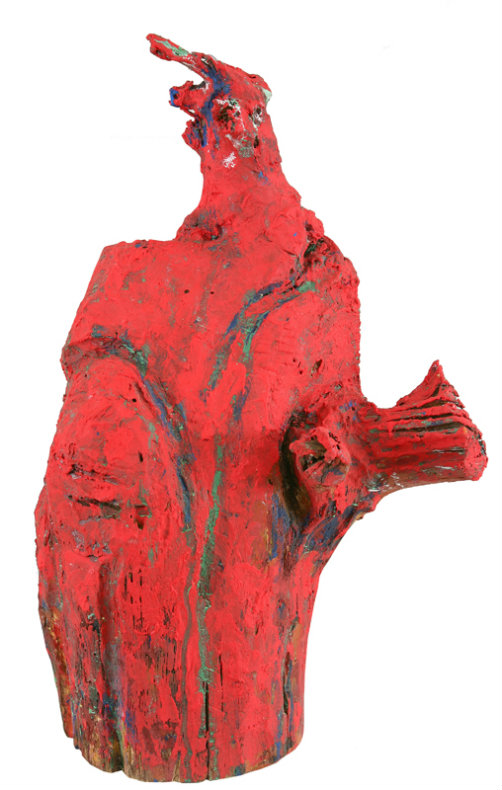
Twitch, n. a.
colored wood, height 46 cm
MNMA, Jagodina

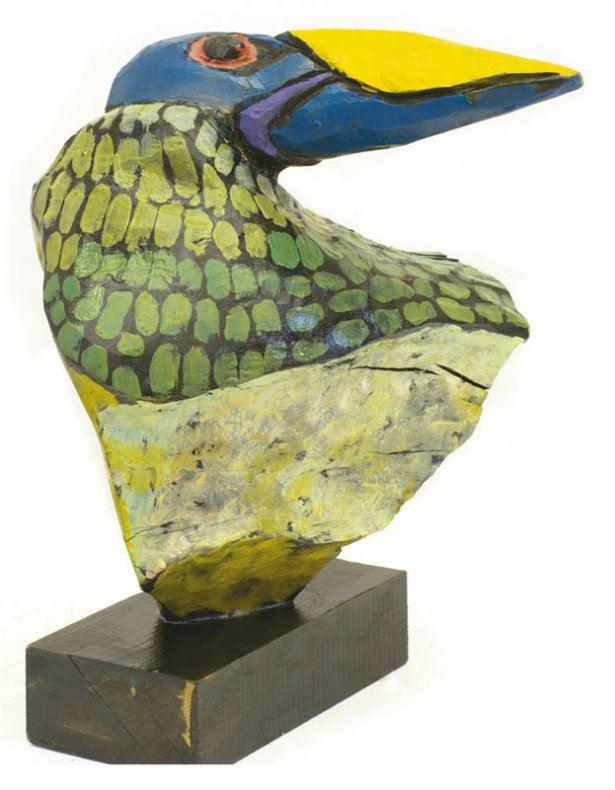
What is behind? 2002 MNMA, Jagodina

== Literature ==
- Krstić, N (2003) Naïve Art of Serbia. Belgrade: SASA - Jagodina: MNMA
- Krstić, N (2007) Naïve and Marginal Art of Serbia. Jagodina: MNMA
- Krstić, N (2013) Outsiders. Catalog. Jagodina: MNMA
- Krstić, N (2014) Outsider Art in Serbia. Jagodina: MNMA
