= Milica Bešević =

Serbian painter, illustrator, set designer (1896–1941)

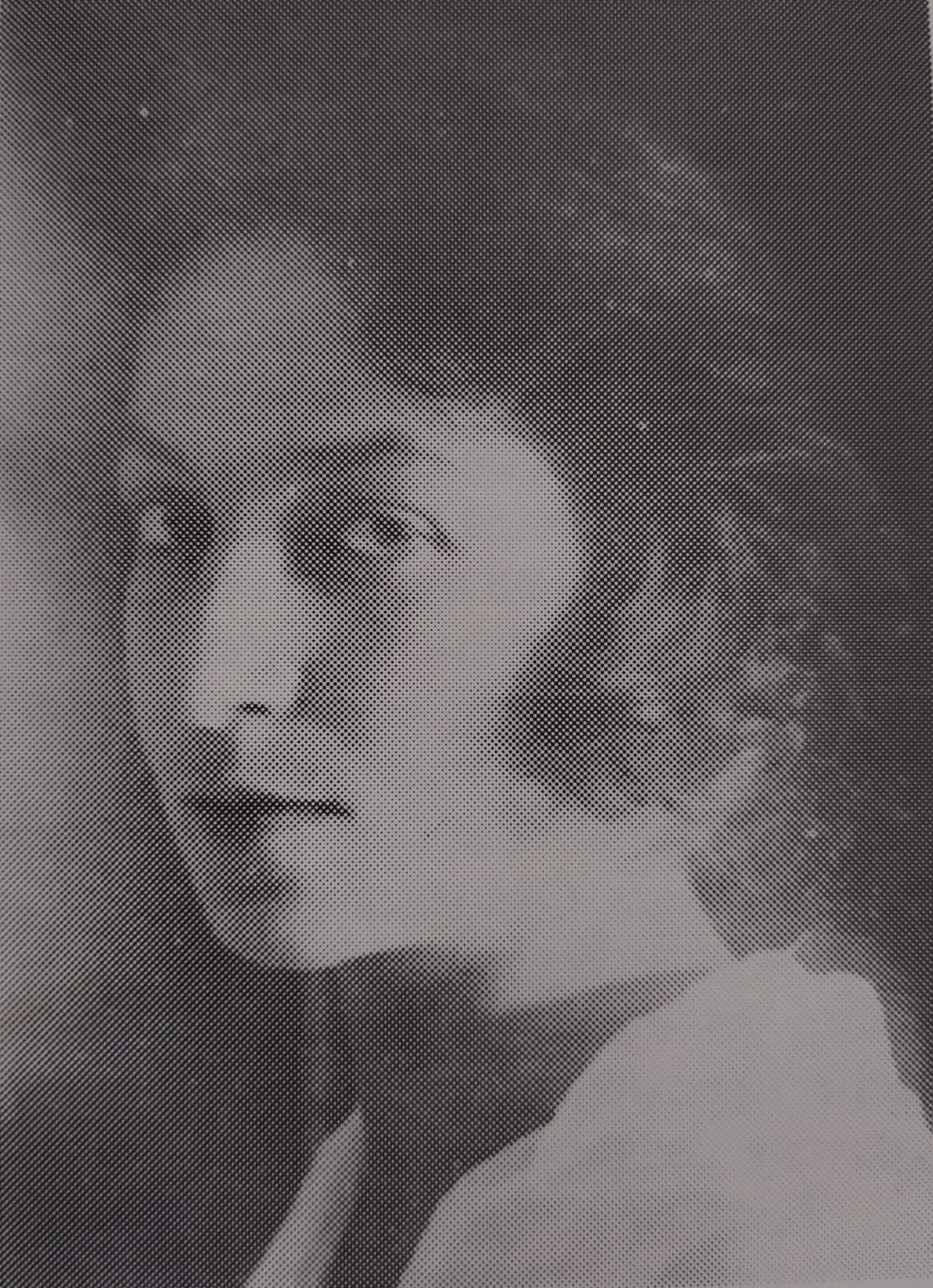
- Born: 3 February 1896; Split, Austria-Hungary
- Died: 6 April 1941 (aged 45); Belgrade, Kingdom of Yugoslavia
- Education: Zagreb School of Arts and Crafts, Belgrade School of Art
- Occupations: Painter, illustrator, set designer
- Known for: First female set designer of the National Theatre in Belgrade

Milica Bešević (1896–1941) was a Serbian painter, illustrator for the daily newspaper Politika, the first female set designer at the National Theatre in Belgrade, a conservator and a restorer of paintings at the National Museum of Serbia. She was killed when the Nazis bombed the city during World War II.

== Biography ==
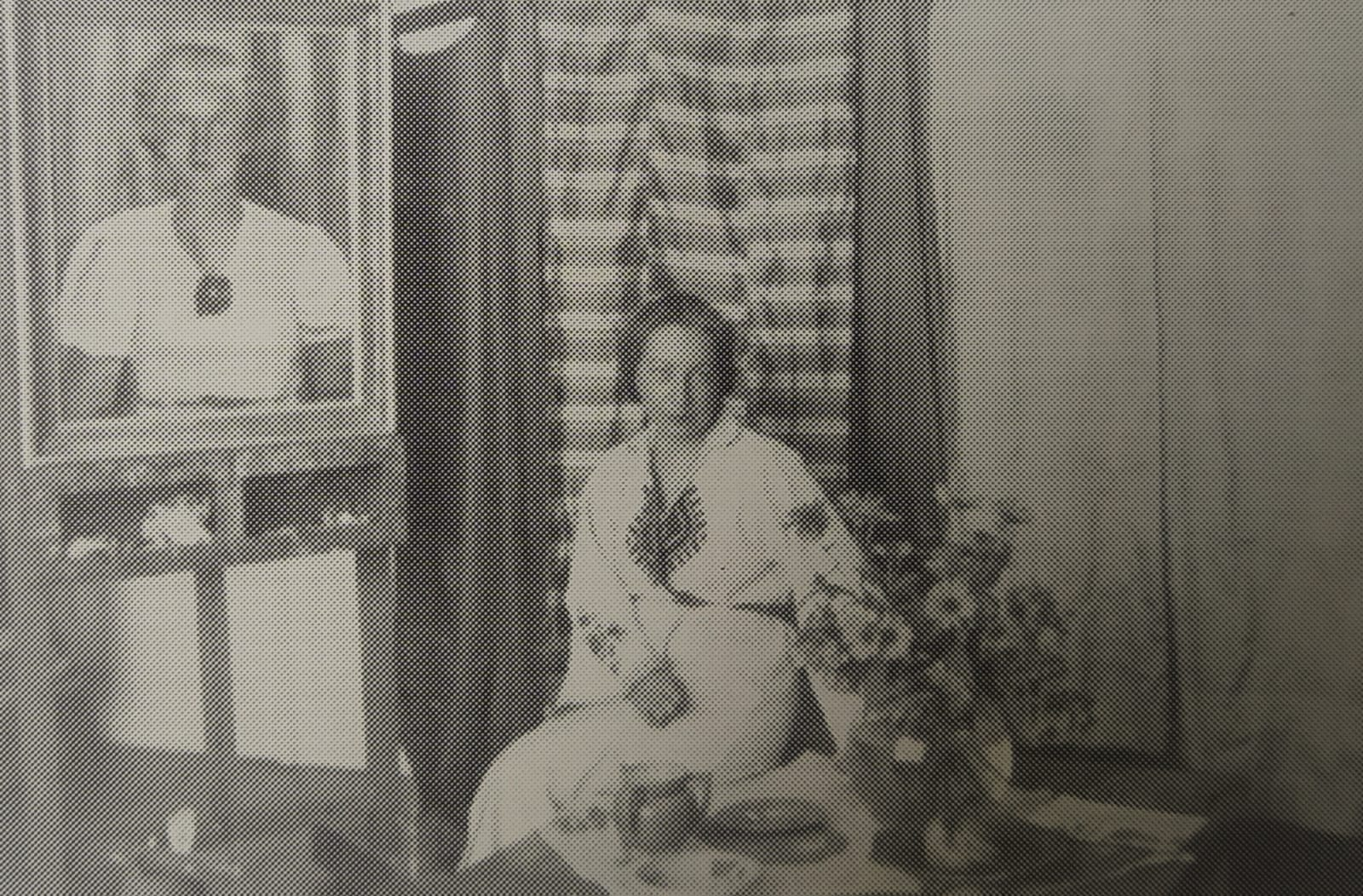
Milica Bešević in her studio.

Bešević was born in Split, Croatia, on 3 February 1896, the daughter of lawyer and journalist Stevan Bešević (1868–1942) and his wife Olga. In 1911, her father moved the entire family to live in Belgrade, Serbia. Bešević was educated by the painter Uroš Predić in his studio, where her sister Vukosava had worked as a model. After the end of World War I, Bešević graduated from the Zagreb School of Arts and Crafts and the Belgrade School of Art.

In 1926, she moved to Paris, where she studied in the studio of Vasily Shukhaev. After returning to Belgrade, she remodeled an apartment on Prizrenska Street to serve as her studio. She made her living by working at the National Museum of Serbia in Belgrade, where she was involved in the conservation and copying of medieval frescoes at the Kalenić and Morača monasteries. She also worked as the first female set designer of the National Theatre in Belgrade, and prepared illustrations for the daily newspaper Politika.

Bešević first presented her paintings in 1922 at the Yugoslav painting exhibition in Belgrade. In 1931, the first solo exhibition of her work opened in Belgrade, and in the following years, she exhibited her art in Split and Sofia, Bulgaria. She painted mainly landscapes and portraits, and for the theater, she was kept very busy as the first female set designer for the National Theatre.

== Personal life ==
She never had children. She was living in her parents' apartment when she was killed alongside her mother on 6 April 1941 on the first day of the German bombing of Belgrade . The attack, known by the German codename: Operation "The Last Judgment," destroyed the bulk of Bešević's artistic work, which was lost in the debris of her studio. Her father and sister Vukosava survived the bombs but both were seriously injured.

== Gallery ==
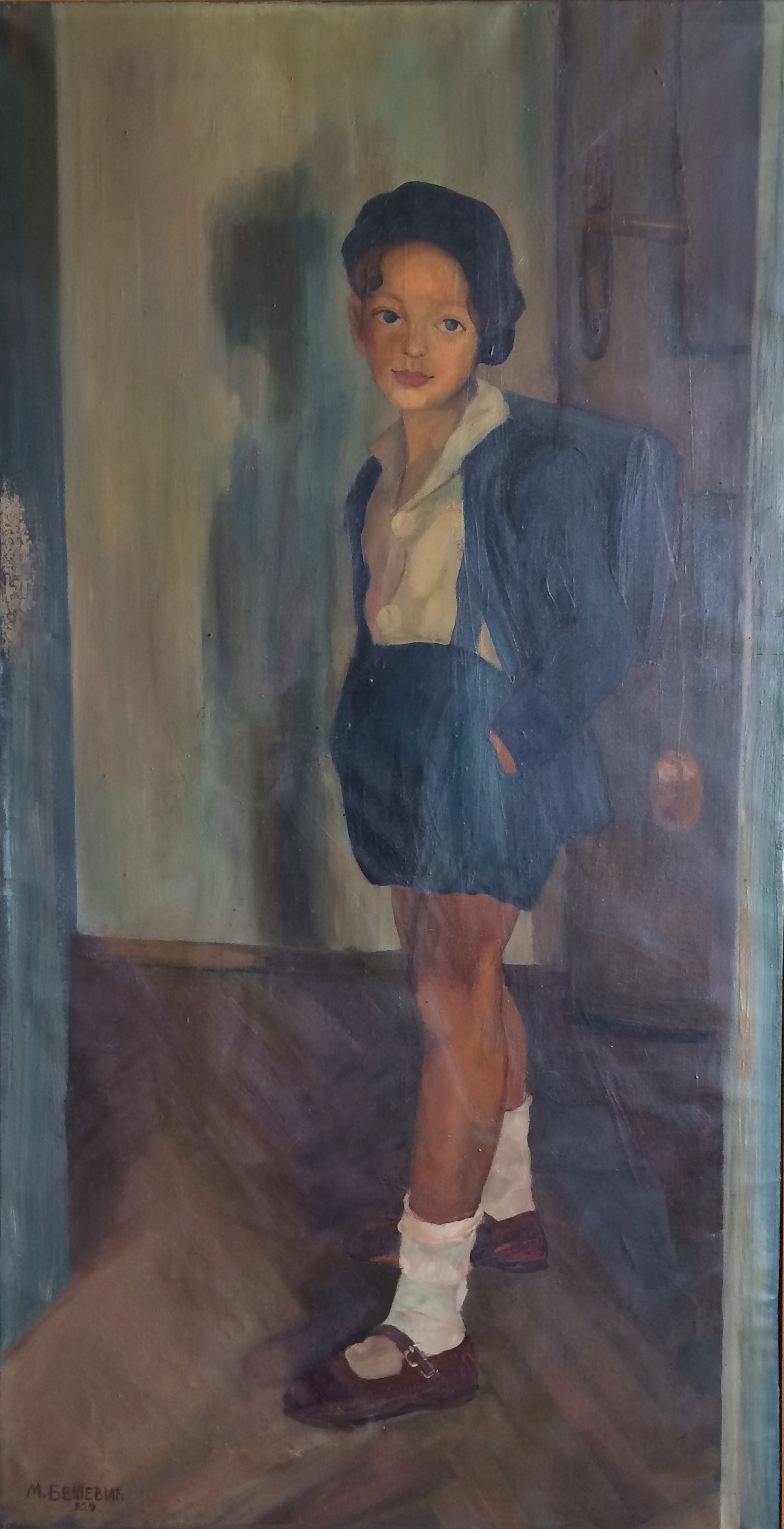
Ivo Bešević as a boy

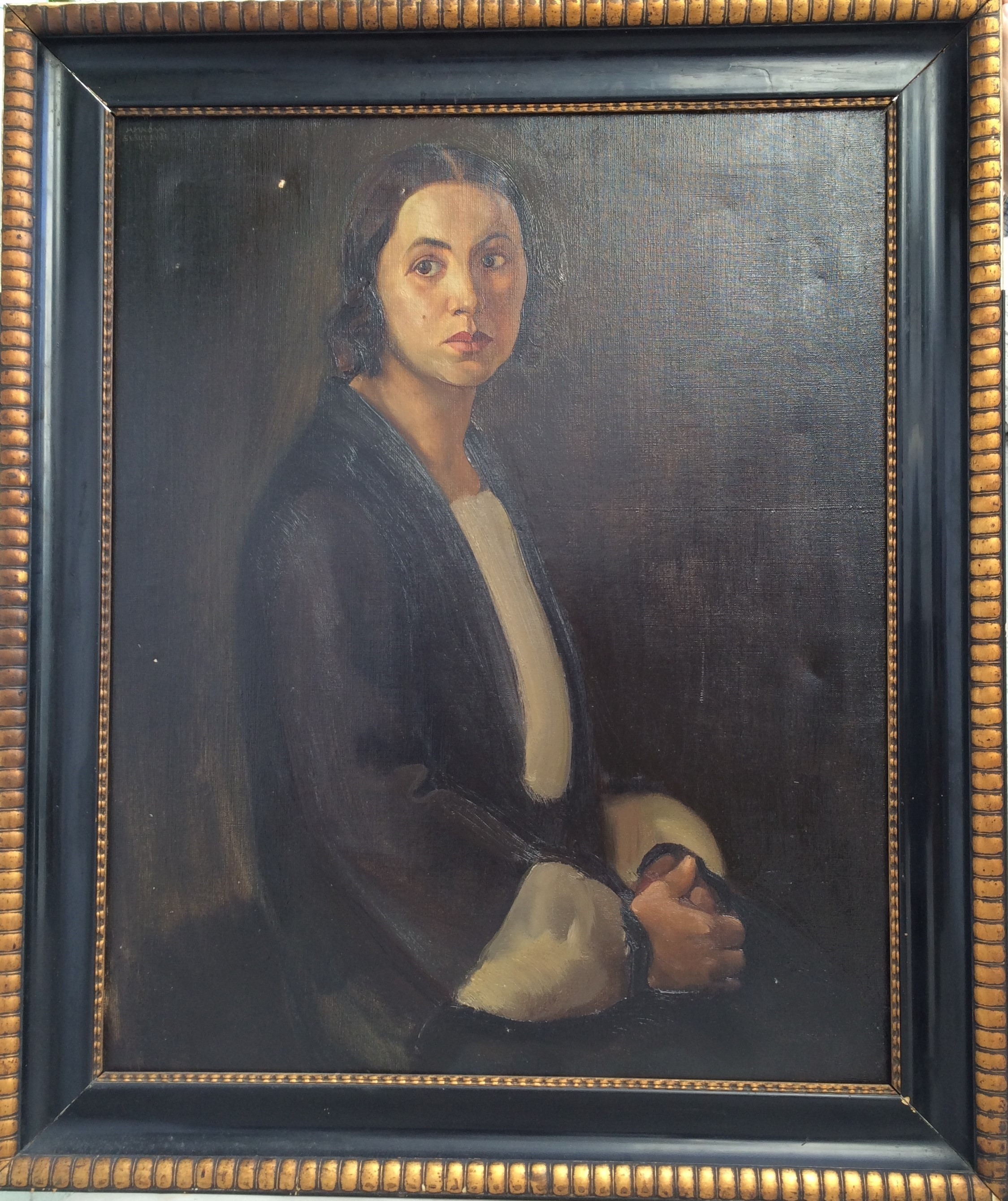
Portrait of Vukosava Bešević

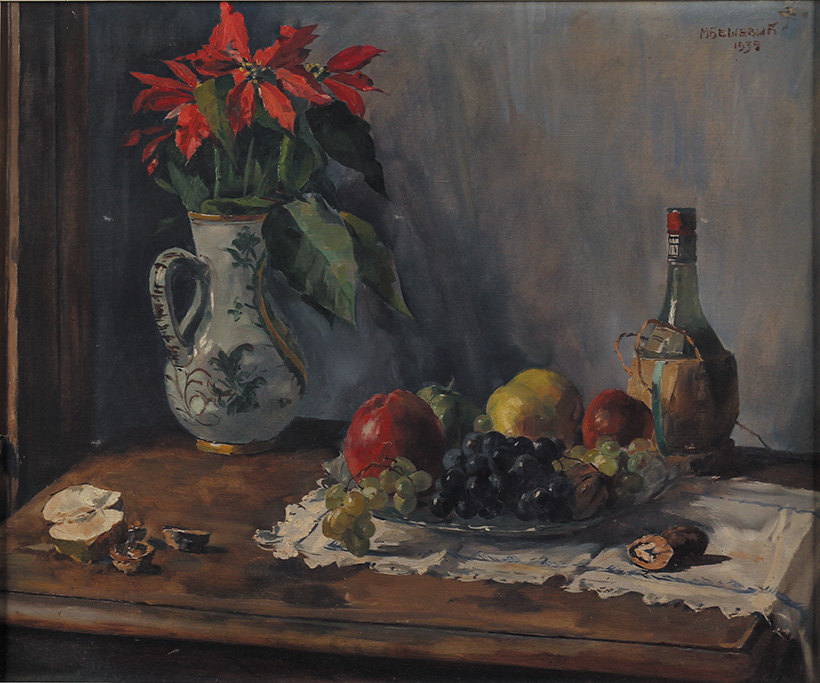
Still life
