= Vukosava Velimirović =

Serbian/Yugoslav artist

Vukosava Vuka Velimirović
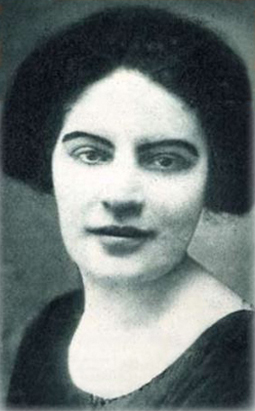
- Born: June 30, 1888; Pirot, Kingdom of Serbia
- Died: December 12, 1965 (aged 77); Belgrade, SFR Yugoslavia
- Resting place: Belgrade

Vukosava Vuka Velimirović (June 30, 1888 – December 12, 1965) was the first modern Serbian female sculptor, children's writer, illustrator, art critic and translator. She was among the most notable sculptors of 20th century, gaining international recognition between two world wars.

== Biography ==
In her early youth, Vukosava Velimirović wrote songs, fairy tales, drew cartoons for children, rules of clay shape, which became clear at that time that her life would be marked by art.

She grew up in an intellectual and patriarchal family, and she had two older brothers who studied in Moscow and St. Petersburg, the other members of the family received letters about all kinds of events and novelties in the world of sciences and arts that they were interested in.

In 1911, the whole family moved to Belgrade, where Vukosava's father Miloš was transferred. Immediately after arriving in the Serbian capital, Vukosava enrolled at the Arts and Crafts School and there began her artistic life. It is told that Vukosava's generation of students was one of the most talented, such as Zora Petrović, Jelisaveta Petrović, Nada Đukanović, Olga Golemović, Dara Mićić, Jelena Radaković and many other great artists who attended the same school.

Patriarchal Belgrade society was changing at the turn of the century, providing a window of opportunity for the "creative power of women", whose rise was recognized by philosopher Ksenija Atanasijević in her 1924 essay. At the time Vukosava Velimirović, a woman sculptor was attracting great public attention. She was educated in Belgrade, Rome, and Paris, where she spent most of her life between 1918 and 1940 in the company of some great female sculptors, including Camille Claudel. She was a sculptor known for her energetic, small bronze sculptures depicting poor war orphans. As an artist, she had strong beliefs and felt a need for artists to create politically and socially conscious works of art that reflected current events and issues. She spent much of her life working toward equal rights for Serbian women and a widespread push for equality.

Around 1924, her most famous pieces, five decorative sculptures caused a sensation when they were permanently exhibited on the facade of the Vračar Holding Bank at 1 Krunska Street. Facade sculpture was considered a masculine applied discipline, though with Velimirović's creations that notion had to be put to rest for once and for all. Velimirovič also had a successful career as a portraitist of the European upper classes.

She was married to Count Lisjen de La Martinière, with whom she broke up after three years of marriage.
