= Đorđe Jovanović =

Đorđe Jovanović may refer to:

- Đorđe Jovanović (sculptor) (1861–1963), Serbian sculptor
  - Đorđe Jovanović House, Đorđe Jovanović (sculptor) house
- Đorđe Jovanović (writer) (1909–1943), Serbian poet and literary critic
- Đorđe Jovanović (basketball) (born 1980), Serbian basketballer
- Đorđe Jovanović (footballer) (born 1999), Serbian footballer
