= Adam Stefanović =

Serbian lithographer and painter

Adam Stefanović (Serbian Cyrillic: Адам Стефановић, 27 November 1832, Perlez, Austrian Empire – 6 May 1887) was a Serbian lithographer and painter. Together with Pavle Čortanović, he authored illustrations of the Kosovo Cyclus (of Serbian epic poetry).

== Life ==
Stefanović was born in Perlez, Austrian Empire (now Serbia). He was educated at the Ludwig-Maximilians-Universität München in 1867, and then at the University of Vienna.

He was an associate of Pavle Čortanović. He lived in Pančevo in the 1870s, where he published his lithographs with Čortanović. He is deemed to have been "far better" of an illustrator than his companion.

== Work ==
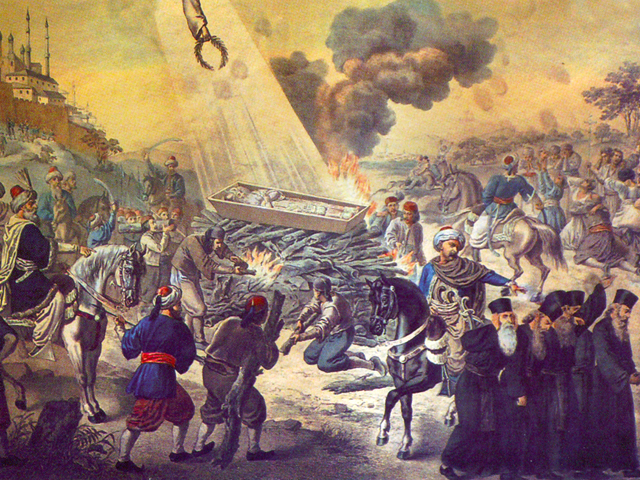
"Burning of the Relics of St. Sava", ca. 1860

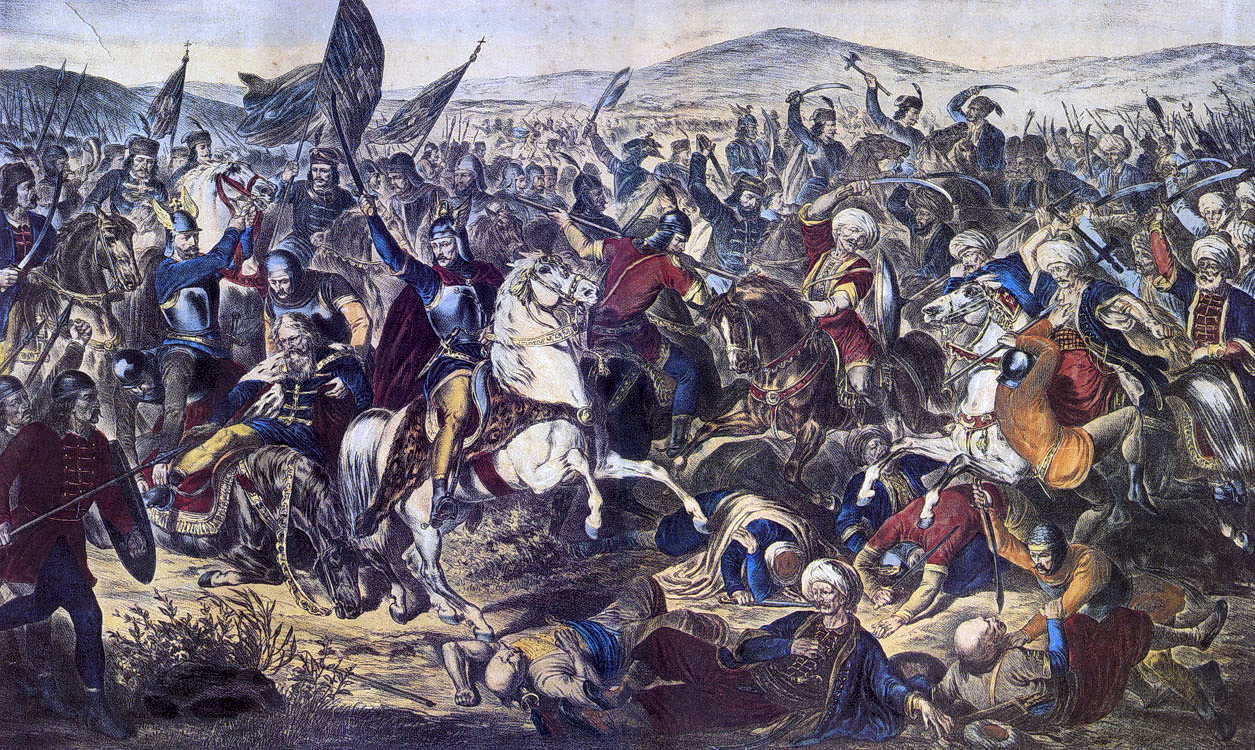
"Battle of Kosovo", 1870

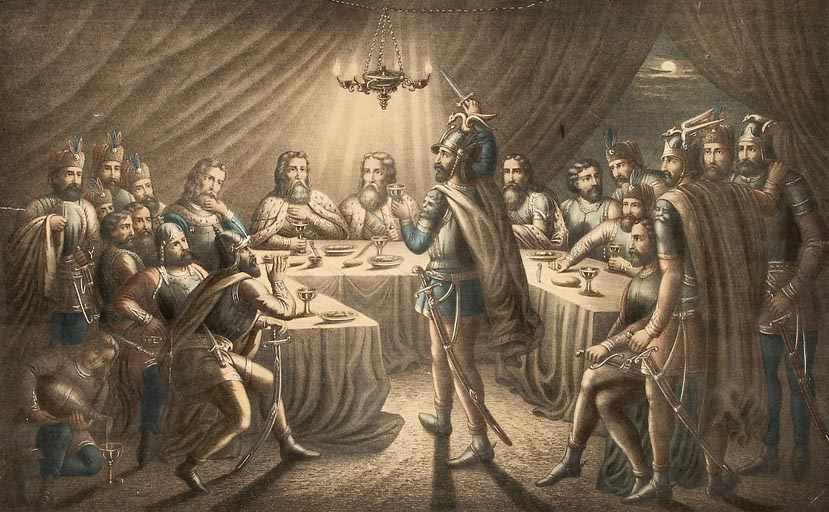
"The Prince's Supper", 1871

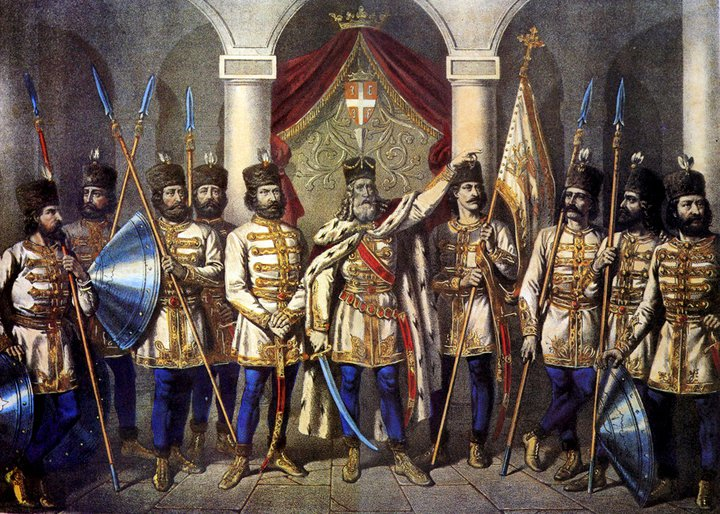
"Jug Bogdan and Sons"

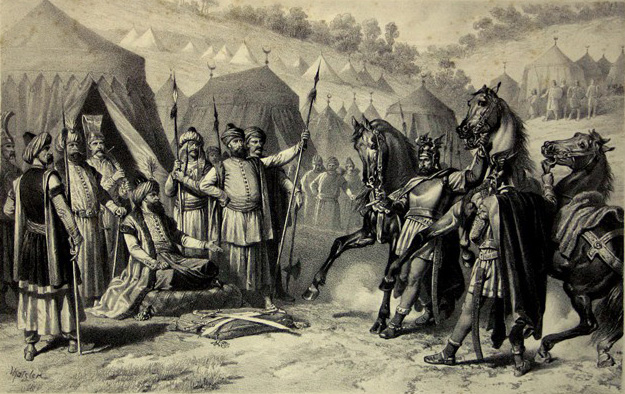
Miloš Obilić at the tent of Murad

== See also ==
- List of painters from Serbia

== Sources ==
- Matica srpska (1989). Umetnička topografija Pančeva. Matica srpska.
