= Miodrag Petrović =

Miodrag Petrović may refer to:

- Miodrag Petrović (footballer) (1946–2017), Yugoslav footballer
- Miodrag Petrović (war artist) (1888–1950), official war artist of the Serbian army during World War I
- Miodrag Petrović Čkalja (1924–2003), Serbian actor and comedian
