= Petar Čortanović =

Serbian painter

Petar Čortanović (Serbian Cyrillic: Петар Чортановић) or Čortanovački (Чортановачки, 1800–1868) was a Serbian painter. He painted the wall frescoes of the Buđanovci Church in 1838, of the Karlovčić Church in 1845. In 1856 he painted the Battle of Kosovo and members of the Lazarević dynasty.

== See also ==
- Pavle Čortanović
- List of painters from Serbia
