= Carol Szathmari =

Hungarian photographer from Romania (1812–1887)

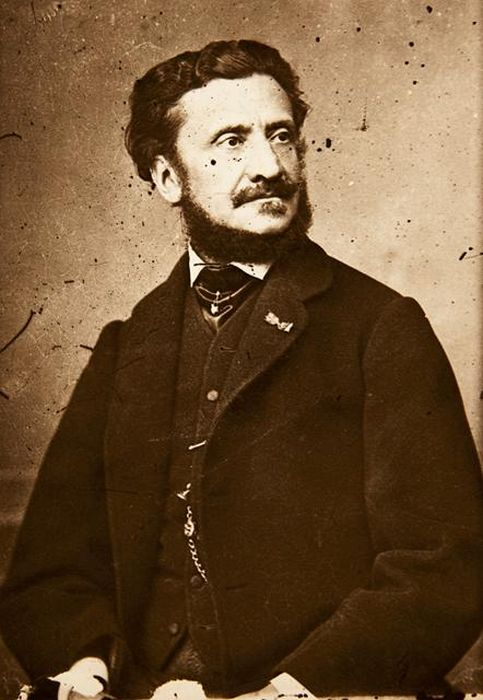
Carol Szathmari

Carol Szathmari (Romanian: Carol Popp de Szathmari, Hungarian: Szathmáry Pap Károly; 11 January 1812, Kolozsvár – 3 July 1887, Bucharest) was a Romanian painter, lithographer, and photographer of Transylvanian Hungarian origin, who was based in Bucharest from the age of 18 until his death. He is seen as the founder of Romanian photography. He is also considered the world's first combat photographer for his pictures of the battlefield taken during the first year of the Russo-Turkish war, later known as the Crimean War.

== Life ==
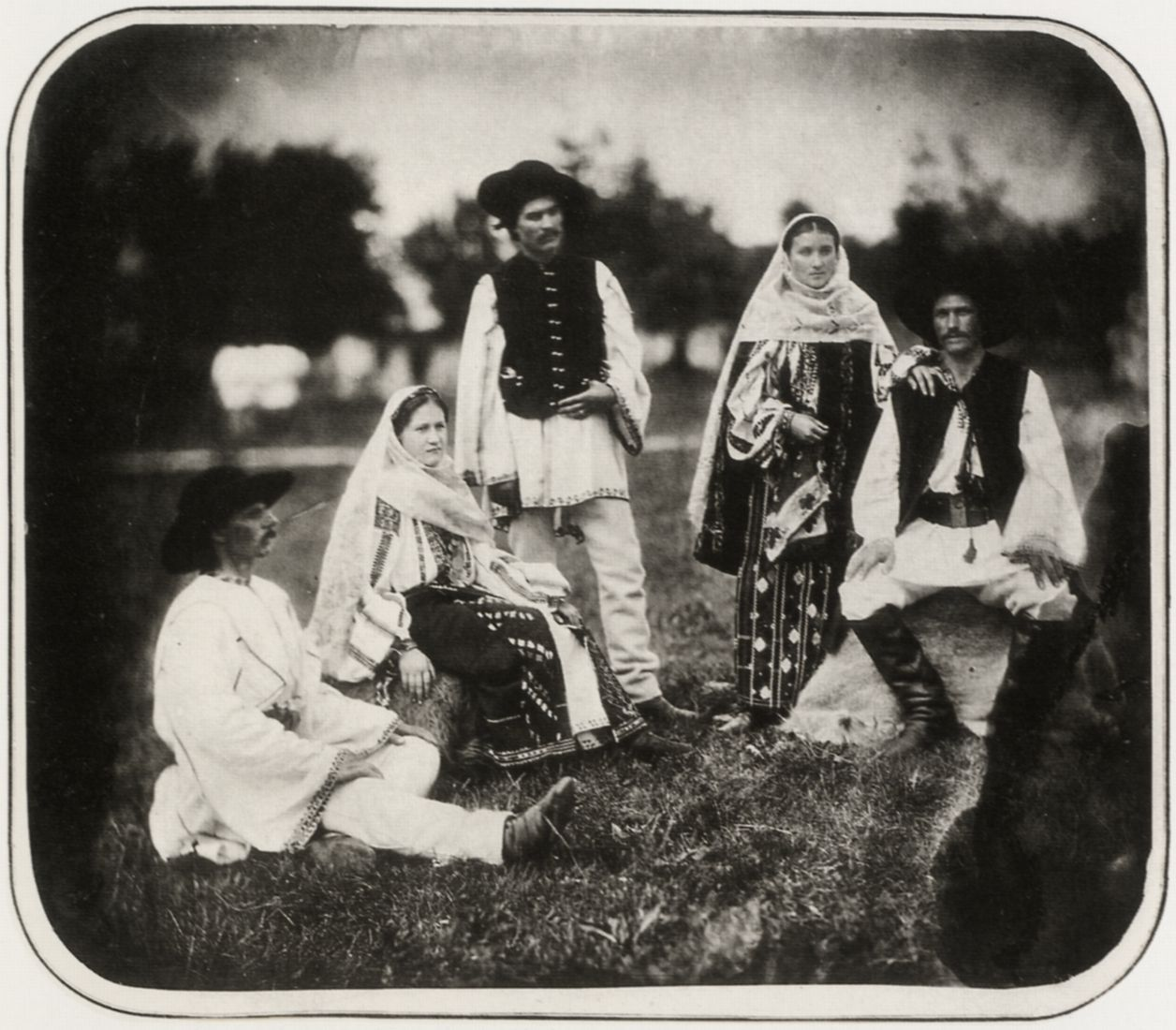
Carol Szathmari: Trachtengruppe in Câmpulung (Costumed Group in Câmpulung), 1866

Szathmari was born in the Transylvanian city of Kolozsvár, Austrian Empire (now Cluj-Napoca, Romania), in 1812. Initially, he studied law at the Reformed College in Cluj. By the age of eighteen he had moved to Bucharest. He studied painting from 1832 to 1834 in Rome, and on returning to Bucharest he was frequently commissioned to create paintings for the Wallachian boyars. He would later go on to achieve notoriety as the official artist of the Romanian royal court. He spent most of his life in Bucharest, where he died in 1887.

== Career ==
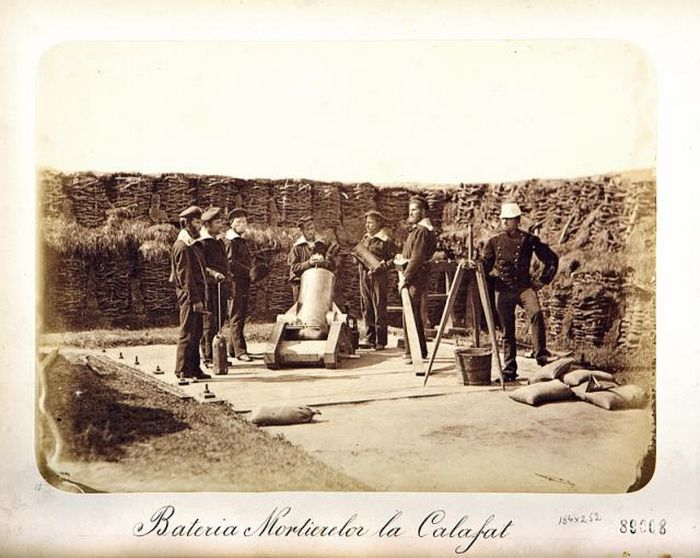
Carol Szathmari: Bateria Mortierelor la Calafat (Calafat Mortar Battery), circa 1877

In 1848 Szathmari took his first photograph, using the talbotype process, of a cupid statue that had two broken arms. By 1850 he had mastered enough of the photographic process to open a commercial photographic studio in Bucharest.

Among his clients for portraits at his Bucharest studio were high-level Russian and Turkish military officers. These connections allowed him access to the military camps of both sides at Wallachia, of the battle that would become known as the Crimean War. In 1853, using a wagon specially equipped with a dark room for processing glass plates with wet collodion, he went to the Danube river's banks and various other places, landscapes, fortifications and battlefields, where he photographed various troops, both Turkish and Russian, their equipment and their commanding officers.

Szathmari exhibited his photos, bound in an album, at the Exposition Universelle of 1855. For his work presented at the exhibition, he received the second class medal.

In July of the same year, he presented copies of his work to Queen Victoria during a private meeting at Osborne Castle, Isle of Wight, and she awarded him a gold medal in recognition of his work.

He also met privately in 1855 with Emperor Napoleon III, with an article in Lumière, the French Photographic Society publication describing the meeting:

"M. de Szathmari, the skilled photographer from Bucharest, whose arrival we already announced, had the honour to be received by the Emperor on Wednesday evening. His Majesty wanted to see all the pictures bound in his magnificent album; he was quite interested by the Russian and Turkish generals’ portraits. As an eye-witness of so many events connected with the Oriental War, and being on close terms with most of those who distinguished themselves in that great fight, Mr. de Szathmari was able to give interesting details to His Majesty. While accepting his homage, the Emperor congratulated the author of this interesting collection."

The same year, he presented two 95 page albums of his photographs to Franz Josef I.

In February 1860, he was commissioned to produce a lithograph of a map of Wallachia, based on the first detailed geographic survey of the area that had been done by Austrians during the Crimean war.

In 1863, Szathmari was given the title of Ruling Prince’s Court Painter and Photographer by the Romanian ruler Alexandru Ioan Cuza and of the first King of Romania, Carol I.

In 2012, the Cotroceni National Museum in Bucharest staged a retrospective exhibition of 400 of his paintings and photographs, in celebration of the 200th anniversary of his birth.

== Collections ==
Three of Szathmari's photographs are included in the collection of the International Museum of Photography and Film at George Eastman House, in Rochester, New York: "The Russian lancer's encampment in Craiova", "The Bombardment of Silistra" and the portrait of Lt. General F. I. Soymonov, commander of the 104th Russian Division, killed at the Battle of Inkerman.

The Royal Collection in London, England holds an album of photographs that Szathmari personally presented to Queen Victoria around 1855.

The National Library of Romania holds many of Szathmari's photographs, including his commercial portraiture work, under a collection titled Carol Pop de Szathmari photographs.

Also, Szathmari's work can be found in the collection of Milan Jovanović Stojimirović who bequeathed his vast collection of paintings and artifacts to the Art Department of the Museum in Smederevo.

== Gallery ==
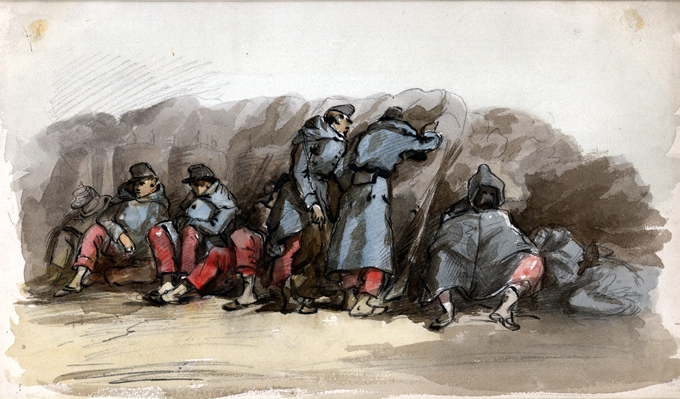
French soldiers in bivouac, 1854 painted during the Crimean War

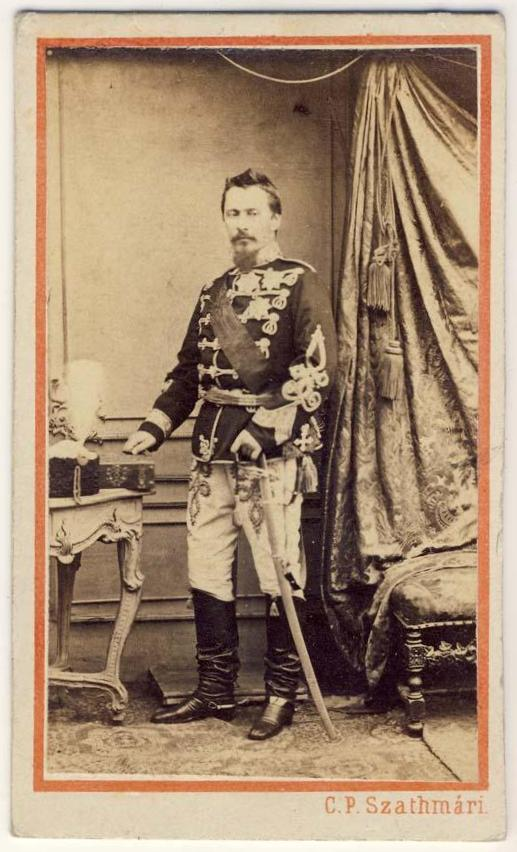
Alexandru Ioan Cuza

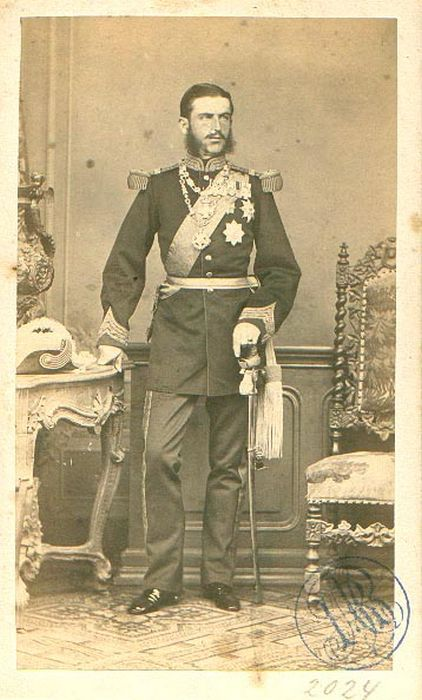
Carol I of Romania

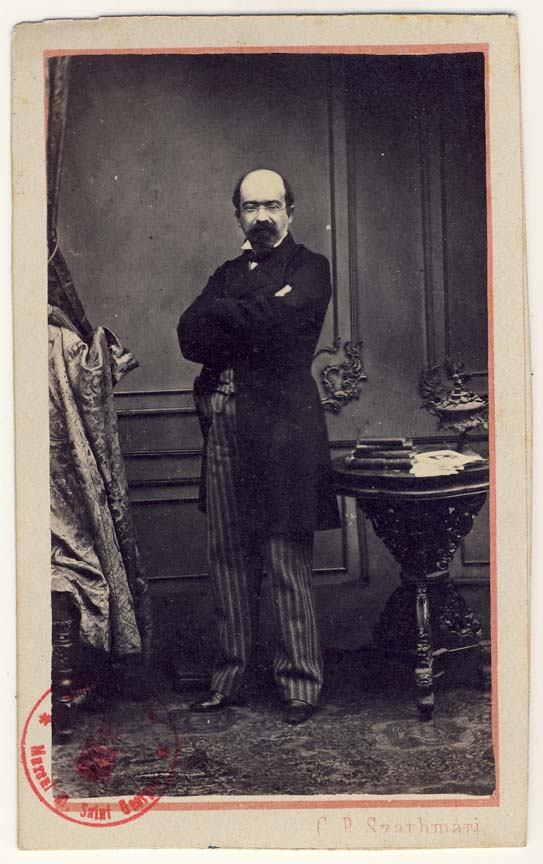
Mihail Kogălniceanu

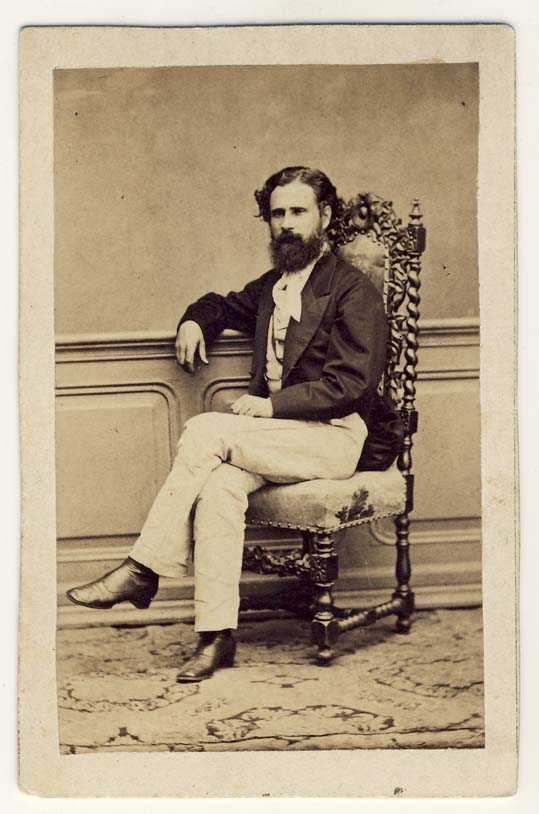
I.C. Brătianu

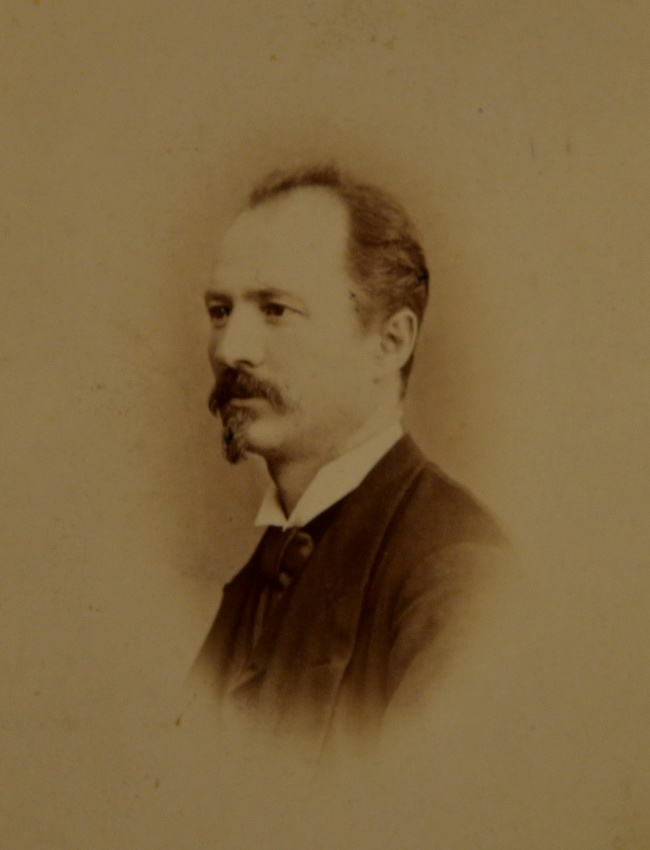
Nicolae Grigorescu

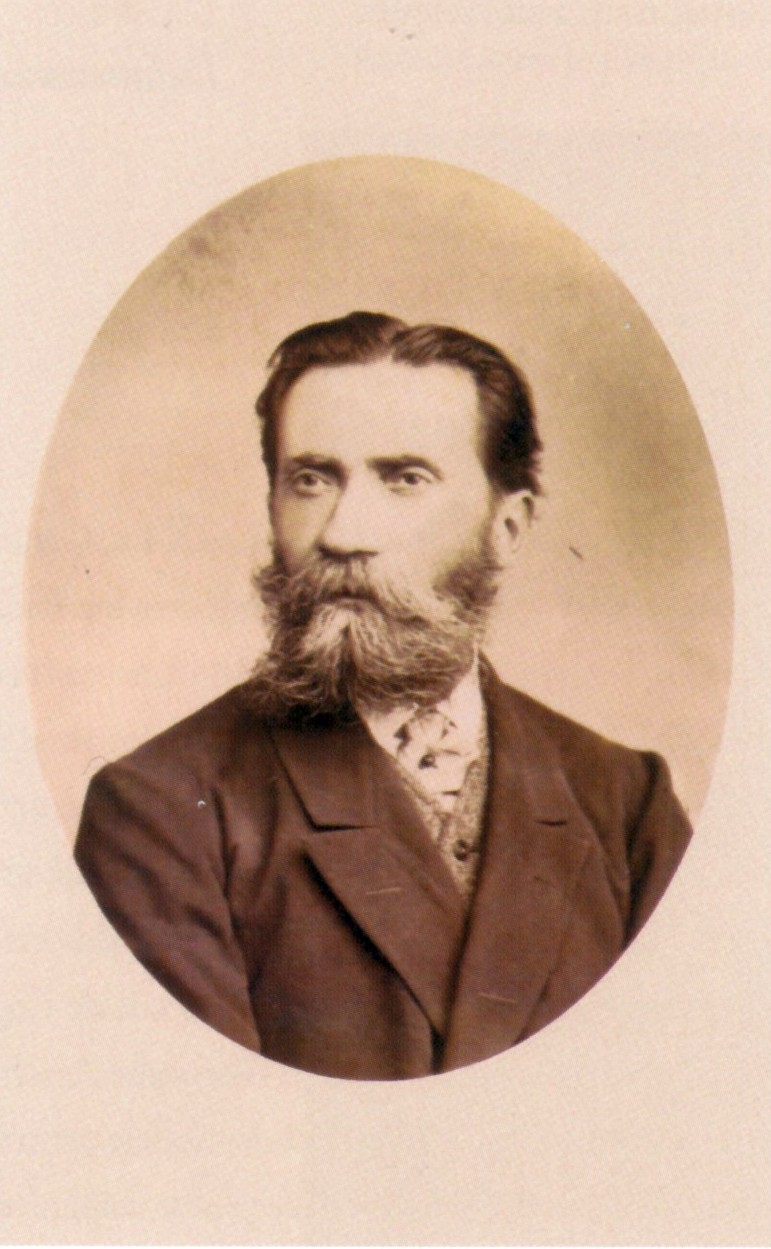
Gheorghe Tattarescu

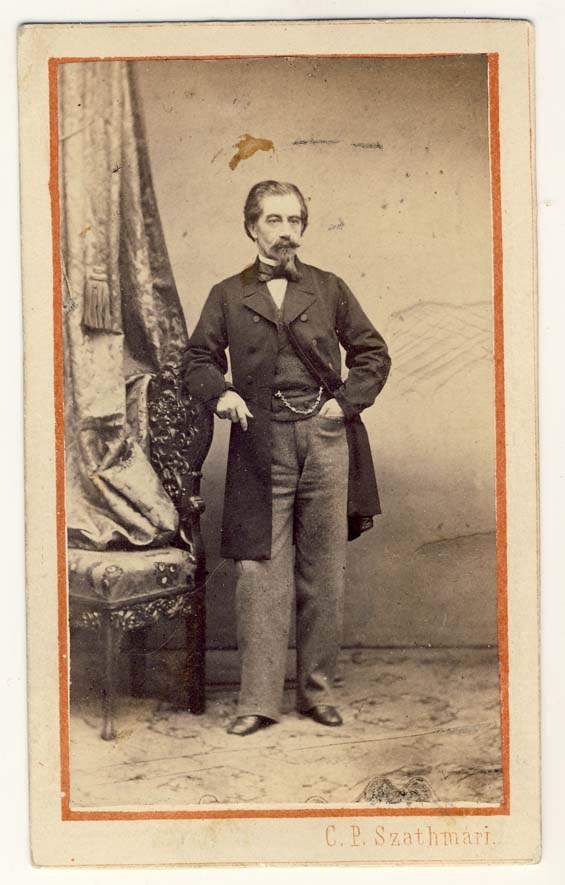
Ștefan Golescu

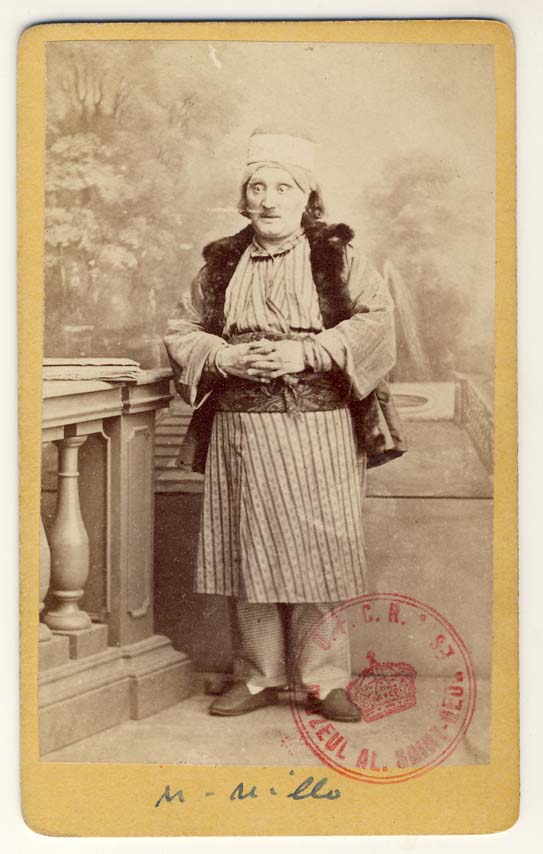
Matei Millo

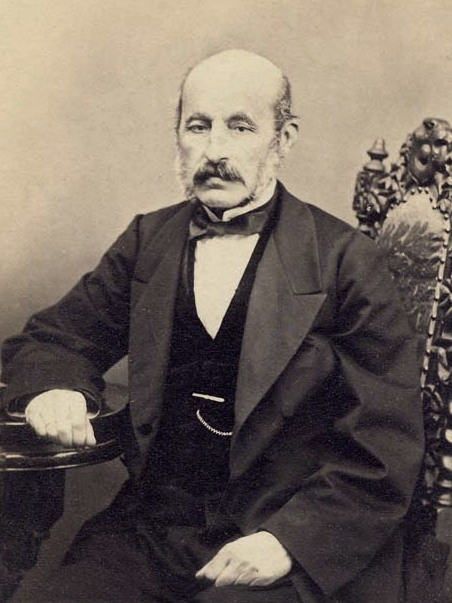
Petrache Poenaru
