= Milan Jovanović Stojimirović =

Serbian journalist and diplomat (1898-1966)

Milan Jovanović Stojimirović (Smederevo, Kingdom of Serbia, 19 June 1898 – Belgrad, Serbia, Yugoslavia, 6 March 1966) was a Serbian journalist, diplomat, manager of the Archive of Serbia, and chronicler of Old Belgrade. His vast collection of paintings, sculptures and artifacts were bequeathed to the Museum and National Library in Smederevo.

== Childhood and youth ==
He was born in Smederevo to father Svetozar Jovanović, a shoemaker, and mother Jelena nee Stojimirović. He lost his father early, so his mother Jelena and uncle Dr. Dušan Stojimirović (1870–1956) took care of him and his younger brother Ivan. Out of gratitude, both brothers added Stojimirović to their surname.

He finished elementary school in Smederevo and high school in Smederevo and Belgrade. During the First World War, he stayed in Belgrade with his uncle, Dr. Dušan Stojimirović, who was the manager of the mental hospital. There he met Petar Kočić and wrote an article about it published in 1922 in the Serbian Literary Gazette. He studied in Belgrade and Bern and graduated from the Faculty of Law of the University of Belgrade in 1927.

== Work ==
He edited the magazines Smederevski zurnal, Revi (only one issue was published), Samouprava and in Skopje the magazines Vardar and Glas Juga. He started the newspaper Vardar in 1932 and was its head until mid-December 1935 when Milan Stojadinović appointed him editor-in-chief of the renewed party body Samouprava. He was also a journalist for "Politika" for a while. During his studies in Switzerland, he was appointed correspondent of the Press Department of the Ministry of Foreign Affairs at the Embassy in Bern. He was in this position from November 1923 to June 1926. Due to the conflict with Member of Parliament Milutin Jovanović, he left that post. He was then appointed journalist of the Press Department of the Ministry of Foreign Affairs in Belgrade, in August 1926, and he performed that job until December 1928. He was then transferred as a correspondent for the Press Department at the Embassy in Berlin. The following year, he was transferred as the correspondent of the Central Presbytery of the Presidency of the Council of Ministers. He remained in that position until 1931 when he was again transferred as the correspondent of the Central Presbytery in Skopje. He was the director of the Avala News Agency from 1937 to 1938. He was an MP of the ruling coalition, elected in 1938 in Smederevo on the list of the Yugoslav Radical Party. Together with Miloš Zečević, he edited the "Monument of Nikola Pašić". He was a diplomat and participated in several diplomatic delegations, he was a press attaché at the embassy in Berlin.

He was fluent in French and German and knew English, Italian and Russian. He was awarded the silver medal of the Red Cross of Yugoslavia, the Yugoslav Crown of the 3rd Order, the Order of Saint Sava of the 3rd Order, the Romanian Crown of the 3rd Order, the Order of the Phoenix of the 2nd Order, the Italian Crown of the 3rd Order, the Order of the White Lion of the 3rd Order.

In the period from 1941 to 1944, he was the manager of the Archives of Serbia.

== After World War II ==
After the Second World War, in 1946, he was declared an enemy of the people and almost all his property in Belgrade and Smederevo was confiscated. He was sentenced to fifteen years in prison. After seven and a half years in prison, he was released from prison in Sremska Mitrovica.

He translated from English the novels "I, Claudia" by Robert Graves and "Tower" by William Harrison Ensworth, were published in Matica Srpska in 1956 and 1955. He collaborated on data collection for the Yugoslav Encyclopedic Institute in Zagreb. In the period from 1957 to 1965, he published articles in magazines under the general title "Silhouettes of Old Belgrade", in which he mainly dealt with the presentation of people and events from the 19th and the first decades of the 20th century. These texts were collected and published in the form of the book "Silhouettes of Old Belgrade" in 1971, 1987 and the third supplemented edition of "Prosveta", Belgrade, 2008. COBISS.SR 147506444.

== Death and legacy ==
He married twice and had no children. He died in 1966 in Belgrade and was buried in the Novo Groblje (New Cemetery), plot number 9.

In his house in Smederevo, he collected rare books, paintings, icons and other artistic values. This house housed the Museum in Smederevo from 1959 to 1972. In his will from 1964, he bequeathed to the Museum in Smederevo his artistic legacy of 34 objects.

Matica Srpska received the manuscript legacy and correspondence, and several thousand books from the Library in Smederevo. His portrait, painted by Lazar Licenoski, served as a decoration for the play Gospoda Glembayevi at the Smederevo Theater.

From his manuscript legacy was published: "Portraits according to living models" in 1998 COBISS.SR 132151559, "Dnevnik 1936-1941" in 2000 COBISS.SR 91900428, "Lanče Smederevac" in 2006 COBISS.SR 133327116, "Dry fountain" "2009 COBISS.SR 168313100," Balkans to Balkans and other stories "2010 COBISS.SR 176535308

In his memory, the Museum in Smederevo organized the exhibition "Legacy of Milan Jovanović Stojimirović" during April and May 2011. The collected works included Serbian painters and sculptors (Vlaho Bukovac, Ljubomir Ivanović, Miodrag Petrović, Andrey Timiović, Đorđe Jovanović, Periša Milić, Anton Huter, Stevan Todorović, Pavle Čortanović) and several foreign artists (Carol Szathmari, Ladislav Eugen Petrovits, Paolo Vietti-Violi, Gabriel von Max, Vinzenz Katzler (1825-1882), Alois Strobl von Liptoujvar (1856–1926), Louis Zwicki (1859-1906), Nicu Enea (1897-1960), Antonio Carbonati (1893-1956), Jaroslav Kartina (1893-1974), Jozef Arpad Koppay (1859-1927), Erica von Kager (1890-1975), Franta Maly (1900-1980), Boris Šapovalov).
