= Ladislav Eugen Petrovits =

Austrian painter and illustrator

Ladislav Eugen Petrovits (Vienna, Austria, 21 January 1839 - Vienna, Austria, 1 April 1907) was an Austrian painter and illustrator of Serbian and Czech origin. He was the son of the Serbian neo-classicist sculptor Dimitrije Petrović (1799-1852). Although his family wanted Ladislav to devote himself to sculpture, he himself was against and, under the influence of theatre painter Carlo Brioschi, became a painter instead. In 1857–1861 he studied at the Academy of Fine Arts in Vienna with Franz Steinfeld and Albert Zimmermann.

He was a member of the Club of Watercolor Artists at the Vienna Fine Artists Society. Illustrated a number of books; his works were published in Illustrierte Zeitung and L'Illustration. Since 1859 he participated in various exhibitions focused on painting the city and the landscape. At the request of the city of Olomouc he painted a three-meter panoramic picture of the city before its leadership decided to demolish the Theresian walls at the very end of the 19th century. Some of his paintings documented life in Olomouc at the same time and were used in the book Olomouc in 1894.

In his paintings, he also captured a number of other cities in Austria and Italy.

Today his work can be found in most art galleries and museums in Austria and elsewhere. Also, Ladislav Eugen Petrovits work can be found in the collection of Milan Jovanović Stojimirović who bequeathed a large number of paintings, sketches, and artifacts to the Art Department of the Museum in Smederevo, Serbia.

Selected works
Weißenkirchen in der Wachau, 1901

Scuola Grande di San Marco, 1900

Radmer, 1896
