= Miodrag Petrović (war artist) =

Serbian war artist during World War I

- Born: 12 September 1888; Dubravica, Kingdom of Serbia
- Died: 10 February 1950 (aged 61); Belgrade, Yugoslavia

Miodrag Petrović (Dubravica, near Požarevac, Kingdom of Serbia, 12 September 1888 - Belgrade, Yugoslavia, 10 February 1950) was one of the official war artists of the Serbian army during World War I.

Miodrag Petrović graduated from the First Belgrade Gymnasium, where he learned to draw and paint from Đorđe Krstić in 1906, and then at the Rista Vukanović School he was taught by painter Marko Murat, sculptor Đorđe Jovanović, and graphic designer Dragutin Inkiostri Medenjak. As a recipient of a government scholarship, he studied at the Academy of Fine Arts in Munich, Germany, until the beginning of the First World War. After voluntarily enlisting in the Serbian army, he was granted the status of an official military artist. He took part in the battles around Belgrade in 1914, and was part of the Serbian army's Great Retreat through the Prokletije mountains of Serbia, Montenegro, and Albania to the Greek island of Corfu during the winter of 1915.

By the end of the hostilities, he was stationed on the Salonika front, and in-field hospitals in Bizerte, Tunisia and in Algeria where 324 Serbian soldiers who did not survive medical treatment were buried at Dély Ibrahim War Cemetery. After the war, Miodrag Petrović continued his art studies in Paris and enjoyed an accomplished and eminent artistic career like the colleagues of his generation in Serbia. In 1949 he founded a guild, the Graphic Artists Collective in Belgrade.

Miodrag Petrović died on 10 February 1950 in Belgrade.

== Works ==
His paintings are found in federal and municipal art museums throughout the country. Also, Petrović's work can be found in private collections, namely, the collection of Milan Jovanović Stojimirović who bequeathed a vast number of paintings and artifacts to the Art Department of the Museum in Smederevo.

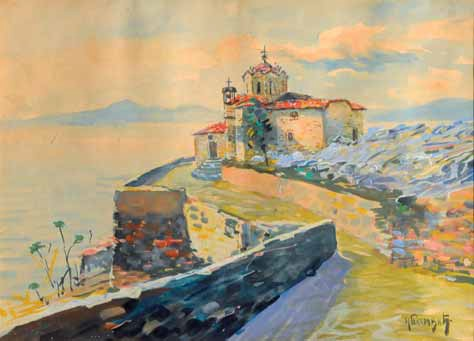
Monastery of St. John Kaneo in Ohrid.

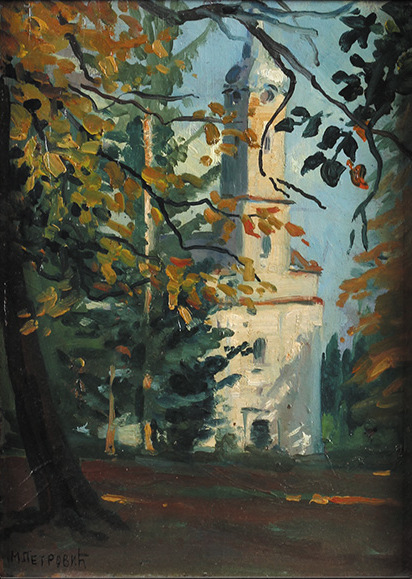
Topčiderska church, 1925

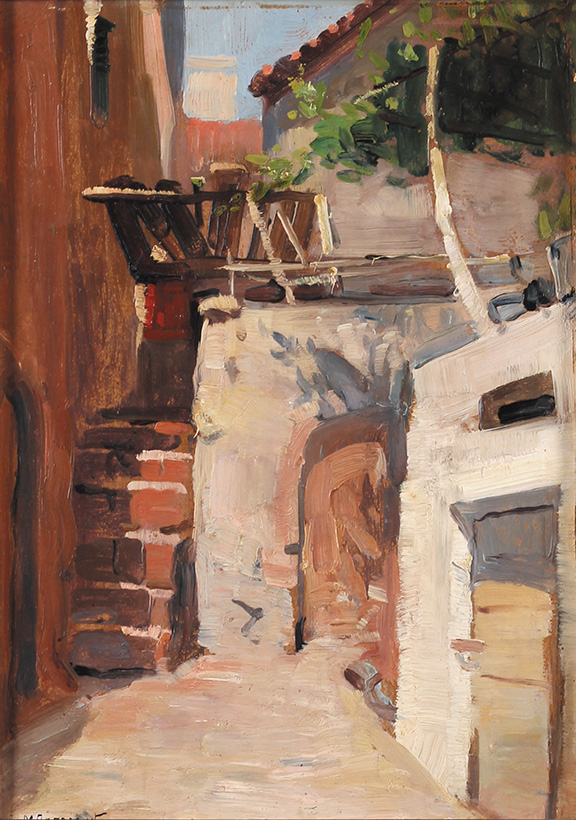
Motif with an old house in Algeria, 1917

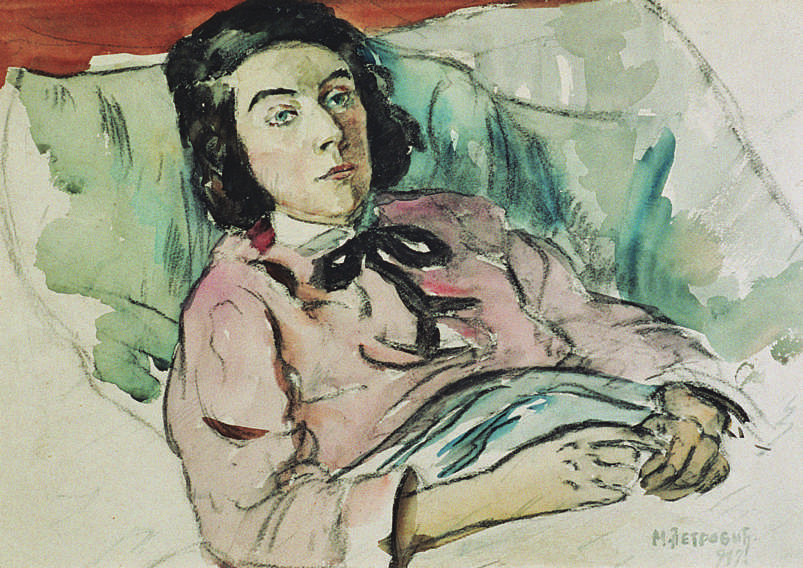
In the hospital, 1917

== See also ==
- List of painters from Serbia
