= Paolo Vietti-Violi =

Italian architect (1882–1965)

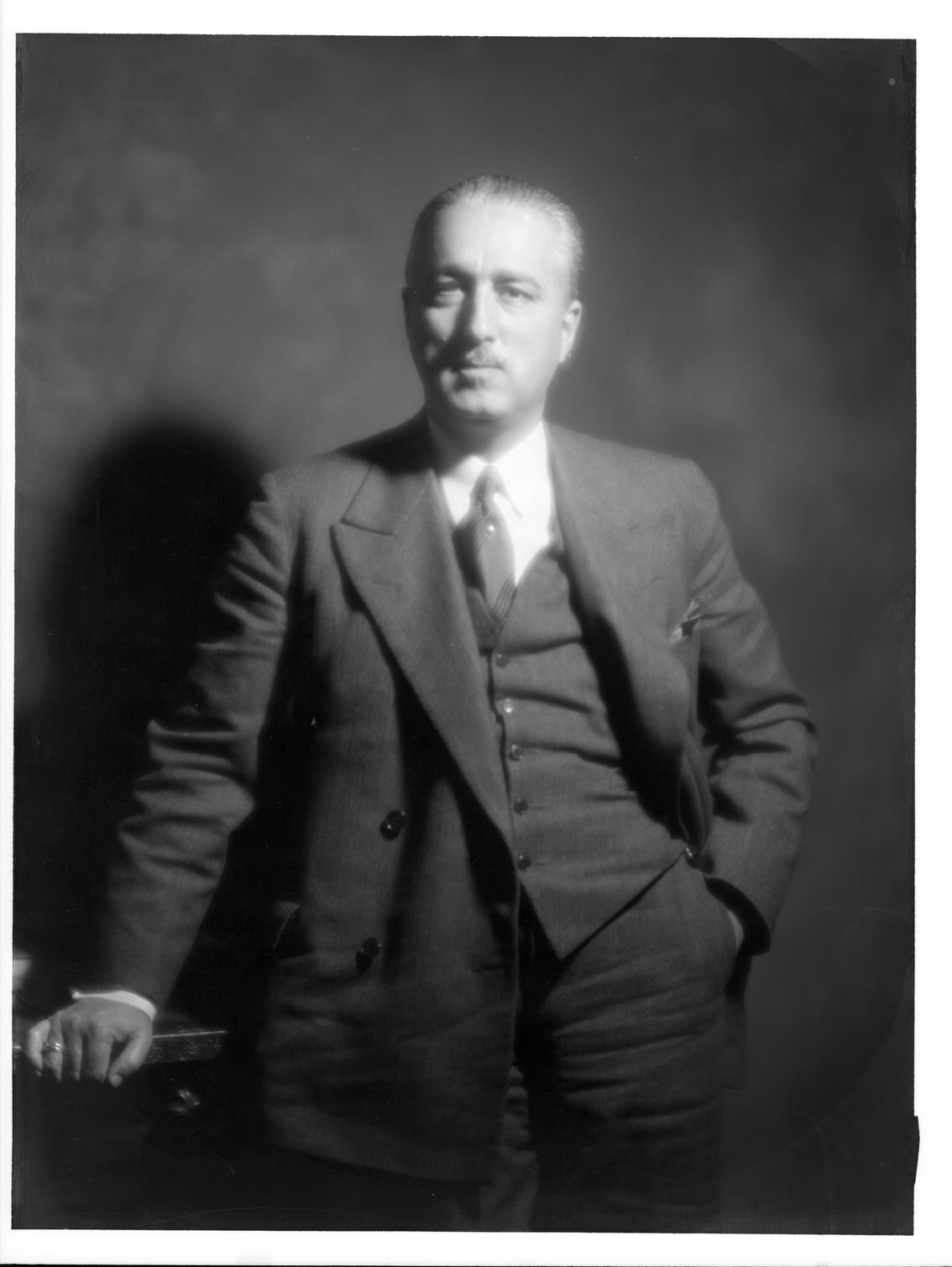
Paolo-Vietti

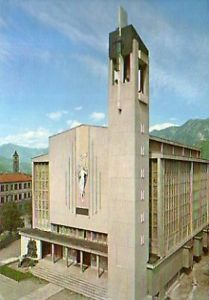

Paolo Vietti-Violi (June 20, 1882, Grandson, Switzerland - December 25, 1965, Vogogna, Italy) was an Italian architect. His work was part of the architecture event in the art competition at the 1928 Summer Olympics.

== Life ==
Vietti-Violi studying architectural drawings at his desk

Born in the French-speaking Switzerland from Italian parents who resided there for business, he studied in Geneva and Paris (at the Ecole des Beaux-Arts) from which he graduated in 1907.

He moved to Milan where in 1914 he re-graduated at the Royal Polytechnic in order to practice his profession in Italy. He then began a career as a designer in the field of sports facilities such as racetracks, stadiums and their complementary structures. His design universe, however, was very large and varied, as evidenced by the different architectural aspects, which are identifiable in the rationalism of the time, still soaked from the original neo-classical French style.

He worked not only in Italy but also in several countries of the Central Europe; he also realized several projects in Turkey, then in India, East Africa and South America (including a Jockey Club in Argentina).

His skills gained him the respect of kings, rulers and aristocrats. In 1907 he married Maria Biraghi Lossetti, an aristocratic heiress of the Lords of Vogogna Biraghi Lossetti, who bore him the following year his son Emanuele, who became an architect and his collaborator in Milan. He was an artillery officer in Genoa during the First World War and in 1944 he became the Mayor of Vogogna during the partisan Republic of Ossola.

Vietti-Violi died in Vogogna at 83 on the Christmas Day of 1965. He was still working on the racecourse Parilly of Lyon and at the new church of Villadossola assisted by his assistant at the time, the architect Vladimiro Francioli.

== Works ==
Paolo Vietti-Violi's sketches can be found in the collection of Milan Jovanović Stojimirović who bequeathed his vast collection of paintings, etchings and artifacts to the Art Department of the Museum in Smederevo.

== Sports Projects ==
An important contribution of Vietti Violi at national and international level was in sport. Vietti-Violi observed in Casabella, the international monthly dedicated to architecture: "... the rebirth of sport and, above all, the spirit of sport in Italy, as directed and organized by the fascist regime, initiated directly on an impressive renovation of sports works". His designs for sports facilities have emphasized the importance of planning the overall context: public transport and access road links, parking and stadium turnstiles. He has designed and supervised works for the construction of more than 33 racecourses, stadiums and sports facilities in Italy and abroad. Among the national ones:

- 1911 Ippodromo di San Siro in Milan, Italy, for the gallop. Winner of the First Prize at the International Competition and execution of the project. Due to the First World War, the works were completed in April 1920.
- 1923 Hippodrome of San Siro in Milan, for the trot;
- 1923 Mirabello Racecourse in Monza, for galloping facilities and hurdles;
- 1923 Casalone racetrack in Grosseto, with attached sports facilities;
- 1924 Capannelle Racecourse in Rome;
- 1926 Ippodromo di Agnano in Naples, for the executive project;
- 1928 Ippodromo delle Cascine in Florence, for the trot, for enlargements and transformations;
- 1928 Ippodromo delle Cascine in Florence, for the gallop, with enlargements and transformations;
- 1928 Merano Racecourse, first facility;
- 1930 Ippodromo dell'Arcoveggio in Bologna, for the trot in collaboration with the engineer Costantini;
- 1933 Ankara Racecourse in Turkey, for galloping and complete sports city. Winner of the First Prize at the International Competition and execution of the project;
- 1934 Istanbul Hippodrome in Turkey, general design for the gallop;
- 1935 Merano racecourse, final design and execution of the works. Construction of the Andreina Stables for 260 horses;
- 1937 Federico Caprilli Racecourse at Ardenza in Livorno, transformation and lighting project;
- 1937 San Siro racecourse in Milan, transformations for the trot and design of stables;
- 1939 Ippodromo delle Cascine in Florence, transformation and design of stables for 200 horses;
- 1939 Mirafiori Racecourse in Turin, grandstand and track transformation project;
- 1939 Addis Ababa Racecourse in Ethiopia, grandstand and track transformation project and associated sports facilities;
- 1940 Le Bettole Racecourse in Varese, grandstand and track transformation project;
- 1950 Racecourse of Valencia in Venezuela, for the gallop and associated sports facilities;
- 1953 Montecatini Racecourse, grandstand, lighting and track transformation project in collaboration with the engineer Venturini;
- 1953 Ippodromo delle Cascine in Florence, for the trot with a project for the transformation of grandstands and tracks;
- 1955 Istanbul Hippodrome in Türkiye, for the gallop. Construction of stables for 260 horses;
- 1957 Hippodrome of Adana in Türkiye, for the gallop;
- 1957 Sayrne Racecourse in Turkey, for the galloping, grandstand, lighting and track transformation project.

Later designs include the Lido racecourse in Venice, Italy, with canter and trot facilities, stables for 260 horses.

In 1913 he went to Argentina, where he was invited to design the new headquarters of the Association Jockey Club of Buenos Aires.
Subsequently he went to Bombay in India, invited by the Western India Turf Club for the selection of designers for the construction of two racecourses in Bombay and Poona.
From 1930 to 1932 he became technical advisor of the Monza racetrack.

In 1932, with the young Hungarian Andreas Benko who collaborated in his studio, he created in Selvino (Bergamo) the Sciesopoli di Selvino, a mountain colony for children commissioned by fascism and named after Antonio Sciesa, hero of the Risorgimento, inaugurated on 11 June 1933. The large colony consists of a complex of avant-garde buildings, completed in a very short time. The colony was equipped with dormitories, refectories, a heated swimming pool, cinema, infirmary, a large park of 17,000 square meters and courtyards for assemblies. Among the numerous financiers of the work who offered a total of 2,580,000 lire, as evidenced by the marble plaque in the entrance hall, there was the Duce Benito Mussolini, who donated 5,000 lire for its construction.

In 1937 in Yugoslavia, he was contacted for the project of the hippodrome of Zemun in Belgrade in Yugoslavia and sports facilities in Sarajevo.
In 1937 in Poland, he was contacted for the Warsaw hippodrome project by the local Jockey Club.
In 1939 in Ethiopia, at the invitation of Equine Breeds Encouragement Society (S.I.R.E.), and request of the Vice King of Ethiopia, the Duke of Aosta, for the complete sports facilities in Addis Ababa.
In 1948 in Bulgaria, he was interviewed by the Bulgarian Government for the project of complete sports facilities in Sofia.

In 1950 in Venezuela, he was invited by the government to study a drainage project for horse racing tracks. Carries out projects for complete sports facilities and the executive project for the racecourse of Valencia, Venezuela.
Subsequently he carried out the project of the San Martino Stadium in Genoa.

The architect Vietti Violi has designed numerous indoor swimming pools during the years of his activity in Italy:
covered swimming pool for the complex of sports facilities of l'Aquila in Abruzzo;
indoor swimming pool for the "Casa del Balilla" complex and related sports facilities Colonia Alpina di Sciesopoli in Selvino in province of Bergamo;
covered swimming pool for the "Casa del Balilla" complex and related sports facilities in Saronno, in Lombardy;
The architect created the Palazzetto dello Sport at the Milan Fair, with the cycle path, which opened in April 1923 and the sports facilities of San Martino d'Albaro, L'Aquila, Merano, Saronno and Milano Marittima (Canella Giuntini, 2009)

In 1936, Vietti Violi's project was inaugurated in Ankara for the expansion to 60,000 seated spectators of the stadium 19 Mayıs Stadio ("May 19 Sports Stadium"), then the scene of many celebrations of national holidays. In a published description of the project, Vietti Violi mentions the militaristic connotations of sports activities in the 1930s: the stadium complex was "a grandiose and exceptional program which made it necessary to create a wide street for military parades" (Bozdoğan, 2001). Participates in the competition for the design of the Mustafa Kemal Atatürk mausoleum, in Anıtkabir (Christopher S. Wilson, 2009). Later in his career he designed BJK İnönü Stadium in Istanbul, Turkey, completed in 1954.

== Civil works projects ==
Vietti Violi participated in numerous design competitions for large civil works: hospitals (Pavia), factories, theaters (Genoa), basilicas (Syracuse), public structures including regional buildings.
He built important workers' villages in Villadossola for about 1000 workers and in Pieve Vergonte he designed the workers' village, offices, laboratories and factories of the local industrial complex.
He participated in numerous competitions:

- competition for the Policlinico in Pavia (second prize);
- competition for the Palazzo delle Belle Arti in Genoa;
- competition for the basilica of Santa Croce in Milan;
- competition for the design of the façade of the Milano Centrale railway station;
- competition for a sports center in Rome;
- competition for the theater in Genoa;
- competition for rural houses in Milan;
- competition for the facade of the Prefecture building in Bolzano;
- competition for the dog track in Milan.

The architect Vietti Violi created numerous projects for private villas:

- villa in via Monferrato in Milan;
- villa of Commendatore Locatelli in Milan;
- Villa Grana and Uffici Pozzo in Giovi in Genoa;
- Villa Castolai in Domodossola;
- villa Marchese in Magognino;
- chalet of the painter Mazza in Macugnaga;

He also carried out numerous projects for residential, hotel and office buildings:

- building for the Palace Columbia hotel in Genoa;
- hotel building in Fiumetto;
- hotel building in Perugia;
- Palazzo Cantoni-Pisa in Milan;
- building for the Maison de France in Milan;
- building for the Guzzi property in Milan;
- building for the headquarters of the Nafta company in Genoa;
- building for the headquarters of the Shell company in Genoa;
- Palazzo della Cavallerizza of San Siro in Milan;
- building for the offices of the Saint-Gobain company in Milan;
- building for the expansion of the medical department of the San Biagio hospital in Domodossola;
- building for the town hall of Macugnaga;
- building for the Sporting Club in Milano Marittima;
- sports palace in Milan;
- building for the Vigorelli cycle path in Milan;
- works of the Milan Fair, where the architect created the entrance on via Domodossola, Palazzo degli Orafi and Palazzo della Francia in collaboration with the architect Boileau from Paris.

== Projects of religious buildings ==
Vietti Violi created projects for religious buildings:

- parish church of Cermes in South Tyrol
- parish church of Villadossola in Piedmont

He participated in numerous competitions of religious works:

- competition for the sanctuary of the Madonna delle Lacrime of Syracuse in Sicily (second prize)
- competition for the conservative makeover of the sanctuary of the Madonna del Lut in Premosello in Piedmont (first prize - not realised)
- competition for the conservative makeover of the sanctuary of the Madonna del Boden in Ornavasso in Piedmont (first prize - not realised)

== Bibliography ==
- Maria Canella, Sergio Giuntini, "Sport e fascismo", Collana La società moderna e contemporanea, Argomenti Storia sociale e demografica - Storia della cultura e del costume, pp. 544, 1a edizione 2009(Codice editore 1501.110)Franco Angeli Edizioni Codice ISBN 9788856815108
- Raffaele Calzini, Paolo Vietti-Violi, Éditions "Les Archives internationales", 1932
- Sibel Bozdoğan, "Modernism and Nation Building: Turkish Architectural Culture in the Early Republic", 2001 by the University of Washington Press, printed in Singapore, ISBN 0-295-98110-5
- Simon Martin, Football and Fascism: The National Game Under Mussolin i - Berg, 2004, New York, USA
- I.N. Aslanoglu, "Two Italian Architects: Giulio Mongeri and Paolo Vietti-Violi during the Periods of First Nationalism and Early Modernism in Ankara," in "Atti del Convegno Architettura e architetti italiani ad Istanbul tra il XIX e il XX secolo", Facoltà di architettura dell' Università Mimar Sinan, Istanbul 27-28 novembre 1995
