= Đorđe Jovanović House =

Historic home of sculptor Đorđe Jovanović

Coordinates: 44.7968°N 20.4674°E

The Sculptor Đorđe Jovanović's House
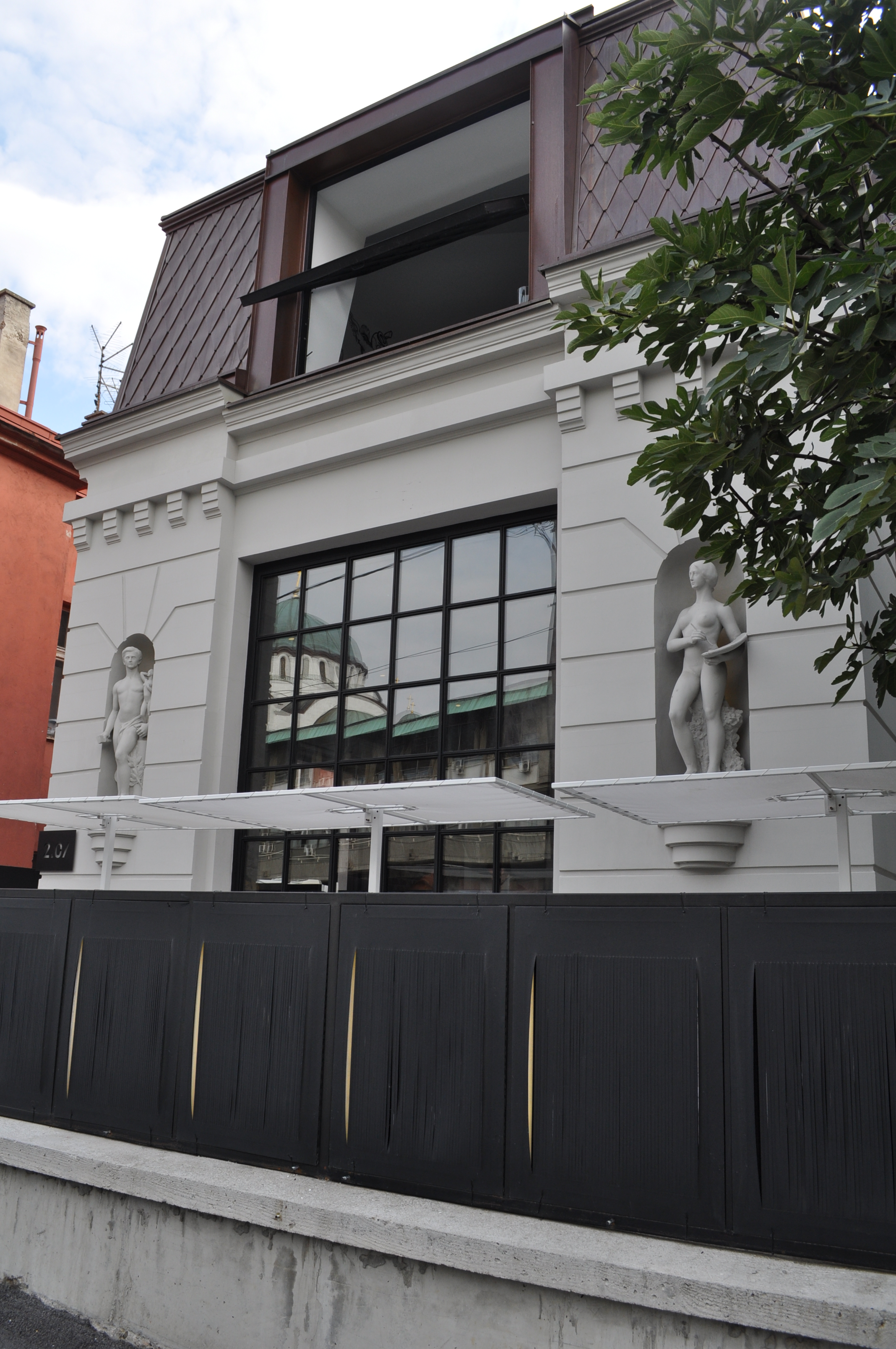
- The Sculptor Đorđe Jovanović's House
- Interactive map of The Sculptor Đorđe Jovanović's House

General information
- Status: Cultural heritage
- Location: Belgrade, Vračar, Serbia
- Completed: 1926

Website
- http://beogradskonasledje.rs/

The Sculptor Đorđe Jovanović's House is at 6 Skerlićeva Street, Belgrade, and has the status of a cultural monument.

== Đorđe Jovanović ==
Educated in Belgrade, Vienna, Munich and Paris, the sculptor Đorđe Jovanović, along with Petar Ubavkić, became one of the most eminent Serbian sculptors at the turn of the nineteenth century. As one of the founders of the Art School, which later developed to Art Academy, Jovanović was particularly dedicated to pedagogical work. The most important part of his creative works are public monuments and portraits, among which the special place take the following: the Memorial to Kosovo Heroes in Kruševac, the monuments to Knez Mihailo in Požarevac, to Josif Pančić, Kosta Taušanović, Vuk Karadžić and Vojvoda Vuk in Belgrade, as well as the series of tombstones in Belgrade's New Cemetery.

== Architecture ==
The house with a studio, where Đorđe Jovanović, a sculptor, used to live and work was built in 1926, after the design by the architect Dragutin Šiđanski and the engineer Stojan Veljković.

The simple but dynamic facades are complemented with the allegoric figures of painting and sculpture, placed in semi-circular niches Placed at the prominent part of the facade. These figures symbolize the artist's house.

In the house he used to live in there was also his studio, 6m x 6m, with one glass wall which enabled the light penetration necessary for his creative work. Specially designed niches intended for placing the sculptures on the front facade showed that a sculptor lived in that house, there was one female sculpture which symbolizes painting, and the male one symbolizes the sculpture. The basic residential area was on the ground floor, and consisted of four rooms with a bathroom and the stairway. The artistic studio, in which there was a great number of art works, models, plaques and sketches, had a dominant position in the house.

== See also ==
- Đorđe Jovanović
- List of buildings in Belgrade
