= Pavle Čortanović =

Serbian painter

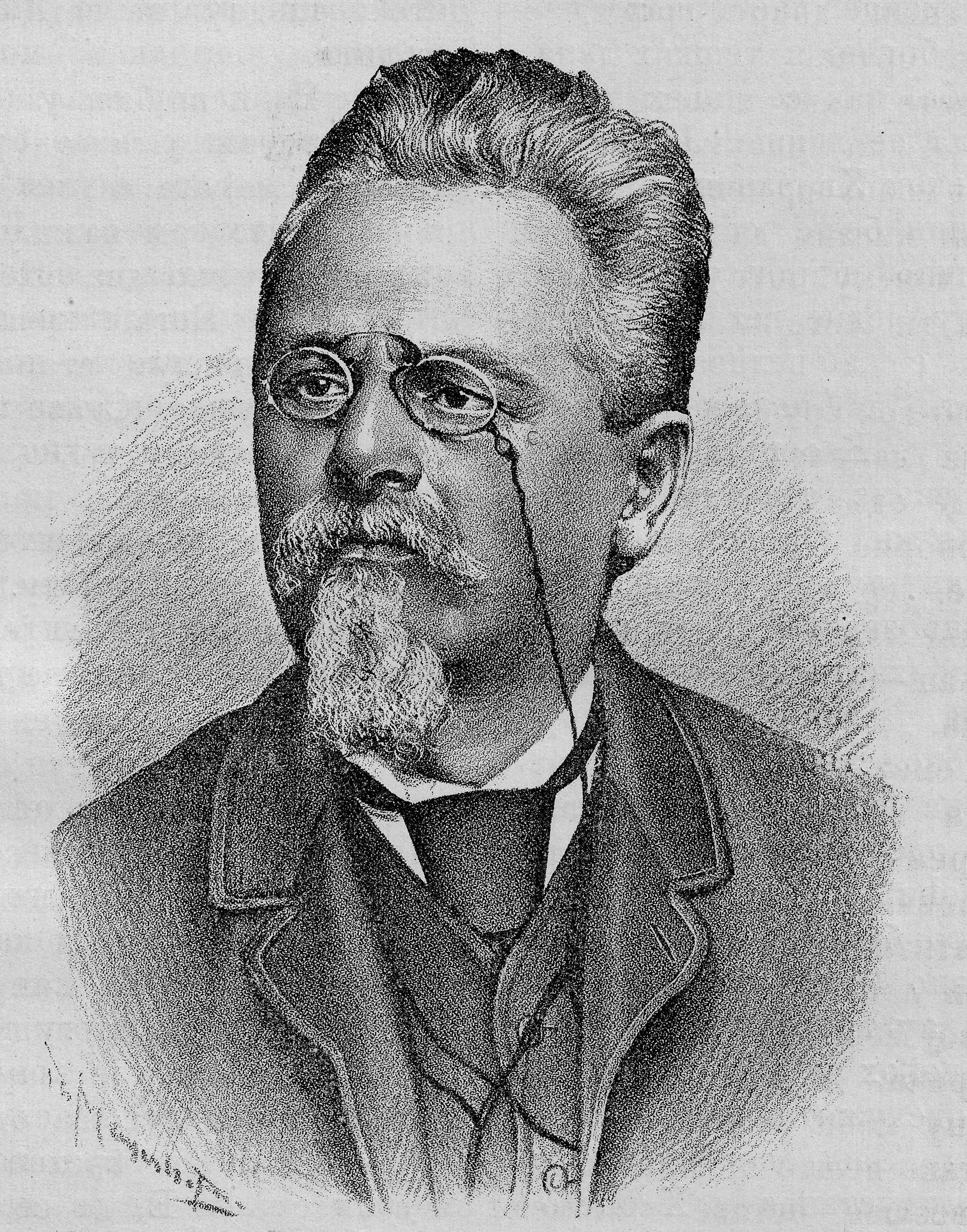
Pavle Čortanović

Pavle Čortanović (5 February 1830 – 31 March 1903) was a Serbian painter.

== Biography ==
Born in Novi Sad, he was the son and student of Petar Čortanović. Pavle also studied art at the Vienna Academy of Fine Arts from 1845 until the winter semester of 1852–1853.

He was the author of many icons that grace the sanctuary screens (iconostasis) of Serbian Orthodox churches in Vojka (1859), Vasica (1863), Bodegraj (1885), and also in Besenov, Ravanica, Grabovo, Stara Pazova, Veliki Radinci, Berkasovo, Ruma, Lalić and other places. He also painted portrait of Miloš Obrenović, prince and ruler of the Principality of Serbia.

Čortanović died in Belgrade.

Works by Pavle Čortanović can be found in art galleries and museums throughout the country. Also, Čortanović's work can be found in the collection of Milan Jovanović Stojimirović who bequeathed a large number of paintings, sketches, and artifacts to the Art Department of the Museum in Smederevo.

== Selected works ==
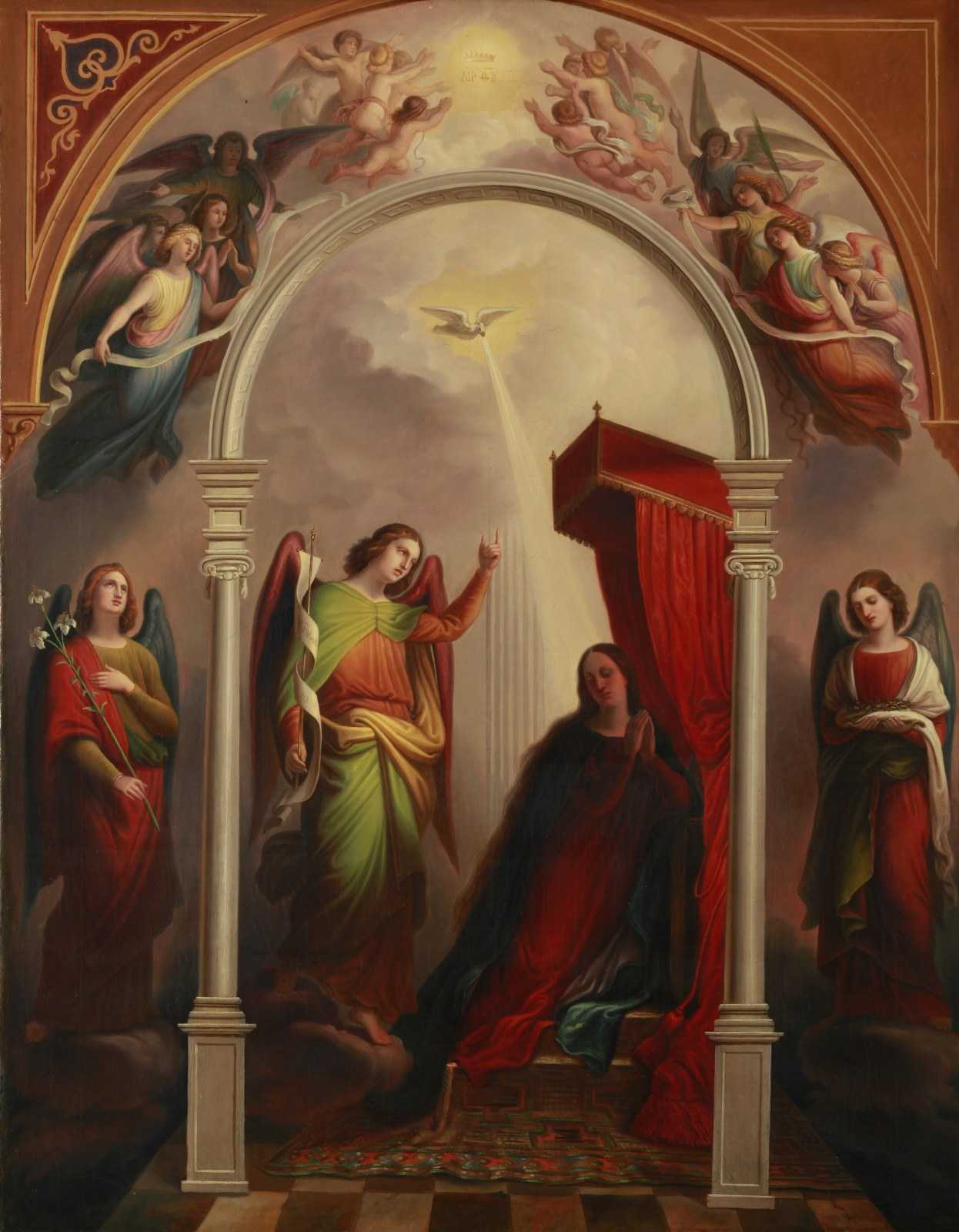
Annunciation (1852)

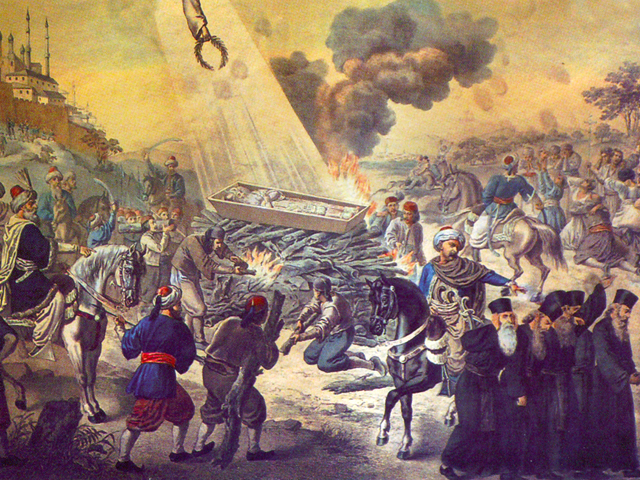
Burning of the Relics of St. Sava (1860)

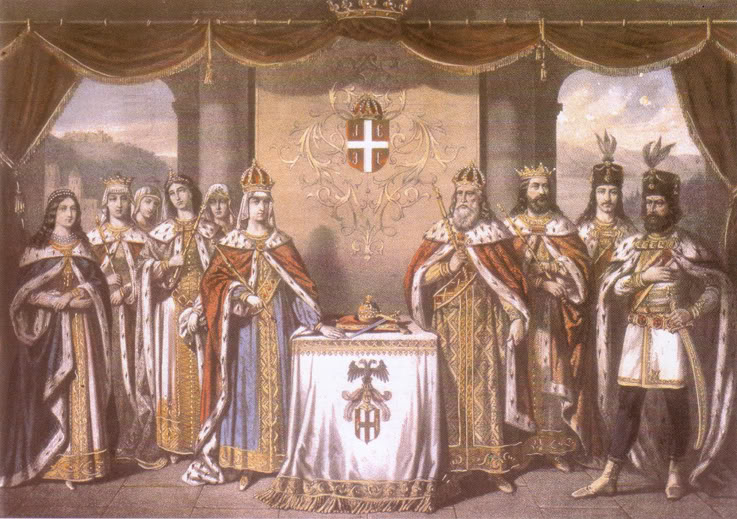
Tsar Lazar and Family (1860)

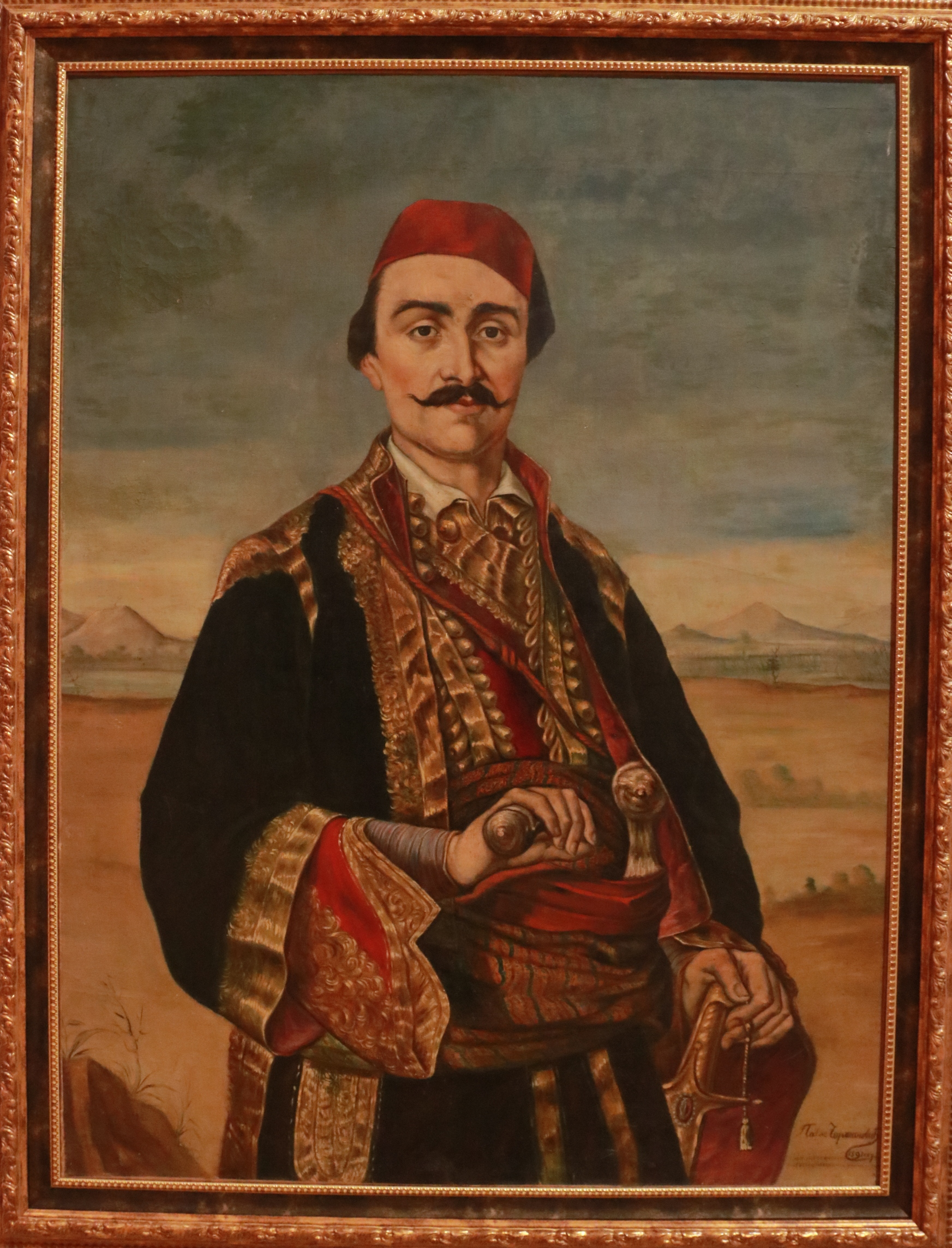
Portrait of Hajduk Veljko (1900)

== See also ==
- List of painters from Serbia
- Serbian art
