= Đorđe Jovanović (sculptor) =

Serbian sculptor

Đorđe Jovanović Ђорђе Јовановић
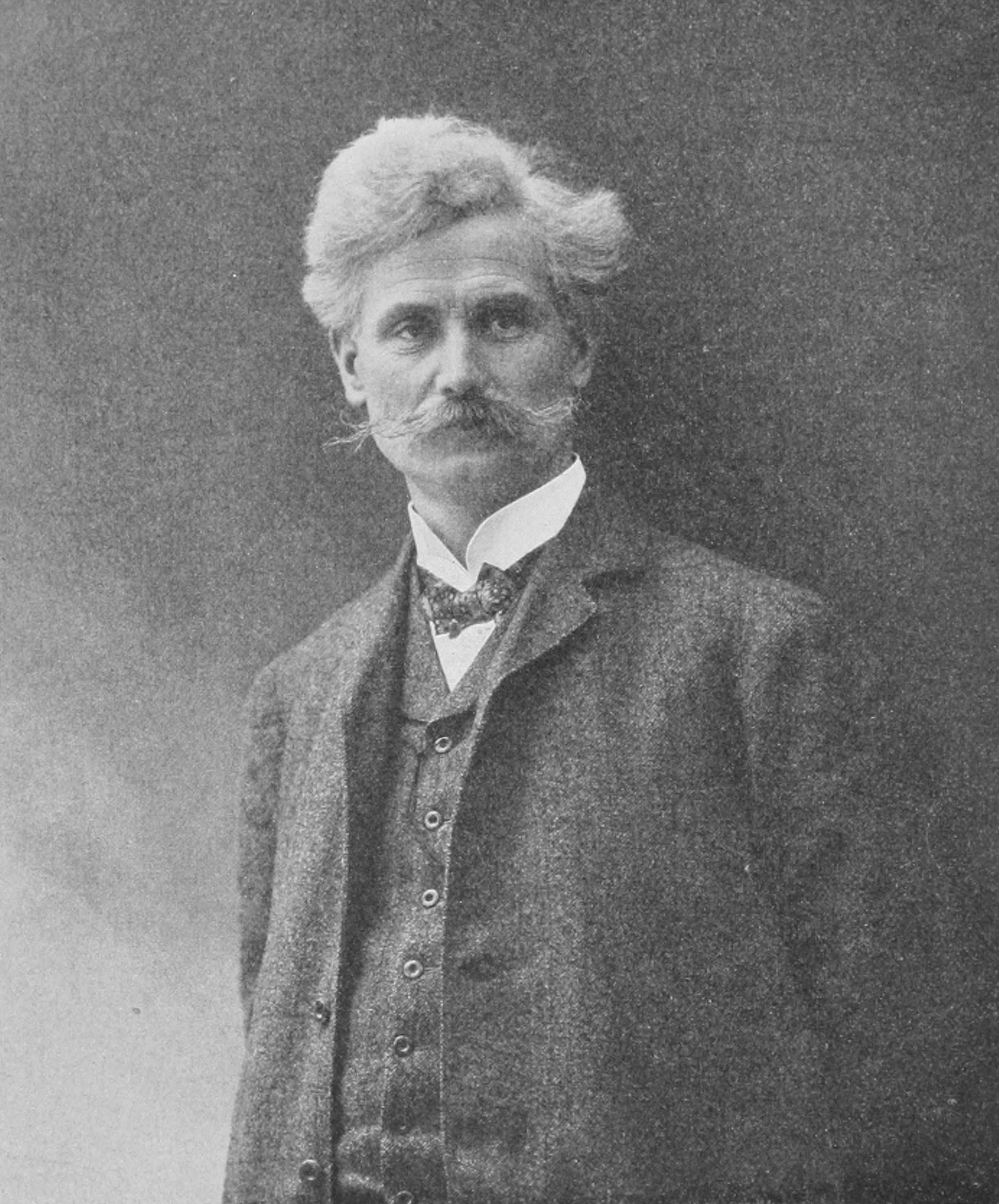
- Photo of Jovanović
- Born: 21 January 1861; Novi Sad, Austrian Empire
- Died: 23 March 1953 (aged 92); Belgrade, FPR Yugoslavia
- Education: Academy of Fine Arts, Munich
- Known for: Sculpture

Đorđe Jovanović (21 January 1861 – 26 March 1953) was a Serbian sculptor, professor and academic. His sculptural opus contains 628 works.

== Biography ==
Jovanović was born in Novi Sad, where he spent the first three years of his life. He was born as the youngest of seven children. His father was of Greek origin, from southern Macedonia. His mother, Jovanka Jovanović, was a Serbian woman, the daughter of a wealthy merchant from Ivanjica or Užice. Jovanović’s father graduated from the Seminary in Belgrade and settled in Novi Sad, where he worked as a teacher. The family moved to the Principality of Serbia because his mother did not want her children to become Austrian soldiers.

He studied at Kragujevac, where he obtained his baccalauréat from Velika škola in 1882. In 1884, he obtained a state grant to pursue his post-graduate studies at the Academy of Fine Arts in Vienna, where he started studying painting and sculpture. He also studied at the Academy of Fine Arts in Munich.

After completing his studies in 1887, he lived between Munich, Paris, and Belgrade. In Paris, he improved his art with Henri Chapu and Jean Antoine Injalbert. In 1889, at the World Exhibition in Paris, he won a prize for the "Gusle" and then, in 1900, at the World Exhibition in Paris, he won the first award for the "Kosovo Monument".

Sculptor and Cartoonist Jovan Pešić (1866—1936) was one of his early students in Novi Sad.

He exhibited his artworks as a part of Kingdom of Serbia's pavilion at International Exhibition of Art of 1911.

His sculpture of Prince Miloš was demolished by Bulgarian forces in 1916. Jovanović was very prolific. Today his work can be found in parks, art galleries, and museums throughout Serbia. Also, Đorđe Jovanović work can be found in the collection of Milan Jovanović Stojimirović who bequeathed a large number of sculptures, paintings, sketches, and artifacts to the Art Department of the Museum in Smederevo.

== Personal life ==
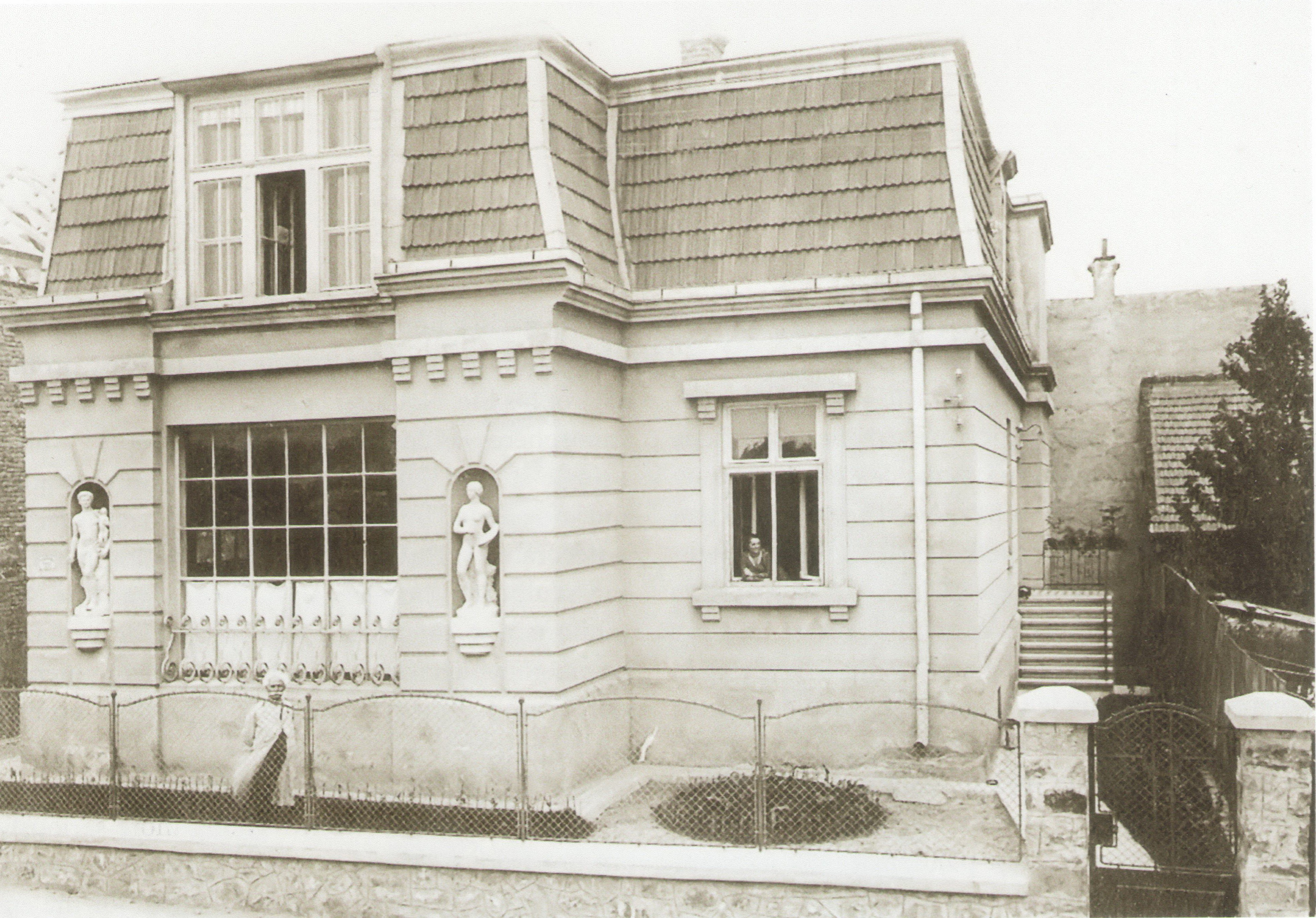
Jovanović's home and studio in Belgrade

Jovanović married Emma Victoria Scheitler on 26 September 1889. They had two sons: Mirko (1892–1915) and Branko (1895–1939). After Emma Victoria died in 1928 near Munich, Jovanović married Marguerite Robert (1879–1965).

In his Autobiography (1947) Jovanović wrote: My Serbian people know me, appreciate me, respect me, and love me, as I love them, for whom I was born, and because of that I have the right to be completely proud and satisfied.

== Exhibitions ==
Solo

- 1887, Belgrade, National Museum (The Spinning)
- 1891, Belgrade, Civil Casino (Josif Pančić)
- 1895, Novi Sad, Hotel “Jelisaveta”
- 1901, Belgrade, Studio of Milan Jovanović (Queen Draga)
- 1905, Belgrade, Hotel “Serbian Crown”
- 1915, Belgrade (with Ljubomir Ivanović)
- 1921, Belgrade, Men’s Gymnasium
- 1923, Novi Sad
- 1928, Belgrade (with Ljubomir Ivanović and Bora Stevanović)
- 1935, Belgrade
- 1935, Novi Sad, Museum of Matica Srpska

Group

- 1884, Vienna, Academy of Fine Arts (Oil paintings)
- 1902/3, Petrograd, International Exhibition
- 1903, Paris, Exhibition of the Paris Municipality
- 1904 and 1912, Belgrade, Yugoslav Art Exhibition
- 1905, Liège, International Exhibition
- 1906, Sofia, Yugoslav Art Exhibition
- 1907, London, Balkan Exhibition
- 1908, Zagreb, Yugoslav Art Exhibition
- 1911, Rome, International Exhibition
- 1917, Lyon, Serbian Exhibition of Art and Domestic Crafts
- 1917, Paris, Exhibition of Yugoslav Art and Folklore
- 1918, Geneva
- 1919, Paris, Yugoslav Art Exhibition
- 1921, Sombor, Exhibition of Fine Artists from Belgrade
- 1939, Belgrade, Stojanović's and Men’s Gymnasium
- 1945, Belgrade, Association of Fine Artists of Serbia
- 1889, 1945, Paris, World Exhibitions
- Paris, Salon: 1889, 1891, 1898, 1899, 1902, 1903, 1906, 1908, 1911, 1912, 1913, 1919
- “Lada” exhibitions: 1906, 1907, 1908, 1909, 1910

== Gallery ==
Statue at Jovanović's tomb

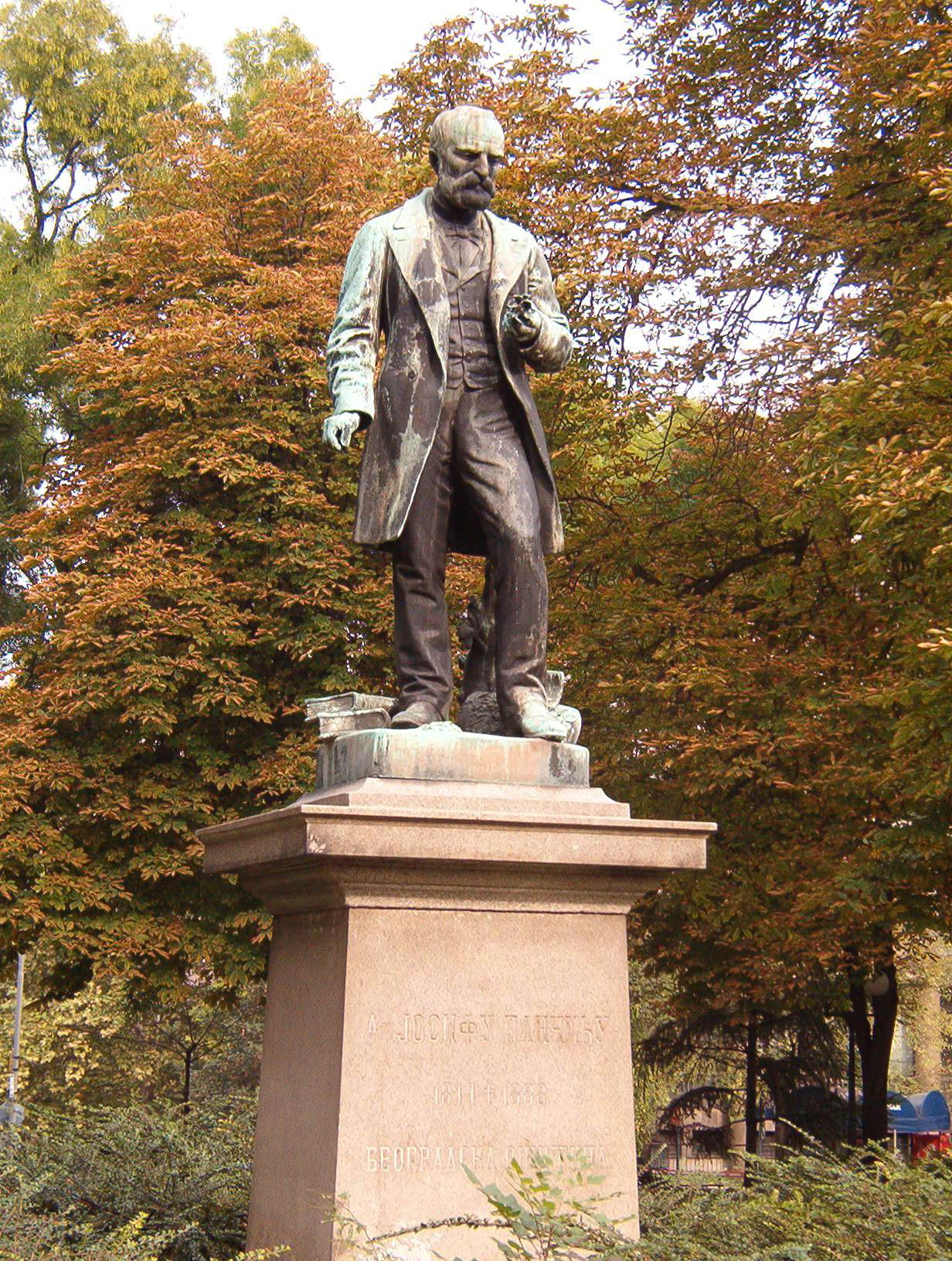
Josif Pančić

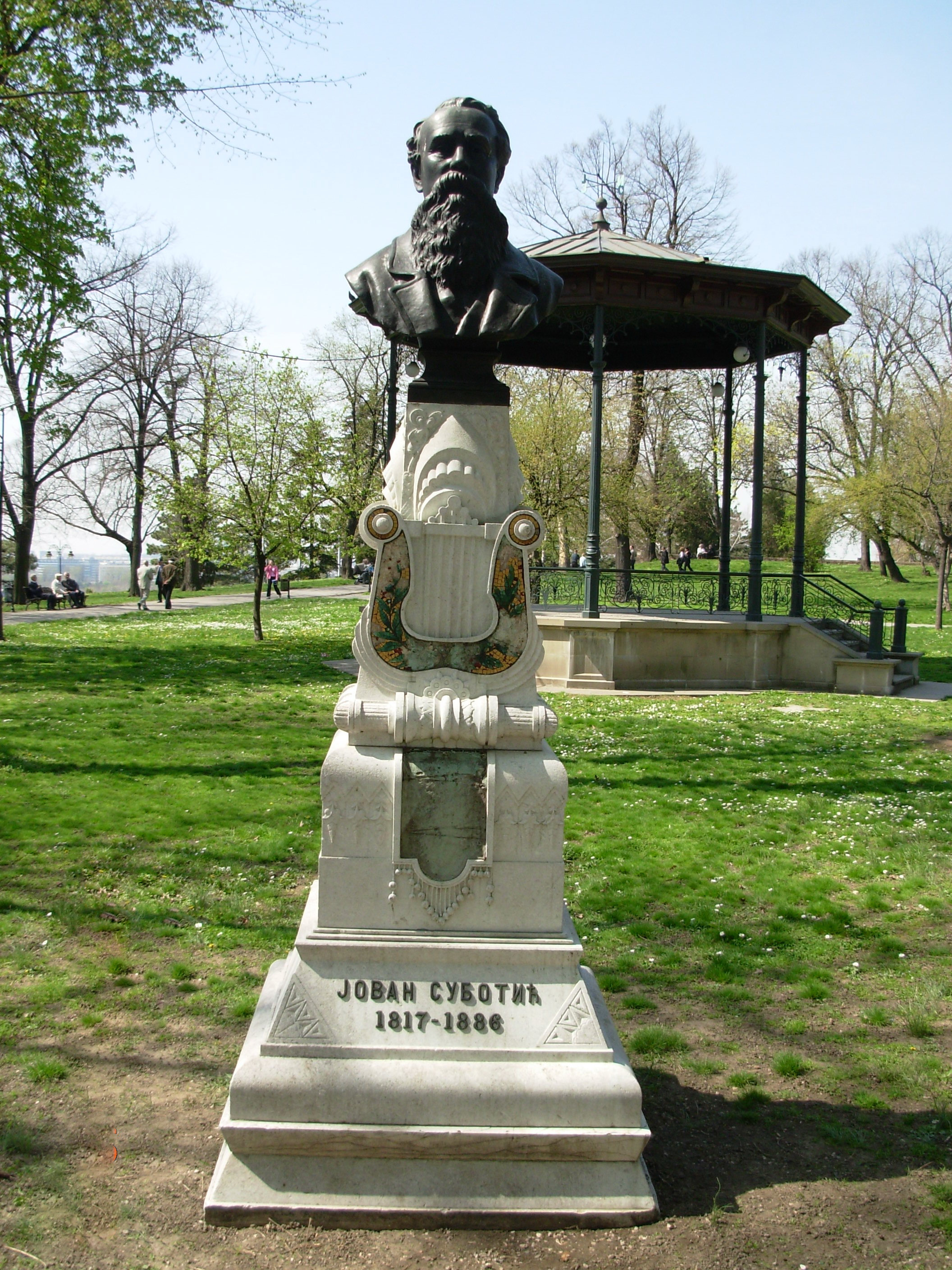
Jovan Subotić

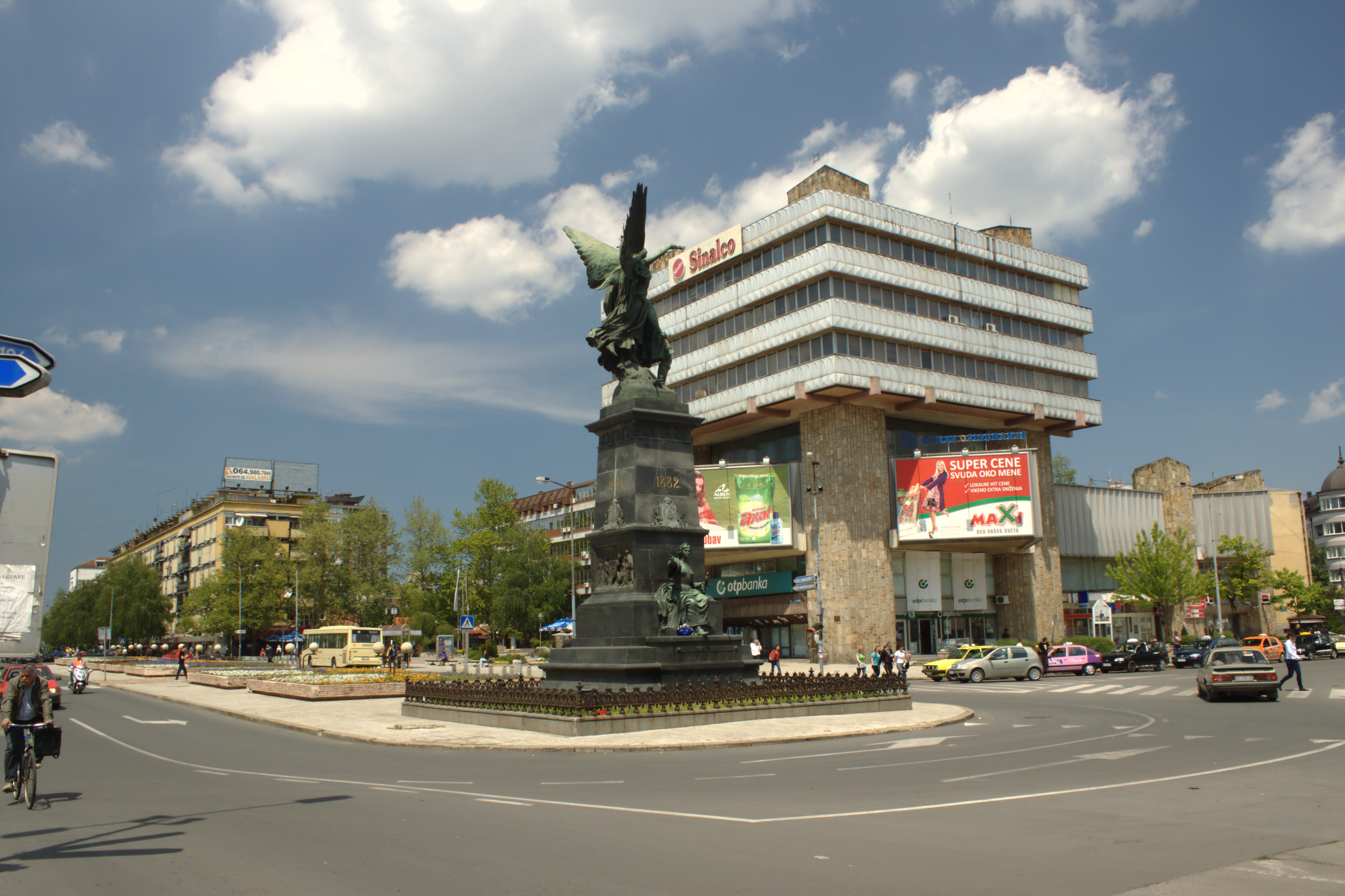
Monument to heroes of Kosovo

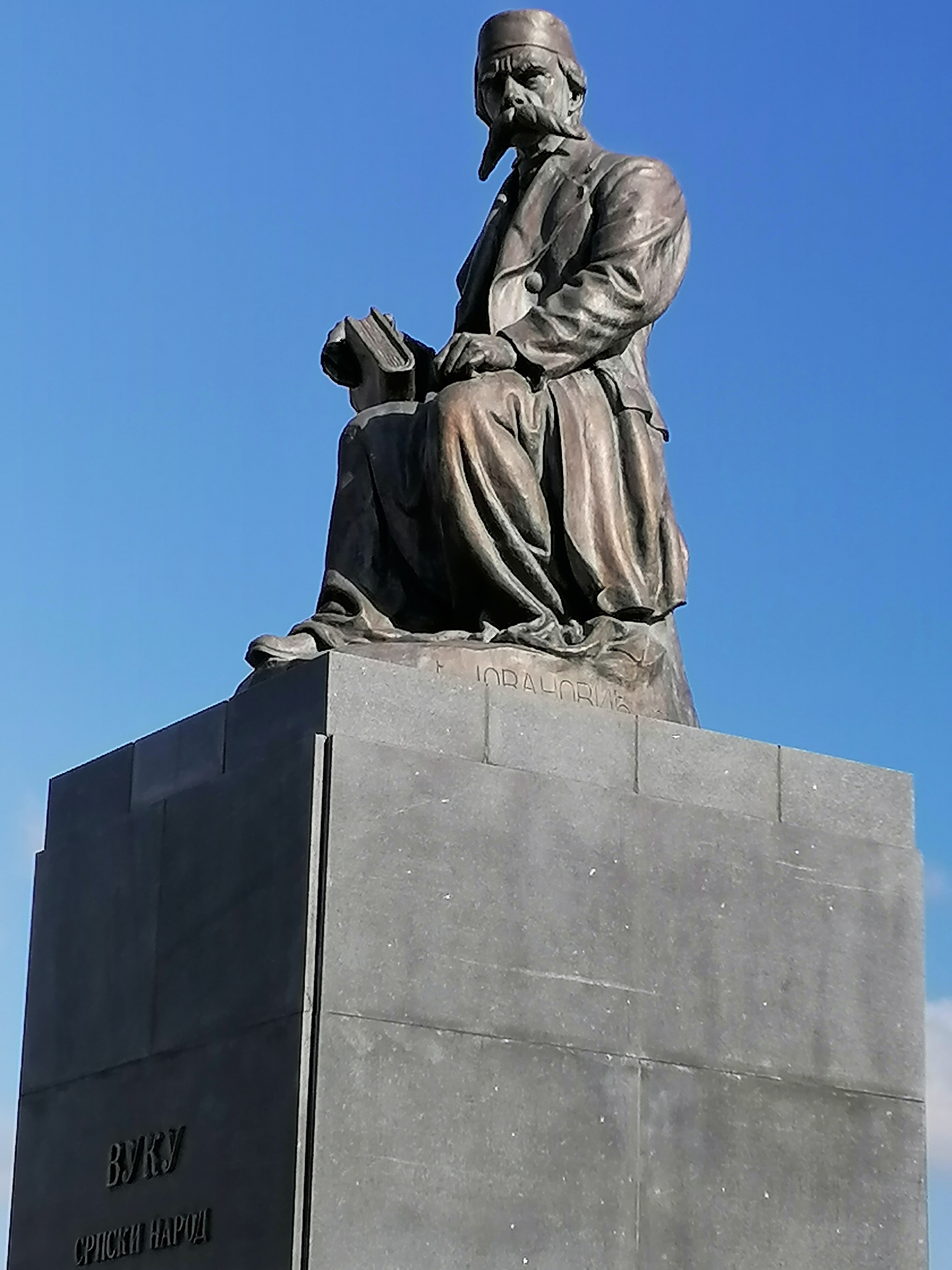
Vuk's monument

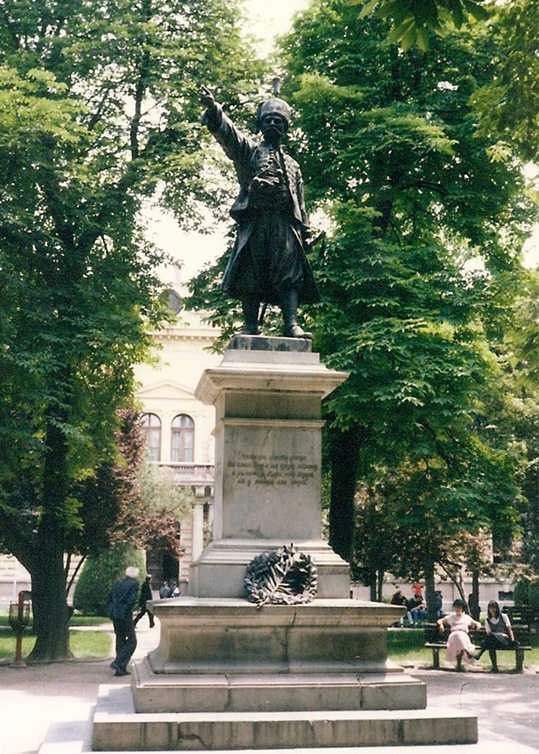
Miloš Obrenović

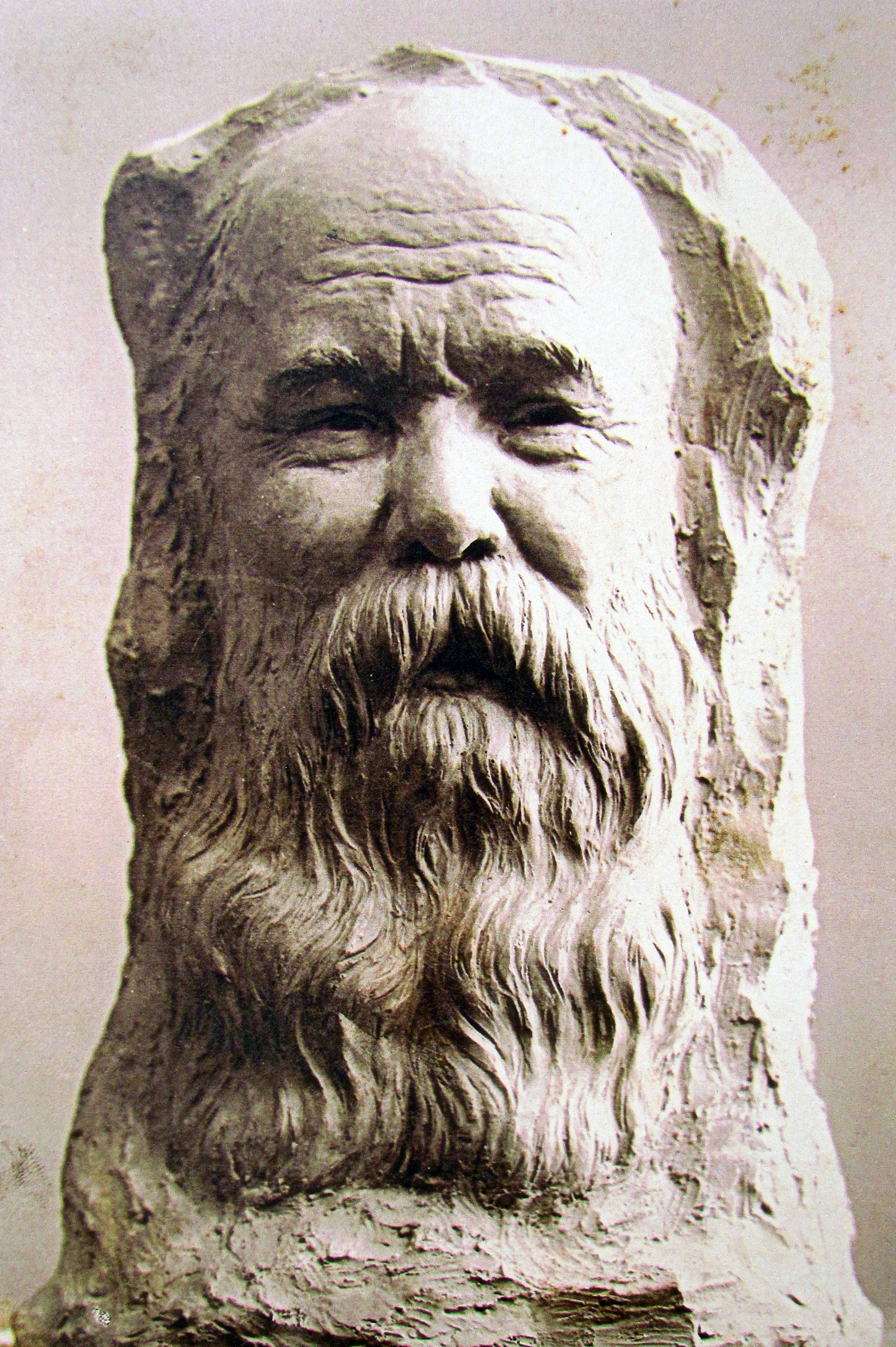
Milovan Glišić

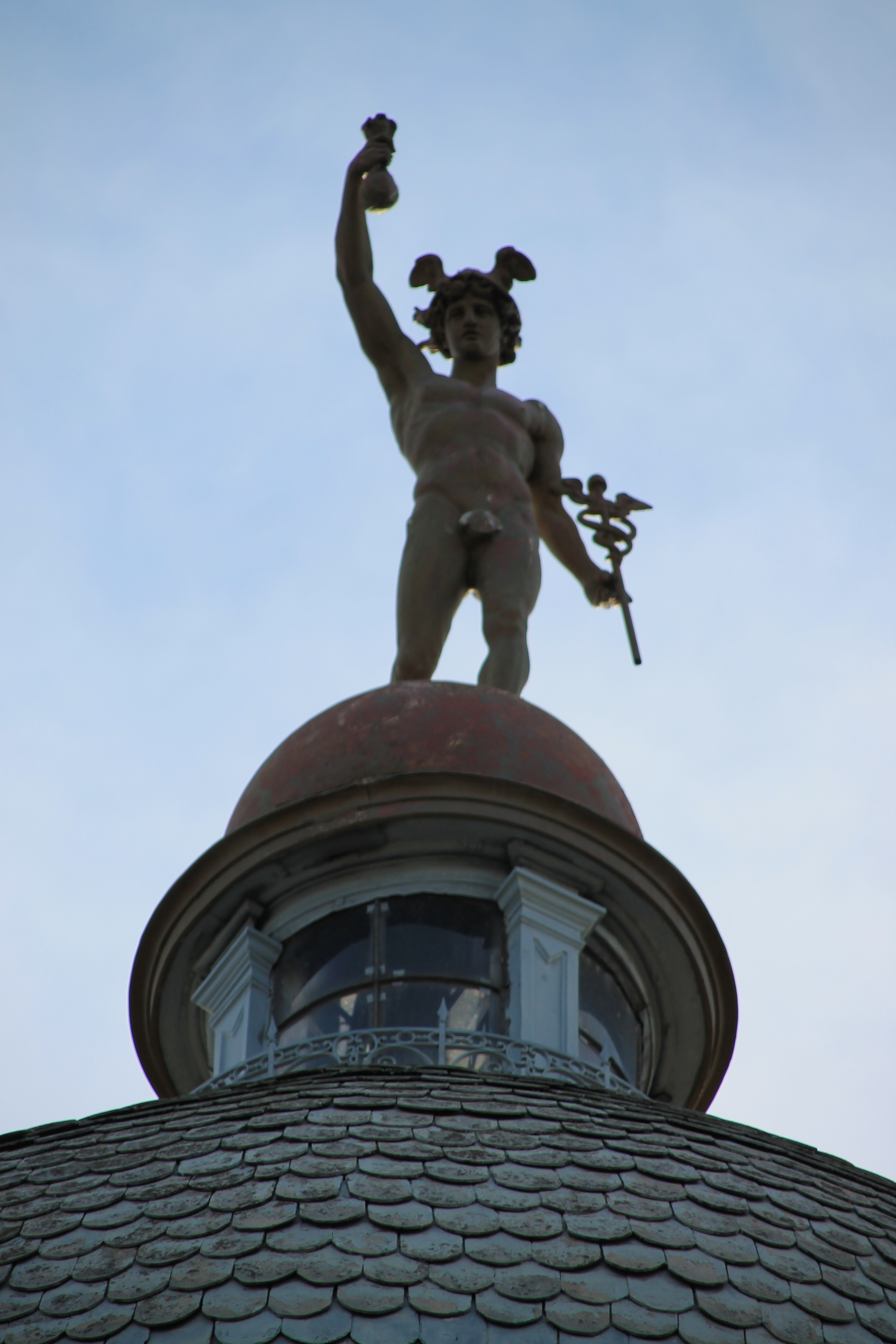
Mercury on top of the Central credits bureau building in Novi Sad, 1896

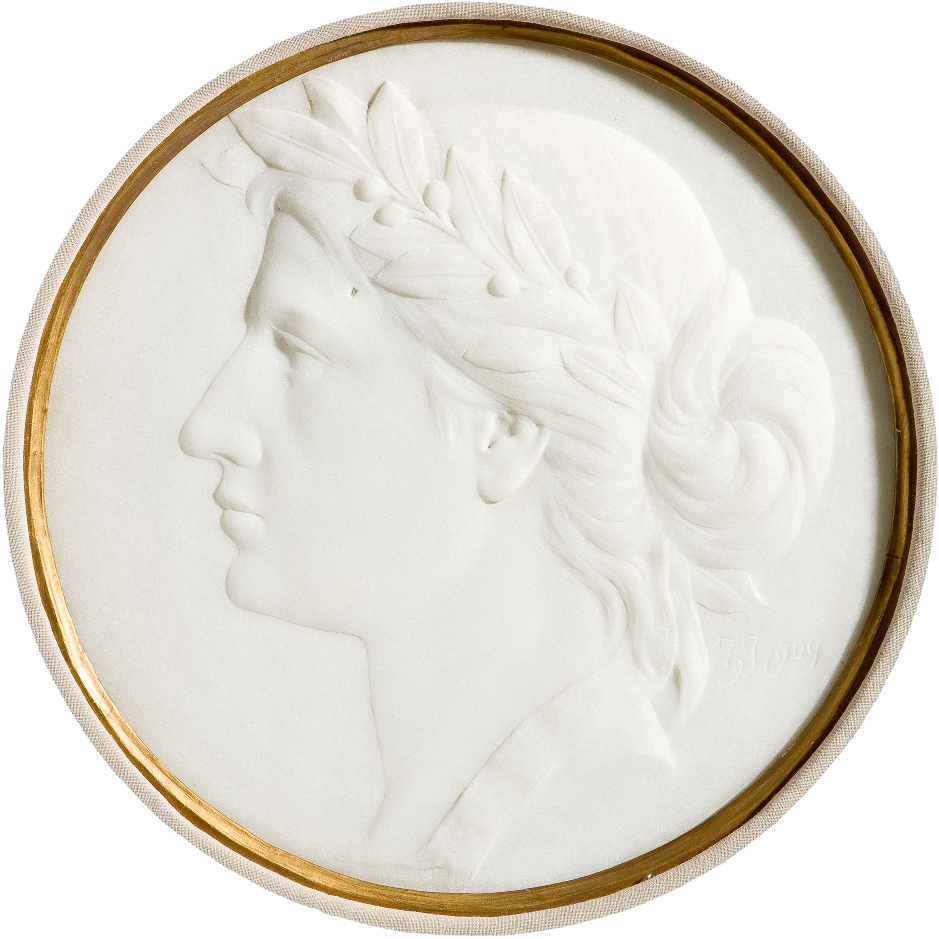
Serbia

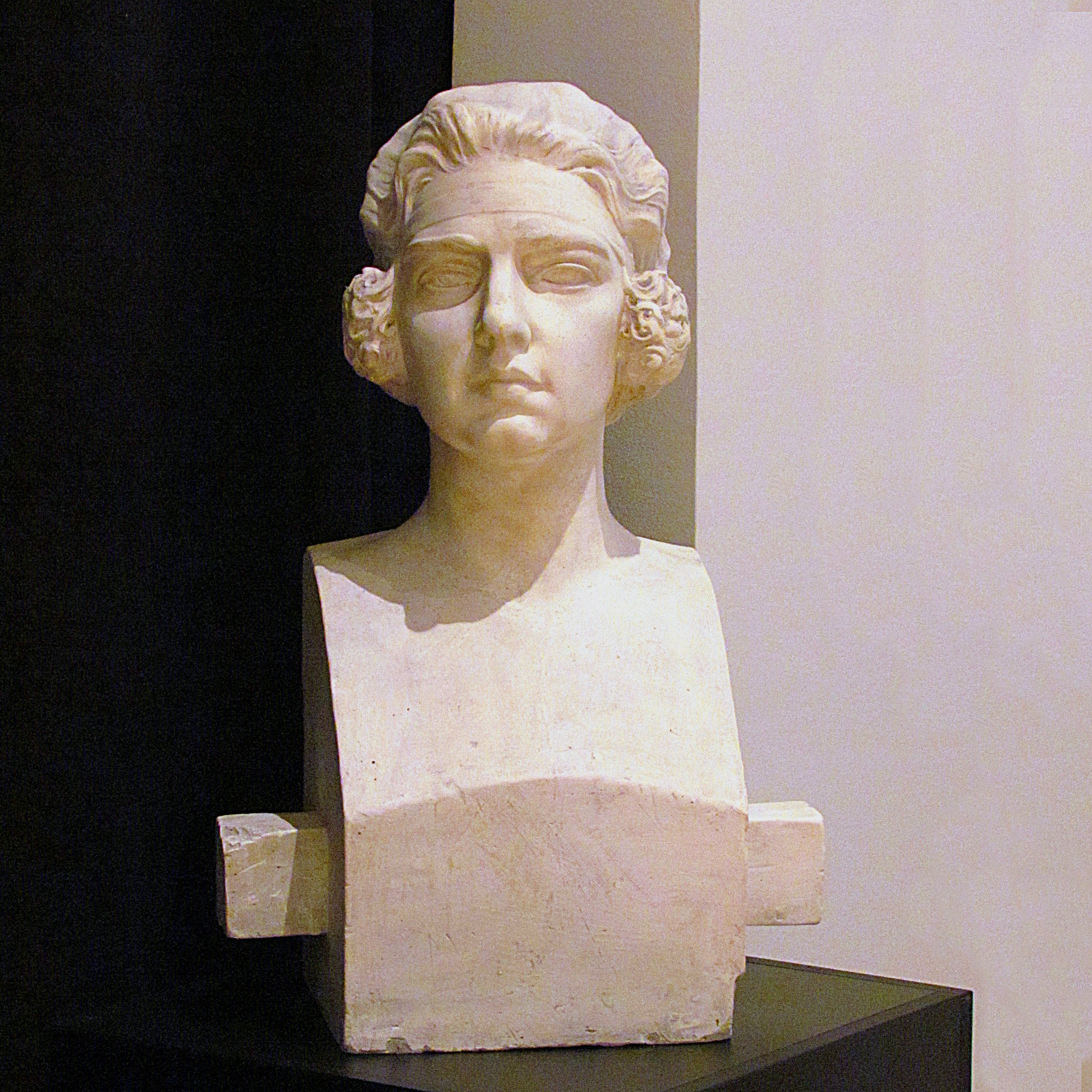
Bust of queen Marija Karađorđević

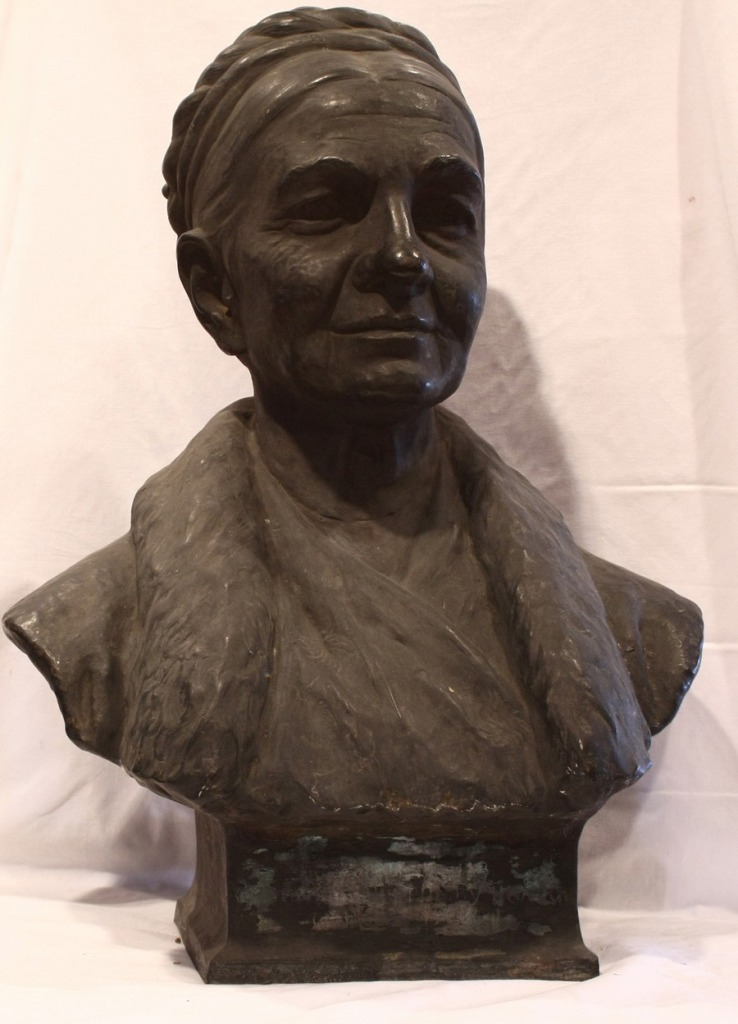
Bust of Katarina Stojimirović

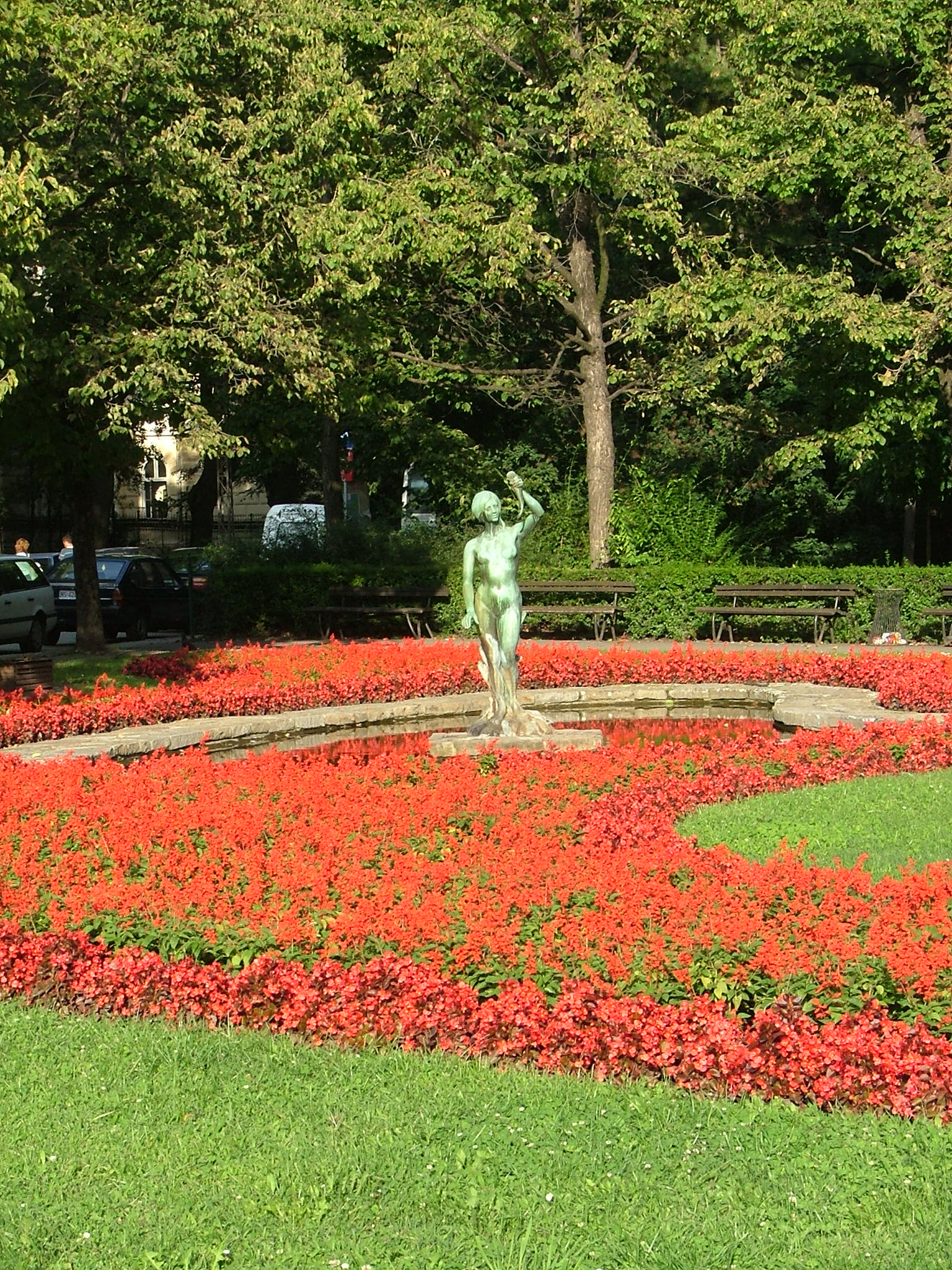
Statue of a Nymph with Cornucopia in Dunavski park, Novi Sad, 1912

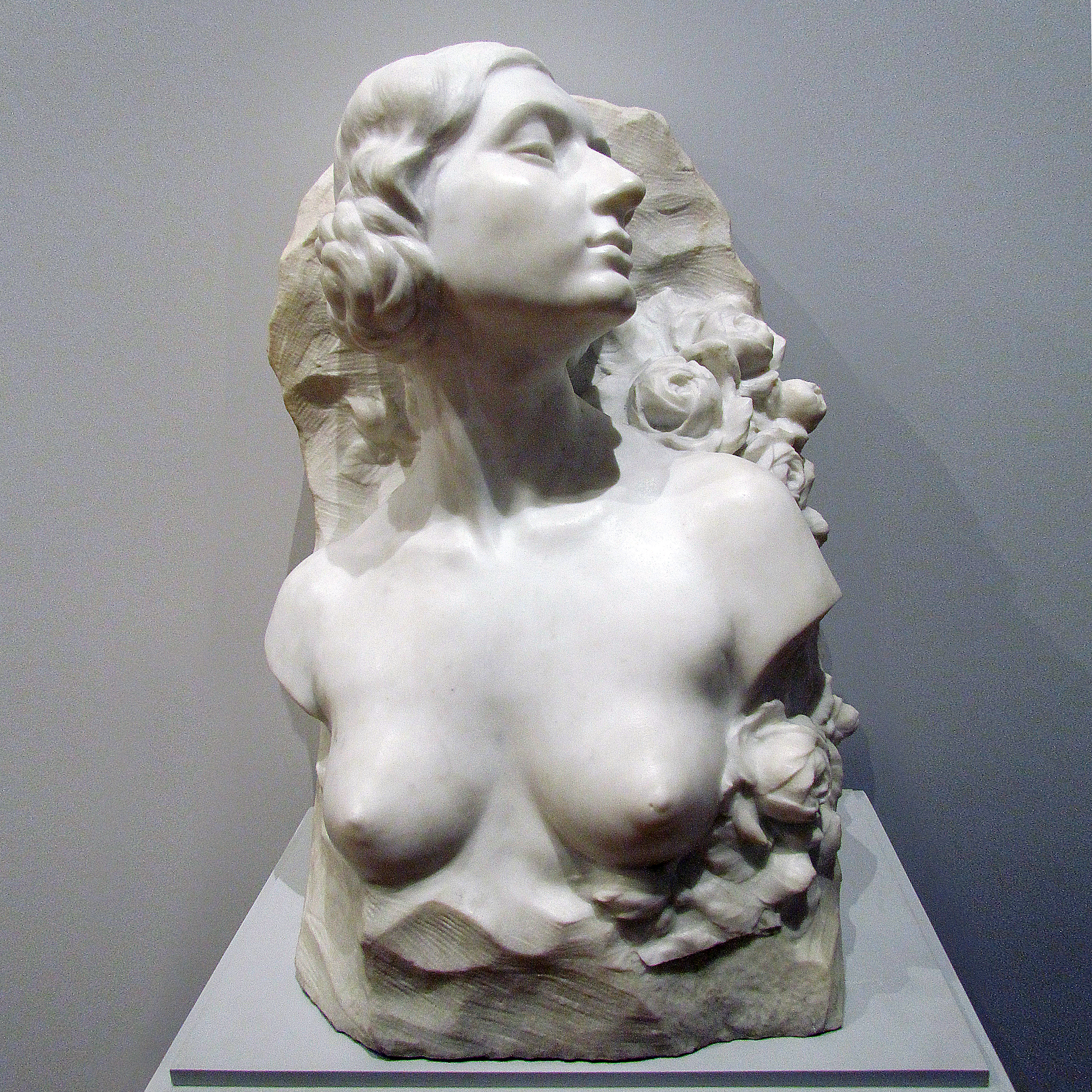
The Fragrance of Roses

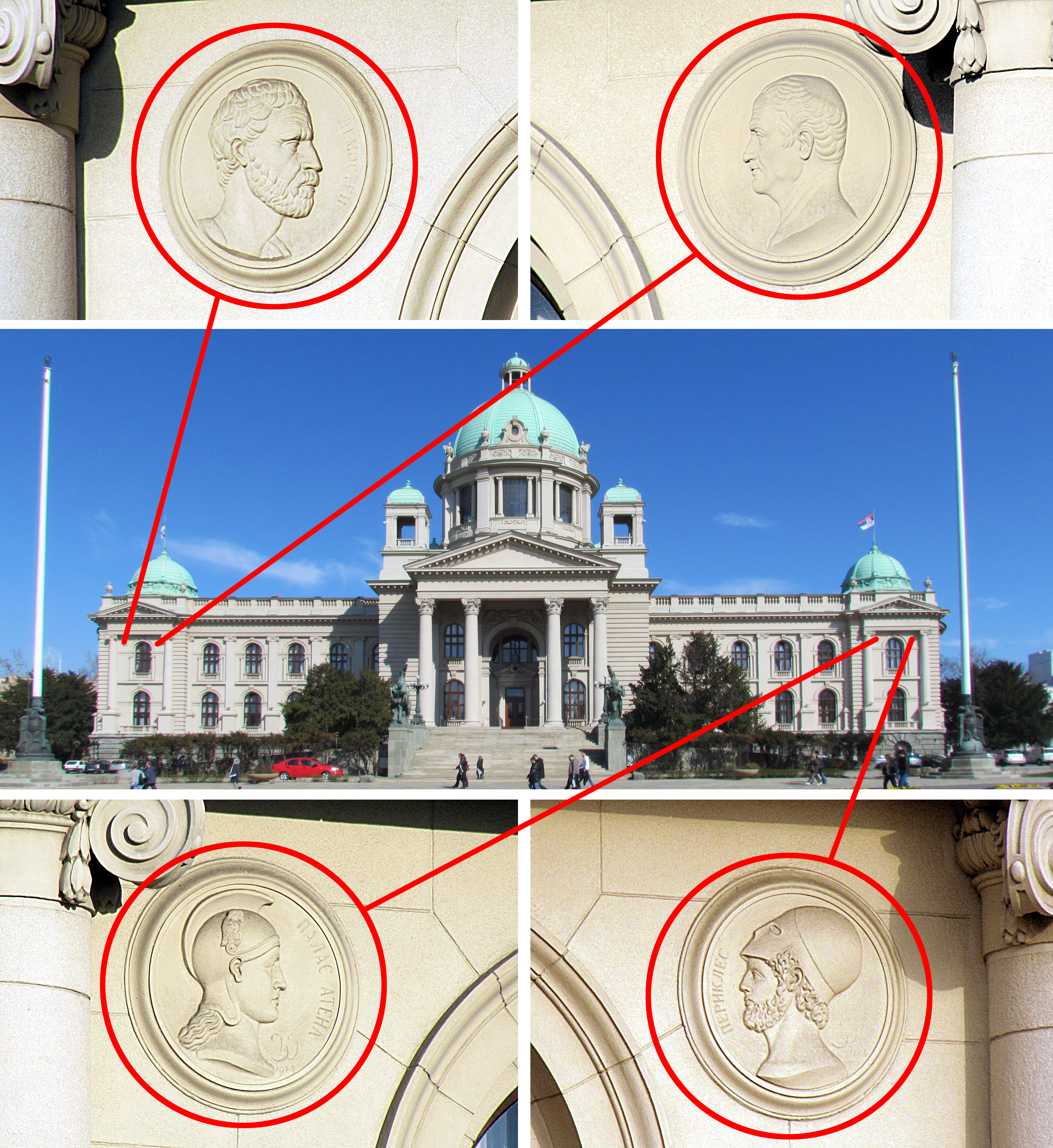
Facade medallions (from left: Demosthenes, Cicero, Pallas Athena, and Pericles), House of the National Assembly of the Republic of Serbia

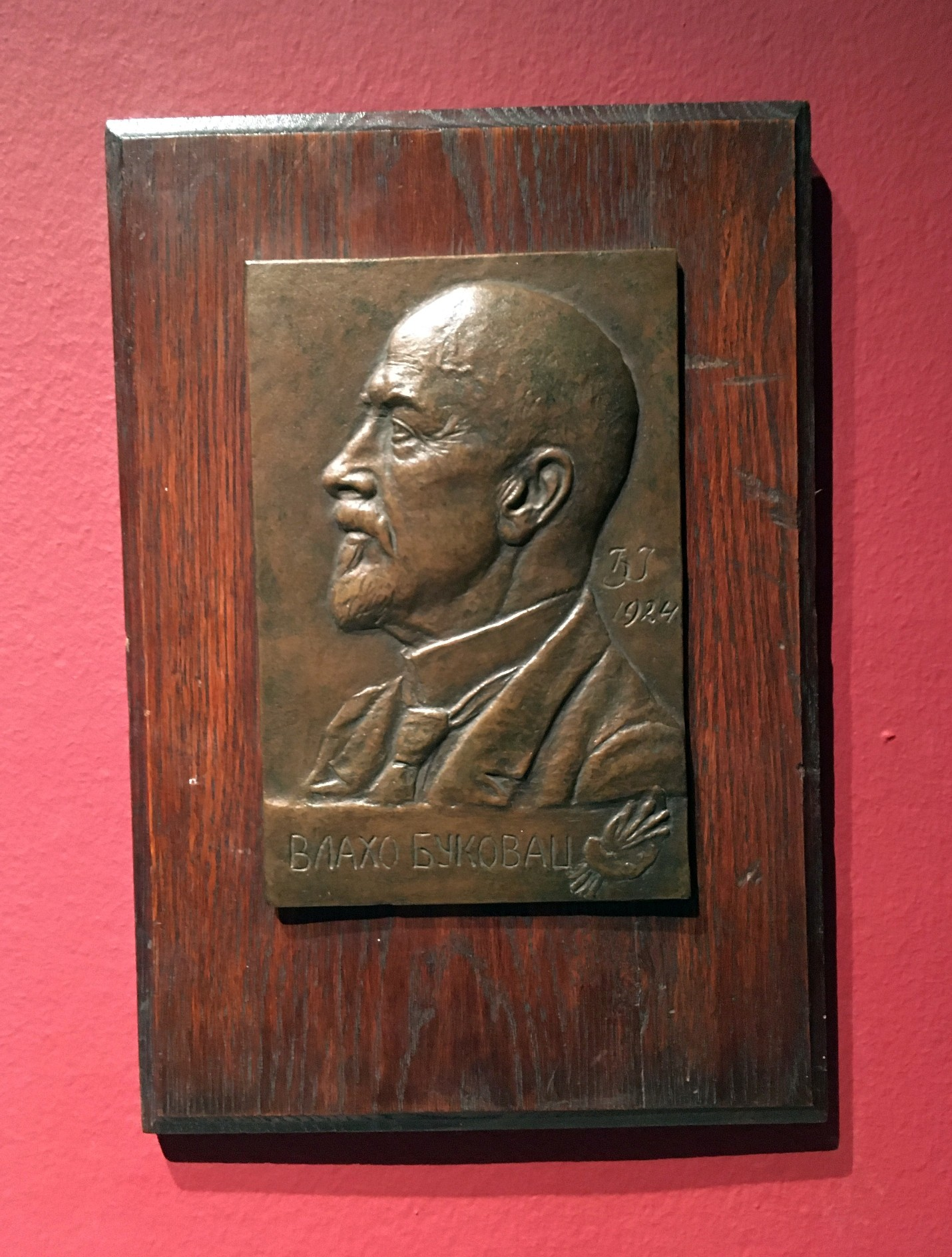
Vlaho Bukovac, 1924

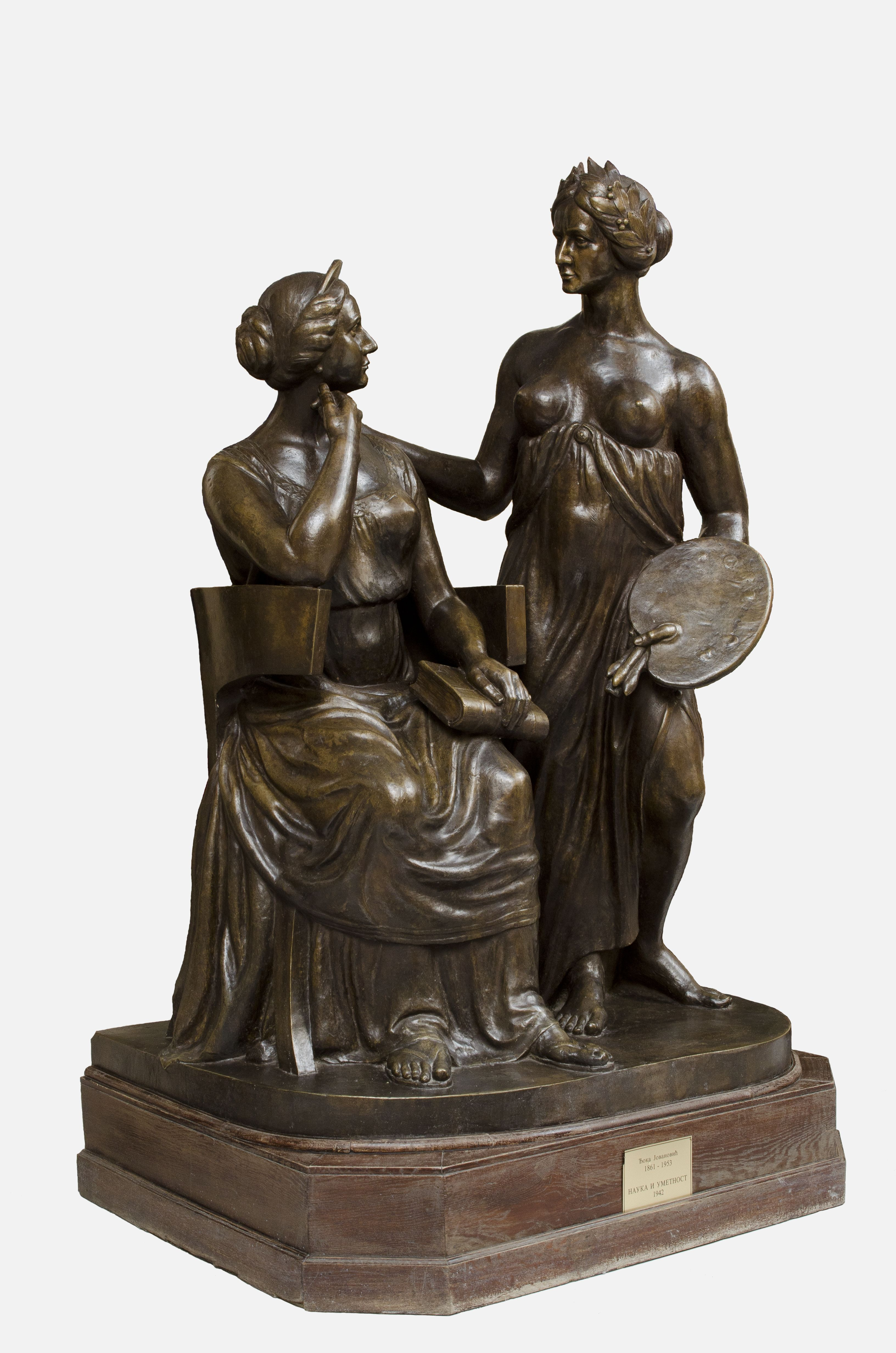
Two muses - science and art, 1942

== See also ==
- Đorđe Jovanović House
- List of painters and sculptors from Serbia

== Literature ==
- Jovanović, Miodrag (2005). Đoka Jovaović. Novi Sad: Galerija Matice srpske, Novi Sad. ISBN 978-86-83603-12-1.
