= Serbian art =

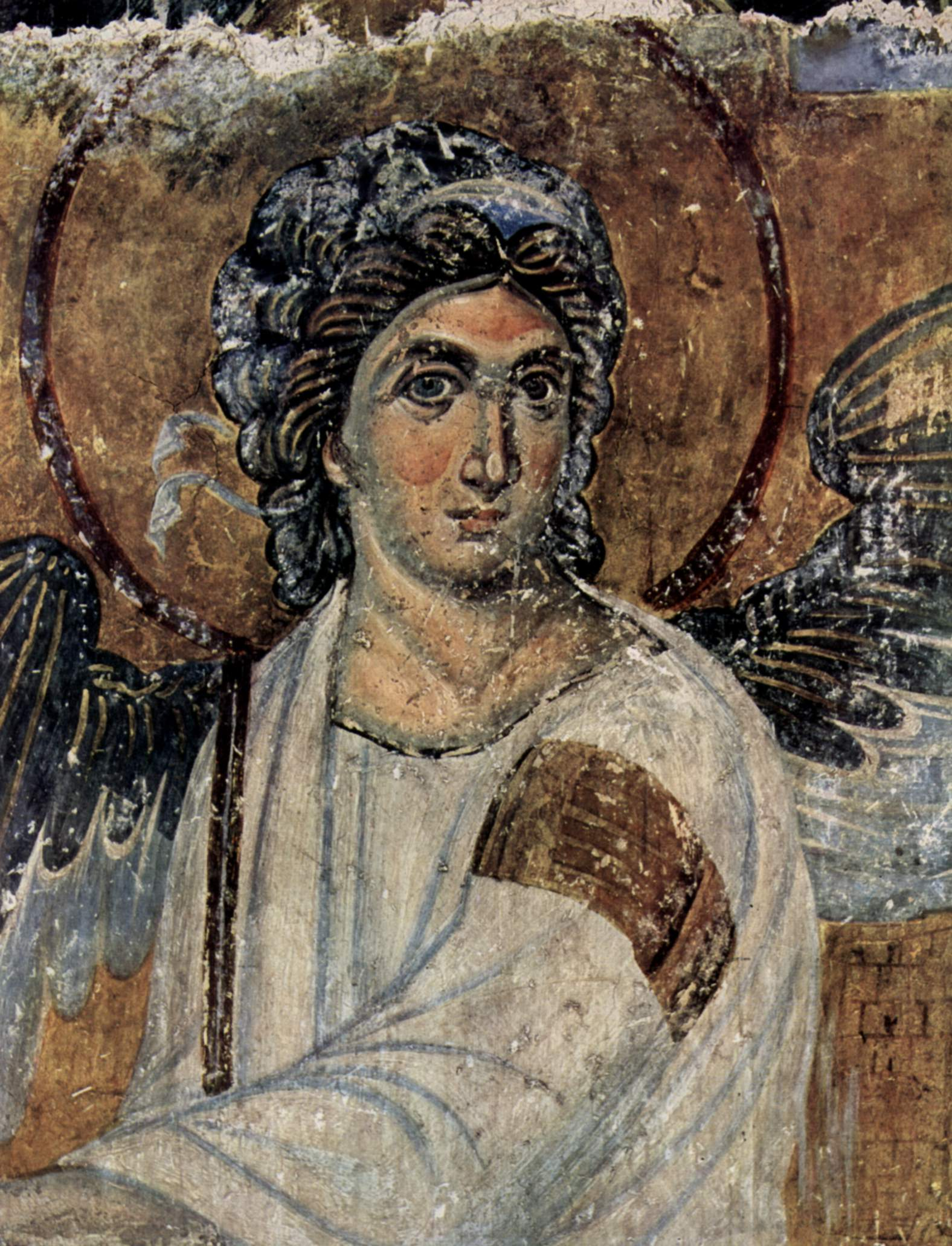
Detail of the White Angel, part of the Myrrhbearers at Christ's tomb fresco from Mileševa Monastery (1235)

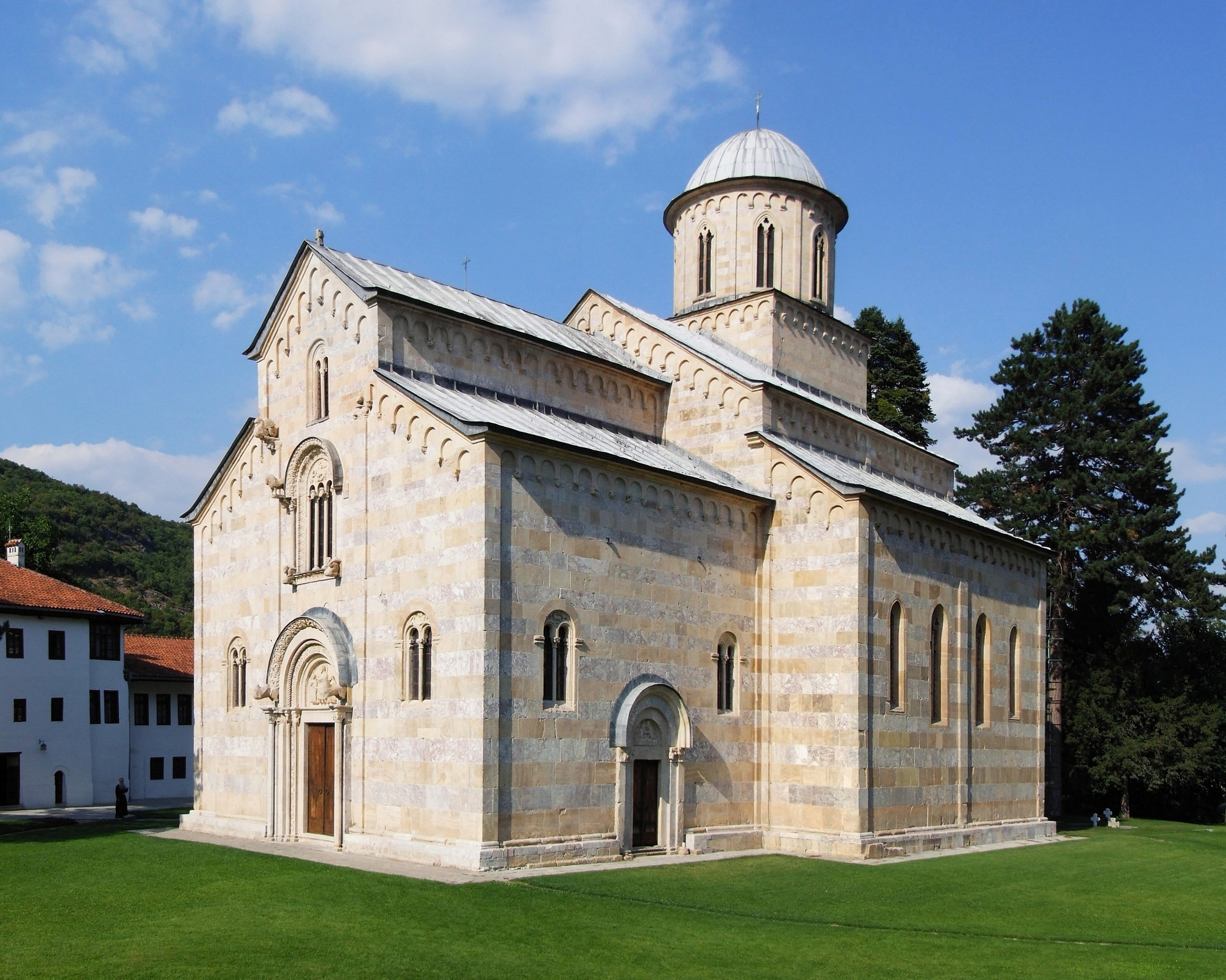
Serbian Orthodox Monastery of Dečani, the 14th century, UNESCO World Heritage Site

Serbian art refers to the visual arts of the Serbs and their nation-state Serbia. The medieval heritage includes Byzantine art, preserved in architecture, frescos and icons of the many Serbian Orthodox monasteries. In the early modern period, Serbian visual arts began to be influenced by Western art, culminating in the Habsburg monarchy in the late 18th century. The beginning of modern Serbian art is placed in the 19th century. Many Serbian monuments and works of art have been lost forever due to various wars and peacetime marginalizations.

== Prehistory ==
Artifacts from Europe's oldest known civilizations have been discovered in Serbia. Archaeological Sites of Exceptional Importance (Serbia) are numerous and have the highest level of state protection under the Law on Cultural Heritage.

Prehistoric sites in Serbia include Lepenski Vir.

== Roman period ==
Geographically the region of modern-day Serbia was always part of the Roman Empire whether it was ruled from Rome or from Byzantium. The Roman ruins are found throughout Southeastern Europe.

== Medieval Serbian art ==
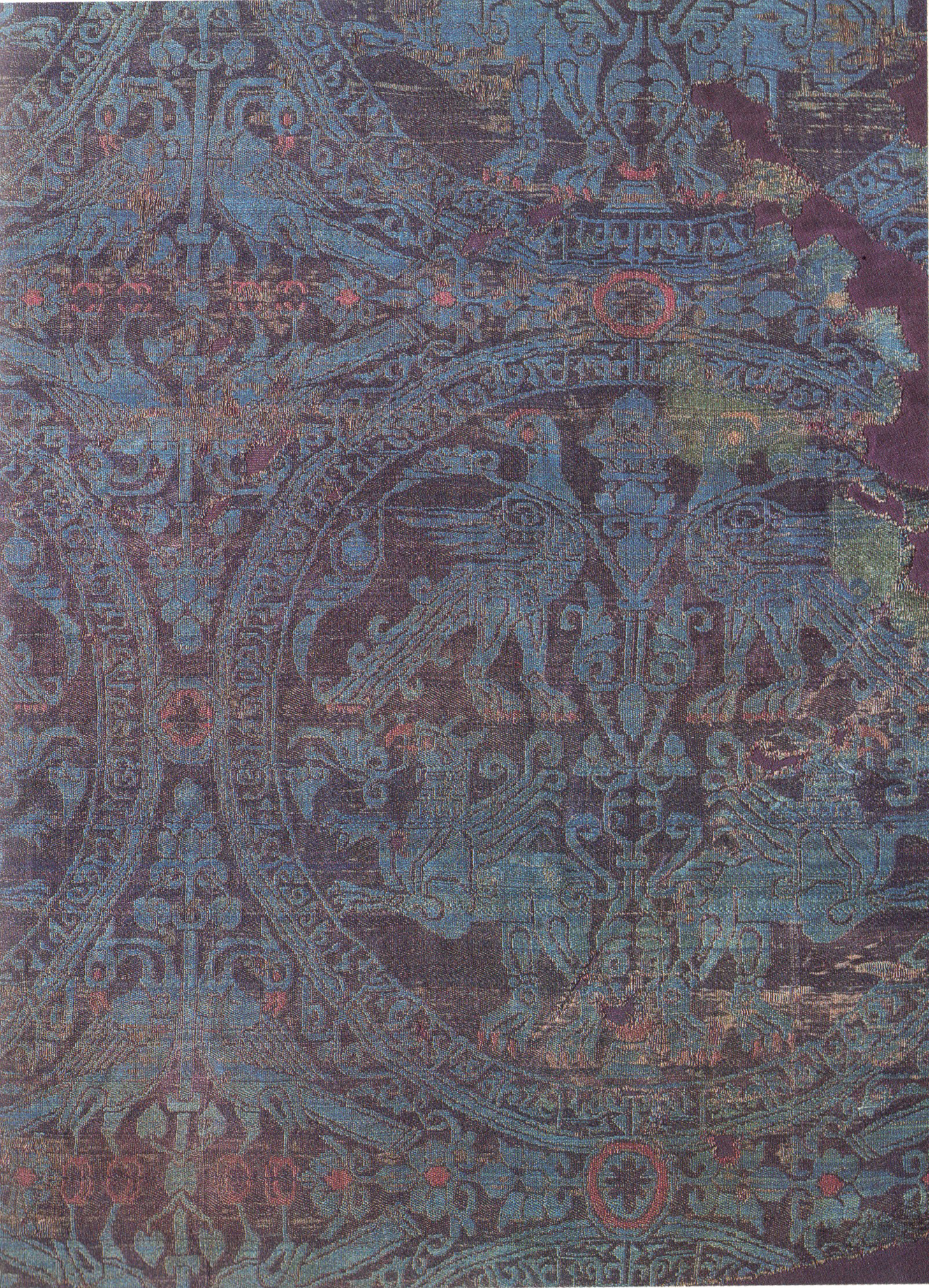
Serbian silk, c. 1330

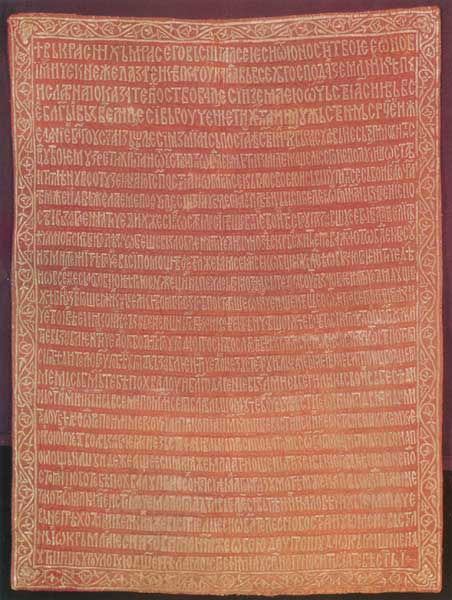
Praise to King Lazar, medieval weaving

Little is known of the lives of the painters, craftsmen (engravers, goldsmiths, woodcarvers), builder/architects of medieval Serbia, of their studies, their schools, and their commissions. However, progress in learning of those topics is gradually being made.

But in the course of centuries experience in painting frescoes, miniatures, icons and the iconostasis, there undoubtedly arose arts and crafts workshops where a younger generation of painters and skilled craftsmen could learn the techniques of the masters.

Church architecture developed under the patronage of the medieval Serbian state. The most distinctive piece of medieval Serbian architecture was the Studenica monastery founded by Stefan Nemanja, the founder of the Nemanjić dynasty in 1166. This monastery also featured significant works of art including its Byzantine style fresco paintings. Its church also features extensive sculptures based on Psalms and the Dormition of the Theotokos. UNESCO added this monastery to its list of World Cultural Heritage sites in 1986. It was the model for other monasteries at Mileševa, Sopoćani and the Visoki Dečani. The influence of Byzantine art became more influential after the capture of Constantinople in 1204 in the Fourth Crusade when many Greek artists fled to Serbia. Their influence can be seen at the Church of the Ascension at Mileševa as well as in the wall paintings at the Church of the Holy Apostles at Peć and at the Sopoćani Monastery. Icons and frescoes also formed a significant part of church art. At that time in Raška, Stefan Vladislav who founded at Mileševa a monastery and a church where three of his court painters -- Demetrius, George and Theodore -- worked on wall painting free from the strict canon law tradition. The influence of Byzantine architecture reached its peak after 1300 including the rebuilding of the Our Lady of Ljeviš (ca. 1306–1307) and St. George at Staro Nagoričane as well as the Gračanica monastery. Church decorative paintings and religious arts and crafts also developed further in the period. The most noteworthy painters at the time were Michael Astrapas and Eutychios (fl. 1294-1317), Grigorije (1333), Jovan Teorijan (fl. 1345-1350), Monk Markarije (fl. 1366-1378) and before them, Deacon Jovan (fl. 1266-1271), Rufin (fl. 1271)

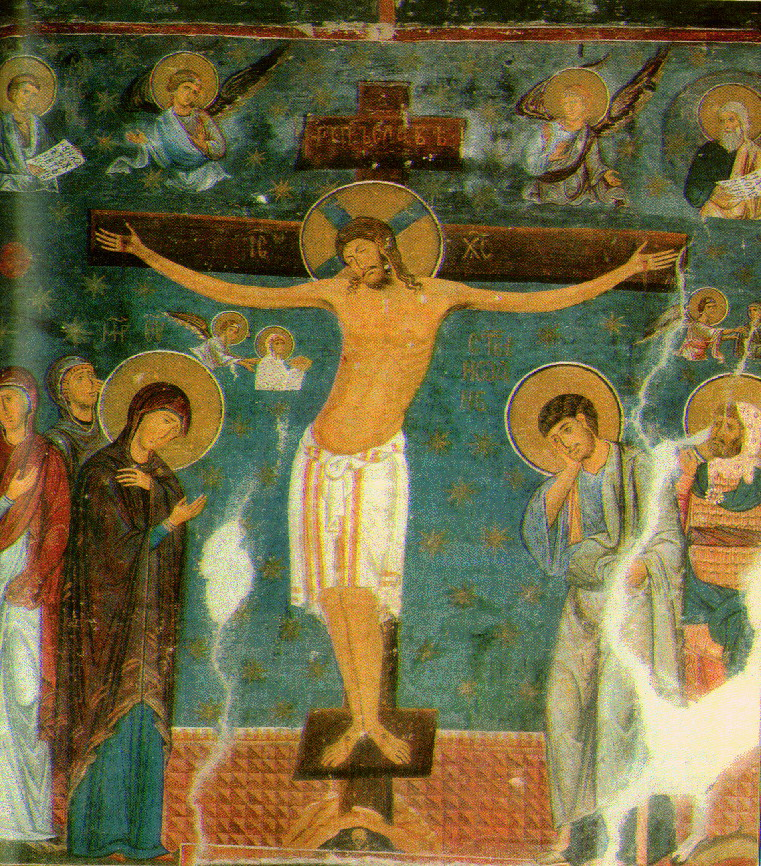
The Crucifixion, fresco in Studenica monastery

Icon of the Holy Virgin Pelagonitissa, dating from 1421, is considered one of the last outstanding achievements of icon painting, a representation of the then still-living Byzantine iconography. Its author Makarije Zograf (1380-1422) worked on the icon in the Church of Transfiguration in the monastery of the village Zrze, near Prilep, and many other Serbian monasteries during the fifteenth century. Makarije Zograf and his brother Metropolitan Jovan Zograf (1380-1422) cared for the monastery endowment until it was transferred to Constantine, the village head (kmet). Also, there was Aleksije (fl. 1350), Hieromonk Grigorije (1380-1420), Monk Joanikije (fl. 1410), but many did not sign their works, but they are not difficult to identify because of their unrivalled quality that cannot be mistaken from another school.

The Visoki Dečani monastery in Metohija was built between 1330 and 1350. Unlike other Serbian monasteries of the period, it was built with Romanesque features by master-builders under the monk Vitus of Kotor. Its frescoes feature 1000 portraits portraying all of the major themes of the New Testament. The cathedral features iconostasis, hegumen's throne and carved royal sarcophagus. In 2004, UNESCO listed the Dečani Monastery on the World Heritage List.

There was a further spate of church building as the Serbian state contracted to the Morava basin in the late 14th century. Prince Stefan Lazarević was a poet and patron of the arts who founded the church at Resava at Morava with the wall paintings having a theme of parables of Christ with the people portrayed wearing feudal Serbian costumes.

Manuscripts were another significant feature of Serbian medieval art. Miroslav's Gospel features lavish calligraphy and miniatures and is a significant artwork as well as a notable work of literature. The Chludov Psalter dating from the 14th century is beautifully decorated and was probably owned by a high-ranking noble. Serbian princes were well known in the 15th century for supporting manuscripts employing scribes and artists to create manuscripts besides icons and frescoes. Lovro Dobričević (1420-1478) of Kotor was a Venetian painter, Roman Catholic by confession, who first started to paint in the Serbian Orthodox Savina Monastery in Zeta and Serbian Despotate (now Montenegro) in the mid-15th century.

Later in 19th century, Serbian medieval art was used as inspiration for notable architect Andrey Damyanov who, between 1835 and 1878, along the Vardar and Morava Valleys and Bosnia, built around 40 churches and other buildings. Adapting to the social demand of its Serbian sponsors, Damyanov combined simultaneously traditional elements of the 15th century Morava school with Occidental baroque elements found North of Sava river.

Thanks are due to field scientist and academic Gabriel Millet who was the first to bring Serbian art to the attention of the West in 1919, along with Serbian-American scientist Michael Pupin, who gathered an international team of scholars and public figures to support the preservation of architectural heritage during and after the Great War. In 1918, Sir Thomas Graham Jackson, in Pupin's "Serbian Orthodox Church" on the medieval Serbian churches, refuted the notion that Serbian art was nothing more than a branch of Byzantine art and showed that Serbian art had an original character of its own.

A large number of artistically worthy icons was made in this period.

=== Fresco paintings ===
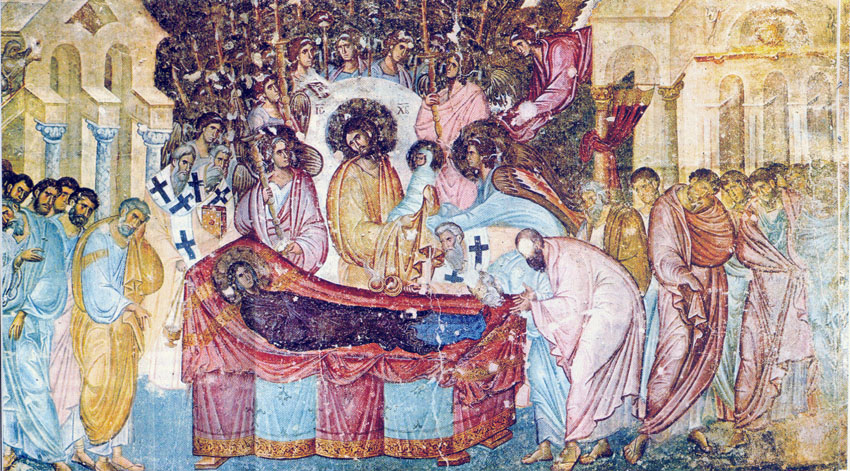
The Dormition of the Virgin in Sopoćani monastery

Orthodox fresco painting represents the peak of Serbian medieval art. Its birth went in line with the creation and development of medieval Serbian state, but unlike Serbian state it didn't cease to exist during the Ottoman occupation. While Serbian architecture has seen mixed influences of both Byzantine and medieval Italian states, fresco and icon painting remained deeply rooted in solely eastern byzantine tradition.

Frescos were being painted under the patronage of Serbian rulers, as the highest form of religious decorative form. Following the political expansion and military growth, the 13th and 14th century are marked as the period when the biggest amount of newly built or existing sanctuaries have been decorated, mostly by unknown artists. Studenica monastery has been built in 1196 under the patronage of Stefan Nemanja, the founder of Nemanjić dynasty, and ever since it enjoyed the care of Stefan's descendants as the archi-model. Its most representative fresco, The Crucifixion, was made twelve years later, in 1208, on the blue background brought into contrast with golden-yellow of Christ's bare crucified body. In the second half of 13th century an unknown artist painted monumental The Dormition of the Virgin in Sopoćani monastery, which remained the supreme achievement of byzantine painting tradition.

However, the most famous Serbian medieval fresco is the Myrrhbearers (or the "White Angel") from the Mileševa monastery, painted in 1235, on the southern wall of the church. It depicts Archangel Gabriel sitting on Christ's grave. The identity of its author is unknown. In the 16th century, the White Angel was over-painted with another fresco, and so was hidden until the 20th century when the fresco was restored. This fresco was sent as a message in the first satellite broadcast signal from Europe to America after the Cuban Missile Crisis, as a symbol of peace and civilization. Later, the same signal, containing the White Angel, was transmitted to space in an attempt to communicate with extraterrestrial life forms.

Another notable mention is the fresco of Serbian queen Simonida, in Gračanica monastery, today located on the disputed territory of Kosovo. Born as Simonis Palaiologina, she was a daughter of the Byzantine Emperor Andronikos II Palaiologos (r. 1282–1328) and Irene of Montferrat, and the fourth wife of Serbian king Stefan Milutin (r. 1282–1321).

== 16th and 17th centuries ==
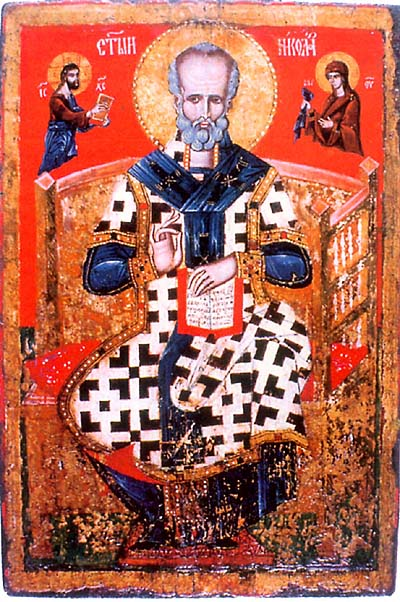
Icon of Saint Nicholas, tempera on wood, by Andrija Raičević, 1641

The Ottoman conquest of Serbia during the 15th century had a negative impact on the visual arts. The Serbs became part of the Rum Millet (Christian community), and were regarded as a lower class (rayah). The Serbian nobility was not integrated into the Ottoman state system, and the Ottoman government abolished the church. As the nobility and church were the main sources of patronage for architects and artists, the early modern period is considered an artistically less productive period in Serbian art. Despite the general trend, notable monuments were built. There was some resumption of artistic endeavor after the restoration of the Serbian Patriarchate in 1557. Zograf Longin (1530-1600) and Georgije Mitrofanović were the leading painters of the late 16th and early 17th century, along with Zograf Jovan, Andrija Raičević, Zograf Radul, Sava Krabulević, Kozma Damjanović, Zograf Dimitrije, Strahinja of Budimlje, Kyr Georgije and Kyr Kozma. Mitrofanović's work on the church at the Morača Monastery is considered one of his best. Among the icon painters working in the Byzantine tradition in Slavonia were Nikola Klisur (mid-17th century) and Ostoja Mrkojević in the late 17th century.

== Baroque (18th century) ==
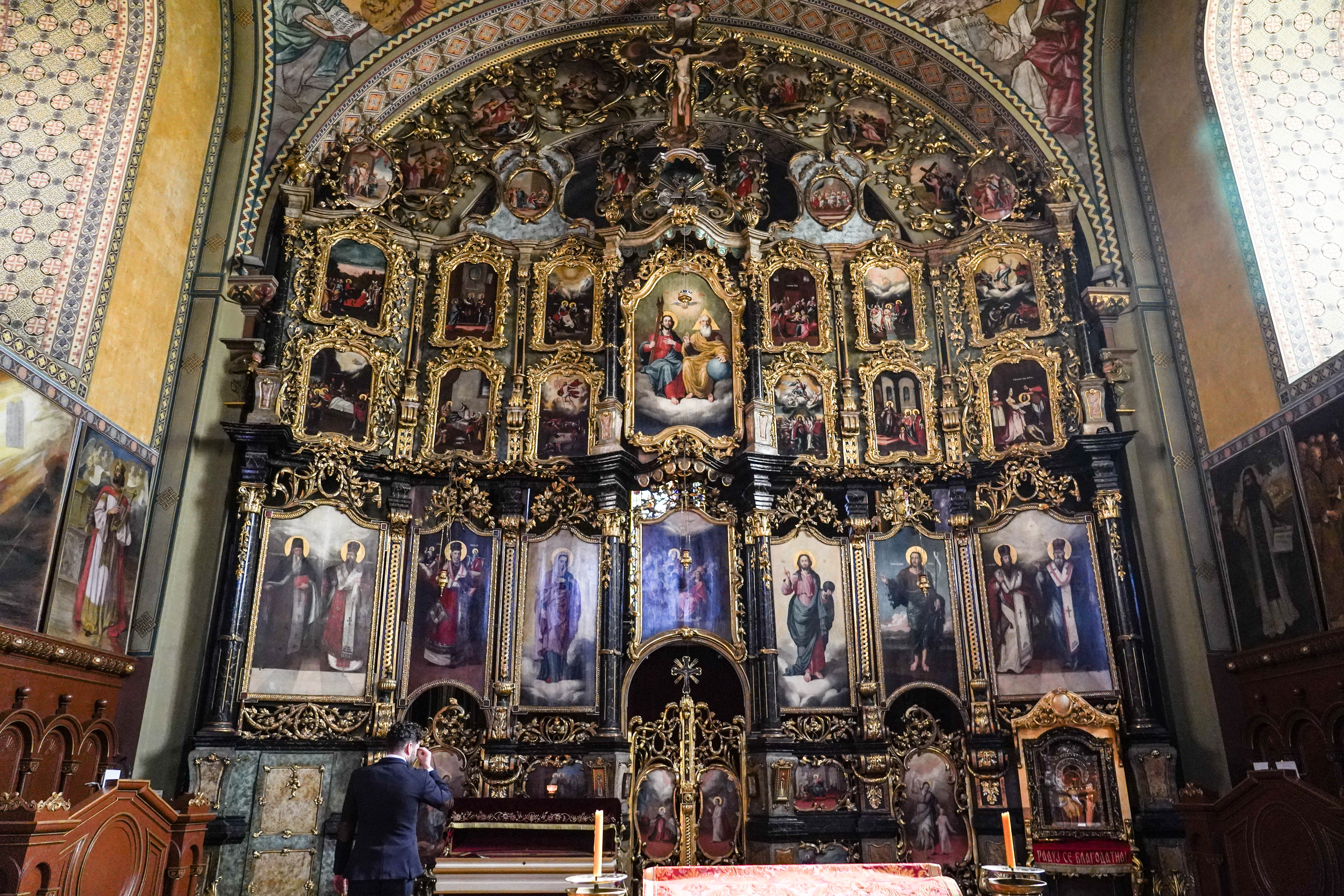
Baroque Iconostasis of the Sremski Karlovci Orthodox Cathedral

Traditional Serbian art was beginning to show some Baroque influences at the end of the 18th century as shown in the works of Nikola Nešković, Teodor Kračun, and Jakov Orfelin. Painting of the early Baroque did not create a homogeneous group of painters. It developed under the Russian-Ukrainian and Southern Balkan basis and the influences that had slowly arrived from Western European art centers. The first generation of Baroque painters nourished on the learnings of the Russian painters Vasilije Romanovich and Jov Vasilijevich, then the trainee of the Kiev Academy of painting, Dimitrije Bačević, Vasa Ostojić, Joakim Marković, Jovan Popović, Amvrosije Janković, Dimitrije Popović, Teodor Stefanov Gologlavac, Hadži-Ruvim Nenadović, and Stefan Tenecki. The work of Balkan icon painters in the Habsburg monarchy throughout the 18th century. Teodor Simonov (born in Moschopolis) worked for the Serbian Orthodox Metropolitanate of Karlovci during the eighth decade of the 18th century. Simonov painted the walls of the church monastery in Stolni Beograd, today's Székesfehérvár in Hungary. The works of Jovan Četirević Grabovan who completed part of his education in Imperial Russia, and returned to the Habsburg monarchy to settle in Osijek in Slavonia where he developed a rich icon-painting activity. The works of others who also came originally from southern parts of the Balkans (once known as Old Serbia) such as Hristofor Žefarović and Janko Halkozović, created in the spirit of the Levant Baroque, relying on the transferred experience of Italian Renaissance art and the Byzantine tradition, which resulted in a distinctive model of Baroque icons. The originator of the more direct rotation on Central European models was Joakim Marković, whose work is linked to the first portraits and Still lifes, and in church painting of historical compositions and heraldic depictions.

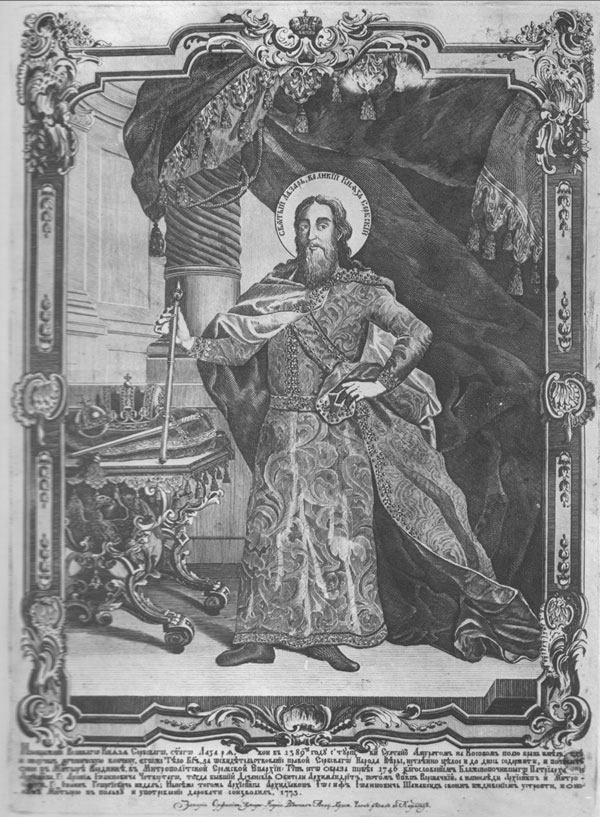
Saint Lazar, Serbian Great Prince, a copperplate by Zaharije Orfelin, 1773

High Baroque art was reflected in the firmer cultural orientation towards Vienna, as well as church and school reforms. The changes are visible in the works of Teodor Kračun who in his work represents a significant step towards understanding the actual Central European art. The retrospective Orthodox heritage confronted the emphasized emotionality and the movement as a fundamental element of artistic expression. Scenes are placed in the real world, Christ and Mary are depicted according to the rules of the secular ruler iconography and rely on graphic templates from popular illustrated Bibles. The group of representatives of the High Baroque include Mojsije Subotić, Grigorije Davidović-Obšić, Grigorije Jezdimirović and Lazar Serdanović.

The emergence and development of Late Baroque painting had been determined by the cultural and political changes of the time of Joseph II. Conceptual changes in the era of enlightened and learned man - the Enlightenment - marked the last decade of the 18th century. The learned artist, traveling the European capitals of Art, accepts and implements the ideas of the Enlightenment reforms. Among the artists who took Serbian painting of Central European Late Baroque formulation, Jakov Orfelin and Teodor Ilić Češljar stand out. They are joined by master woodcarvers Marko Gavrilović and his sons, Arsenije and Aksentije Marković and Marko Vujatović. Neoclassicism as the style of the new era, based on the ideas of the Enlightenment, would not jeopardize the ruling Late Baroque conception in the first decades of the next century. Such a sequence is identified in the works of painters Stefan Gavrilović, Jovan Isailović Sr., Georgije Mišković and Mihajlo Živković.

Among the important painters were Nikola Nešković, Teodor Kračun, Teodor Ilić Češljar, Pavel Đurković, Dimitrije Bačević, Georgije Bakalović, Stefan Gavrilović, Jovan Četirević Grabovan, Jovan Pačić, Jovan Stergević and others.

== 19th-century painting and drawing ==
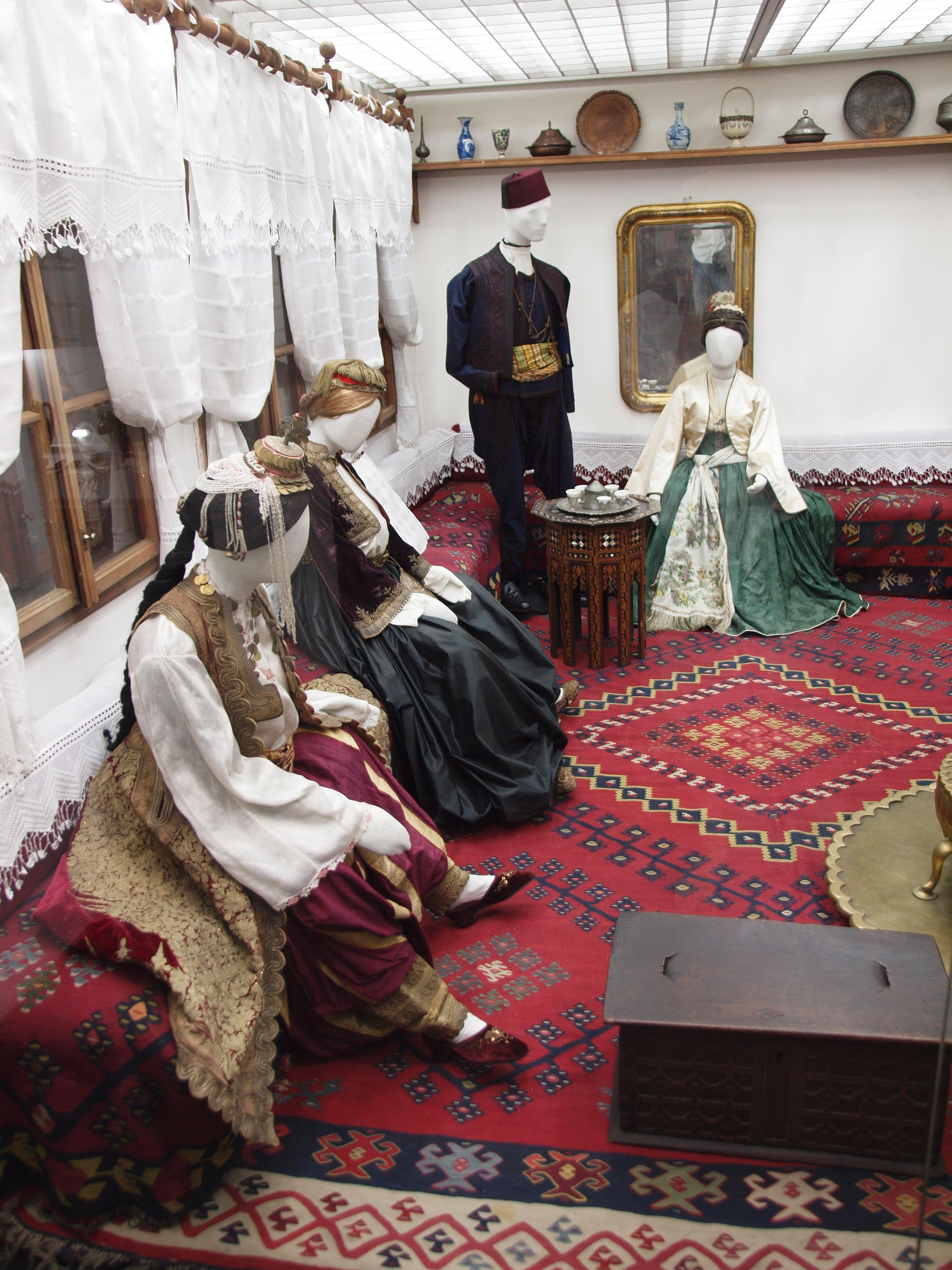
Pirot kilim and traditional Serbian costumes,Ethnographic Museum collection

Religious art

Printed magazines with engravings became a popular method of communicating through art, of both religious and irreligious themes. The printing of engravings of figures of prominent Serbian rulers fitted in the ideas of continuity of Serbian statehood. Monasteries on Fruška Gora and other ones in the Metropolitanate of Karlovci issued engraved magazines in which protector saints with monasteries were represented. Graphical arts of the 18th century were the first-class documents of the appearance and condition of monastery buildings before photographs. In the last decades of the 18th century, the written word suppressed visual arts as the main communication activity in religious magazines, with graphical arts becoming more and more used in illustrated books.

Graphical arts

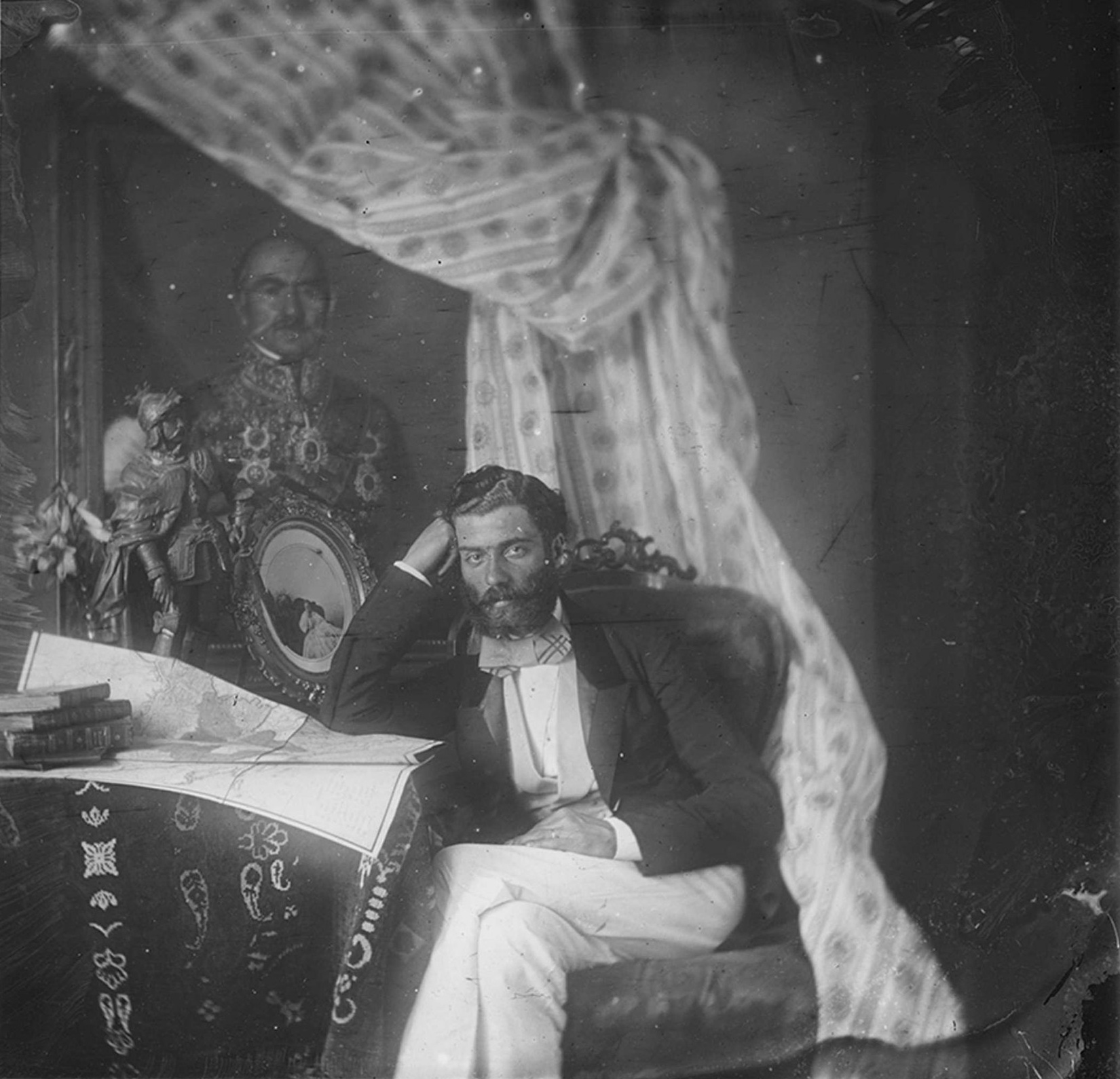
Photography of Prince Mihailo Obrenović by Anastas Jovanović

In the first decades of the 19th century a new graphic technique of lithography experience a real boom in the countries of Western Europe. Serbian artists gradually introduced it to the history of national arts in the 19th century. In contrast to modest attempts of scarce individuals, lithography becomes an important branch of Serbian art only with the emergence of Anastas Jovanović. Independent printed magazines on religious themes that prevailed in the 18th century became scarcer in the 19th century, only accounting for a part of the graphic production. As a medium very suitable for spreading political ideas, lithography dominates with national-historical themes. Sketch portraits and templates for lithography were dealt with by many Serbian painters: Jovan Isailović Jr., Jovan Popović, Uroš Knežević, Pavle Simić, Pavle Čortanović, Adam Stefanović, Steva Todorović, Đorđe Krstić, while being technically performed in Pest and Vienna by various lithographers. At the end of the 19th century, popular oleographs appear, as the first reproduction of popular works, most often with motifs from folklife and depictions of historical figures and events.

Neoclassicism

Under the influence of the ides of Enlightenment and Rationalism, at the end of the 18th and beginning of 19th century, Serbian art came to leave baroque pictorial poetics and acceptance of the aesthetic ideals of the Vienna Academy of Fine Arts, characterized by eclecticism of different stylistic expressions, of the late baroque to neo-classical. In addition to religious painting, which was still dominant, the portrait gains increasing importance. Portraits complete the picture of the new society created in that time and point to the idea of a permanent memory of individuals within the family or the wider community. The gallery of characters, in addition to church prelates and priests, senior officers, significant places is taken by eminent members of civil society from the first decades of the 19th century: lawyers, university professors, writers, wealthy merchants, and their wives, the status shown by marked clothing and jewelry. Stylistic features of paintings of that era: a balanced composition, precise modelling, rigorous academic drawing, colour of the reduced register, expressed in the works of Arsenije Teodorović, Pavel Đurković, Georgije Bakalović, Jeftimije Popović, Nikola Aleksić, Konstantin Danil, Jovan Isailović Jr., Katarina Ivanović, Dimitrije Avramović, and others.

Biedermeier

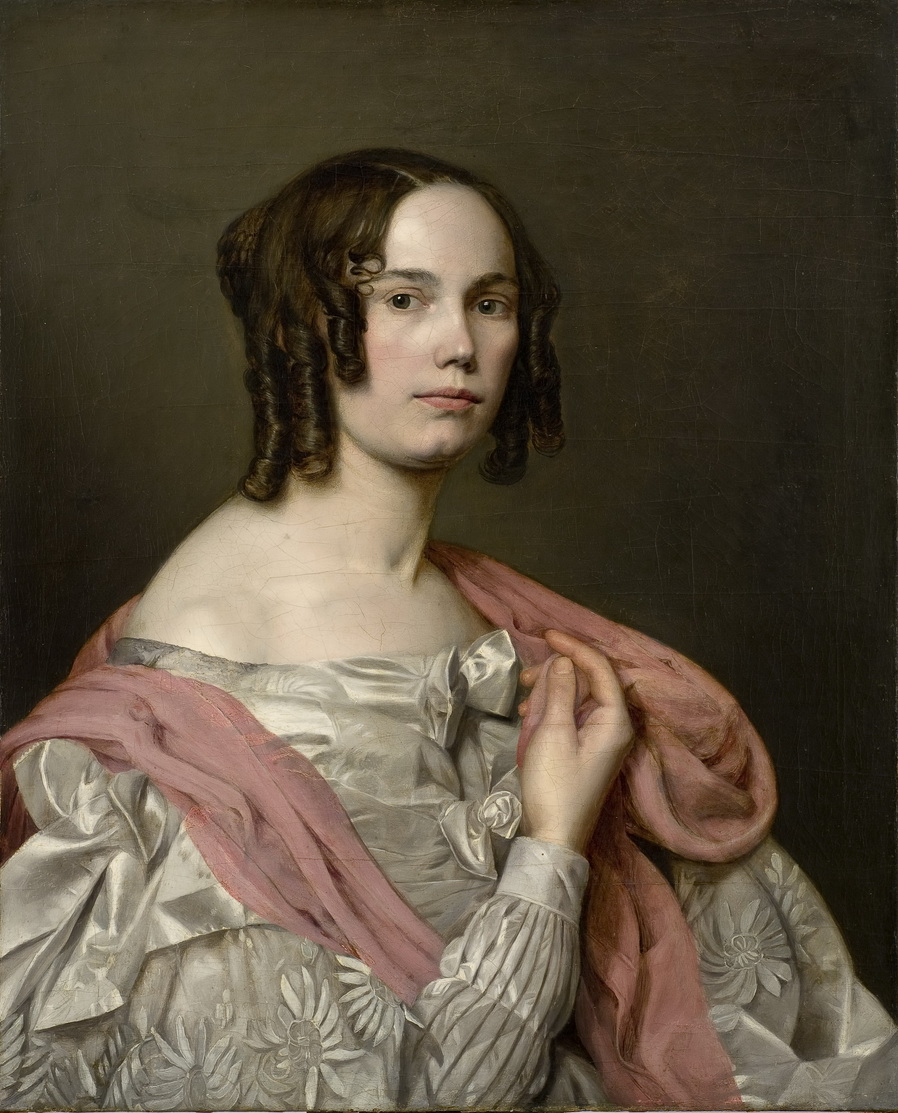
Self-portrait by Katarina Ivanović, National Museum of Serbia

In the 1830s the Serbian art scene is added by a generation of painters who transferred Biedermeier and Nazarene art programs from Central Europe. As a stylistic expression that deeply permeated the Serbian art at that time, Biedermeier was most suitable for the wide layers of citizens that concerned about themselves, their family and home. In the changed social circumstance in which the middle class had become the bearer of social changes, the family becomes the basic unit of modern society and the main scene of private life. Awareness of family is confirmed and visualized in family portraits, in groups or of some of its members. Family portraits depict the social status of the family, but at the same time, they have a private character and are part of a narrow family cult. In addition to portraits, Biedermeier painting is also focused on the Genre art and Still life. The most important representatives of the Biedermeier expression in Serbian painting are Konstantin Danil, Katarina Ivanović, Dimitrije Avramović and Nikola Aleksić.

Romanticism

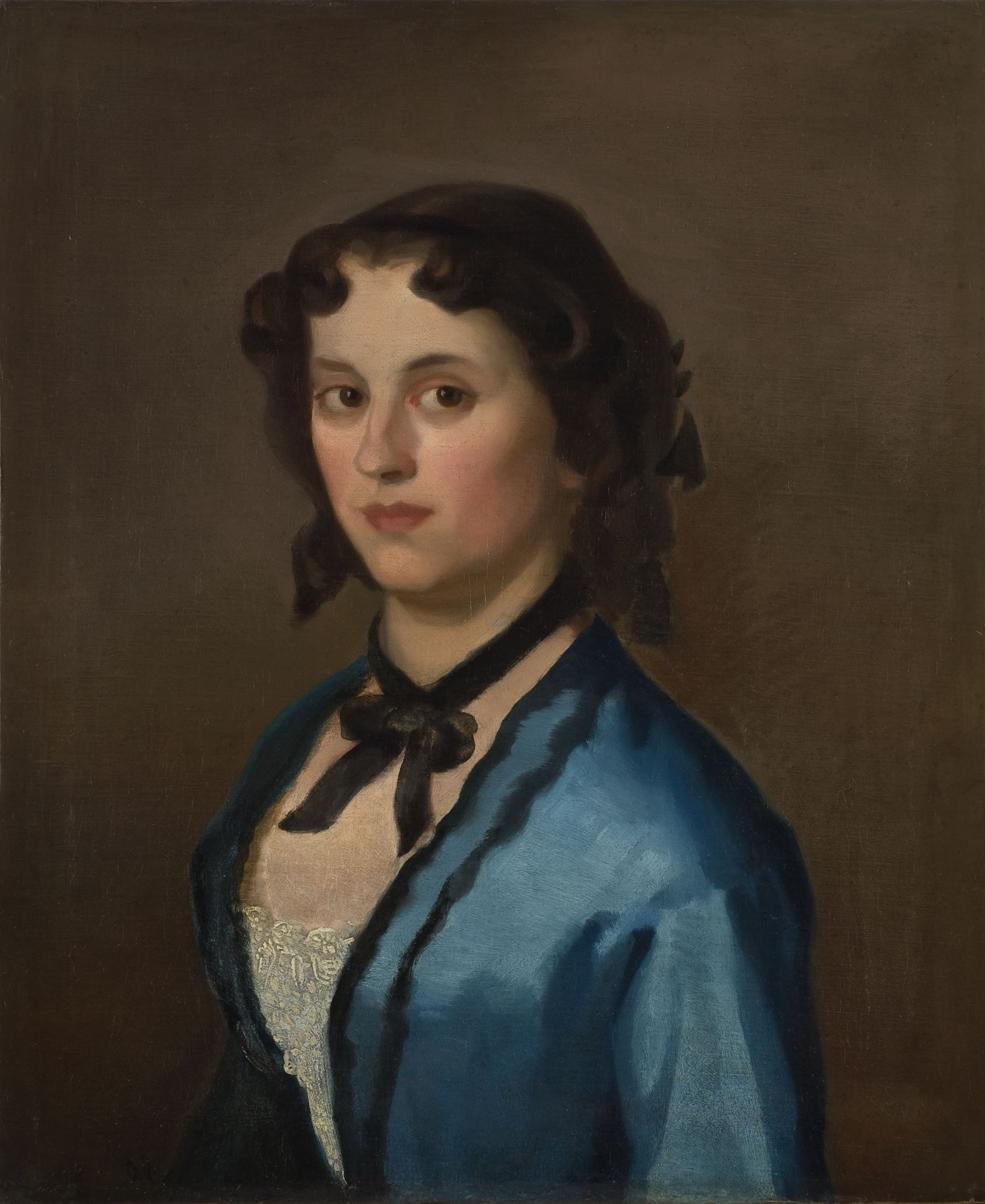
Girl in Blue, by Romantic artist Đura Jakšić

In the mid-19th century Serbian artistic creativity was marked with the reception of content and design of civil works (Biedermeier), but at the same time the development of a program of historicism. For the penetration of Romanticist conceptions, education and stays of Serbian painters in Vienna and Munich, as well as trips to Italy, were crucial. Social and political conditions contributed to the Romantic expression in Serbian art accomplishing its highest achievements in the late 1860s and beginning of 1870s. In stylistic and thematic view, Romanticism brought notable innovations: greater freedom of strokes and composition, warm colours complemented by the play of light and shadow. Most Serbian artists of that period reflected national-historical content in painting compositions, however, the client needs kept iconography and portrait painting popular. Some examples of notable Romanticist painters include Katarina Ivanović (1811–1882), Đura Jakšić (1832–1878), Pavle Simić (1818–1876), Novak Radonić (1826–1890), Aksentije Marodić, Đura Jakšić, Steva Todorović (1832–1925) and the globe-trotting son of Sava Petrović, Pavel Petrović whose famous work is found in Lima, Peru.

Historicism

The Proclamation of Dušan's Law Codex by Paja Jovanović

In accordance with the general ideas of Historicism, as the dominant characteristics of the culture of the 19th century in the European context, the top role in the process of constituting national identity was held by events and figures from national history. They represented a representative of the golden age of the nation, which in Serbian culture of the 19th century was equated with the period of the rule of the Nemanjić dynasty. The idealization of a glorious past, regardless of whether it was based on real facts or myth, was the main tool in the constitution and the homogenization of the nation. This idealized past was directly at the service of the glorification of the present, which emphasized the idea of rebuilding the former Serbian glory. These ideas are directly reflected in the visual art of the epoch - historical compositions, but also patriotic scenes that illustrate the events of the recent past are gaining more and more importance. They praise the nation through the idealization of events and personalities, becoming at the same time engaged means of communication with the aim to awaken national and patriotic feelings. Some examples of notable Historicist painters include Đura Jakšić (1832–1878) and Pavle Simić (1818–1876). The most productive period of visual arts made following the trends of Historicism in Serbian art was 1848—1878.

Academicism

In the last decades of the 19th century, Serbian painters began to stay at Munich as a center of education and its Academy of Fine Arts, which compared to the Viennese, was more avant garde and progressive. However, the larger number of them remained faithful to the Vienna Academy where the education system was still based on constitutional education, traditional practices, and technical skills. The highest level of Academicism in Serbian painting of the late 19th century are portraits of Paja Jovanović (1859–1957) and Uroš Predić (1857–1953).

Orientalism

The Wounded Montenegrin by Paja Jovanović won the first-place prize at the Academy of Fine Arts' annual art exhibition in Vienna in 1882.

Orientalism indicates interest in Oriental scenes in the visual arts of the 19th century. Napoleon's campaign in Egypt, the conquest of Algeria, as well as travel books and other literary descriptions, encouraged the enthusiasm and imagination of artists. Islamic countries of the Arabian Peninsula and North Africa had become the preferred travel destination for many artists. Scenes of squares, bazaars, harem and various folklore events entered European painting. Orientalism rarely had a purely documentary character and more often depicted the enthusiasm of Europeans for beauty, vividness, and allure of the unknown and exotic world. The wild nature and unusual customs, combined with gorgeous colours and light, had become a great inspiration to European artists. During a long period of education, Paja Jovanović, along with classes at the Vienna Academy of Fine Arts, attended the School of historical painting of Leopold Müller, famous for its oriental motifs. There is no doubt that Miller's crucial lessons determined his painting preference. Noting the increased interest of Europe to the events in the Balkans, he travelled during the holidays to Albania, Montenegro, Dalmatia, Bosnia and Herzegovina, and Serbia gathering sketches and studies of the life of the Balkan peoples. Precisely these themes brought Paja Jovanović worldwide fame and popularity.

Realism

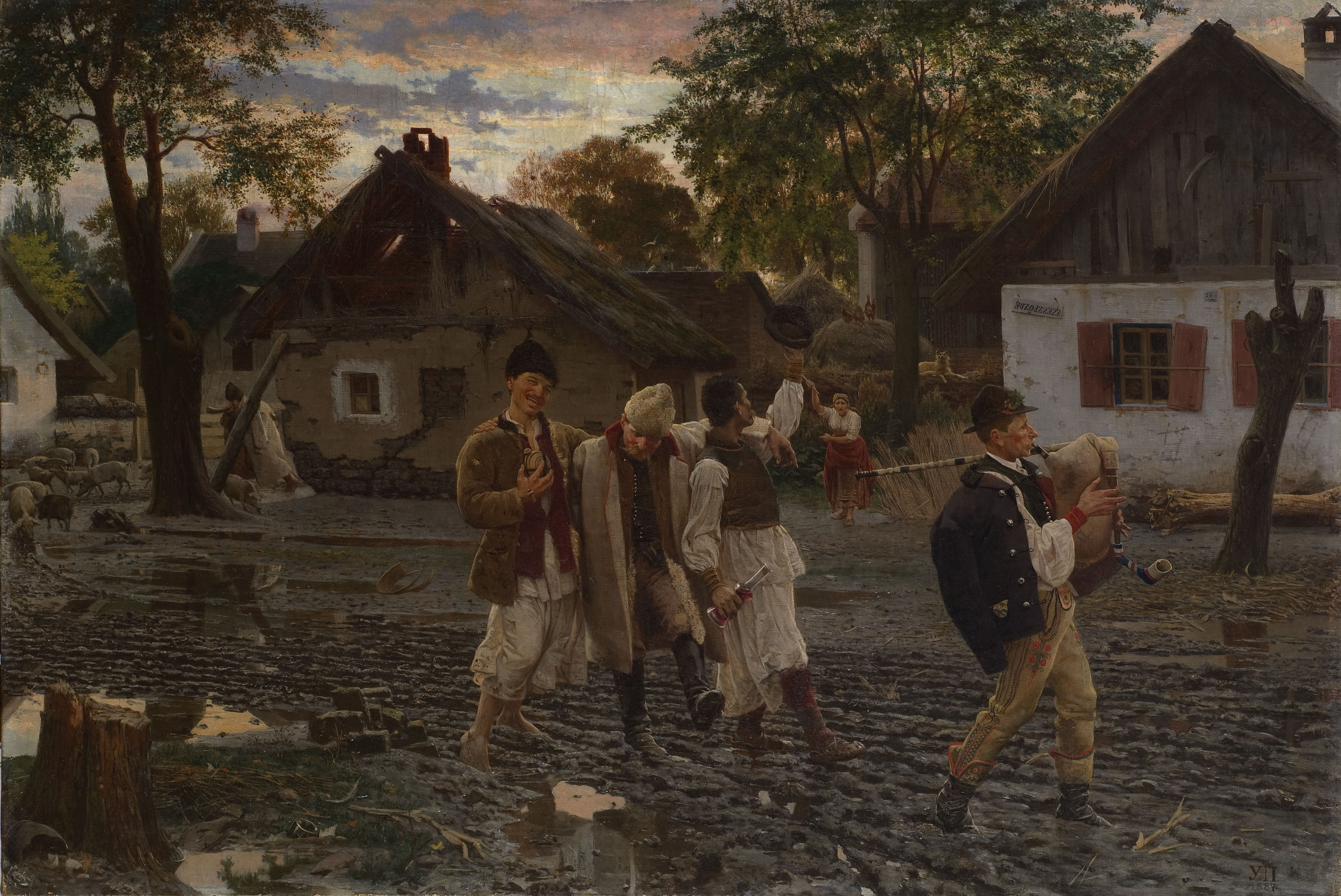
Happy Brothers by realist Uroš Predić

In the last decades of the 19th century, with Serbian painters attending the Academy of Fine Arts in Munich, Realism entered the Serbian art scene. In stylistic view, Realists, succeeding the Romantic agitation, brought calm and order in painting. In Serbian painting Realism never took root in the true sense, in the symbiosis of thematics and techniques. Serbian painters, taught artistically to express in a new form, return to be faced with the difficult solvable problems of adapting the conditions of an economically, socially and culturally underdeveloped environment, which was unwilling to accept new social themes which European Realism advocated. Serbian painters, therefore, continue to paint portraits, religious and historical compositions.

Symbolism

As a formulated artistic phenomenon on a European scale, Symbolism was also present at the Munich art scene, where some Serbian painters were formed. Representatives of Symbolism proclaimed turning of the indirect, associative and suggestive mode of expression. They used mythological symbols, dreams, and imagination as a visual language of the soul. Stevan Aleksić is the most notable representative of the period.

== Applied art and design ==
In terms of periodization, monuments can be divided into those from the period of the Principality, period of the Kingdom of Serbia, the monuments from the period of the Kingdom of Yugoslavia, as well as those built in the Socialist Federal Republic of Yugoslavia and the present-day Republic of Serbia.

Applied art and design through the centuries have evolved in Serbia through crafts. The wealth of forms, the variety of materials with powerful color schemes and ornamentation folk art represented a strong stimulus for the affirmation of applied art, which in the second half of the 19th century, gets its first artists in Serbia. End of the nineteenth and beginning of the twentieth century were marked by the work of individual personalities, each of them made a significant contribution to the development and the history of applied art in Serbia. These were people of different professions and some of them include: Mihailo Valtrović, Vladislav Titelbah, Dragiša Milutinović, Dragutin Inkiostri Medenjak.

== Modern visual arts ==
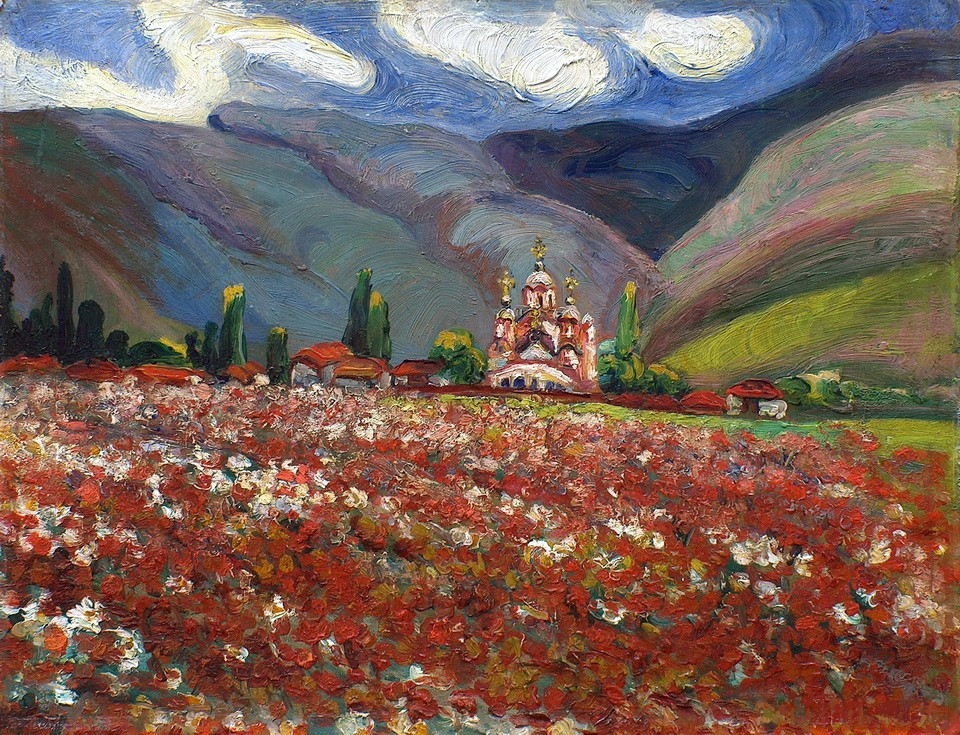
Kosovo peonies (1913) by Nadežda Petrović, part of the collection of the National Museum of Serbia

Kiril Kutlik set up the first school of art in Serbia in 1895. Many of his students went to study in Western Europe, especially France and Germany and brought back avant-garde styles. Nadežda Petrović was influenced by Fauvism while Sava Šumanović worked in Cubism. Other well-known artists of the Avant-Garde movement from 1900 to 1918 were: Anastas Bocarić, Steva Todorović, Paja Jovanović, Marko Murat, Beta Vukanović, Đorđe Krstić, Paško Vučetić, Leon Koen, Svetislav Jovanović, Živko Jugović, Vasa Pomorišac, Adam Stefanović and others.

After World War I, the Belgrade School of Painting developed in the capital with some members such as Milan Konjović working in a Fauvist manner, while others such as Marko Čelebonović working in a style called Intimisme based on the use of colours.

Some artists chose to emigrate from the Serbia and the Yugoslavia. Dragoslav Stoyanovitch (1891-1978) took part in the heyday of poster art in Paris in 1910 while Yovan Radenkovitch (1901–1979) left Belgrade for Paris in the 1930s. Radenkovitch befriended Matisse and Vlaminck and adopted a style inspired by Fauvism, before eventually leaving Europe to work in New York and settled in Waterbury, Connecticut, where several of his paintings are still kept in Mattatuck Museum.Stoyanovitch was one of the early poster designers for Gaumont and continued with his prolific painting career long after. His war poster, created in 1916, entitled "Filming with the Troops" hangs at the Imperial War Museum in London, and others are at the Gaumont archives.

Zenitism was an avant-garde art movement in Yugoslavia that lasted from 1921 until 1926.

Socrealism was the dominant school after World War II with the rise to power of the Communist Party of Yugoslavia under Josip Broz Tito. However, that period did not last long – during the 1960s, Serbian artists started to break free from the constraints of the Communists led by figures such as Petar Lubarda and Milo Milunović. The Mediala group featuring Vladimir Veličković was formed in the 1970s to promote Surrealist figurative painting. Serbian art was split between those basing their works on the traditions of Serbian work such as frescoes and iconography and those exploring international styles.

Naïve art became prominent in the second half of the 20th century, with many notable artists coming from Vojvodina province. Serbian naïve art painters include Dušan Jevtović and Milosav Jovanović.

The first part of 21st century, with young artists like Jovanka Sanijenovic or Simonida Rajčević, marks a predominance of a figurative art linked to realism – a realism "where everything is real and nothing is real – considering contemporary time as needing a return to what is real and concrete, and at the same time social and existential". The Human Rights Logo was created by Serbian graphic designer Predrag Stakić.

== Contemporary art ==
At the beginning of the 1980s in Belgrade was established movement "New Image" painting with Milovan Destil Marković and Vlasta Volcano Mikić (Žestoki), later followed by (Alter imago group) Nada Alavanja, Tahir Lušić, Vladimir Nikolić and later Mileta Prodanović.

== Performance art ==
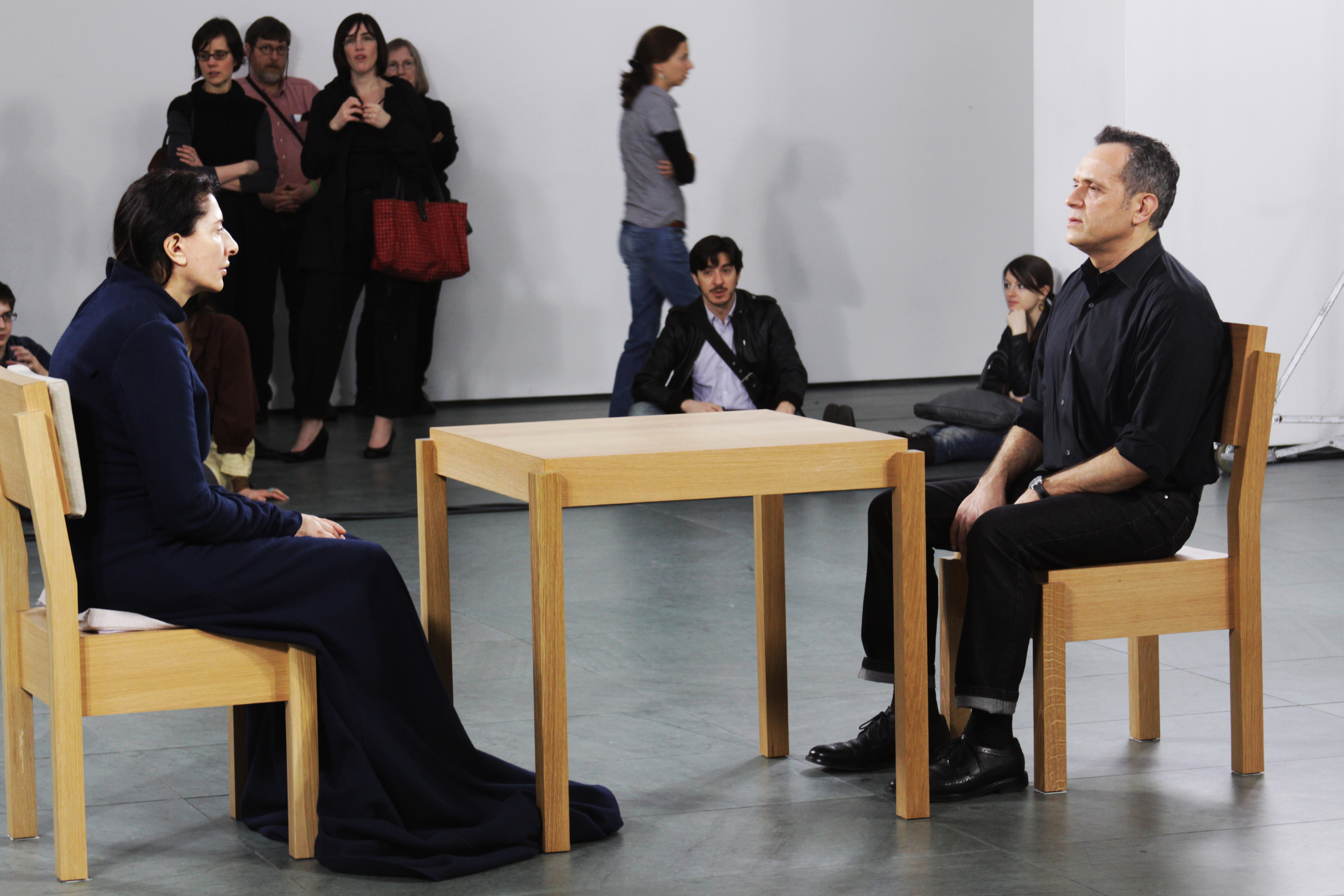
Marina Abramović performed "The Artist Is Present" at the Museum of Modern Art, in 2010.

Maga Magazinović, philosopher and choreographer, was one of the most important figures of contemporary physical practice in Serbia before the Second World War. The emancipation of the body in her work was realized through the application of gymnastics, dance and physical education. During the 1960s and 1970s history of the contemporary dance developed in the framework of performance art, body art and happenings. On the status of the body can meditate in the works of Marina Abramović and Katalin Ladik. The performance art of the eighties was marked by a specific attitude toward ideology. This attitude is manifested in the work within the context of using utopian socialist iconography. During the '90s performance art was focused on the fight against the regime.

Marina Abramović is the most prominent Serbian performance artist. Active for over three decades, she has been described as the "grandmother of performance art." She pioneered a new notion of identity by bringing in the participation of her observers. Her art focuses on the theme of “confronting pain, blood, and physical limits of the body,” while relying on the extent of these discomforts based on the actions of her audience members.

Another performance artists include Gabrijel Savić Ra, Nela Antonović, Lidija Antonović, Predrag Radovančević.

== See also ==
- Serbian architectural styles
