= Nešković =

Nešković (Cyrillic script: Нешковић) is a Serbian surname. It may refer to:

- Blagoje Nešković (1907–1984), Yugoslav partisan and politician
- Đorđe Nešković (born 1991), Serbian curler
- Nikola Nešković (c.1729–1785), painter
- Wolfgang Nešković (born 1948), German politician
