= Kozma Damjanović =

Serbian icon painter

Kozma Damjanović was a Serbian icon painter of the late Byzantine style living and working in Old Slavonia in the 17th and early 18th century. Damjanović came from Kostajnica. In the collection of icon painting from that period in the Museum of the Serbian Orthodox Church stand out the achievement of Kozma Damjanović along with three other contemporary painters of his (Ostoja Mrkojević, priest Stanoje Popović, and Joakim Marković). His most interesting pieces were three unusual icons of the Holy Trinity that he painted in 1704 and donated them to three villages in Slavonia (now Croatia). Early in the 18th century these icons in the specific geographical and historical context have become the center of jurisdictional disputes between Orthodox and Catholic Churches in northern Croatia.

== See also ==
- List of painters from Serbia
- Serbian art
