= Teodor Stefanov Gologlavac =

Serbian painter

Teodor Stefanov Gologlavac or Teodor Stefanov Valjevac was a Serbian icon painter of the 18th century.

The icons, painted by Teodor Stefanov Gologlavac, are preserved in the gallery of the museum of Sremska Mitrovica. Also, his work can be found in the following monasteries: Manastir Kaona, Manastir Divša, Manastir Privina Glava, and Dvor Srpskopravoslavne zvorničko-tuzlanslanske eparhije.

== See also ==
- List of painters from Serbia
- Serbian art
