= Pavle Simić =

- Born: 1818; Novi Sad, Austrian Empire
- Died: January 17, 1876 (aged 57–58)

Pavle Simić (Novi Sad, Austrian Empire, 1818 – Novi Sad, Austro-Hungarian Empire, 17 January 1876) was one of the most significant artists during the Serbian Romantic era.

== Biography ==
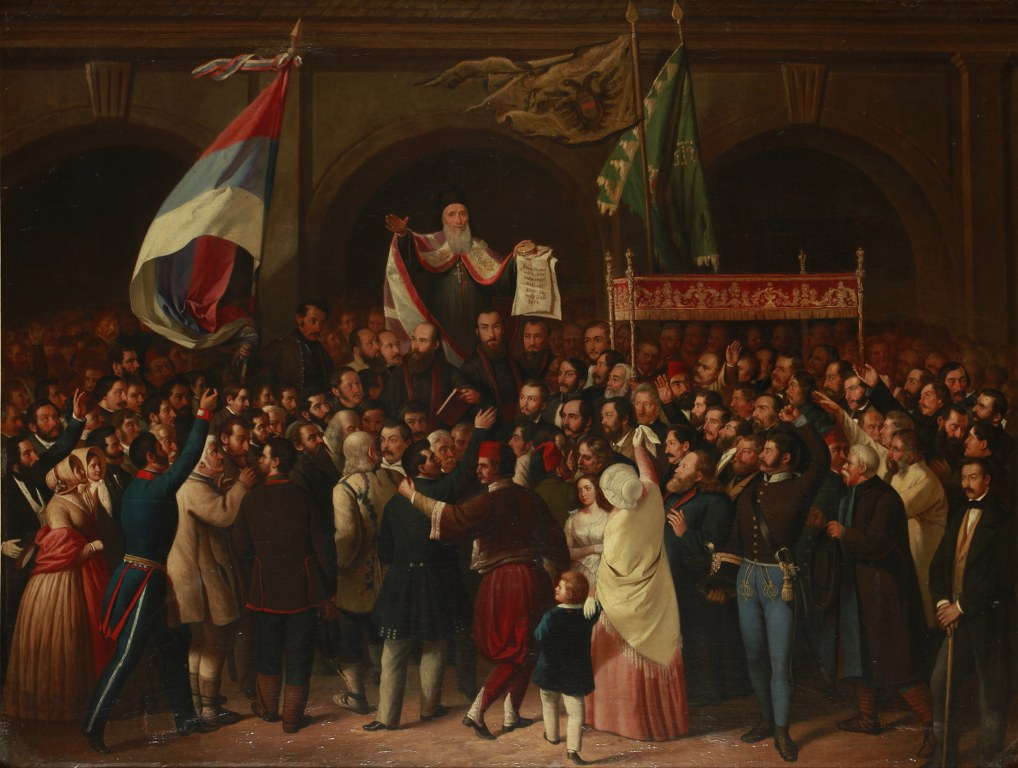
Proclamation of Serbian Vojvodina at the May Assembly in 1848 in Sremski Karlovci. Author: Pavle Simić (1818–1876)

Pavle Simić was born into a family of merchants. Having lost his parents very early, he was taken in by his grandfather who was a priest in Kanjiža.

He completed his secondary education in Sombor and Subotica, then he enrolled in a private art school in Novi Sad and joined the Atelier of Aloiza Castagni, an Italian painter, originally from Mantua. In December 1837 he moved to Vienna and attended the Academy of Fine Arts. There he studied the history of painting until 1841 and received the Gundel Prize.

== Lithography ==
Acutely aware of the ubiquitous role of graphic prints, Simić made many preparatory drawings for graphic works. His "Serbs Gathered round a Guslar Singer" was turned into a lithograph in 1839 by Johann Baptist Clarot. Simić also prepared three drawings for Anastas Jovanović's lithographs. These were the portraits "Vuk Karadžić", "Pavle Karanotvrtković" (both in 1841) and "Georgije Servijski" (1846). He also engaged lithographer Josef Anton Bauer to transfer his picture "May Assembly" in 1848.

== Oeuvres ==
Simić painted mainly icons for the sanctuary screens (iconostases) and portraits of distinguished families of the time.

Among his works are the iconostasis of Kuveždin Monastery (1849) that of the church of Šabac (1853-1856); he worked at Stari Futog (1855), painted the iconostasis of Đurđevo in the region of Šajkaška (1857), that of the church of Saints Peter and Paul of Rumenka and that of the Serbian Orthodox Church of Saint Archangel Michael of Senta (1859).

He still worked in the church of St. Nicholas of Novi Sad (1863) and in the chapel of Platon Atanacković, in the cemetery of Almaš in Novi Sad (1864). Also, his art can be found in the church of St. Nicholas of Bašaid, in the Banat (1864-1866), the church of Orahovica Monastery in Slavonia (1867), the old church of Glina (1866-1868), Church of St. George of Sombor (1870-1873) and Hariševa Chapel of Zemun (1874).

Simić is even better known as a portrait painter. His portraits include Probojčević, Čovek u belom prsluku and Archpriest Matija Nenadović, some of the finest Serbian paintings of the mid-nineteenth century. Among his small portraits are Agripina Grujić and the poet Milica Stojadinović-Srpkinja.

He is also the author of historical compositions, some of which has now disappeared.

== See also ==
- List of painters from Serbia
- Serbian art

== Sources ==
- Vrbaški, Milena, ed. (2011). The Imaginarium of Pavle Simić. The Gallery of Matica Srpska.
