= Ostoja Mrkojević =

Serbian painter

Ostoja Mrkojević (c. 1630 – c. 1699) was a Serbian painter who lived and worked in Slavonia region during the seventeenth century.

== Career ==
He was a contemporary of Serbian painters (zographs) Stanoje Popović, Joakim Marković. Sava Krabulević and Kuzma Damjanović. The last two were colleagues and collaborators on various commissions. Mrkojević painted in the town of Orahovica the icons of Sv. Nikola (Saint Nicholas) and Sv. Lazar Četvorodnevni (Saint Lazarus of the Four Days) and in the village of Široko Selo the icons of Sveti prvomučenik Stefan, arhiđakon (Saint Stephen, also known as Protomartyr and Archdeacon Stephen) and Sv. Ilija (Saint Elijah). The Museum of the Serbian Orthodox Church has a collection of several icons by Ostoja Mrkojević, whose creations belonged to the last quarter of the 17th century.

== See also ==
- List of painters from Serbia
- Serbian art
