= Marko Čelebonović =

Serbian painter (1902–1986)

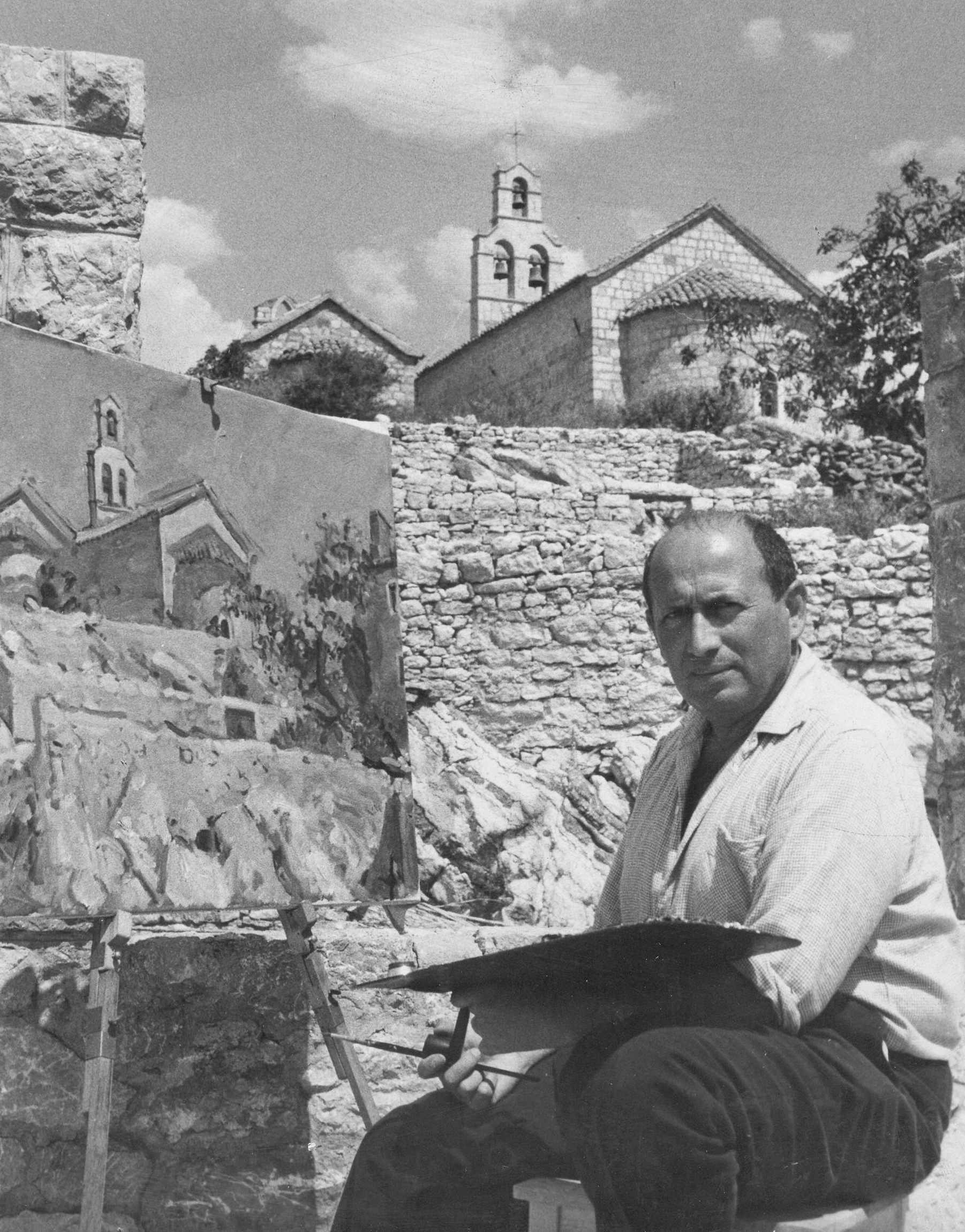
Marko Čelebonović

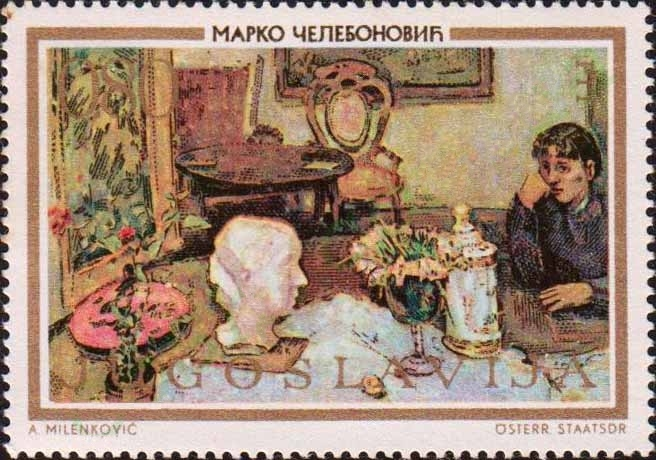
Woman and head by Čelebonović on a 1973 Yugoslav stamp

Marko Čelebonović (Serbian Cyrillic: Марко Челебоновић; 21 November 1902 – 23 June 1986) was a Serbian painter. Čelebonović was one of the most famous Serbian painters of the 20th century.

== Biography ==
Čelebonović was born in Belgrade. He studied law and economics in England and France. His first public exhibition was in Paris in 1925. Before World War II he resided in Saint Tropez. During the years of war, he was a member of the French Resistance. After the war he returned to Yugoslavia and from 1948 to 1960, he was a professor at the Academy of Fine Arts in Belgrade. During this time, he had numerous shows in Paris, Belgrade, Zürich, Geneva, Sarajevo, Skopje and Niš, as well as taking part in a number of collective shows of French painters in France and Italy, and in Yugoslav exhibitions in France, England, Belgium, Italy, the Netherlands, and Brazil. In 1963 he was awarded the "7th July" prize for life's work.

In the spring of 1923, upon his return from England, he appeared at the free Paris school Grande Chaumière in the studio of Antoine Bourdelle, with the intention of devoting himself to sculpture. However, already in summer 1923 he began painting in his own studio and from then on completely devoted himself to painting. In May 1925 he exhibited for the first time in the Salon des Tuileries, and in June he left for Saint Tropez. He worked with many colleagues including, most notably, Édouard Vuillard, Paul Signac, Albert Marquet, André Dunoyer de Segonzac, and Kostia Terechkovitch. For this reason, his art bears many a characteristic of French painting and French tradition. Much of Čelebonović's work is parallel to the tradition exhibited by the 1930 generation of French artists. However, be nonetheless maintained a more Balkan and Oriental tone in his works. Čelebonović's best works are characterized by an Oriental touch, Oriental preference for ripeness and violence of color, such as the meaning of silence and its light, of gentle restrained gesture, the weight of the seated or lying human body. The rational element is present in his painting, but always submerged under authentic affective attitude to life.

Although he spent his years in France, he was always closely attached to the Yugoslav painters who occasionally visited France (Sreten Stojanović, Marino Tartaglia, Petar Lubarda). In 1937 he had his first independent show in Belgrade, and in 1938 he exhibited with the Twelve group. In those years he occasionally visited Yugoslavia, painted in Belgrade and on the Montenegrin Littoral, visited medieval monasteries and was an active presence in the art of the period. In his later years, Celebonovic quoted "My life and work have been determined by my attitude towards Yugoslavia. I have linked the fate of my art with Yugoslav painting. How one grows and attains maturity is a question apart. The influence of French painting upon myself and others is natural enough. After all, who has ever been free from influence?

His decorations and awards include: award for painting at the first memorial of Nadežda Petrović in Čačak, the 7th of July award for life achievement, golden plaque for painting at the third triennial of visual arts in Belgrade, Order of brotherhood and unity, Order of merit to the people, Order of labour and Order of the Republic with golden wreath.

An exhibition featuring his selected works was opened in the Gallery of SANU in early 2019.

== See also ==
- List of painters from Serbia
- Serbian art
