= Živko Jugović =

Serbian painter

Živko Jugović (Čačak, Principality of Serbia, 13 March 1855 ― Belgrade, Kingdom of Serbia, 24 September 1908) was a Serbian painter of religious themes.

== Biography ==
Born on 13 March 1855 in Čačak, Principality of Serbia. He finished his gymnasium in Belgrade before the Metropolitan of Belgrade Mihailo sent him to Imperial Russia for higher education, and to specialize in iconography.

He was first sent to Sergiyev Posad to the Trinity Lavra of St. Sergius (1870), Kiev Pechersk Lavra (1871 to 1873), Moscow School of Painting, Sculpture and Architecture (1873) and later the Department of Education in Serbia made it possible for him to study in Italy at the Accademia di Belle Arti di Venezia (1877-= to 1878), Accademia di Belle Arti di Firenze (1879) and the Academy of Fine Arts in Munich (1880).

He then went to paint ten iconostases vesting the new artistic trends in all of them. His work can be seen in Mali Leskovac (1894), Pakrac where he worked with colleague and painter Steva Todorović), Jagodina where he did the wall paintings, in Trnava, and in Ružica Church in Belgrade (1901).

He also painted the iconostasis in his native Serbian church in Kragujevac which he completed in the year 1904 with his young assistant Milan Milovanović. It was at the same time when sculptor Đorđe Jovanović, working in Kragujevac, finished his monument to the heroes of the Battle of Kosovo.

== See also ==
- List of painters from Serbia
- Serbian art
