= Svetislav Jovanović =

Serbian Realist painter

Svetislav Jovanović Светислав Јовановић
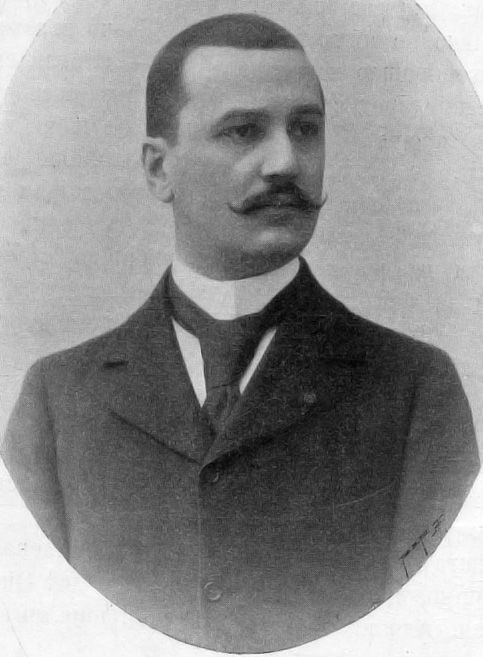
- Svetislav Jovanović, 1899
- Born: 15 March 1861; Vršac, Austrian Empire
- Died: 1933 (aged 71–72); Paris, France
- Known for: Painting, swimming, fencing
- Movement: Orientalist; Realist
- Awards: Legion of Honor; Order of the White Eagle (1st Class); Order of St. Sava (1st Grade)

Svetislav Jovanović (Serbian Cyrillic: Светислав Јовановић; 15 March 1861 – 1933) was a Serbian Realist painter.

== Biography ==
He was born on March 15, 1861, in Vršac. He was the brother of the famous Serbian painter Paja Jovanović and Milan Jovanović, the most famous Serbian photographer of the 19th century.

Jovanović finished high school in Vienna, where he began his studies in painting. He continued his studies in 1879 in Petrograd, Munich (with his brother Paja Jovanović) and Paris at the Zillian Academy. He spent most of his life in Paris, where he lived for fifty years.

He was especially esteemed in Paris, where he lived and was gladly accepted into the highest circles of France. One of his closest friends was the son of the President of the French Republic, Marie François Sadi Carnot. Svetislav Jovanović was decorated in 1928 with the French Order of the Légion d'honneur, and the Kingdom of Serbia awarded him the highest rank: the Order of the White Eagle and the Order of Saint Sava. Svetislav Jovanović made a self-portrait of himself in a fencing suit with a brush in his hands.

Namely, he was not only an artist but also a swimmer, rider and swordsman with worldwide fame at the time. In Paris, Svetislav won the highest championship titles in 1904 and 1907 as a swordsman. About this, Gaston Renar, Jovanović's biographer, who places him among the world's most celebrated swordsmen, writes: "Hundreds of the defeated dropped their weapons under Jovanović's blows." swordsmen of the world such as Boda, Lana, Busea. That all this was not an exaggeration can be seen from the fact that Jovanović was the president of the largest and most powerful fencing club in France - the "Paris Fencing Club", which brought together personalities from the highest circles of France. Jovanović was elected to the post as a foreign citizen, although the rules explicitly stipulated that the president could only be French.

Jovanović died in Paris in 1933 and was buried in the renowned Père Lachaise Cemetery.

== Works ==
- Prelje (-1899)
- Polazak u lov (1899)
- Ašikovanje (1901)
- Albanac (1905)
- Orijentalka (1905–10)
- Mlada crnogorka (1910)
- Autoportret (1921)

== Gallery ==
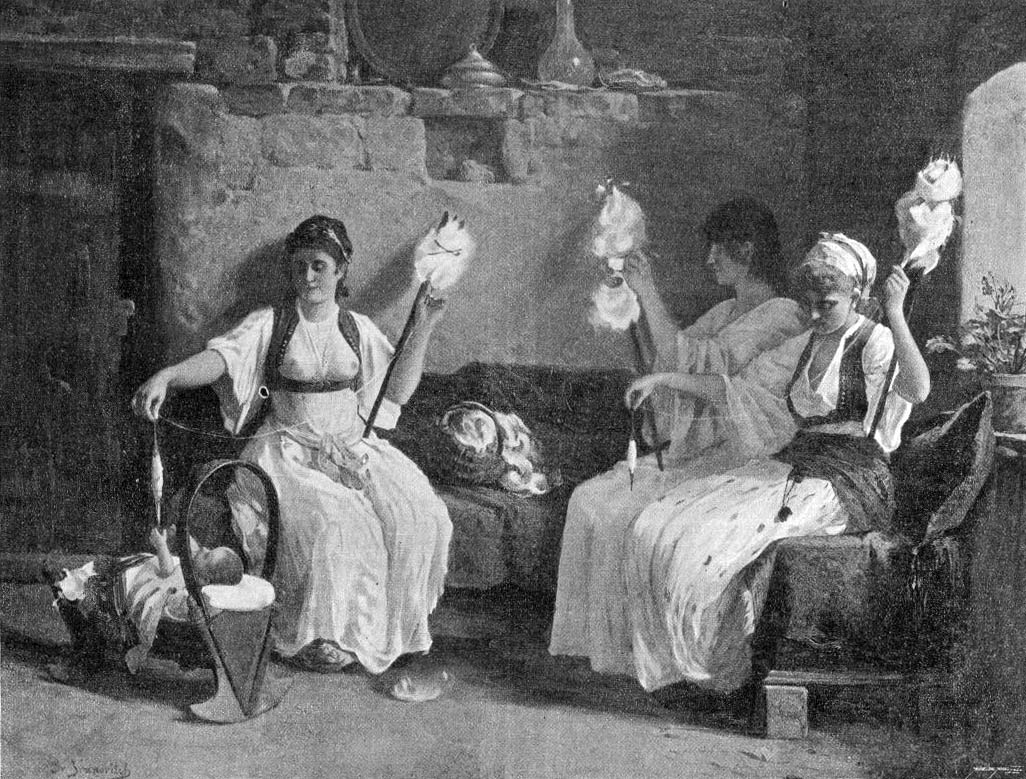
Prelje (B&W copy)

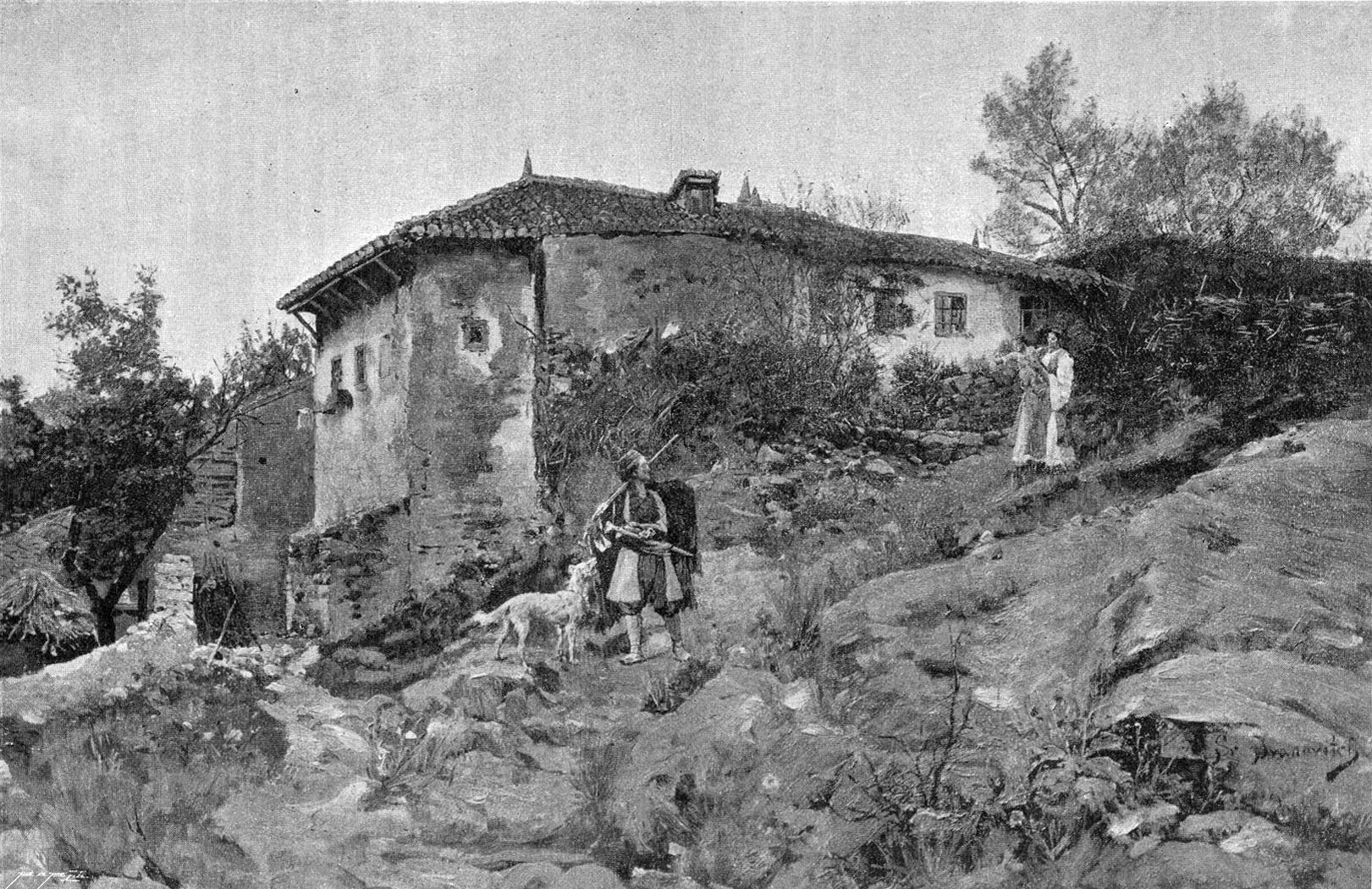
Polazak u lov (B&W copy)

== See also ==
- List of Orientalist artists
- Orientalism
- Serbian art
- List of painters from Serbia

== Sources ==
- Емилија В. Церовић (2007). "Светислав Јовановић - сликар". Rastko.
