= Grigorije Jezdimirović =

Serbian painter (b. 1745, d. 1822)

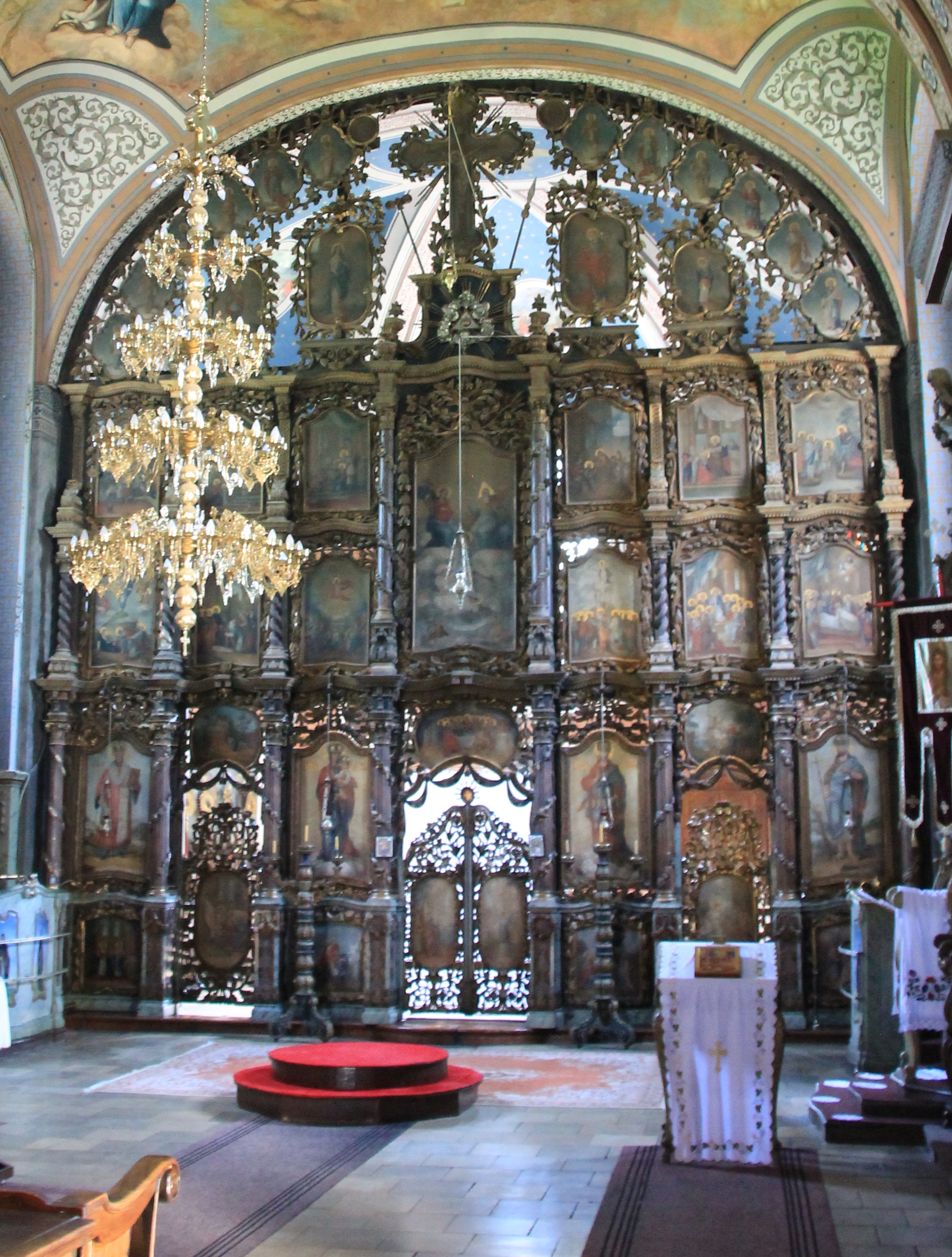
Iconostasis of Sveti Đurađ monastery, 1804

Grigorije Jezdimirović (Serbian:Григорије Јездимировић:Borovo Selo, near Vukovar, Srem, 1745 - Dalj, near Osijek, after 1822) was a Serbian painter.

From 1803 to 1804, painter Grigorije Jezdimirović worked on the iconostasis of the Serbian Orthodox Church of St. George in the Sveti Đurađ monastery, then part of the Austrian Empire, now Romania.

With master woodcarver Grigorije Dević, he also worked on the iconostasis of the church of Saint John the Baptist in Bačka Palanka in 1811. In Osijek, Jezdimirović worked on iconostases with painters Jovan Isailović, Jovan Isailović, Jr., Jovan Stanisavljević and others of his generation.
