= Jovan Isailović Jr. =

Serbian painter

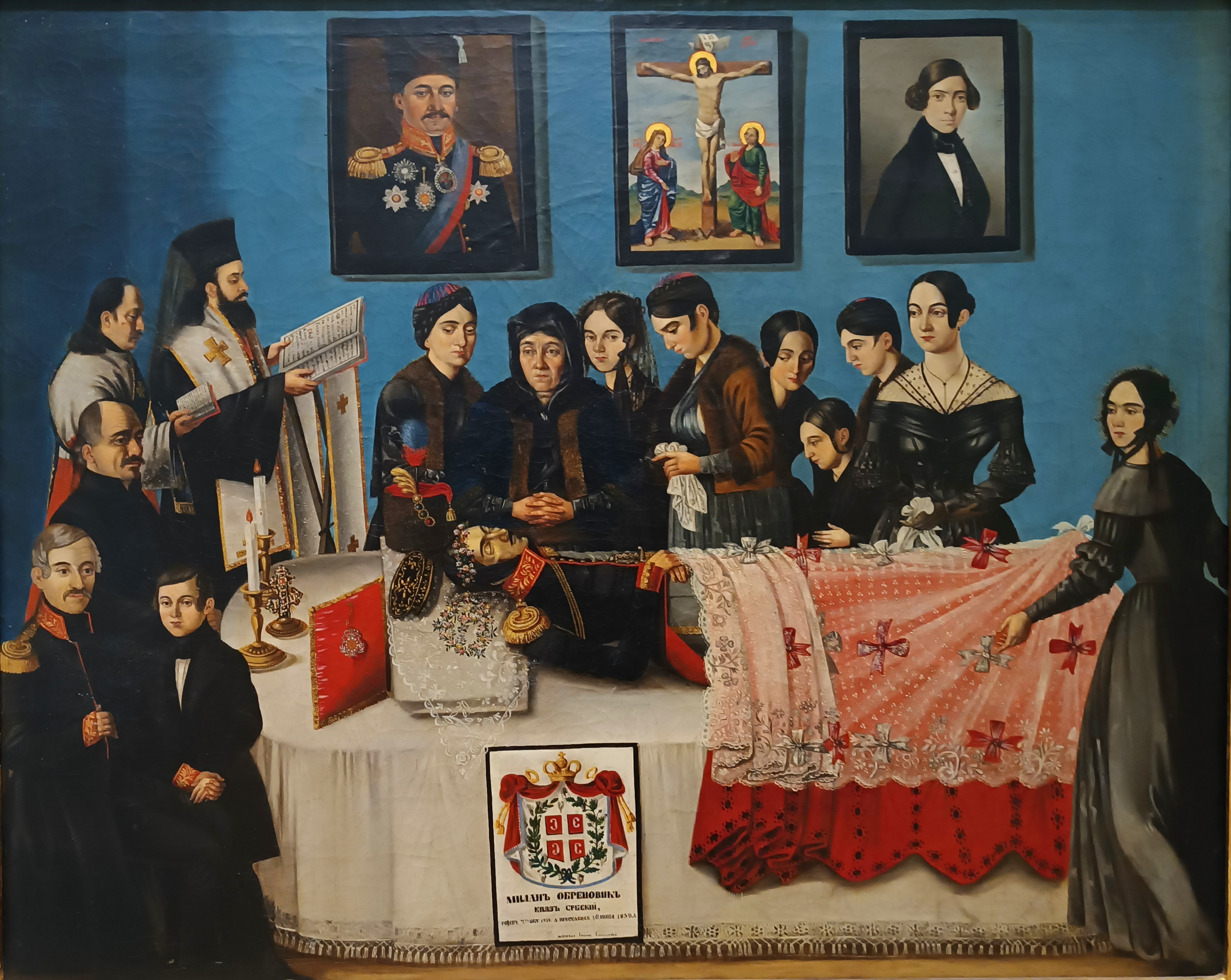
Deathbed of Milan Obrenović II, Prince of Serbia, 1839.

Jovan Isailović Jr. (1803 in Dalj – 1885) was a Serbian academic painter during the early and mid-nineteenth century.

== Biography ==
He studied painting in Vienna at the Academy of Fine Arts. His religious painting is characterized by influences from the Nazarene movement. Before leaving for Vienna he spent some time in Kragujevac (1833-1835) and painted several icons and portraits. After his return from Vienna, he was once again in the Principality of Serbia and in 1839 he painted his best-known work—Prince Milan Obrenović II on a catafalque, with several notables around him. For some time he was a court painter of Patriarch Samuilo Maširević in the Metropolitanate of Karlovci. He is mostly known for his wall paintings, fresco work in Serbian churches in Osijek, Bijelo Polje, Vukovar, Veliko Gradiste and other cities and towns. Also, his work is on exhibit at the National Museum in Belgrade and Museum of Vuk and Dositej.

He also painted Srbi oko guzlara (Serbian people and Gusle Player Singer) which hangs at the Matica Srpska.

Jovan is the grandson of Jovan Isailović Sr. who painted the iconostasis of the Serbian Orthodox Church of Saints Peter and Paul in Bijelo Polje in 1783.

He died in Stapar, Austria-Hungary, modern-day Serbia

== See also ==
- List of painters from Serbia
- Serbian art
