= Nikola Nešković =

Serbian painter (c. 1729 – 1785)

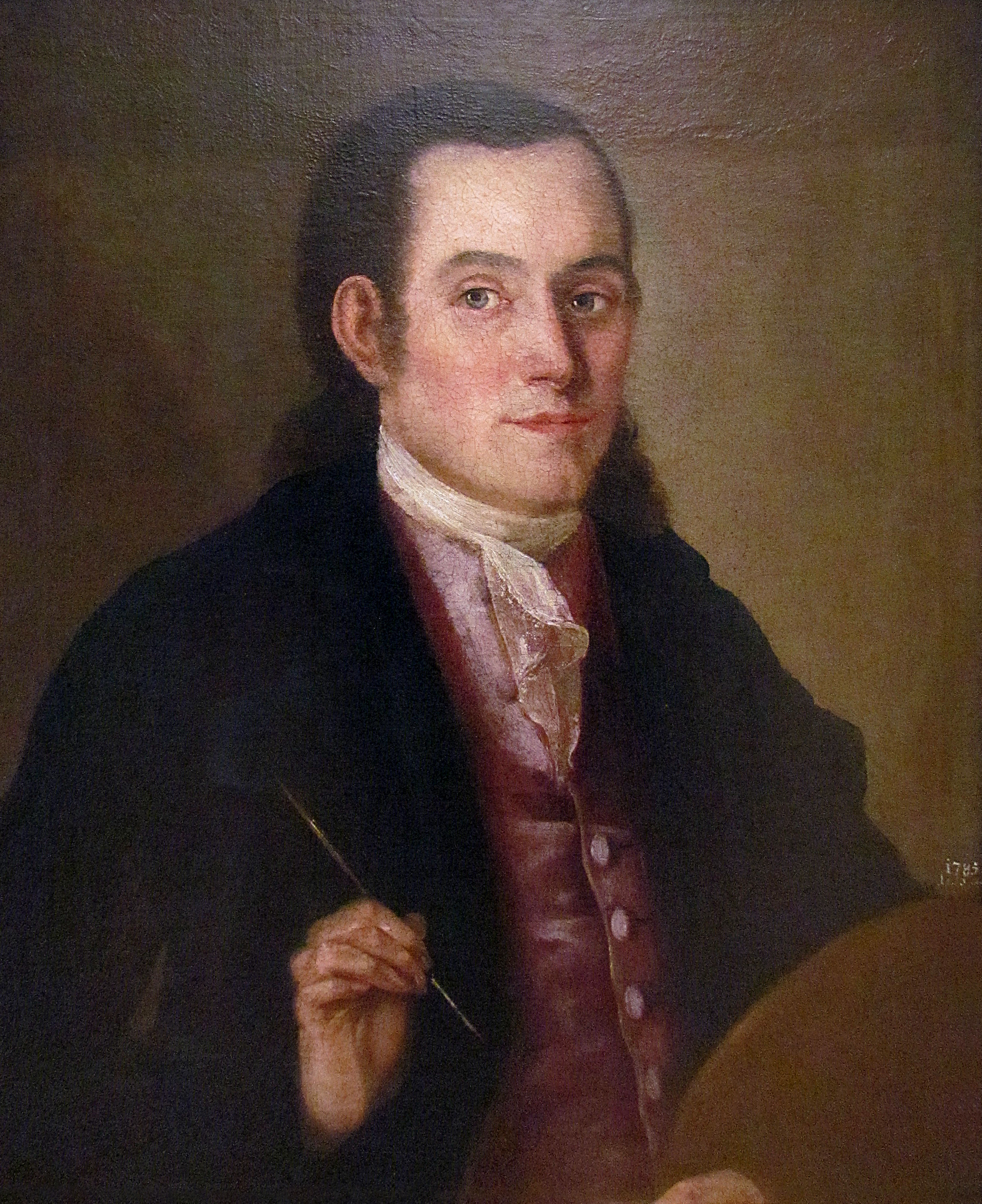
Nikola Neškovic, Self Portrait, ~1775

Nikola Nešković (c. 1729 – 1785) was a Serbian religious painter of the 18th century. He is the author of over a thousand works, including many icons, frescos, and portraits. He is the grandfather of Jovan Sterija Popović.

== Biography ==
Nešković was born in Požarevac but went on to live and work in the Habsburg monarchy, sent by his father who died in the Battle of Grocka. As a young student, he was sent by Bishop Jovan (Georgijević) to the art academy in Kiev Pechersk Lavra (Kiev Monastery of the Caves) and upon his return to Vršac he painted the sanctuary screens (iconostasis) of the court chapels. It is at the court of Bishop Jovan Georgijević in Vršac that Nesković came into prominence. Stored in the court treasury is a collection of portraits of dignitaries, the works of Teodor Kračun, Jakov Orfelin, Šerban Popović, Teodor Ilić Češljar, Konstantin Pantelić, Nedeljko Popović, Nikola Nešković and other trained Serbian painters. This valuable collection has been processed in a catalogue by the Institute for the Protection of Cultural Monuments and Matica Srpska from Novi Sad. Their works are distinguished for refined Baroque and Biedermeier styles of the period.

== Gallery ==
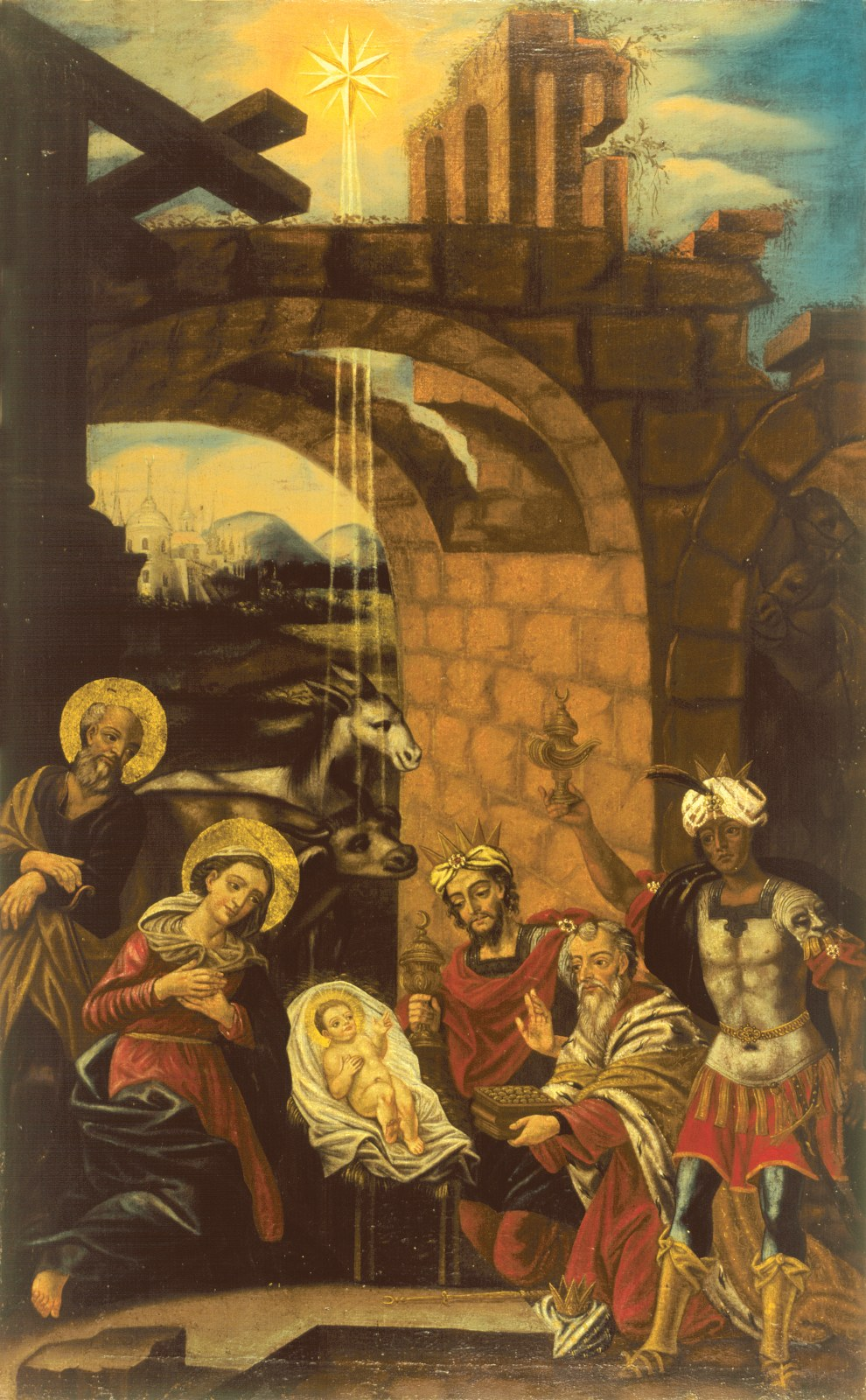
Birth of Christ, c. 1762

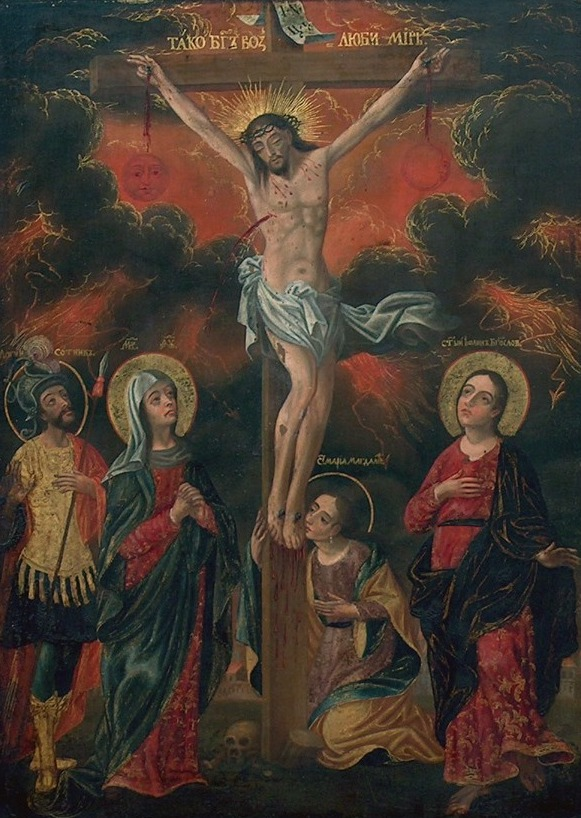
Christ's crucifixion, c. 1780

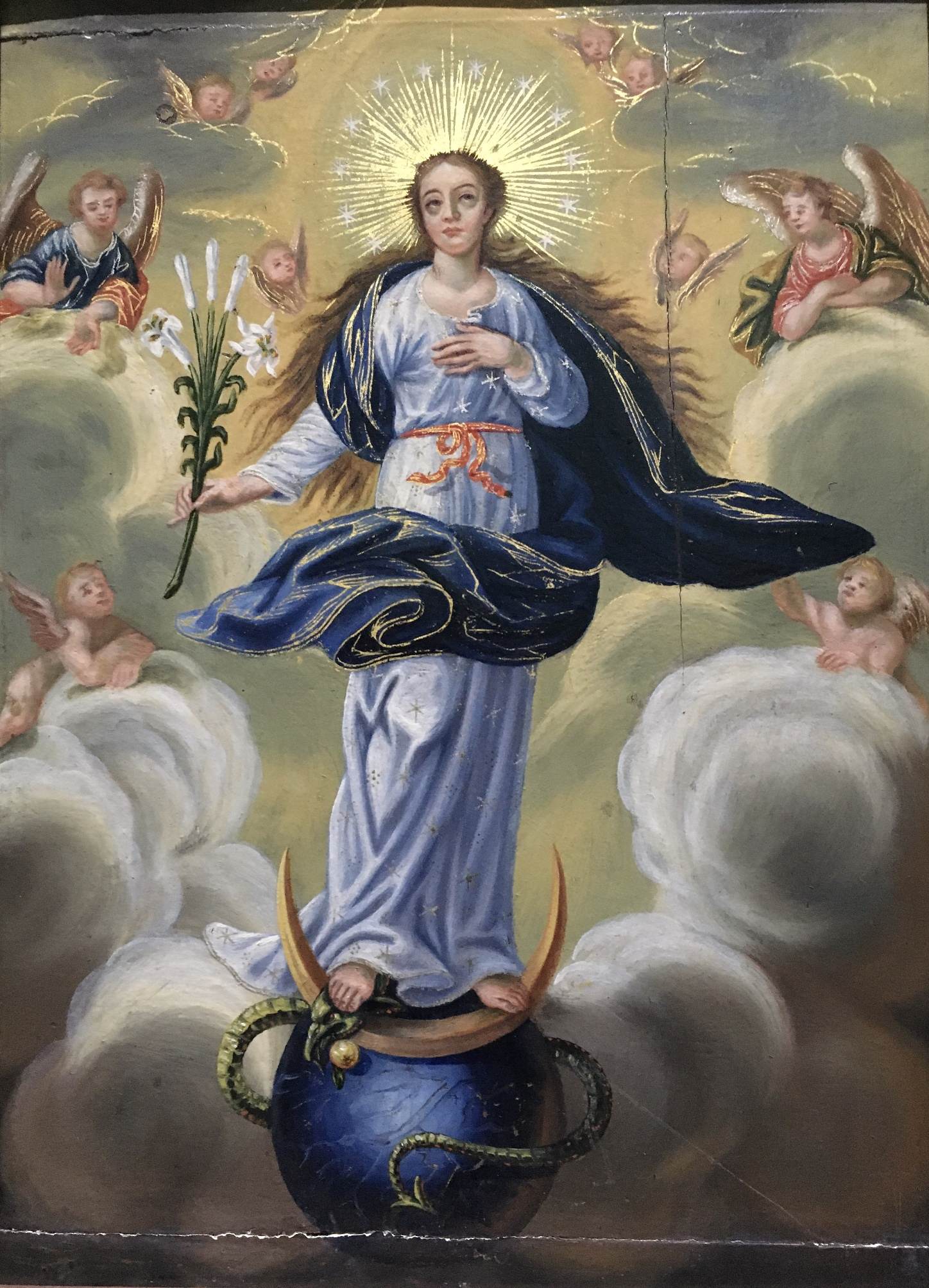
Virgin Mary with a Lilly, late 18th century

== See also ==
- List of painters from Serbia
- Serbian art
