= Jovan Popović (painter) =

Serbian painter in the 19th century

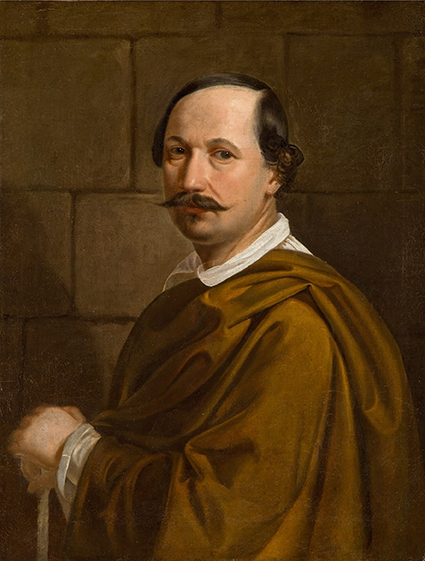
- Born: 14 November 1810; Opovo, Austrian Empire
- Died: 25 September 1864 (aged 53); Pančevo, Austrian Empire
- Education: Academy of Fine Arts Vienna
- Occupation: Painter

Jovan Popović (14 November 1810 – 25 September 1864) was a Serbian portrait painter.

== Biography ==
Popović was born in Opovo in Banat in 1810. From 1839 he lived in Belgrade. He was first taught painting by Konstantin Danil and later he pursued his academic studies in Vienna at the famed Academy of Fine Arts. His professors there were Joseph von Führich and Leopold Kupelwieser.

In 1845 he returned to Belgrade, but once there, unable to get commissions because they were being given to his professional rival Dimitrije Avramović, he decided to return to Opovo in Banat in late 1845 and marry his high school sweetheart. His best man was Jovan Sterija Popović.

He is credited to have painted the icons in the iconostasis of the St. Nicholas Serbian Orthodox Church in Dolovo, from 1853 to 1855. In the spirit of Biedermeier, Popović painted portraits of people, women, and children, members of the civilian population like his contemporary colleague Katarina Ivanović.

== Legacy ==
A school in Novi Sad is named after Popović.

== Gallery ==
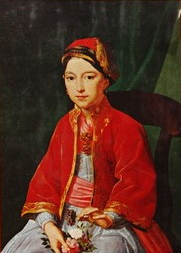
Women portrait

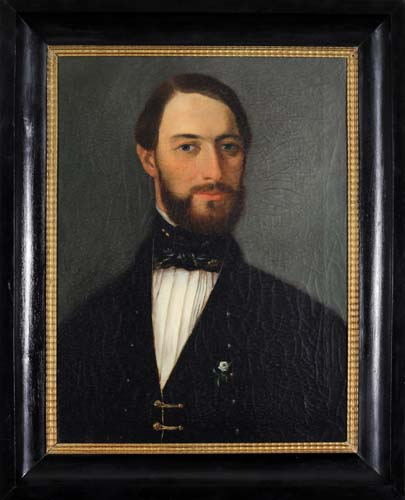
Portrait of a man, 1838

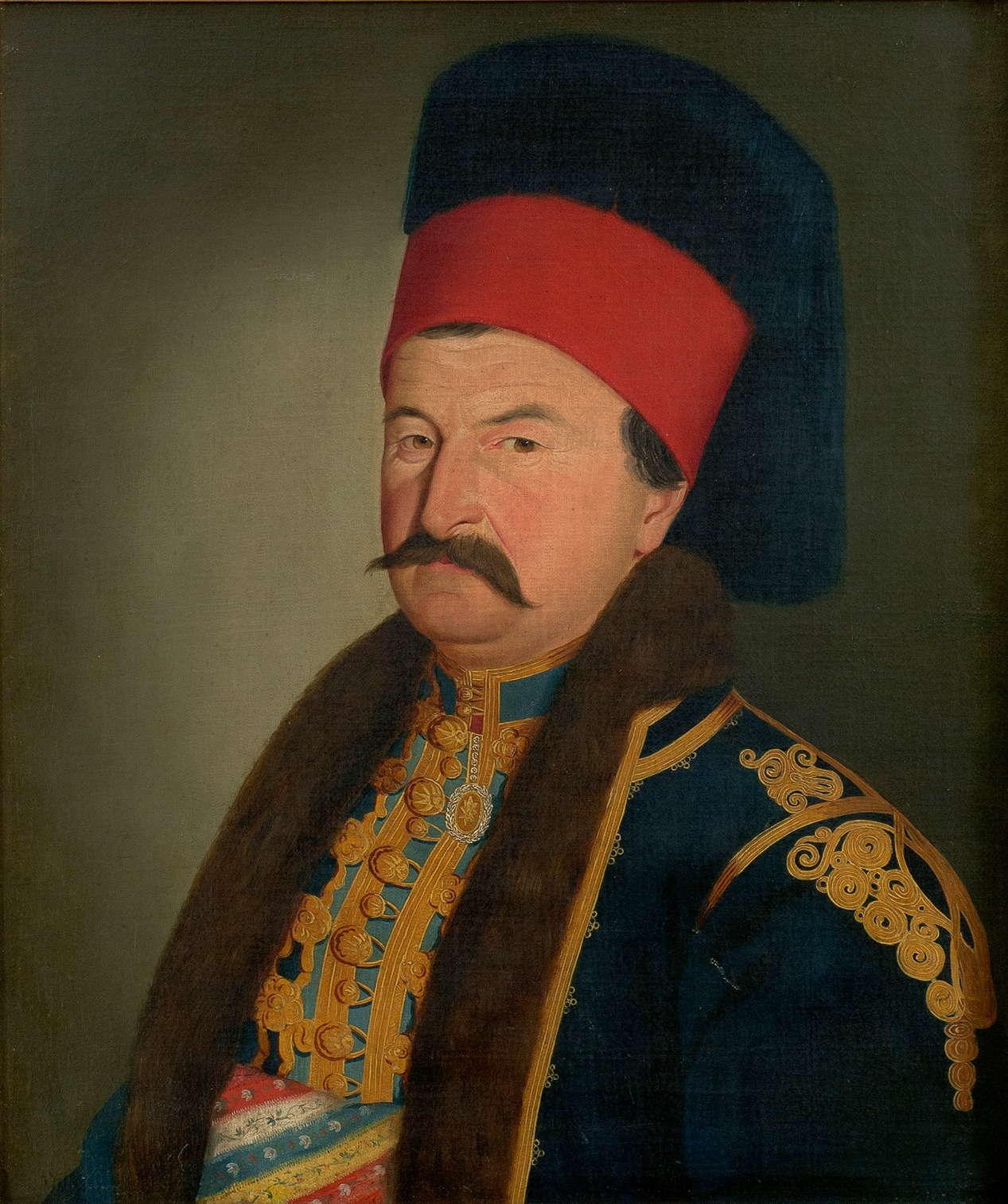
Toma Vučić Perišić,1841

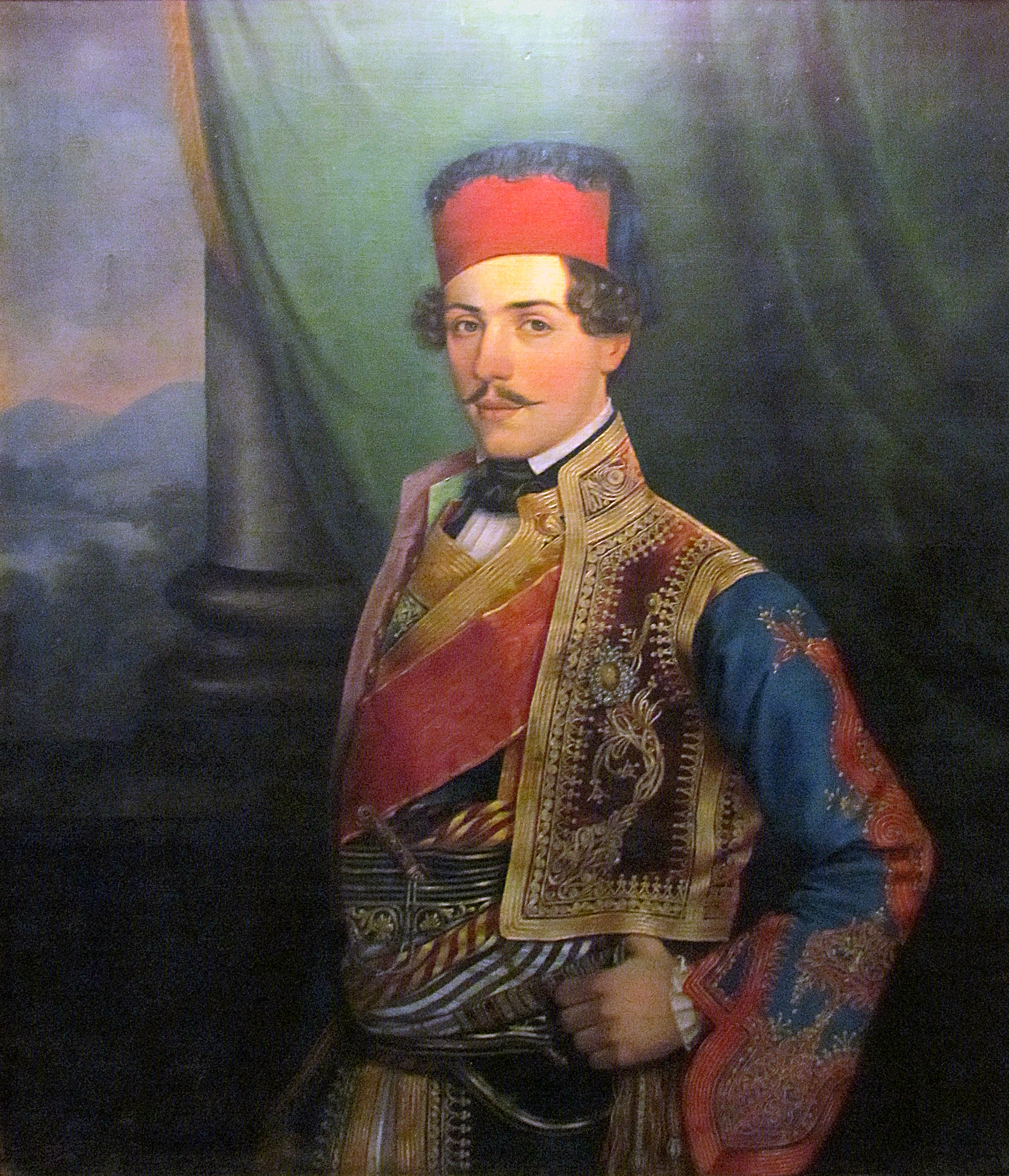
Prince Mihailo Obrenović, 1841

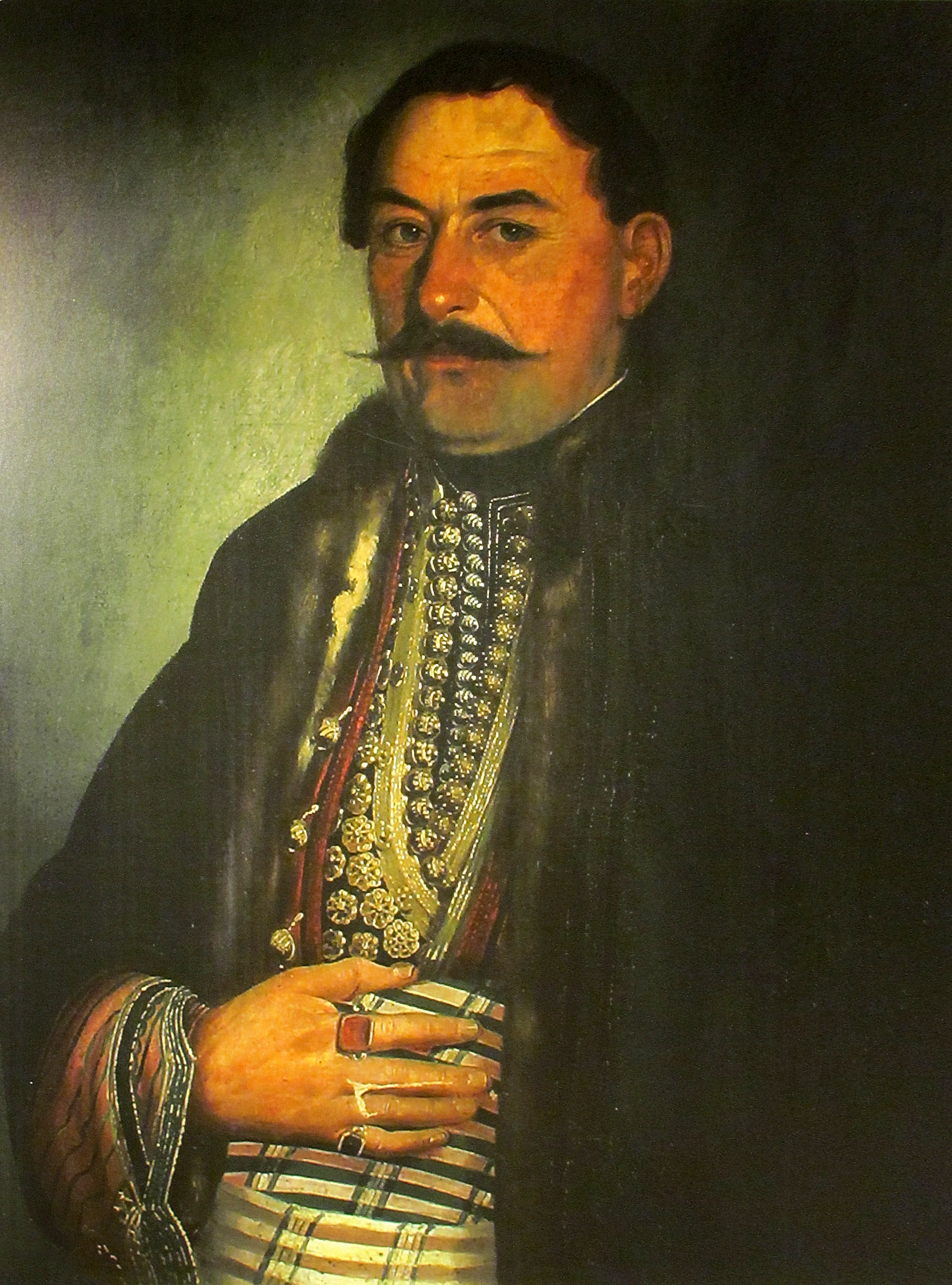
Portrait of Miloje Božić 1841, National Museum of Serbia

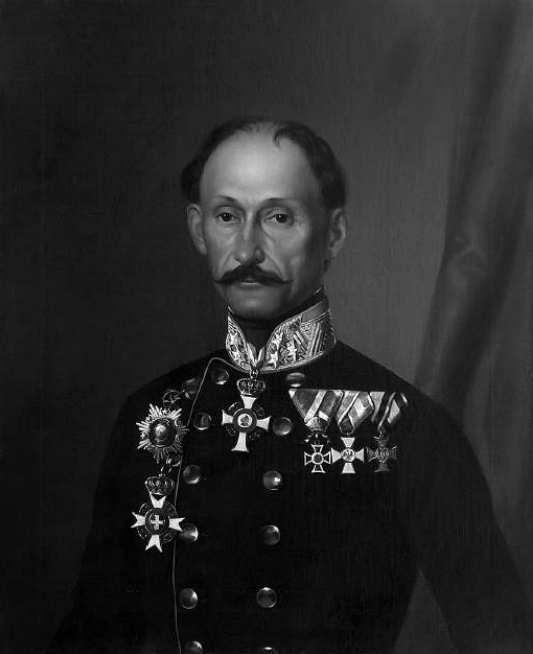
Teodor Teja Radosavljević, 1856

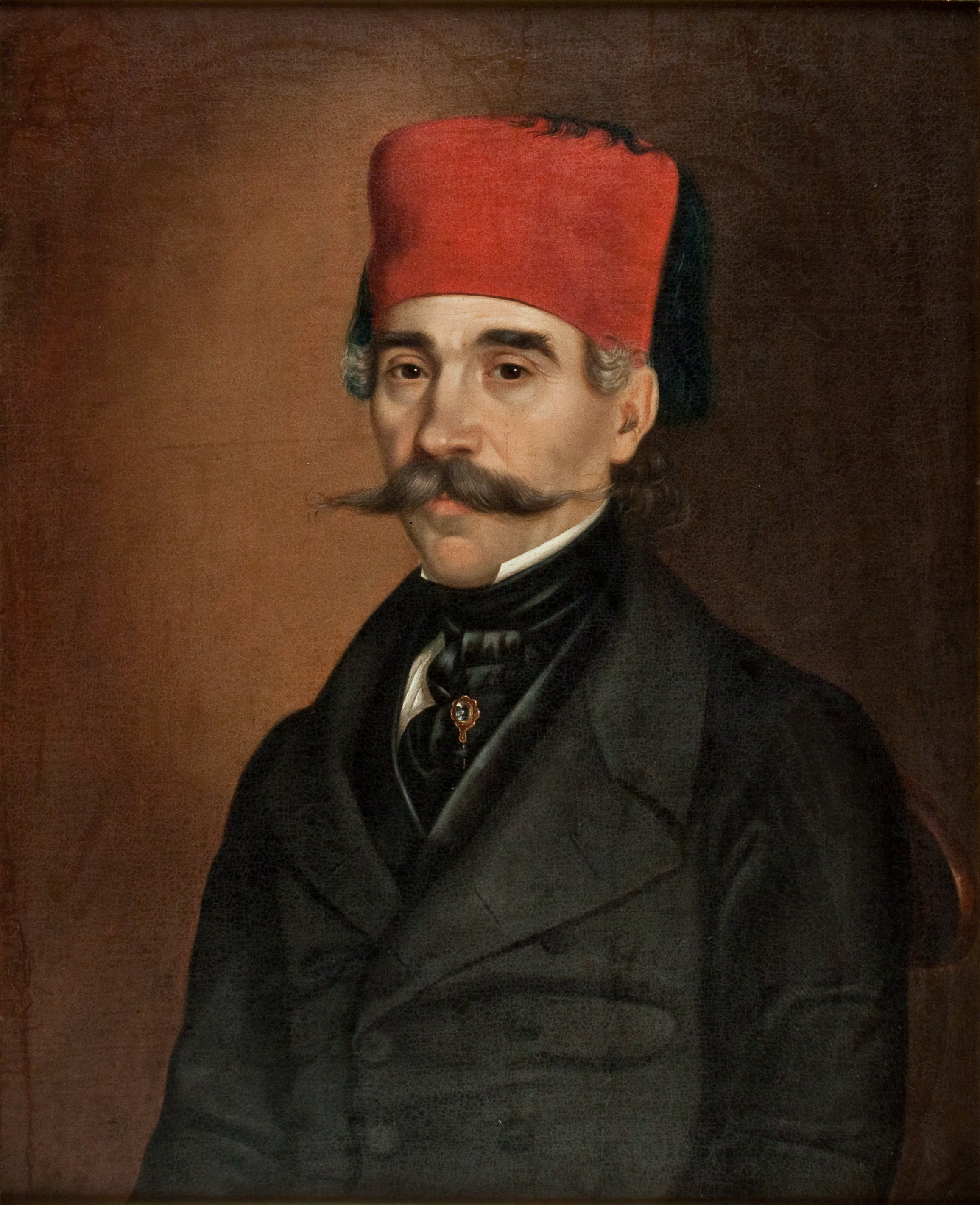
Vuk Karadžić

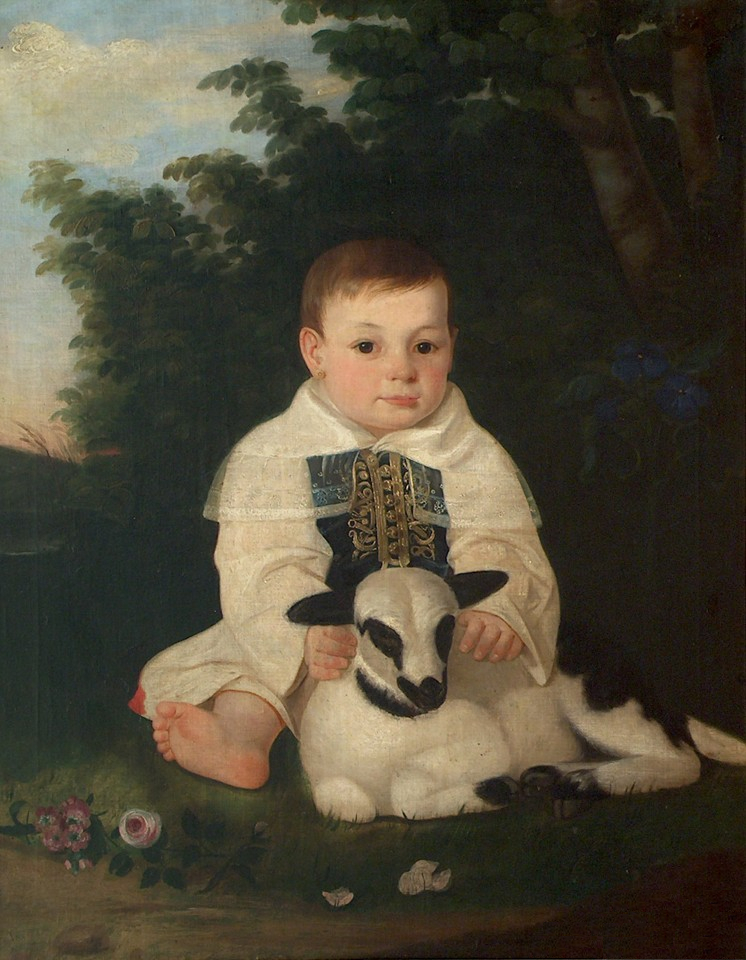
Child with a lamb

== See also ==
- List of painters from Serbia
