= Sava Krabulević =

Serbian painter who worked in Russia and Serbia

Sava Krabulević (also known as Ivashko Krabulev and Savatije Krabuleć; Archduchy of Austria, now Serbia, c 1650 – Archduchy of Austria, after 1706) was a Serbian painter who worked in the second half of the seventeenth and the first decades of the eighteenth century, first in Russia and then in Serbian lands under Habsburg monarchy. He was a disciple of the 17th-century Russian master painters of Moscow. His work in iconography demonstrates influences of Baroque painting.

== Biography ==
The identity of Sava Krabulević was discovered in the main archives of the Ministry of Foreign Affairs in Moscow by Serbian art researcher and priest Lazar Bogdanović (1861–1932) and first published in 1900 in Srpski Sion, an Art magazine. For the next hundred and more years Krabulević was known only through archival evidence and the iconostasis in the Serbian Orthodox Monastery of Orahovica in today's Slavonia.

Little information survives about his life; even the year of Sava Krabulević's birth is unknown. What is known is how Krabulević found himself in Moscow (1688–1694). Sava's father moved from Old Serbia to the Austrian-controlled territories of Serbia across the Sava and Danube rivers, probably in the 1670s and then became a cavalry officer in the Military Frontier. He died fighting the Turks at the Battle of Vienna in 1683.

After his father's death, Sava, who was still a young man then, settled at Komárom on the Danube. But in the ensuing skirmishes and battles with Ottomans and their Tatar vassals, Sava was captured and taken to the Crimean Khanate. Four years later, Sava managed somehow to escape and arrive in Moscow. There, he told the Russian authorities that his vocation before being captured, was masterstvo— meaning creative, artistic work. From the document we could freely postulate that he worked as an assistant to the painters employed by Posolsky Prikaz and the Kremlin Armoury for the next six years (in fact, from 1688 to 1694). It is evident from Krabulević's icons produced for Orahovica Monastery that he acquired his knowledge and honed his skill with the best masters in Imperial Russia of that period. Their surviving works, created in the period preceding the reforms of co-rulers Ivan V of Russia and Peter the Great, show influences of modern realistic painting introduced in Russia and later in Serbia in the late 17th and early 18th century by native-born painters themselves.

In Krabulević's inscription on the Orahovica iconostasis, he used Russian words that were foreign to contemporary speakers of the Serbian language at the time. Also, when he wrote the year that he completed the icons, he used a special abbreviation only common among Russians. That's why for years it was thought that the Orahovica work was completed on 9 June 1607 when in fact it was in 1697; in addition, Krabulević used dark olive and pink colors, which were not found in the palette of Serbian painters. All traces of him disappear until an archival document found in the main archive of Budapest which unraveled the whereabouts of the painter after 1697. A copy of a letter, dated 21 May 1708, signed by Metropolitan Isaija Đaković asking Serbs to join Jovan Tekelija's militia against Francis II Rákóczi who was threatening the Archduchy of Austria with his so-called Rákóczi's War of Independence. That letter was copied multiple times by Sava Krabulević who was then an assistant to Metropolitan Isaija and his secretary in some administrative capacity at the Metropolitanate of Karlovci. It is also possible that Isaija Đaković invited and even sponsored Krabulević from Russia in the first place. There is ample evidence that Isaija who built Serbian schools wrote to at least one of the Russian co-rulers asking for teachers in literacy and the sciences and arts.

== See also ==
- List of painters from Serbia
- Serbian art
