= Bajić =

Bajić (Serbian: Бајић) is a Serbo-Croatian surname, a patronymic derived from the masculine nickname Baja. It may refer to:

- Aleksandar Bajić (born 1987), Serbian footballer
- Ana Bajić (born 1995), Serbian taekwondo practitioner
- Ante Bajic (born 1995), Austrian footballer
- Brana Bajic, Bosnian-born British actress
- Branimir Bajić (born 1979), Bosnian footballer
- Branislav Bajić (born 1977), Serbian footballer
- Branko Bajić (born 1998), Bosnian footballer
- Darko Bajić (born 1955), Serbian film director
- Delimir Bajić (born 1983), Bosnian-Herzegovinian footballer
- Đorđe Bajić (born 1975), Serbian writer, literary and film critic
- Đorđe Bajić (born 1977), Serbian footballer
- Đuro Bajić (born 1938), Serbian politician
- Dragan Bajić (born 1973), Bosnian basketball coach and former player
- Filip Bajić (born 1993), Serbian footballer
- Isidor Bajić (1878–1915), Serbian composer
- Jurica Bajić (born 2000), Croatian footballer
- Kosta Bajić (born 1989), Serbian footballer
- Luka Bajić (born 2000), Croatian water polo player
- Marko Bajić (born 1985), Serbian footballer
- Mane Bajić (1941–1994), Serbian footballer
- Mate Bajić (born 1995), German-born Croatian footballer
- Milena Bajić (born 1996), Montenegrin basketball player
- Milenko Bajić (1944–2009), Bosnian-Herzegovinian and Yugoslav footballer and manager
- Miloš Bajić (1915–1995), Serbian painter
- Miloš Bajić (born 1994), Bosnian-Herzegovinian footballer
- Mirko Bajić (born 1950), Serbian politician
- Mladen Bajić (born 1950), Croatian jurist
- Nedeljko Bajić Baja (born 1968), Serbian singer
- Petar Bajić (1934–2013), Yugoslav sports shooter
- Uroš Bajić (born 1992), Serbian politician
- Radoš Bajić (born 1953), Serbian actor and scenarist
- Riad Bajić (born 1994), Bosnian footballer
- Robert Bajic (born 1977), Australian footballer
- Stefan Bajic (born 1997), Italian-born Montenegrin footballer
- Stefan Bajic (born 2001), French footballer of Serbian descent
- Vladimir Bajić (born 1987), Serbian footballer
