= Baljić =

Baljić is a Bosnian surname. Notable people with the surname include:

- Elvir Baljić (born 1974), Bosnian footballer and manager
- Mirsad Baljić (born 1962), Bosnian footballer

== See also ==
- Bajić
