= Stefan Bajic =

Stefan Bajic may refer to:

- Stefan Bajic (footballer, born 1997), Montenegrin footballer
- Stefan Bajic (footballer, born 2001), French footballer
