= Dragoljub Stanković Čivi =

Serbian painter and visual artist (born 1946)

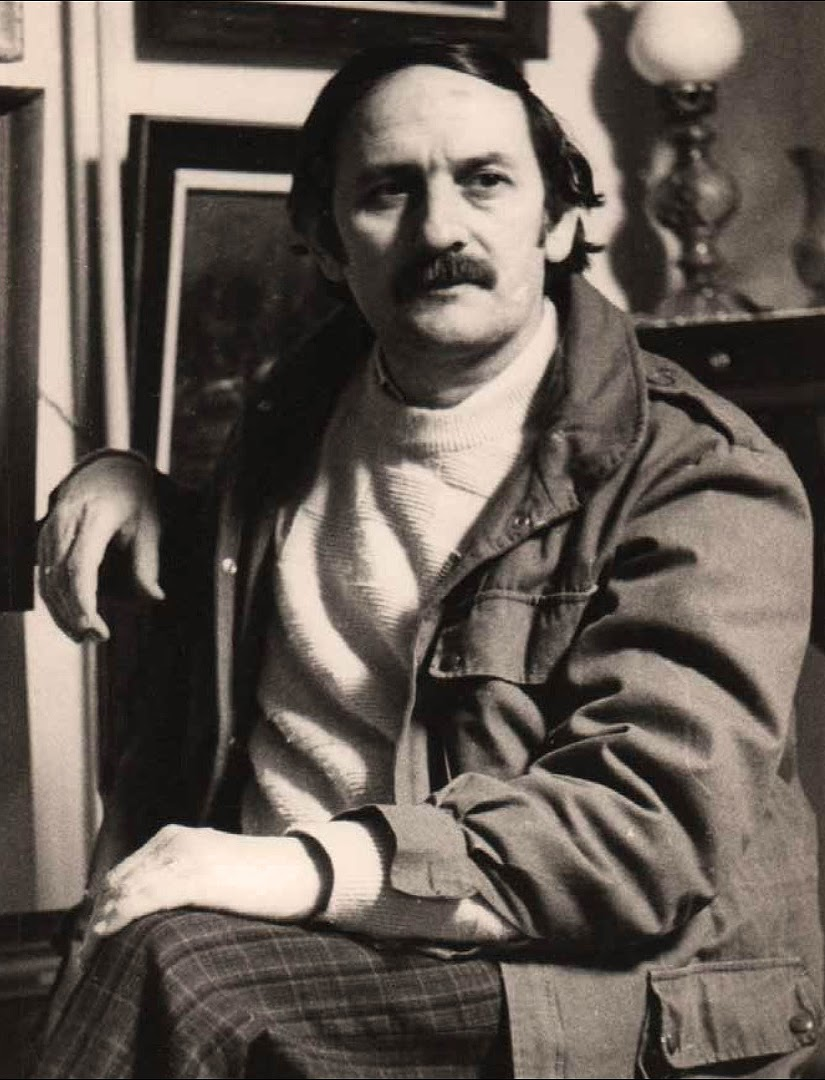
- Born: 30 May 1946 (age 79); Leskovac, FPR Yugoslavia
- Education: Faculty of Fine Arts, Belgrade
- Known for: Painting
- Movement: Lyrical landscapes, Intimism
- Children: Jugoslav Stanković,Nikola Stanković

Dragoljub Stanković Čivi (Serbian Cyrillic: Драгољуб Станковић Чиви; born 30 May 1946 in Leskovac) is a Serbian painter and visual artist known for his lyrical landscapes and depictions of southern Serbia. He has been exhibiting since 1968 and has been a member of the Association of Fine Artists of Serbia (ULUS) since 1987.

== Biography ==
Dragoljub Stanković was born on 30 May 1946 in Leskovac. He graduated from the "Đorđe Krstić" art school in Niš in 1967 and then from the Faculty of Fine Arts in Belgrade, painting department, where he graduated in 1975 in the class of professors Zoran Petrović and Miloš Bajić.

During the 1970s and 1980s, Stanković's artistic expression evolved from realistic landscapes towards lyrical intimacy. A significant portion of his work is dedicated to motifs from southern Serbia, its landscapes and interiors. In 1977, he participated in the exhibition Five Leskovac Painters. His first solo exhibition was held in 1982 at the Gallery of the National Museum in Leskovac, confirming his lyrical and introspective approach to landscape and interior. That same year, he participated in the newly established Art Colony at Vlasina Lake.

By the late 1980s, Stanković became recognized for his depictions of the Leskovac landscape. In 1986, he won the First Prize at the Salon Oktobar '86 for his painting Courtyard with a Dovecote. In 1987, he exhibited at the Salon 77 in Niš. He participated in numerous group exhibitions in Serbia and abroad, including Kyustendil and Toronto (1988), where he took part in the Second International Biennial of Miniatures. At the Salon Oktobar '88, he received the Jury's Second Prize.

During the 1990s, Stanković entered a new phase of his creativity. He exhibited in Skopje (1991), Belgrade (Cvijeta Zuzorić Pavilion, 1992), Kragujevac and Niš (1993–94), and received the Golden Badge of the Cultural and Educational Community of Serbia (1993). His paintings and portraits from this period are characterized by poetic light and quiet coloristic harmony. By the mid-1990s, the artist turned towards a more abstract expression, as shown in his exhibition at the "Sunce" Gallery (1995). Thirty years of artistic work were marked by the exhibition Portraits (1997). Towards the end of the decade, he exhibited in Požarevac, Despotovac, Aranđelovac and Kragujevac, and participated in numerous art colonies across Serbia.

In the 2000s, Stanković frequently participated in international colonies such as La Pouget (France, 2007), and exhibited at the Biennial of the Serbian Landscape (2005, 2008, 2010, 2012, 2018). In 2010, he won the First Prize at the Salon Oktobar in Leskovac for the painting Large Bush, and in 2012, the First Prize for Micro-Autumn.

During the 2010s, he exhibited collectively in Serbia and abroad, including Viroflay near Paris (2011), Pirot and Belgrade (2013), and Belgrade and Leskovac (2015–2016). He participated in the humanitarian exhibition Painters for Hilandar (2018) and took part in art colonies in Sovljak and Ribarska Banja the same year. A retrospective exhibition of Stanković's works was held in 2019 at the Modern Gallery of the Cultural Center in Gornji Milanovac, and in 2021 he participated for the seventh time in the Studenica Art Colony. In 2022, the National Museum in Leskovac organized a retrospective exhibition of his works, announcing the publication of the monograph Svetlost i sentiment – slikarstvo Dragoljuba Stankovića (Light and Sentiment – The Painting of Dragoljub Stanković) by Živojin Prokopović.

== Style and influence ==
Stanković's work is characterized by a lyrical interpretation of the landscape, with a pronounced sense of the light and atmosphere of southern Serbia. He began his artistic path with motifs of his native region, striving to repeatedly depict the charm of old Leskovac and the beauty of its landscapes and surroundings. Stanković's intimist painting, whether dealing with urban motifs or those painted in nature, is based on sentiment and light, and this quality and its resulting role are fundamental to his creative activity.

== Personal life ==
He is married to Ankica Mladenović and has two sons, Jugoslav and Nikola Stanković, both academic painters. He lives and works in Leskovac.

== Solo exhibitions ==
- 1982 Leskovac, Gallery of the National Museum
- 1985 Leskovac, Gallery of the House of Culture
- 1987 Niš, Fortress, Salon 77
- 1988 Leskovac, Youth Center Gallery
- 1991 Skopje, House of Culture, KORA Gallery
- 1993 Kragujevac, National Museum
- 1994 Niš, Fortress, Salon 77
- 1994 Pirot, "Čedomir Krstić" Art Gallery
- 1997 Vlasotince, Gallery of the National Museum
- 1999 Leskovac, National Museum
- 2002 Požarevac, National Museum
- 2005 Leskovac, House of Culture
- 2009 Leskovac, "Radoje Domanović" National Library
- 2013 Pirot, "Čedomir Krstić" Gallery
- 2013 Belgrade, "Trag" Gallery
- 2014 Leskovac, "Radoje Domanović" National Library
- 2019 Gornji Milanovac, Modern Gallery
- 2020 Leskovac, "Radoje Domanović" National Library
- 2022 Leskovac, Gallery of the National Museum

== Selected group exhibitions ==
- 1974–2022: Numerous exhibitions in Belgrade, Leskovac, Niš, Kragujevac, Skopje, Toronto, France, including October Salons, ULUS Spring and Autumn exhibitions, and international art biennials.

== Selected art colonies ==
- 1970–2024: Participated in numerous domestic and international art colonies, including Kopašnica, Vlasina, Prohor Pčinjski, Studenica, Mina Vukomanović Karadžić, La Pouget (France), and the DMV Art Colony in Niš.

== Bibliography ==
- Svetozar Mirkov, Slike Dragoljuba Stankovića (Paintings of Dragoljub Stanković), catalog, Galerija Trag, Belgrade 2013
- Predrag Komanović, O slikarstvu Stankovića (On the Painting of Stanković), catalog, Galerija Čedomir Krstić, Pirot, 2013
- Radmila Kostić, Majski salon (May Salon), catalog, Kulturni centar Leskovac, 2016
- Suzana Novčić, 36. likovna kolonija Studenica (36th Studenica Art Colony), Kraljevo, 2011
- Ljiljana Ćinkul, Još jedno kreativno hodočašće (Another Creative Pilgrimage), 38. likovna kolonija Studenica 2013 (38th Studenica Art Colony 2013), catalog, Kraljevo, 2013
- D. Stojić, "Slikari u Hramu Svetog Save" (Painters in the Temple of Saint Sava), Novosti, 9 August, Belgrade, 2013
- Julka Marinković, Likovna kolonija Studenica, četiri decenije trajanja (Studenica Art Colony, Four Decades of Duration), exhibition catalog, Kraljevo, 2015
- Suzana Novčić, 42. međunarodna likovna kolonija Studenica 2017 (42nd International Studenica Art Colony 2017), catalog, Kraljevo 2017
- Suzana Novčić, 43. međunarodna likovna kolonija Studenica 2018 (43rd International Studenica Art Colony 2018), catalog, Kraljevo 2018
- Suzana Novčić, 44. Studenička likovna kolonija (44th Studenica Art Colony), catalog, Kraljevo 2019
- Olivera Vukotić, Jesen u Ribarskoj Banji (Autumn in Ribarska Banja), catalog, "Cvijeta Zuzorić" pavilion, 2018, Belgrade
- Svetozar Mirkov, Nemogućnost samoodricanja (The Impossibility of Self-Renunciation), catalog, Gornji Milanovac

== Gallery ==
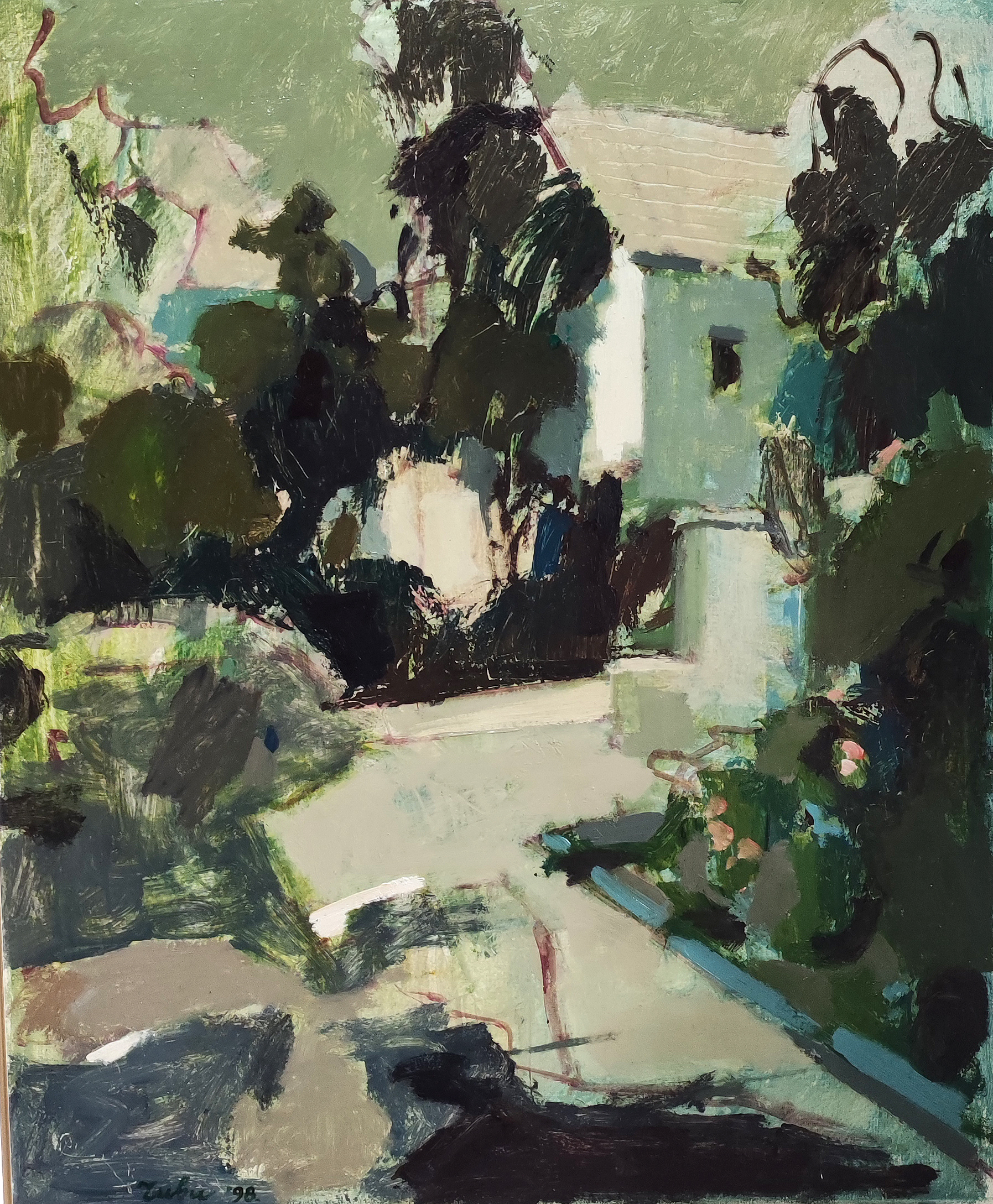
Courtyard with a Bird Cherry Tree, oil on canvas, 1993

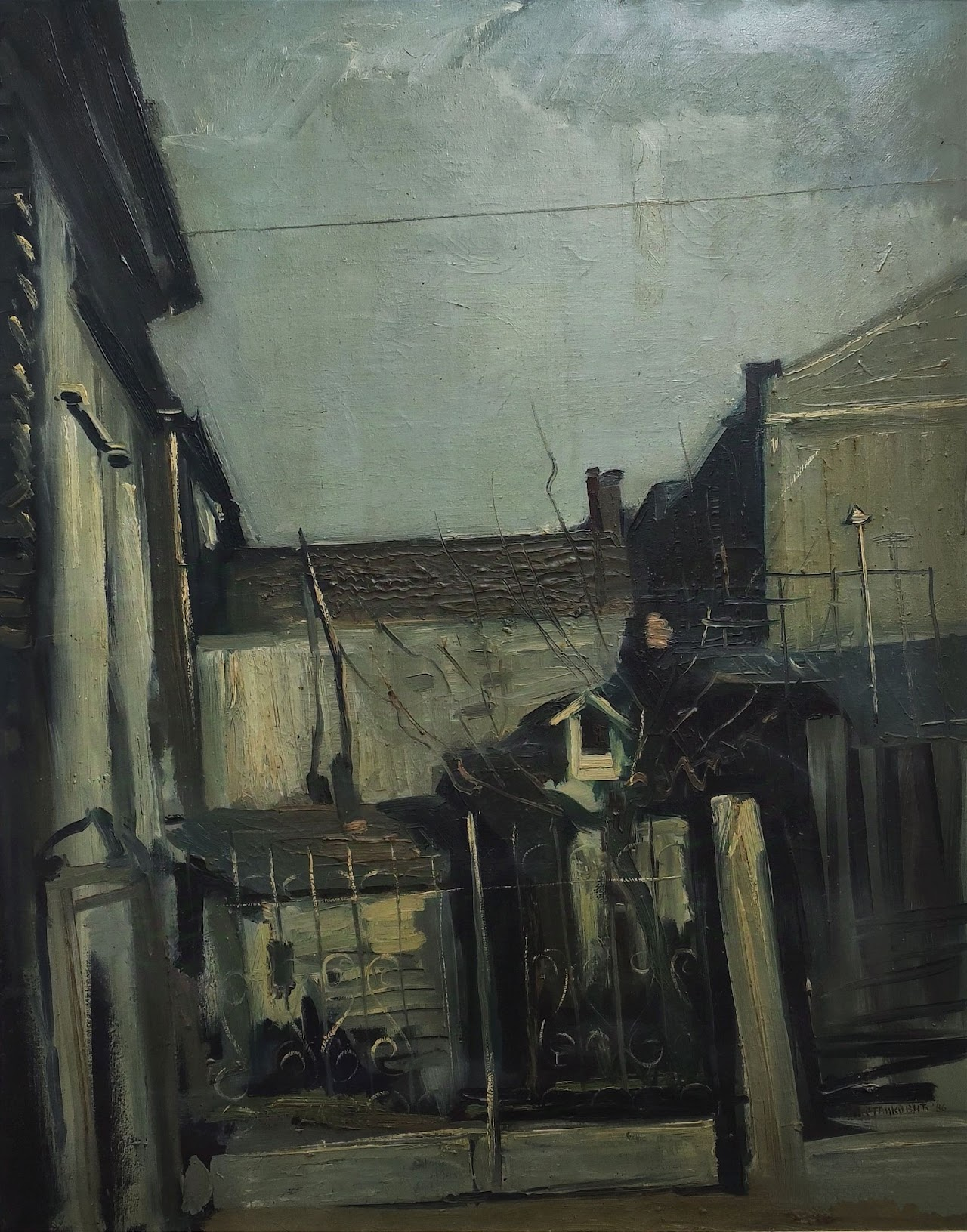
Courtyard with a Dovecote, oil on canvas, 1986

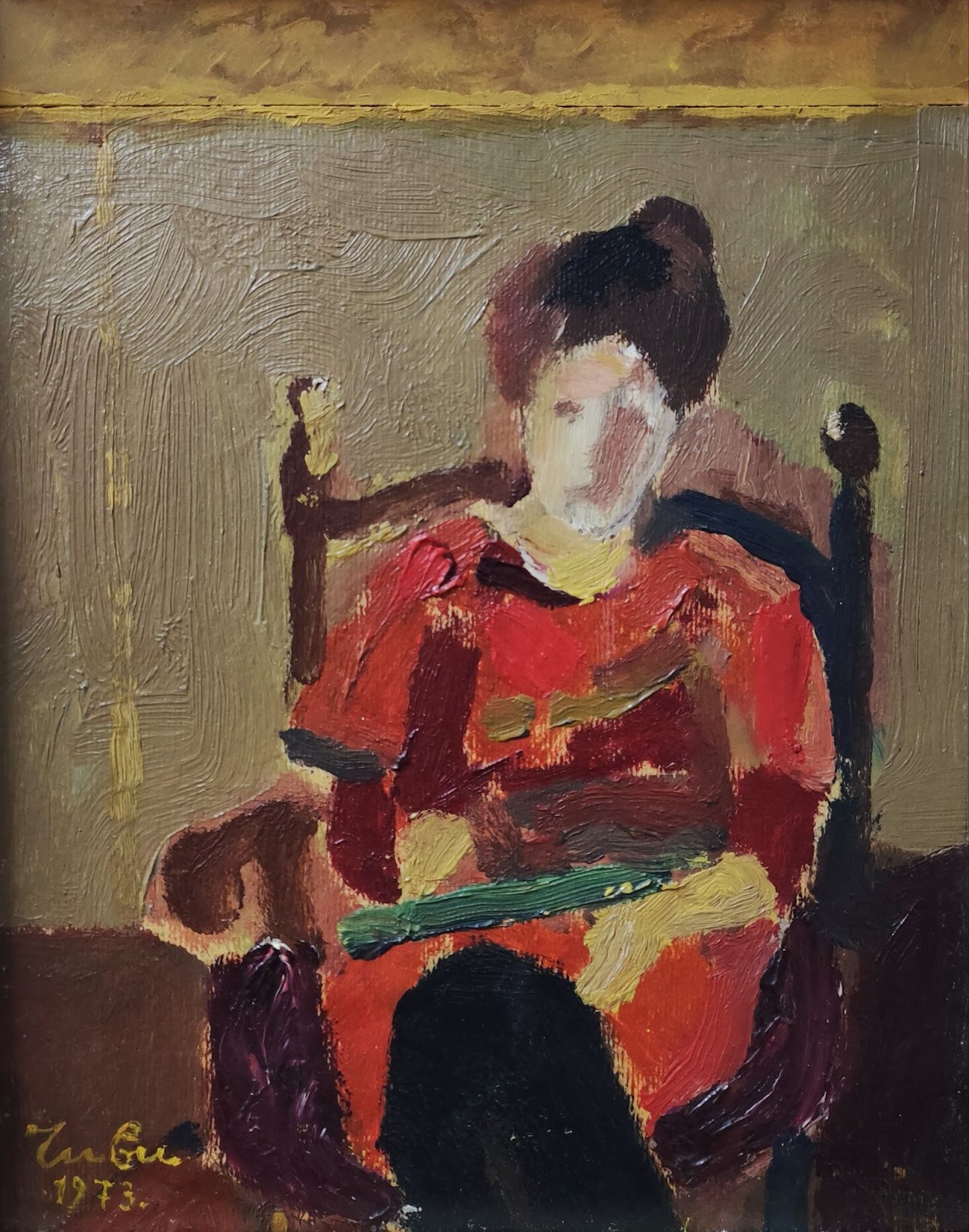
Girl Drawing, oil on cardboard, 1972

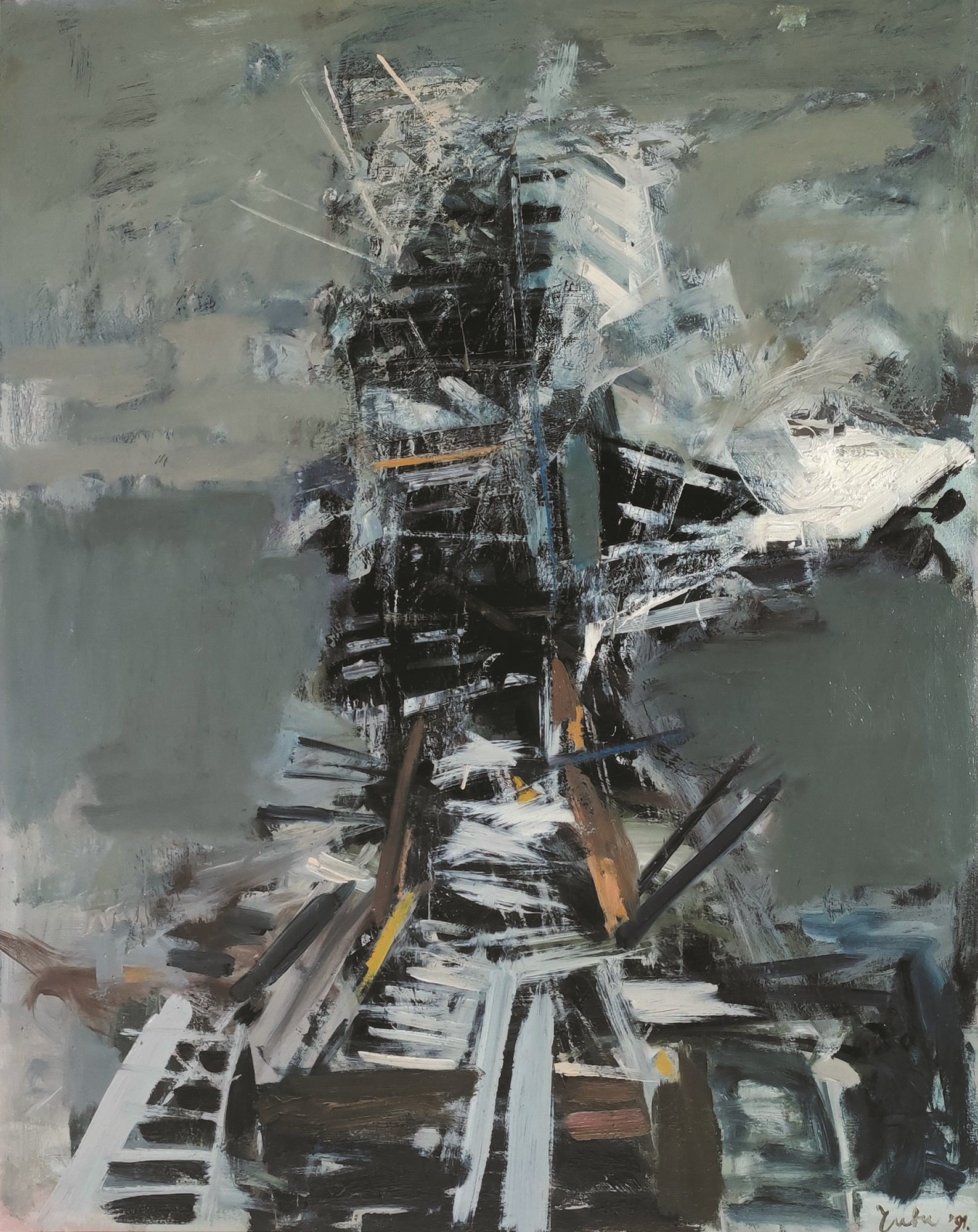
Destroyed Bridge, oil on canvas, 1991

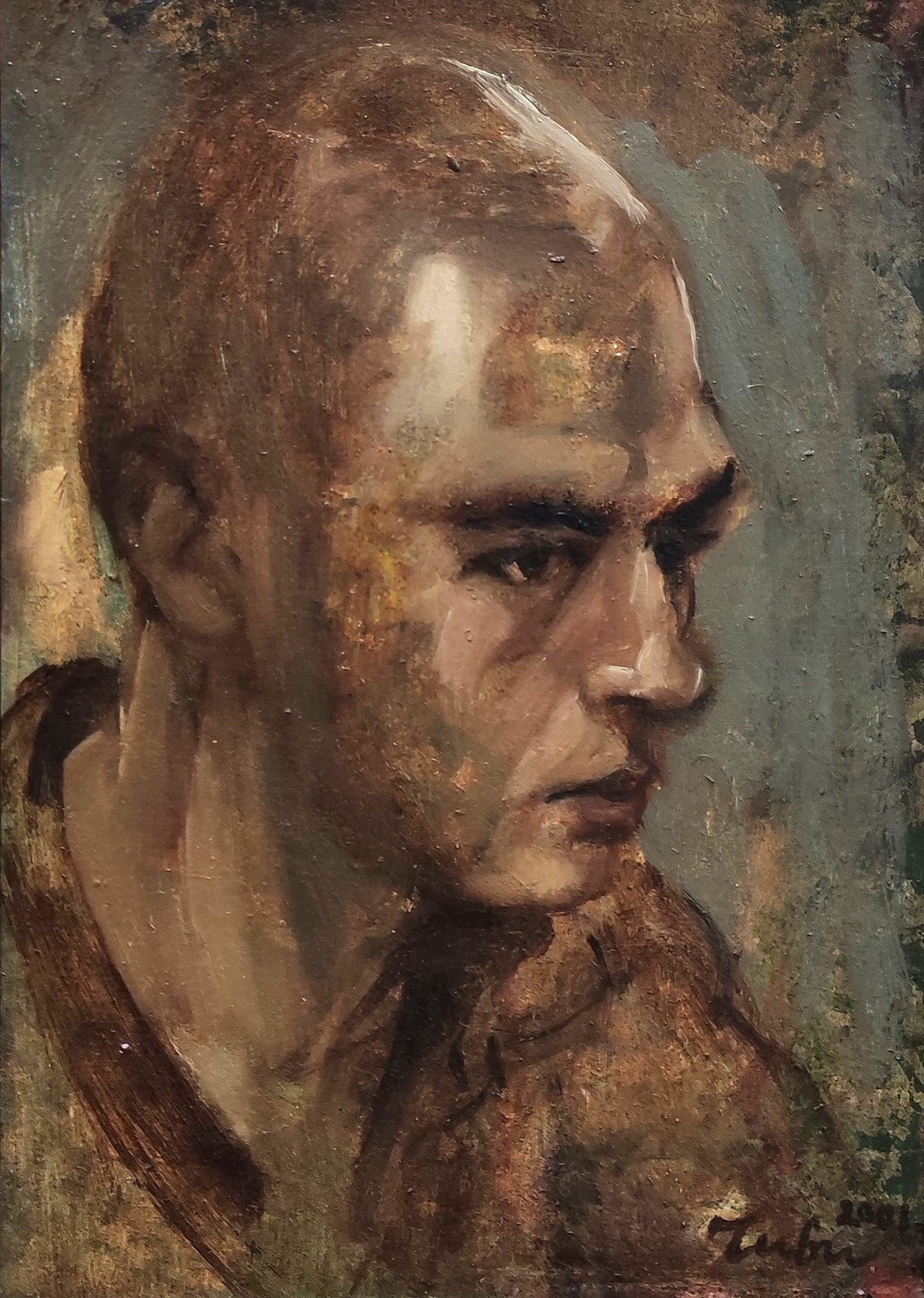
Portrait of the Artist's Son Nikola Stanković, oil on canvas, 2001

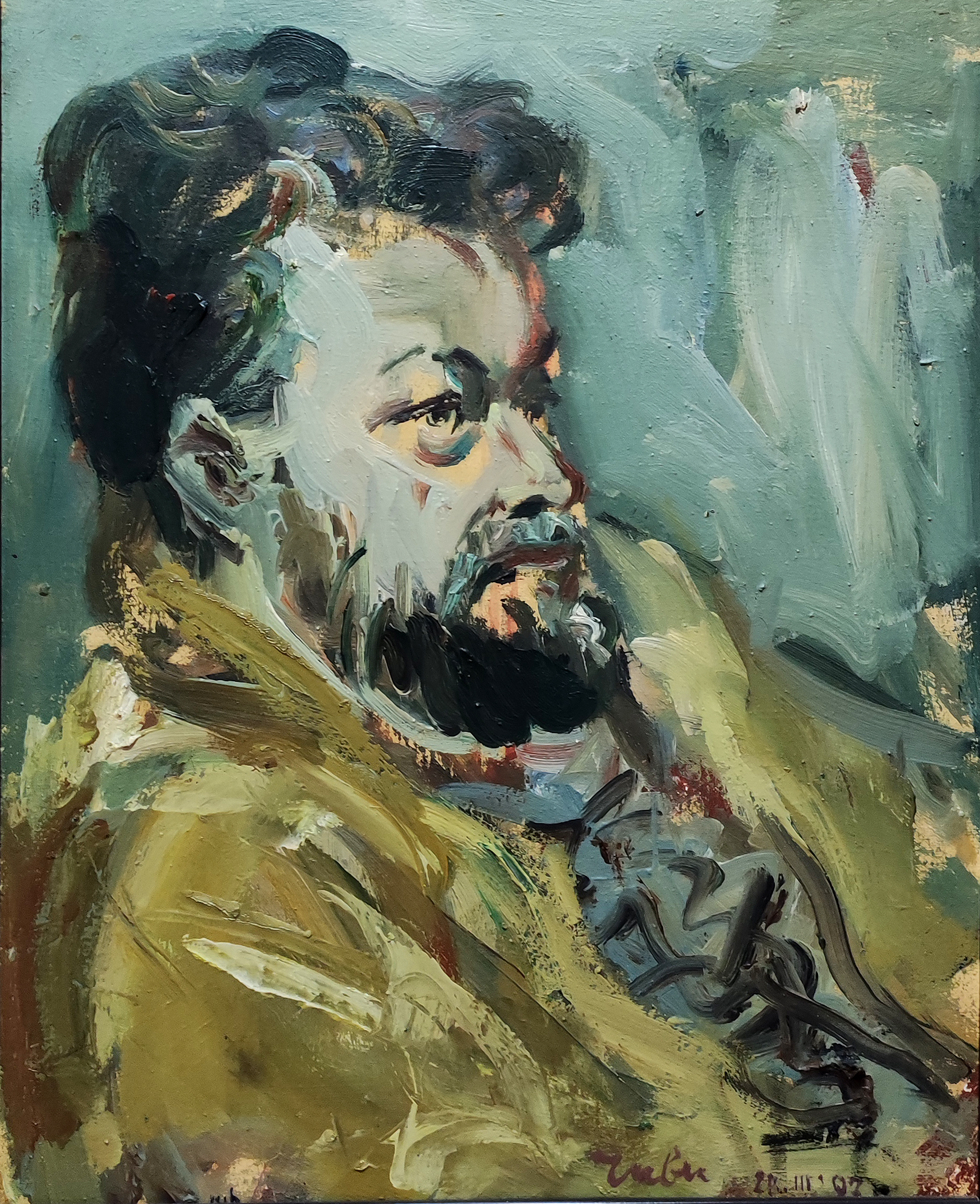
Portrait of Backo Dimitrijević, oil on canvas, 1997

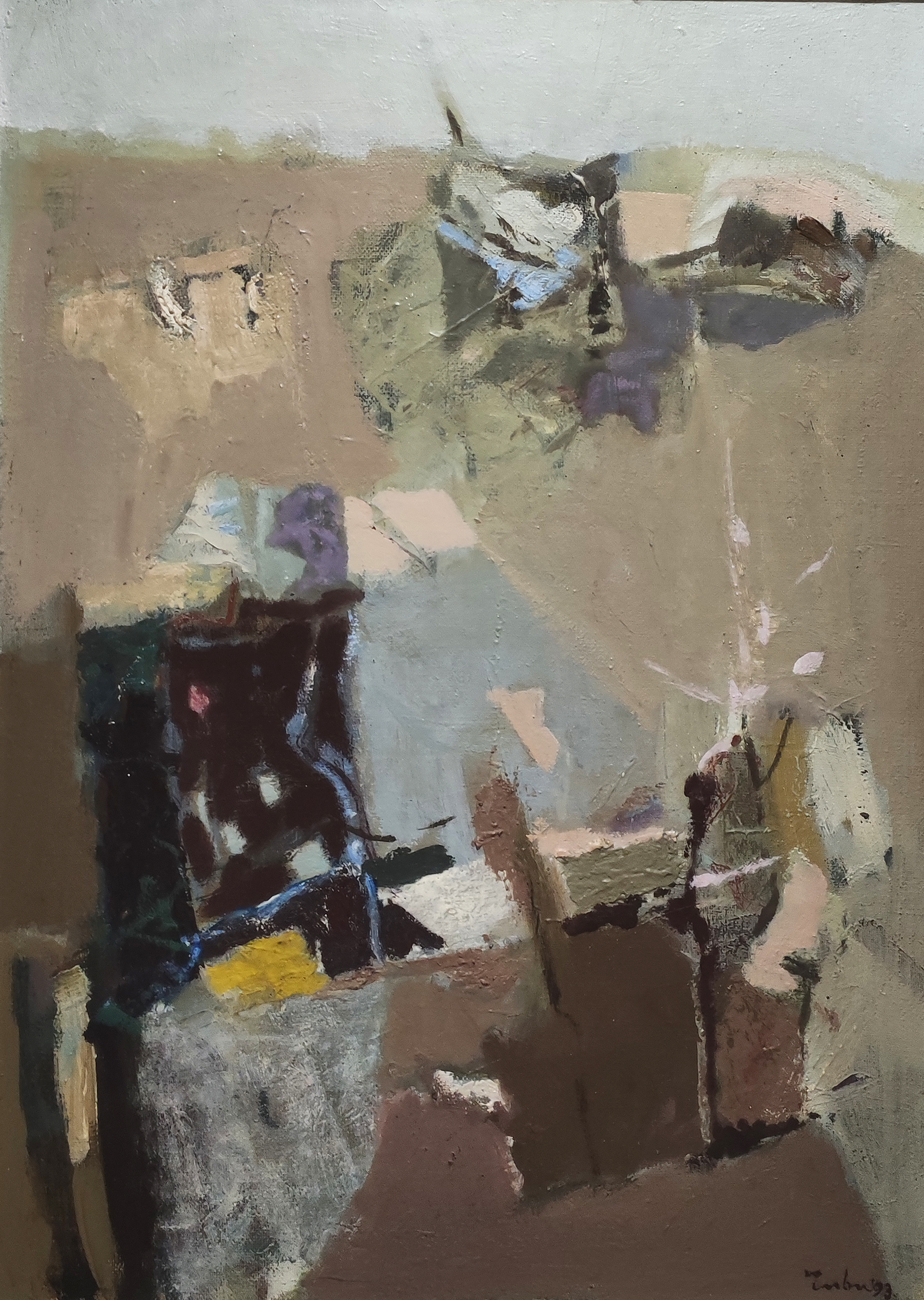
Untitled, oil on canvas, 1993

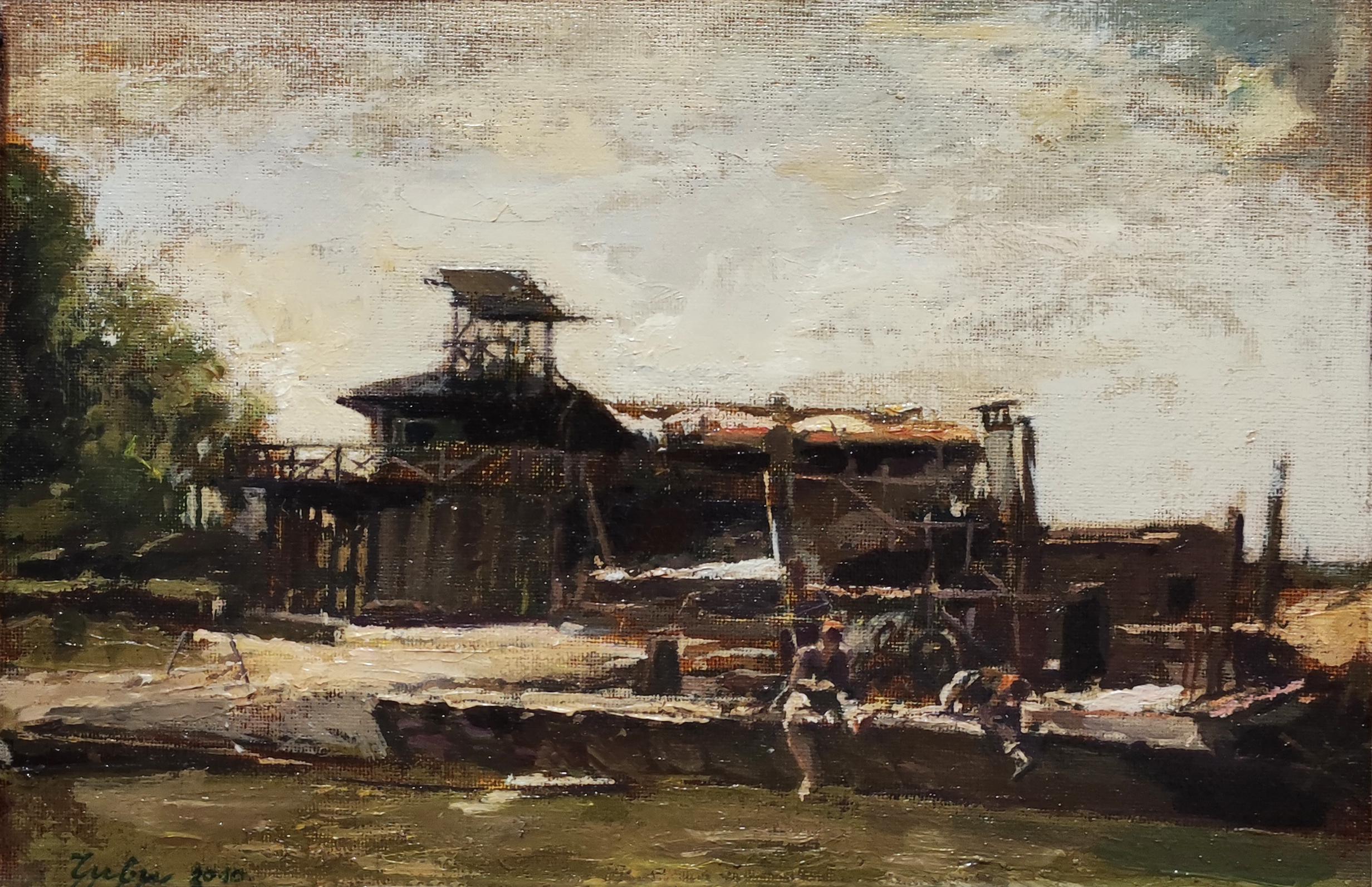
Oil on canvas, 2010

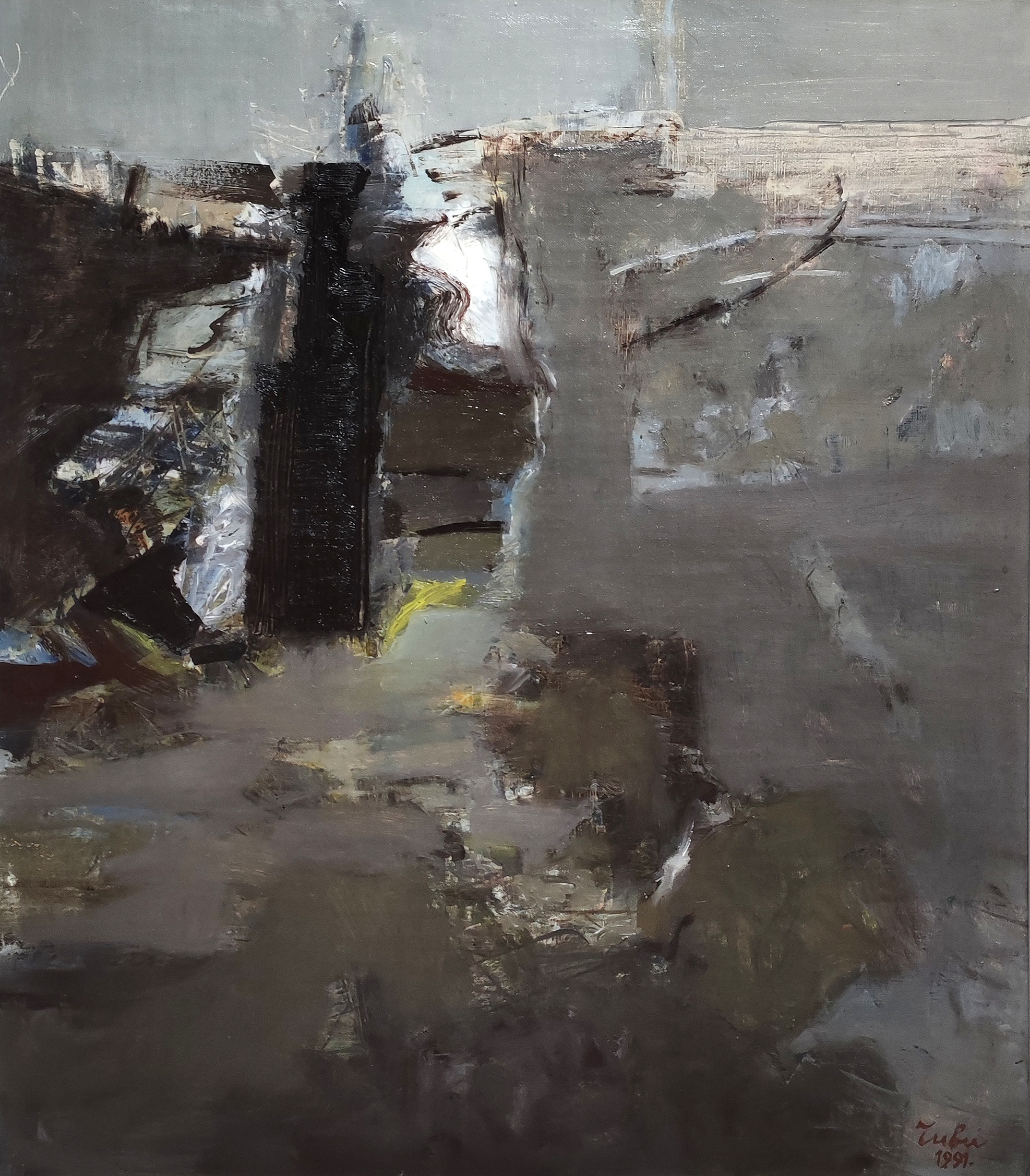
Oil on canvas, 1991

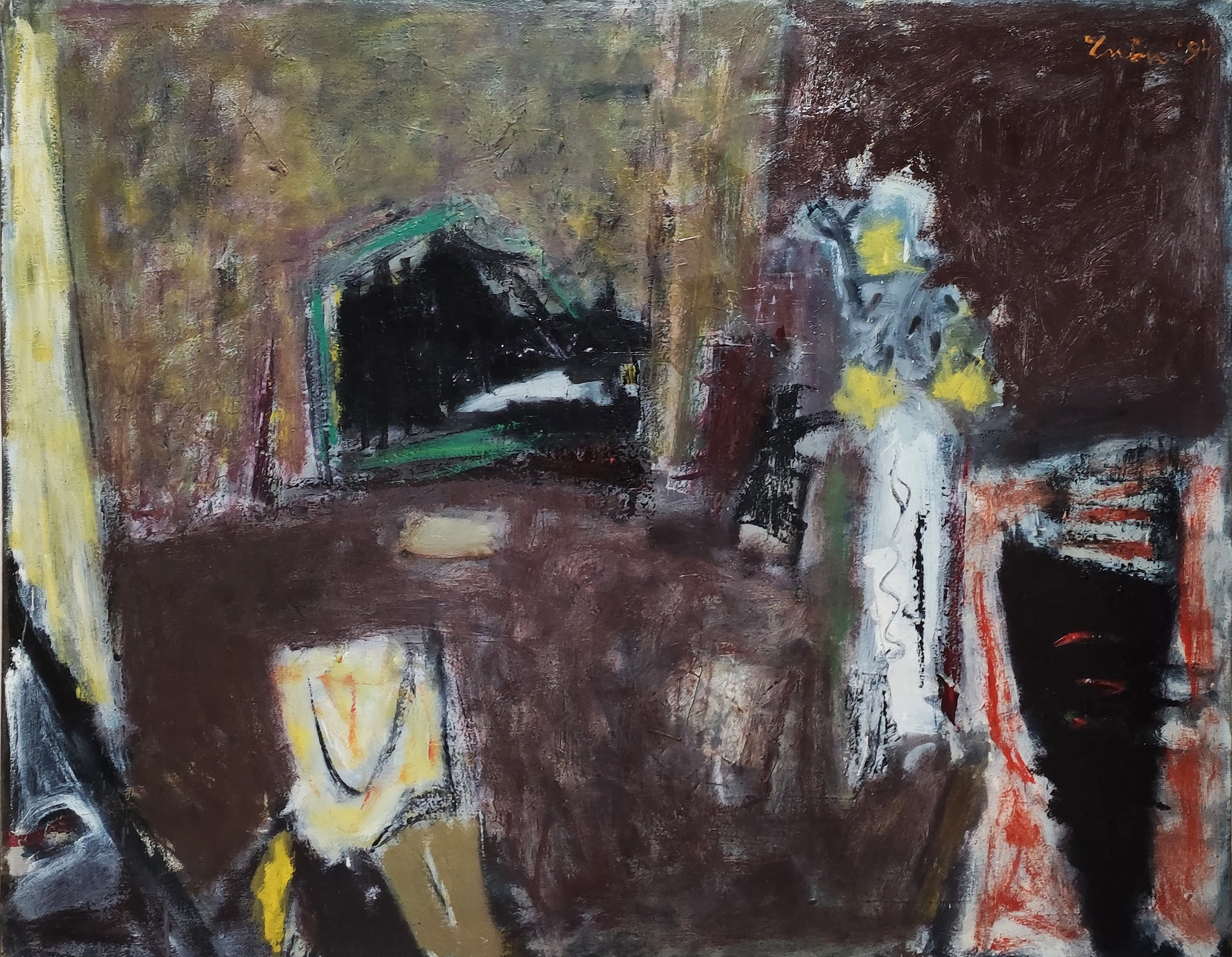
From the Interior, oil on canvas, 1994

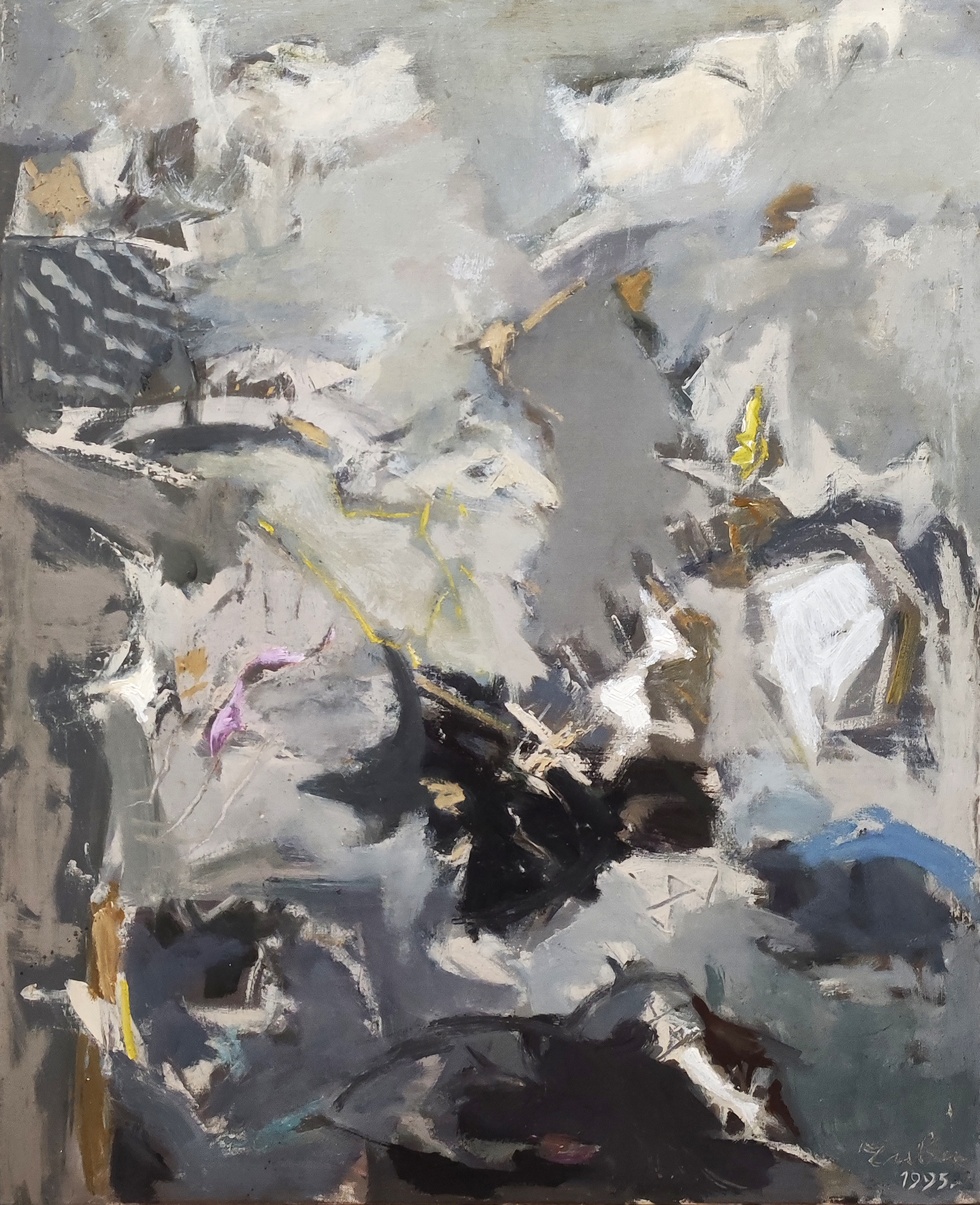
Cracks of the World, oil on canvas, 1995

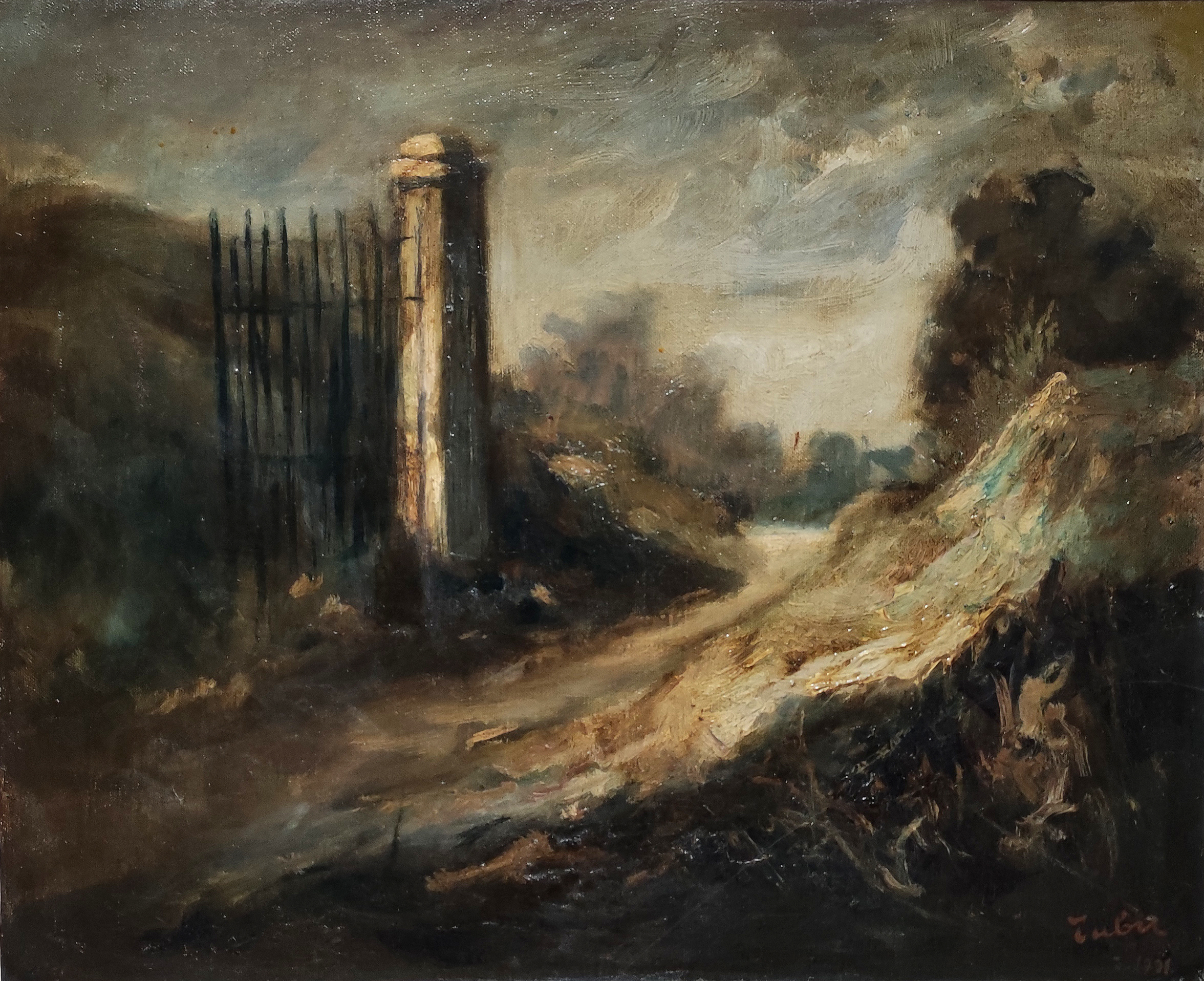
Northern Gate of the Niš Fortress, oil on canvas, 1991

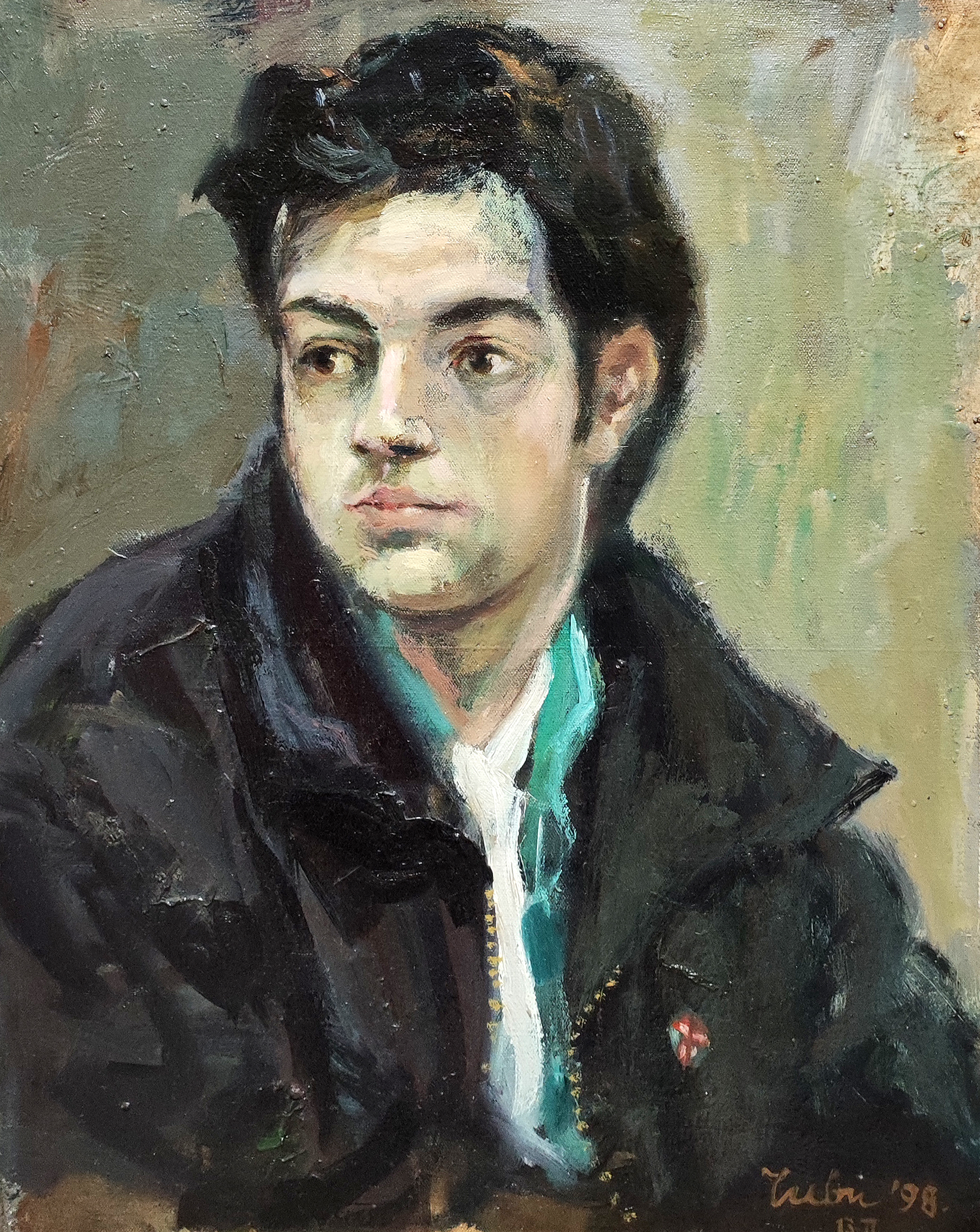
Portrait of the Artist's Son Nikola Stanković, oil on canvas, 1998

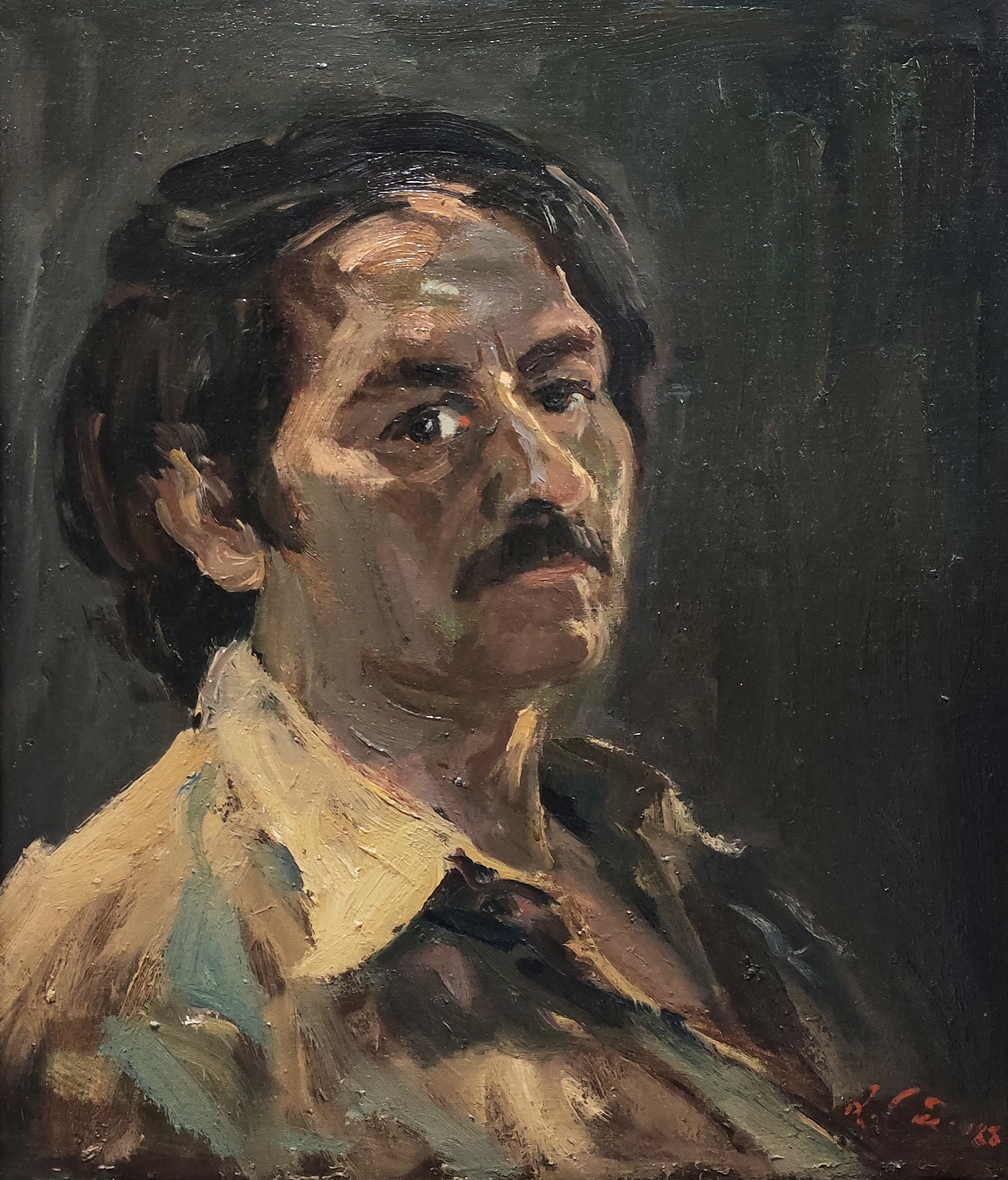
Self-portrait, oil on canvas, 1988

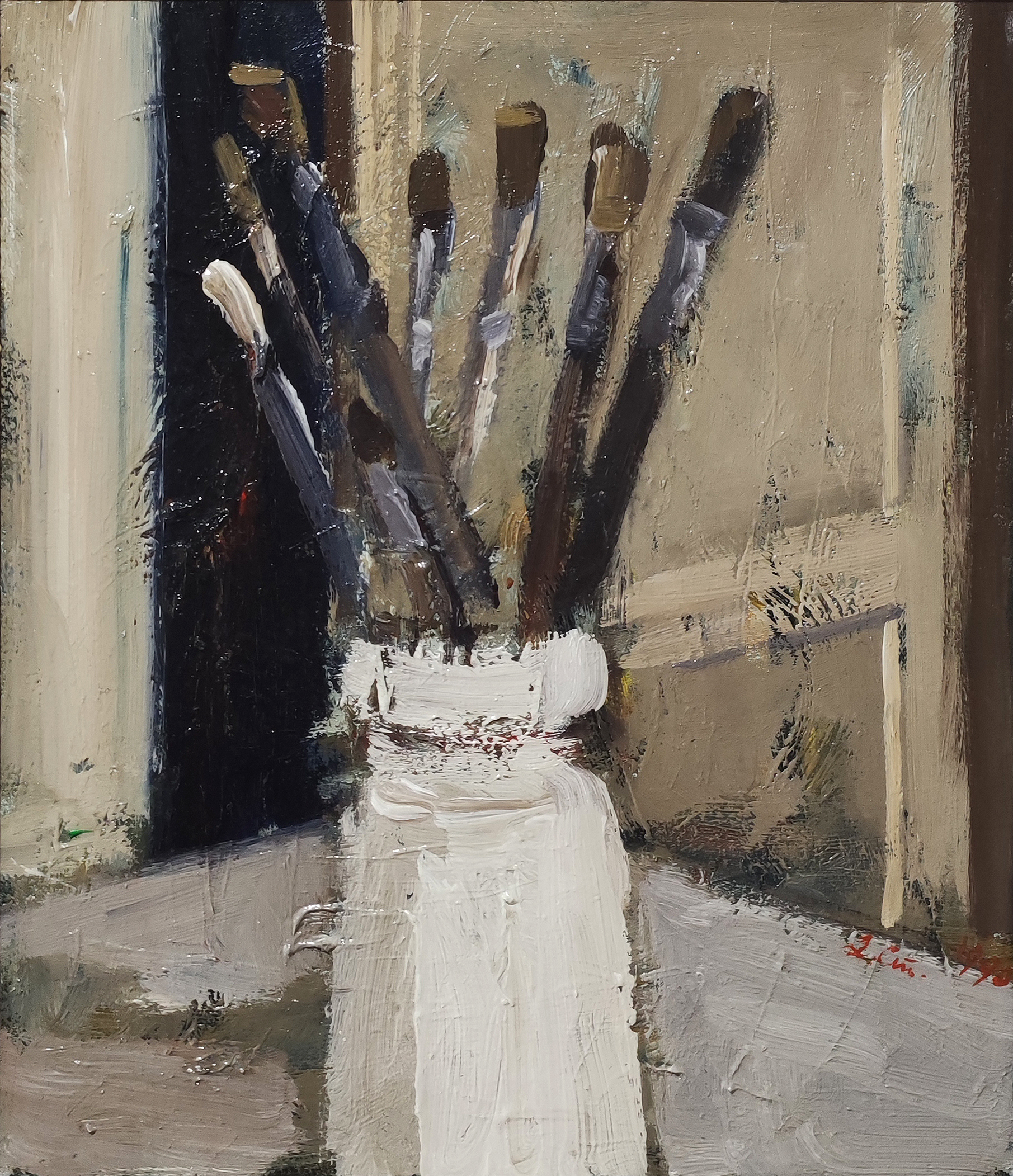
Brushes, oil on canvas, 1990

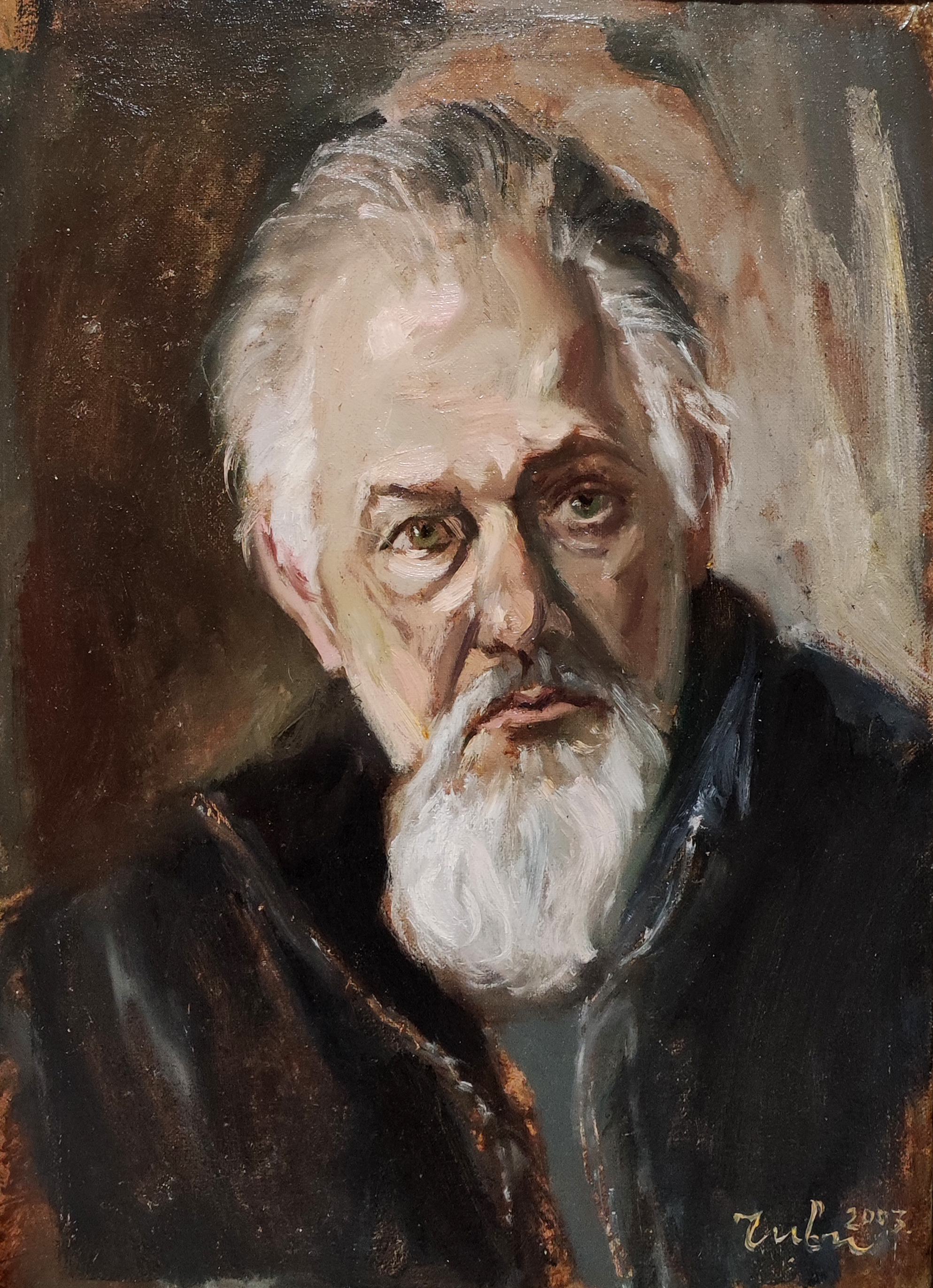
Portrait of Slobodan Popović Pop, oil on canvas, 2003

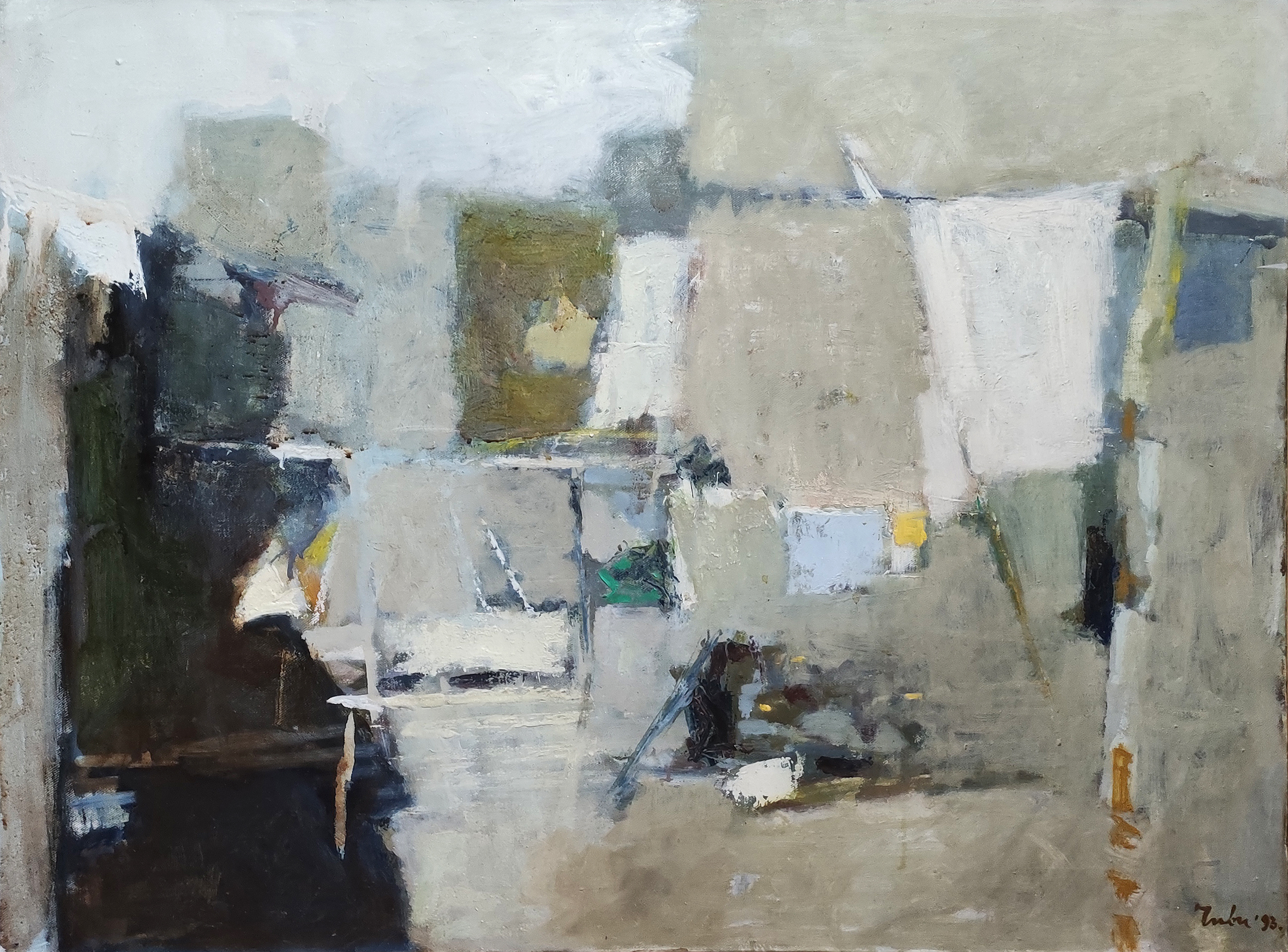
Morning, oil on canvas, 1991

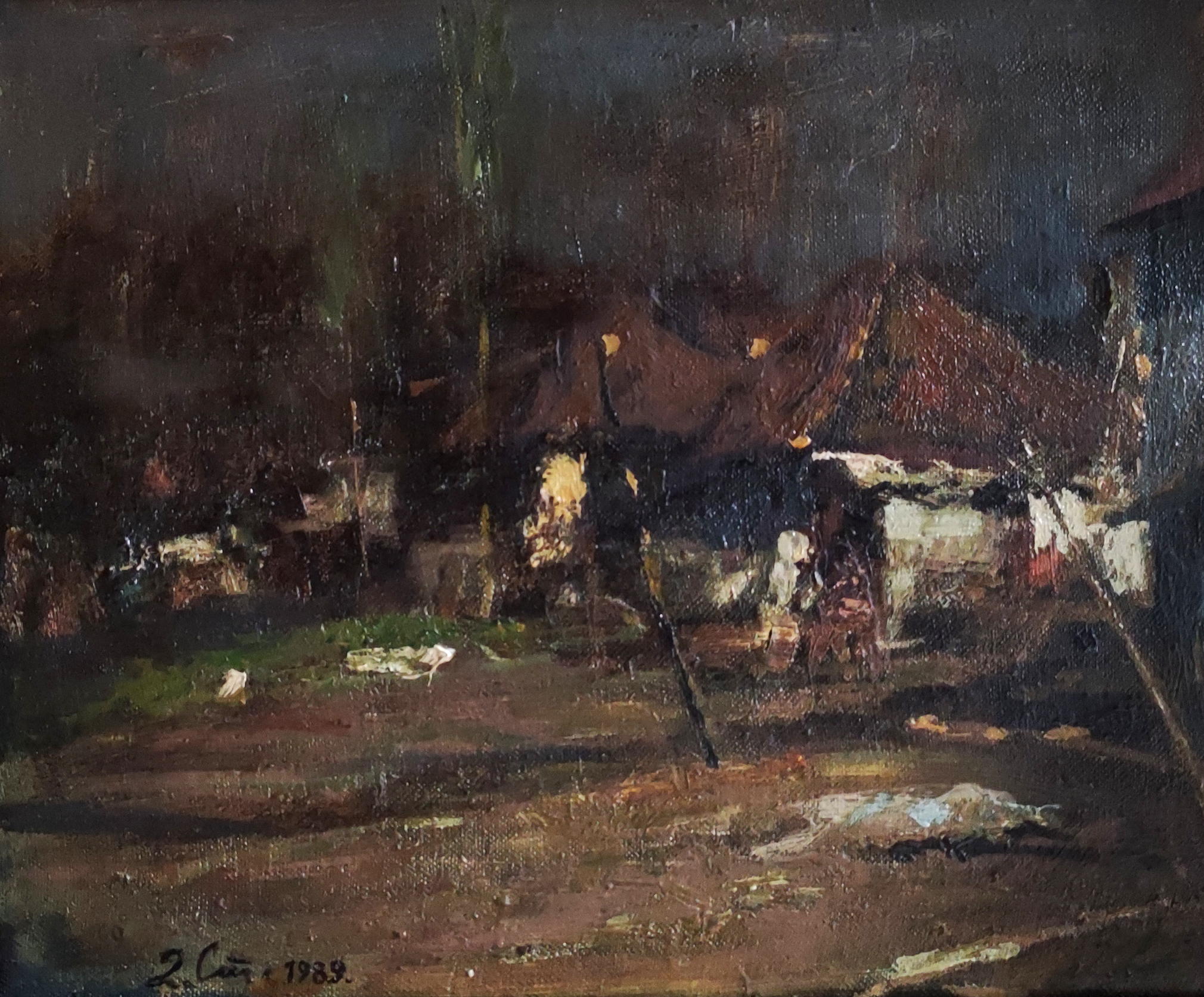
Old Houses, oil on canvas, 1989

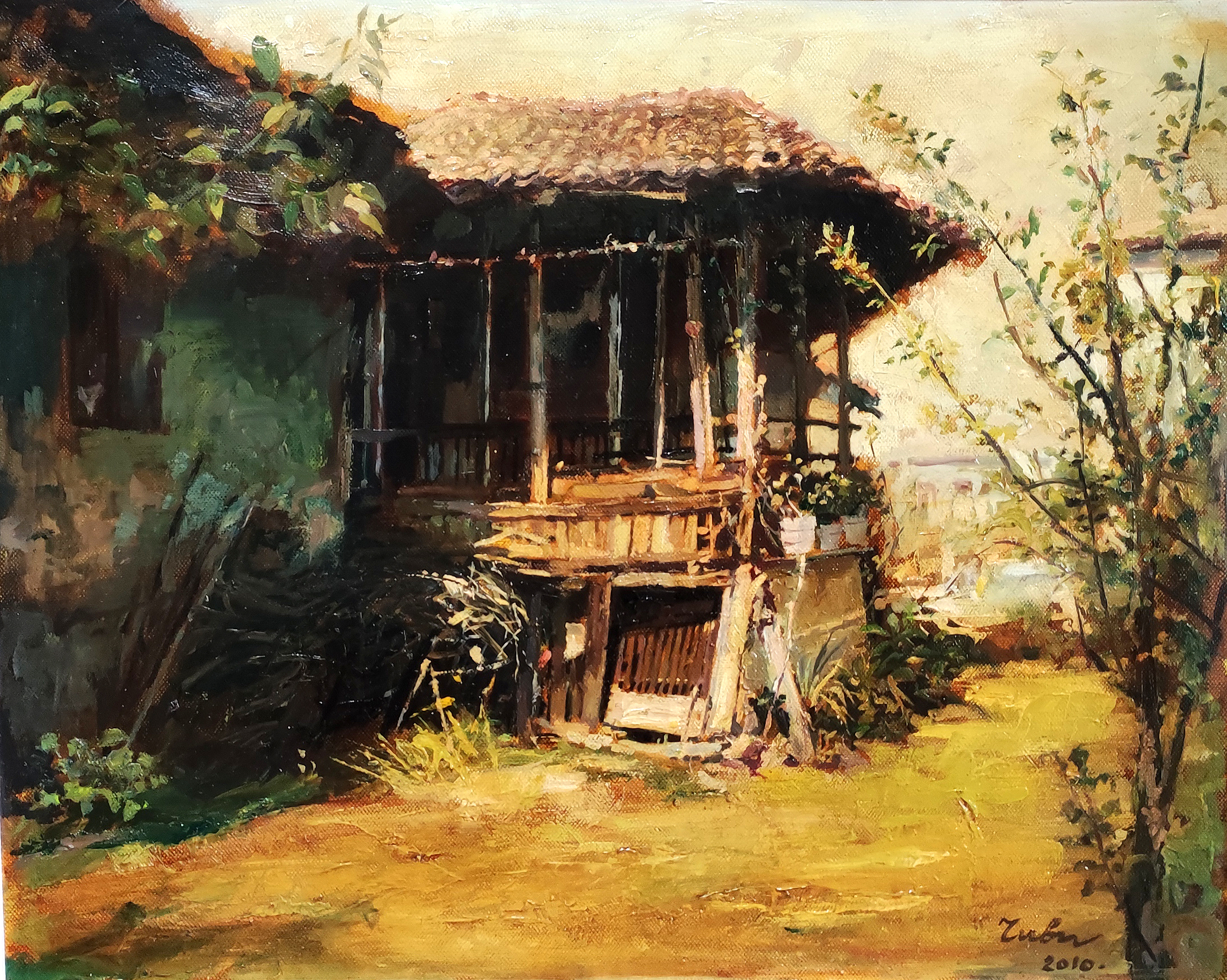
Old House on Hisar, oil on canvas, 2010
