= Miloš Bajić (painter) =

Serbian painter (1915–1995)

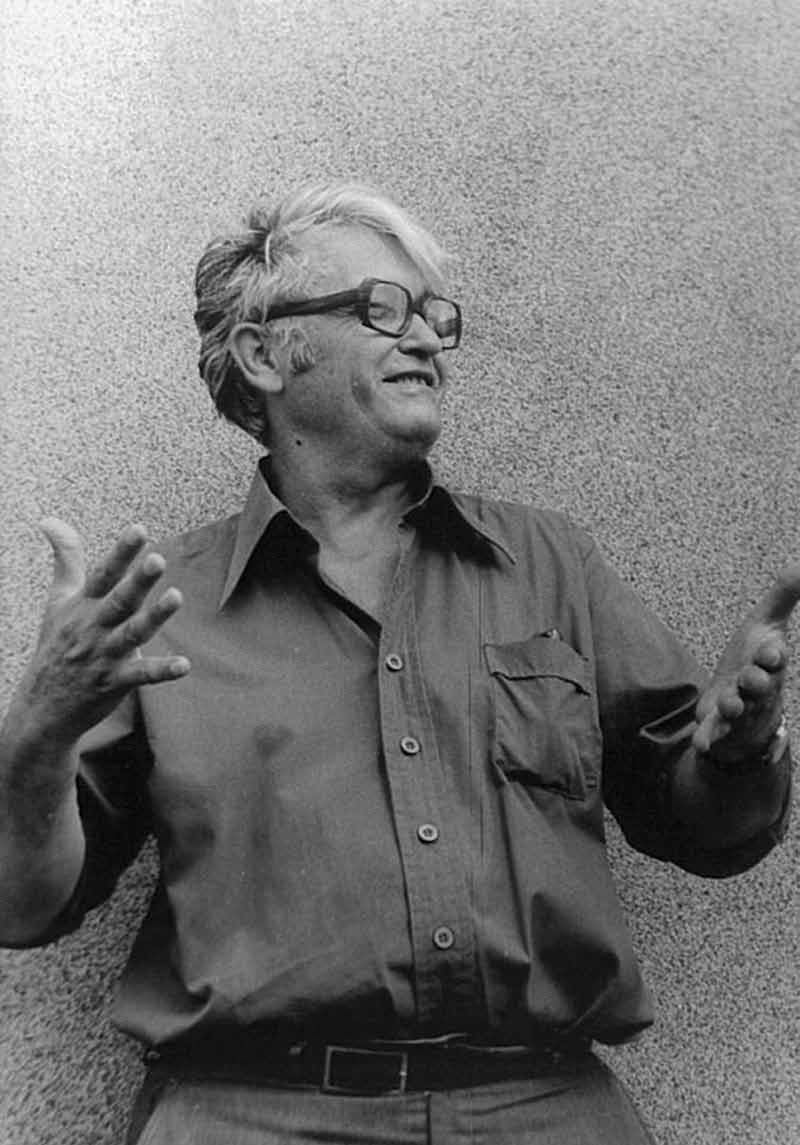
- Born: 1915; Resanovci, Condominium of Bosnia and Herzegovina, Austria-Hungary
- Died: 1995 (aged 79–80) (Federal Republic of Yugoslavia) Belgrade, FR Yugoslavia
- Education: University of Arts in Belgrade, Belgrade, Federal Republic of Yugoslavia
- Known for: Painting, Drawing, Mosaic, Fresco
- Movement: Modernism

Miloš Bajić (Serbian Cyrillic: Милош Бајић; 1915–1995) was a Serbian Modernist painter, who is considered to be the founder of abstract painting in Yugoslavia.

== Early life ==
Miloš Bajić was born in 1915 in Resanovci, a village in the Condominium of Bosnia and Herzegovina in Austria-Hungary (now Bosnia and Herzegovina). In 1922, Bajić moved to Belgrade, the capital of Yugoslavia (now Serbia), where he completed grammar school and teacher school. As a student, he published illustrations and caricatures in the daily Politika and satirical magazine Ošišani jež. In 1935, Bajić became one of Petar Dobrović's students, finishing his first year in Beta Vukanović's class at the Belgrade School of Arts in 1937.

== World War II ==
After Kingdom of Yugoslavia was invaded by the Axis powers of Germany, Italy, Hungary, and Bulgaria in 1941, Bajić joined the Partisans, Yugoslav anti-Nazi resistance movement. Occupying forces captured him in Belgrade in October 1942 and imprisoned him in Banjica Concentration Camp. In September 1944, he was transferred to Mauthausen concentration camp.

While in detention, Bajić captured the scenes from prison life as drawings. and later said about his work:

"In the concentration camp, drawing was my way of daring fate. I would draw on any piece of paper I could get hold of, using a pencil not bigger than a baby finger. I did this secretly, risking my life. I hid the drawings inside my shirt, under my bed, or I would bury them underground. One day, I noticed a fire extinguisher bottle. I emptied it next evening and hid my drawings inside. At midnight, I buried the bottle. When the camp was liberated, I excavated the drawings."

After the liberation of the camp by American forces, Bajić returned to Belgrade with about 150 drawings and continued his education at University of Arts in Belgrade.

== Later years ==
In 1949, he graduated from the Academy of Arts in Belgrade in the class of Milo Milunović, Ivan Tabaković, and Nedeljko Gvozdenović. After finishing his specialist training with Marko Čelebonović, he became one of the first assistant professors at the Belgrade Academy of Arts and worked as a professor until he retired in 1979.

He was a member of the groups “Independent” (1951–55) and "The December Group" (1955-60), which used modernism as a way of fighting socialist realism. He had his first individual exhibition at the ULUS Gallery in Belgrade in 1952.

He participated in founding the Art Colony in Bačka Topola (1953). This is where he completed his first large format mosaic and obelisk dedicated to the space conquest. His later work is characterised by numerous mosaics and fresco paintings (compositions in space), and particularly the memorial construction Partisan Necropolis in Resanovci (1971). In 1967, he exhibited for the first time the new cycle of large format Mauthausen paintings, inspired by the drawings he made during his time in the concentration camp.

In 1975, Bajić published the monograph “Mauthausen 106621”. In the preface, he said:

"Let the youth, unaware of the tragic of the times past, or its life, direct their endless enthusiasm towards the furthest stars, but never again back to the times we endured."

== Family ==
His son is the film director Darko Bajić.
