= Uroš Bajić =

Serbian politician (born 1992)

Uroš Bajić (Serbian Cyrillic: Урош Бајић; born 1992) is a politician in Serbia. He has served in the Assembly of Vojvodina since 2020 as a member of the Serbian Progressive Party.

== Early life and private career ==
Bajić was born in Novi Sad, Vojvodina, Republic of Serbia, in the year that the Socialist Federal Republic of Yugoslavia was replaced by the Federal Republic of Yugoslavia. He studied at the University of Novi Sad Faculty of Philosophy in the Department of History, worked at the Cogitatum Center as a policy assistant, and was active with the Konrad Adenauer Foundation in 2015–16. He also holds a bachelor's degree in management.

== Politician ==
Bajić received the 109th position (out of 120) on the Progressive Party's electoral list in the 2016 Vojvodina provincial election. He was the youngest candidate on list. His position was too low for election to be a realistic prospect, and indeed he was not elected even as the list won a majority victory with sixty-three out of 120 mandates. He was promoted to the fifty-fourth position on the party's Aleksandar Vučić — For Our Children list in the 2020 provincial election and was elected when the list won an increased majority with seventy-six seats.

In October 2020, he was chosen as chair of the assembly committee on youth and sports. He is also a member of the committee on culture and public information.
