= Milena Bajić =

Montenegrin basketball player

No. 31 – NJIT Highlanders
- Position: Power forward / center
- League: ASUN Conference

Personal information
- Born: 13 November 1996 (age 30) Podgorica, FR Yugoslavia
- Listed height: 1.85 m (6 ft 1 in)
- Listed weight: 74 kg (163 lb)

Career information
- College: Memphis (2015–2017); NJIT (2017–present)
- Playing career: 2010–present

Career history
- 2010–2015: Budućnost Podgorica

Milena Bajić (Serbian: Милена Бајић; born 13 November 1996) is a Montenegrin college basketball player for the New Jersey Institute of Technology.

== Memphis and NJIT statistics ==
Source

== Table Ratios and Totals ==
Ratios
Year	Team	GP	FG%	3P%	FT%	RBG	APG	BPG	SPG	PPG
2015-16	Memphis	18	50.0%	40.0%	90.0%	1.06	0.33	0.11	0.17	1.61
2016-17	Memphis	28	36.5%	10.0%	47.4%	2.39	0.21	0.25	0.39	2.00
2017-18	NJIT	Sat due to NCAA transfer rules								
2018-19	NJIT	30	39.0%	29.3%	56.5%	5.07	1.17	0.90	0.57	6.47
2019-20	NJIT	21	37.2%	25.6%	74.5%	5.91	1.29	0.76	0.67	6.91
Career		97	38.5%	26.3%	65.1%	3.73	0.76	0.54	0.46	4.37

Totals
Year	Team	GP	FG	FGA	3P	3PA	FT	FTA	REB	A	BK	ST	PTS
2015-16	Memphis	18	9	18	2	5	9	10	19	6	2	3	29
2016-17	Memphis	28	23	63	1	10	9	19	67	6	7	11	56
2017-18	NJIT	Sat due to NCAA transfer rules											
2018-19	NJIT	30	78	200	12	41	26	46	152	35	27	17	194
2019-20	NJIT	21	48	129	11	43	38	51	124	27	16	14	145
Career		97	158	410	26	99	82	126	362	74	52	45	424

== Personal life ==
Milena is daughter of Darko and Gordana Bajić, business finance major.
