= Resanovci =

Resanovci Ресановци
- Village
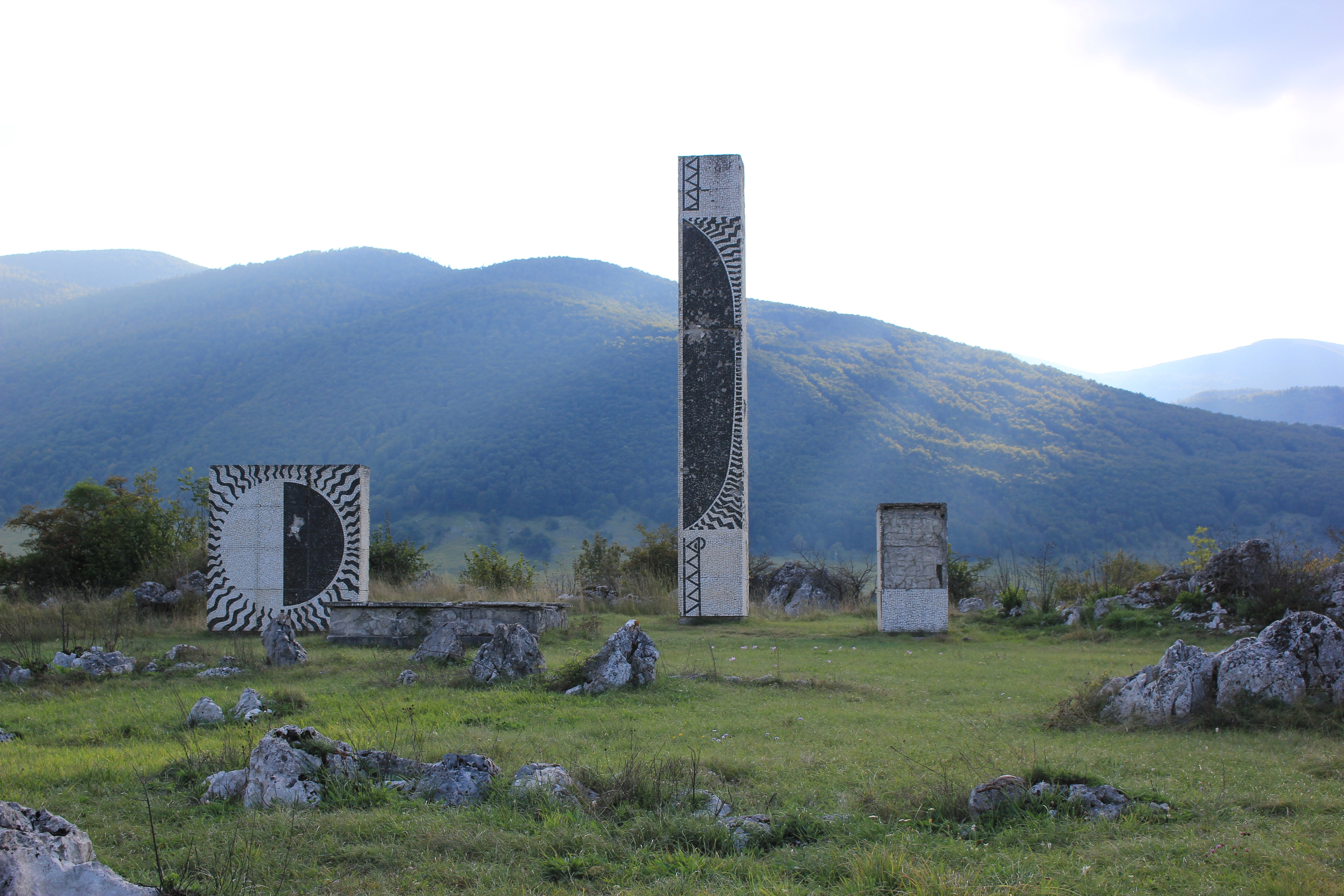
- Monument of the Yugoslav Liberation Struggle in Resanovci

- Location within Bosnia and Herzegovina
- Coordinates: 44°18′N 16°18′E
- Country: Bosnia and Herzegovina
- Entity: Federation of Bosnia and Herzegovina
- Canton: Canton 10
- Municipality: Bosansko Grahovo

Area
  - Total: 56.70 km^{2} (21.89 sq mi)

Population (2013)
  - Total: 102
  - Density: 1.80/km^{2} (4.66/sq mi)
- Time zone: UTC+1 (CET)
  - Summer (DST): UTC+2 (CEST)

Resanovci (Serbian Cyrillic: Ресановци) is a village in the Municipality of Bosansko Grahovo in Canton 10 of the Federation of Bosnia and Herzegovina, an entity of Bosnia and Herzegovina.

== Demographics ==
According to the 2013 census, its population was 102.

Ethnicity in 2013
Ethnicity	Number	Percentage
Serbs	99	97.1%
other/undeclared	3	2.9%
Total	102	100%

== Bibliography ==
- Ethnicity/National Affiliation, Religion and Mother Tongue (PDF). Sarajevo: Agency for Statistics of Bosnia and Herzegovina. 2019.
