= Stefan Bajic (footballer, born 1997) =

Montenegrin football player

Personal information
- Date of birth: 11 September 1997 (age 29)
- Place of birth: Fiorenzuola d'Arda, Italy
- Height: 1.91 m (6 ft 3 in)
- Position: Right back

Team information
- Current team: Campodarsego

Youth career
- Piacenza
- Parma
- Pro Piacenza
- Cremonese

Senior career*
Years	Team	Apps	(Gls)
2016–2019	Cremonese	0	(0)
2016–2017	→ Triestina (loan)	25	(6)
2017–2018	→ Trapani (loan)	2	(0)
2018	→ Triestina (loan)	4	(0)
2018–2019	→ Pro Piacenza (loan)	0	(0)
2019	Fiorenzuola	4	(0)
2019–2021	Cattolica SM	22	(1)
2021	Borgosesia	16	(1)
2021	Borgo San Donnino	12	(0)
2022	Prato	18	(1)
2022	Grosseto	0	(0)
2022–2023	Crema	20	(2)
2023–	Campodarsego	21	(1)

International career
2013	Serbia U17	2	(0)
2015	Montenegro U18	4	(0)
2016	Montenegro U19	2	(0)
2016–2017	Montenegro U21	3	(0)
- * Club domestic league appearances and goals as of 15 March 2024

Stefan Bajic (Serbian Cyrillic: Стефан Бајић, romanized: Stefan Bajić; born 11 September 1997) is a professional footballer who plays as a right-back for Serie D Group C club Campodarsego. Born in Italy, he represented both Serbia and Montenegro at youth level.

== Club career ==
Bajic made his Serie C debut for Trapani on 1 December 2017 in a game against Catania.

On 3 September 2019, he joined Serie D side Fiorenzuola and he moved to Borgo San Donnino in summer 2021. He later played for Prato and was presented as a Grosseto player in summer 2022.
