= Stanojlo Petrović =

Serbian officer

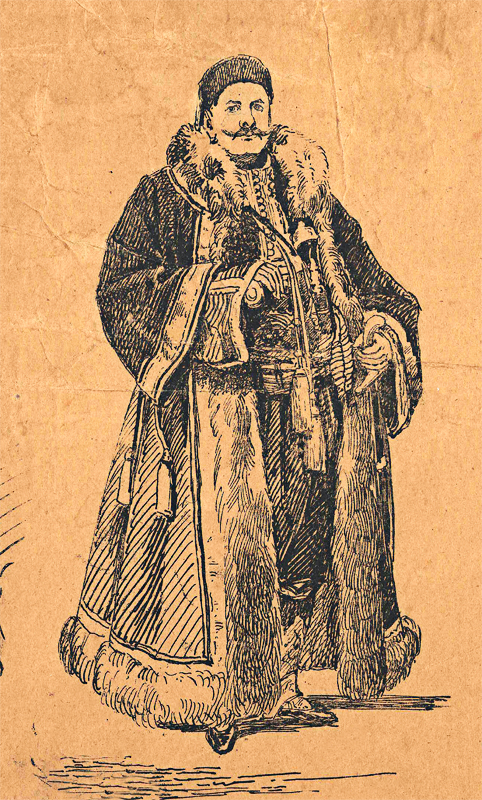
Petrović circa 1860

Stanojlo Petrović (Serbian Cyrillic: Станојло Петровић; 13 February 1813 – 1893) was a Serbian officer, court secretary, advisor, and adjutant to both Prince Miloš Obrenović and his son Mihailo Obrenović III. Petrović and his wife Draginja were among the first public philanthropists in Serbia, and may be regarded as the founders of St. Nicholas Church in the New Cemetery in Belgrade.

== Early life ==
Stanojlo Petrović was born in Svine in the Braničevo District of Serbia on 13 February 1813 to an old Serbian family which rose to distinction and imperial favour in the 18th century. Several of its members attained high rank in the army and in civil administration. As a youth, Petrović showed no desire to emulate his ancestors. He studied just enough on the day of 26 February 1826 to qualify for cadet school in Požarevac and four years later in 1830, he was promoted to the rank of Lieutenant. In Požarevac from 1833 and on he was a military commissioner and was in charge of the Palace Guard in the Principality of Serbia. For the next few years, he led the commonplace life of a fashionable officer of the Guards.

== 1835 Constitution ==
During this period, the people of Serbia often rebelled against Miloš's autocratic and often harsh rule. Following one such rebellion, Miloš agreed to adopt a constitution in 1835. The move was opposed by neighbouring Austria, the ruling Ottoman Empire and by Imperial Russia. It is believed that the three great powers of the day saw the Serbian constitution as a danger to their own autocratic systems of government. Klemens von Metternich's Austria particularly ridiculed the fact that Serbia had its own flag and ministry of foreign affairs. Finally, Miloš was forced to abolish the constitution at the demand of Russia and Turkey.

In 1839, Prince Miloš, the man who secured Serbia's autonomy from the Ottoman sultan, was now forced to abdicate and relinquish his throne in favor of his firstborn Milan Obrenović II who by then was terminally ill and died after just one month later. His younger brother Mihailo Obrenović III came to the throne as a minor, having been born in 1823, and acclaimed the title of Prince on 25 June 1839 upon the abdication of his father and death of his elder brother. Also in 1839, Court influence secured for Stanojlo Petrović the appointment of assistant to the Governor-General of the Požarevac district. It is said that in that position he gave evidence of so much natural ability and tact that in 1840 when Mihailo was declared of full age, Captain Stanojlo Petrović was elevated to the rank of Major and made adjutant to the young prince by the abdicating monarch himself. Few thrones appeared more secure and Mihailo's rule might have endured throughout his life but for his want of energy and inattention to the signs of the times. At the time, many of Stanojlo Petrović's colleagues (Ilija Garašanin, Stevan Knićanin, Toma Vučić Perišić) joined the opposition as Constitutionalists and supporters of the rival Aleksandar Karađorđević of the Karađorđević dynasty. Stanojlo Petrović, however, remained a steadfast supporter of the Obrenović dynasty, honoring the oath he took.

== Defenders of the Constitution ==
In 1842, Mihailo's reign came to a halt when he was overthrown by a rebellion known as the Defenders of the Constitution led by Toma Vučić Perišić. This enabled the Karađorđević dynasty to accede to the Serbian throne. After Mihailo Obrenović was deposed and exiled, the family was out of power until 1858. Meanwhile, Stanojlo Petrović stayed in Belgrade and continued to correspond secretly with the deposed monarch and his father to have the usurpers removed from their posts and have Mihailo returned to his rightful place. The correspondence fell into the hands of the governing body and Stanojlo was afterwards tried and sent to prison for 10 years in Knjaževac in the notorious dungeon called Gurgušovačka kula. After two years in solitary confinement and with the help of Russian diplomats, Stanojlo Petrović was released on 17 July 1844 along with a few more Obrenović loyalists who were all pardoned by now-Prince Aleksandar Karađorđević.

== Revolutions of 1848 ==
During the Hungarian Revolution of 1848, the Hungarians demanded national rights and autonomy within the Austrian Empire. However, they did not recognize the national rights of the Serbs and their lands, then part of Hungarian dependent territory.

As part of the Revolutions of 1848, the Serbs under Austria-Hungary demanded what they had in the previous century: recognition of Serbian as an official language, equality of the Orthodox church as with Catholics and annual church assembly gatherings. Several thousand Serbs met at the May Assembly in Sremski Karlovci on 1 May 1848. The delegates chose prominent Austrian Serb general Stevan Šupljikac as the civil and military commander. Josif Rajačić was chosen as patriarch. Rajačić supported General Josip Jelačić who took an oath to become the counsel of Austrian Emperor Ferdinand I before the hostilities escalated. The Patriarch Rajačić actually served as second in command and gained the desired concessions from the Austrians for Serbian support. The Serbs demanded a national unit consisting of Banat, Bačka, Baranja and part of Srem which would become known collectively as Serbian Vojvodina. This was completely against the Hungarian authorities' visions. They refused the Serbian demands.

From May 1848 onward, the Serbs of Vojvodina directly sought aid from the Principality of Serbia and on 10 May, head of the main committee General Đorđe Stratimirović appealed to Prince Aleksandar of Serbia for assistance and urged Stevan Knićanin and Major Stanojlo Petrović to intercede. Knićanin was then elected military commander. In the year 1848, Prince Aleksandar called on volunteers to go help Serbs in Vojvodina who revolted against Hungarian repression. Hungarians were not positive towards the Serbs at this time but support came from the new Austrian emperor Franz Joseph I who approved the establishment of Serbian Vojvodina along with Stevan Šupljikac as Duke (Vojvoda). Stanojlo (who headed the army of Požarevac at the time and served as adjutant to the commander of the Montenegrin regiment) was sent by Prince Aleksandar Karađorđević to aid the Serbs in Vojvodina. Some three thousand Serbian soldier volunteers on 15 December 1848 crossed the Danube river and went to Pančevo where Vojvoda Stevan Šupljikac welcomed them. As a result of the Hungarian Revolution of 1848, the autonomous region of Serbian Vojvodina was established and approved by Franz Joseph, the titular emperor of the Holy Roman Empire at the time. Stevan Šupljikac became the supreme military commander of the Serbian troops on 6 October 1848.

In 1848, Stanojlo Petrović volunteered in the Šajkaš Battalion commanded by Vojvoda Đorđe Stratimirović and participated in many battles, including the battles of Mošorin and Vilovo. The Šajkaši was a specific kind of Austrian army which moved in a narrow, longboat known as a chaika. These military units operated on the Danube, Tisa, Sava and Moriš rivers. Petrović also participated in other battles near Pančevo and Vršac which were commanded by his friend Stevan Knićanin.

== Marriage ==
Petrović was named commander of the army of Čačak on 30 March 1850. That same year, he married Draginja Radovanović, the daughter of a wealthy merchant from Mostar, Herzegovina. Together, they had a son named Petar. In 1854, Petrović was sent to Kragujevac where he assumed the post of governor of the region. The following year, his son died. Two years later (1857), because of a disagreement with the military commander Jovan Lukačević, Petrović asked for a transfer and became commissioner of the Smederevo district, a post held previously by Stevan Knićanin in 1839.

== Saint Andrew's Day Assembly ==
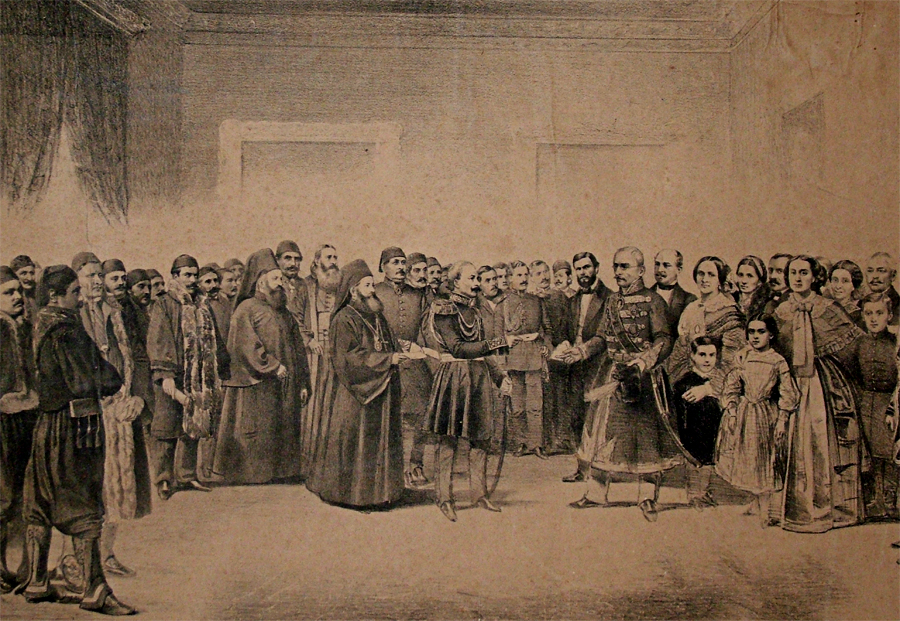
In Bucharest on 3 January 1859, Petrović presented the former and future Knez Miloš with the letter of the National Assembly

During the Saint Andrew's Day Assembly in 1858, Stevča Mihailović was the leader of the Obrenović faction and led the delegation that demanded the abdication of Prince Aleksandar Karađorđević. After the return of Miloš in 1858, Stevča Mihailović became president of the Privy Council of Serbia, with Stanojlo Petrović as secretary.

In Belgrade, the national parliament was held in which Aleksandar Karađorđevic was dismissed in favor of Miloš Obrenović who was chosen as a prince. With Miloš Obrenović restored as a prince, a delegation was chosen to go to Bucharest to ask Miloš and Mihailo Obrenović to return to Serbia. Stanojlo was chosen as the leader of the delegation. After the return of Miloš in 1858, Stevča Mihailović became president of the Privy Council. On 3 January 1859, Stanojlo Petrović presented the former and current monarch Miloš Obrenović with the decree from the National Parliament. Prince Miloš immediately promoted Stanojlo to adjutant and government advisor (Privy Council) as well as Deputy Minister of External Affairs. Miloš died a year later in 1860.

Finally, Mihailo was accepted back as Prince of Serbia in September 1860, after the death of his father who had regained the throne in 1858. For the next eight years, he ruled as an enlightened absolute monarch. During Mihailo's second reign, the People's Assembly was convened just three times – in 1861, 1864 and 1867. Prince Mihailo's greatest achievement was in persuading the Turkish garrisons to leave Serbia in 1862 (when the Ottoman Army left the fortresses of Užice and Soko Grad) and 1867 (when the Turks left their fortifications in Belgrade, Šabac, Smederevo and Kladovo). With Stanojlo Petrović and other close advisors to the prince, this was done with major diplomatic support from Russia and Austria. Serbs in the 1860s had a program for uniting Croats and Serbs in a single state, the ideal of a Balkan federation propagated by Prince Mihailo Obrenović and his advisors. In 1868, Mihailo Obrenović was assassinated.

In 1875 and from 1876 until 1878, Stevča Mihailović became the Prime Minister. This second Mihailović government led the country during the Herzegovina Uprising from 1875 to 1877 and the Serbian-Ottoman War from 1876 to 1878. It also led to Serbia's territorial expansion and independence at the Congress of Berlin. Stanojlo Petrović held various ministerial posts in the Mihailović Administration, and he continued to enjoy the favor of the sovereign throughout the reigns of Milan I of Serbia and Alexander I of Serbia.

== Benefactors ==
Petrović purchased a house in Belgrade. Stanojlo and Draginja Petrović became prominent figures in Belgrade society and friends of many authors, artists, tradesmen, scientists and politicians. The Draginja and Stanojlo Petrović Endowment supported more than 17 different charitable organizations. Petrović and his wife Draginja were among the first public benefactors in Belgrade, giving university scholarships to needy students attending the Velika škola's Faculty of Orthodox Theology.

Petrović was a member of the Privy Council of Serbia from 1858 until he retired in 1888 at the age of 75. After the establishment of Belgrade's New Cemetery in 1892, a cemetery church dedicated to St. Nicholas the Wonderworker was built according to the design of architect Svetozar Ivačković, inspired by Serbian medieval architecture. The founders and patrons of the church were Draginja and Stanojlo Petrović. Since it was located in the center of the cemetery, in the place from which four main routes extended radially, the Church of St. Nicholas became the epicenter and the symbolic focal point of the entire cemetery. After living for nearly eight years in retirement, Petrović died in Belgrade in 1893. He was buried in the St. Nicholas Church at Belgrade's New Cemetery with his long-deceased son Petar by his side.

== See also ==
- Luka Ćelović
- Đorđe Vajfert
- Miša Anastasijević
- Nikola Spasić
- Marija Trandafil
- Sava Tekelija
- Sava Vukovic (merchant)
