= Serbian Church Council of Karlovac Metropolitanate =

Institution of Serbs in Habsburg Monarchy

The Serbian People's Church Council of Karlovac Metropolitanate represented the most important institutions of Serbs in the Habsburg monarchy.

For more than two centuries (1708–1911), the Serbian Church Council in the Karlovac Metropolitanate not only elected archbishops, later patriarchs, but also made decisions on other questions – church-related, educational, and even on the purely political needs of the Serbs under Austro-Hungarian reign.

== Serbian National Church Council of the Karlovac Metropolitanate 1708–1911 ==
Sabor	Local	Date
Krusedol Sabor	Krusedol Monastery	1708
	Krusedol Monastery	1710
Sabor 1713	Sremski Karlovci	1713
	Sremski Karlovci	1714
	Sremski Karlovci	1715
	Sremski Karlovci	1716
	Sremski Karlovci	1717
	Dalj	1718
	Hopovo Monastery	1721
Sabor 1722	Petrovaradin trench	1722
Sabor 1726	Sremski Karlovci	1726
	Belgrade	1730
	Sremski Karlovci	1731
	Belgrade	1732
	Sremski Karlovci	1735
Sabor 1744	Sremski Karlovci	1744
Sabor 1748	Sremski Karlovci	1748
Sabor 1749	Sremski Karlovci	1749
Sabor 1769	Sremski Karlovci	1769
Sabor 1774	Sremski Karlovci	1774
Sabor 1780		1780
Sremski Karlovci		
Timisoara Sabor	Timisoara	1790
Sabor 1837	Sremski Karlovci	1837
		1839
Sabor 1842	Sremski Karlovci	1842
May Assembly	Sremski Karlovci	1848
Annunciation Council	Sremski Karlovci	1861
Sabor 1864	Sremski Karlovci	1864
Sabor 1865	Sremski Karlovci	1865
Sabor 1869	Sremski Karlovci	1869
		1870
		1871
		1872
		1874/1875
		1879
		1881
		1892
Sabor 1908	Sremski Karlovci	1908
	Sremski Karlovci	1910–1911

== Holding a parliament ==
The forerunner of the people's-church councils in the Habsburg monarchy is people's church council held in Belgrade 28 June 1690. At the time Great Viennese War, when the Austrian army withdrew from Serbia.

The first Serbian People's Church Council, after Sabor in Baji (1694), was held in 1708 in Krušedol Monastery, with the aim of electing a new archbishop. The parliament was opened by an envoy of the Austrian emperor, just as all the then class councils were opened by special imperial envoys or proxies. The members of this Council were, for the most part, church dignitaries. Later, the right to open this Parliament belonged to the Hungarian government, since the jurisdiction of the Karlovac Metropolitanate mainly extended to the lands of the crown of St. Stephen, for the most part in the Habsburg Kingdom of Hungary. In part, the jurisdiction of the metropolis extended to Bukovina. Thus, the Serbs of the Karlovac metropolitanate, on the one hand, were represented in the class councils of Hungarian Parliament, and on the other hand they were they also had their own representation in the People-Church Council, which became all the more significant as the number of secular members of that Council grew more.

Only in the first few Councils did the number of church persons prevail over the number of secular ones. In later times, it became common practice, and after that it was legalized, that in addition to the archbishop, bishop and the clergy, whose number was one third in all, two-thirds of the members of the Council were elected from the ranks of the laity. At that time, a constant number of members of the parliament was determined, as well as the manner in which they were elected. So it is with the People-Church Council which is 1749. In addition to 25 clergymen, 25 Krajina officers and 25 representatives of citizens and peasants from the entire metropolis were held.

In 1779, with one imperial Declaration, that proportion was legalized and was not changed until the last Parliament, only that 1871, after the abolition of Vojna Krajina, it was determined that in place of 25 Krajina officers, the people themselves elects another 25 of its representatives. During the first few decades of the 18th century, the members of these parliaments were appointed by the archbishops and metropolitans themselves in their dioceses, and they appointed only the most prominent people, the "boyars". According to this provision, after that time, priests, frontiersmen and citizens with peasants, each elected 25 deputies for themselves. According to specially determined constituencies and according to a precisely determined number, according to the proportion of souls in the dioceses, all 75 deputies are jointly elected, of which 25 must be clergymen, and 50 persons may be representatives of all social orders.

Sremski Karlovci became the permanent seat of the Serbian People-Church Council, where the main seat of the metropolitanate and archbishopric was, but the Councils, especially in earlier times, were held in other places as well. So is the Council of 1694 held in Baja, 1718 in Dalj, 1722 in Novi Sad, 1790 in Timisoara, 1708 and 1710 in Krušedol and two Parliaments were held in Belgrade, 1730 and 1732. In more than two hundred years, a total of 47 Serbian people's and church assemblies were held, and the last one was held in May 1910 in Sremski Karlovci. Out of the mentioned 47 parliaments, nineteen of them had the task of electing the archbishop and metropolitan of Karlovac, and those were electoral parliaments, while the other 28 parliaments were privileged and debatable, of course within the autonomy they had, and often outside that autonomy. because the Parliaments also dealt with the discussion of purely political issues.

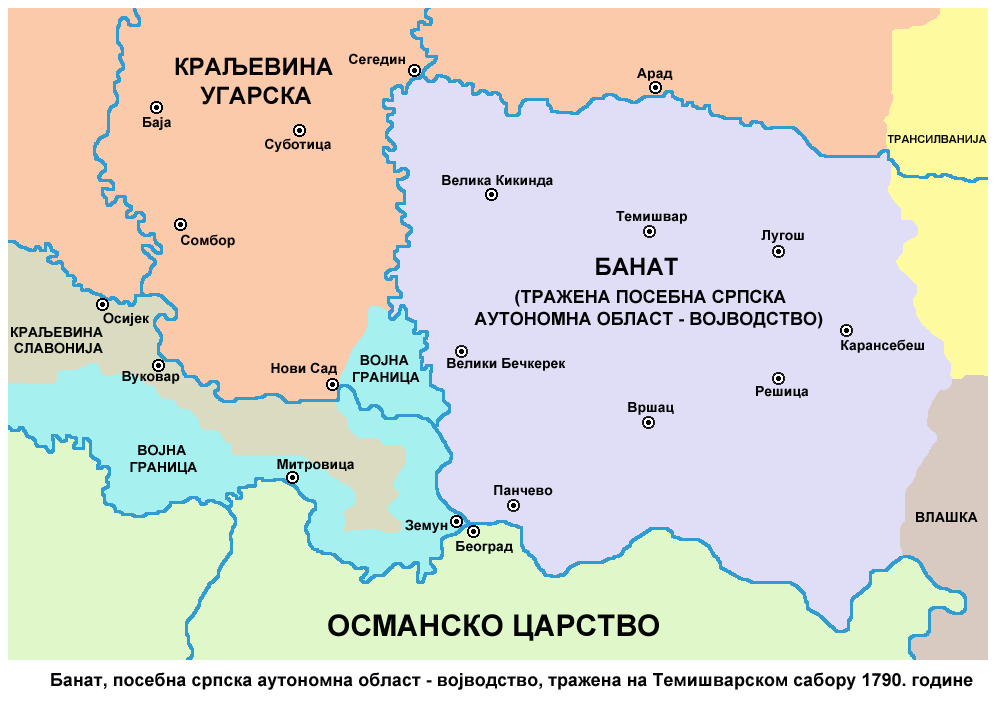

Of the privileged-debating Councils, one of the most important was the one that was in 1769 held in Sremski Karlovci. He brought several important conclusions which, somewhat later, served as the basis for the Declaration that was adopted in 1779, and that Declaration is in fact the first national-church constitution of the Habsburg Serbs. In terms of significance, the Parliament that is 1790 does not lag behind this Parliament. held in Timisoara, which had a purely political character and which served Austria as a trump card in the political struggle with the Hungarians.

It is interesting to mention that this Parliament, in addition to its 75 regular members, also had 25 Serb members, "boyars" from Hungary, so that it had a total of 100 members elected from the secular ranks. The Timisoara Parliament reached several important conclusions regarding to the needs of Serbian autonomy in the Habsburg monarchy, and also demanded that, in terms of granted privileges, a separate territory in Banat be designated for Serbs, to better protect themselves from foreign and mostly Hungarian influences. held in Baja 1694, which met at the invitation of Patriarch Arsenije III Čarnojević and the Serbian Archduke Jovan Monasterlije.

Among the more important political assemblies is, of course, the May Assembly, which is 1848 held in Sremski Karlovci. At that assembly, a conclusion was reached to start a fight with the Hungarians to defend the people's and church rights. It was, in fact, a revolutionary national assembly attended not only by Serbs from the Habsburg Monarchy, but also by Serbs from the Principality of Serbia, and it elected Colonel Stevan Supljikac as Serbian duke, and gave the title of patriarch to Karlovac archbishop and metropolitan Josip Rajacic.

After that notable assembly, another, also politically important, Assembly of Serbs from the Karlovac Metropolitanate was held. It was a council that was 1861 in Sremski Karlovci, after the abolition Duchy of Serbia and Tamiš Banat in 1860, made demands for the renewal of Serbian Vojvodina, organized on a national basis. It was an act of a purely political nature, which was not destined to enter into force because Austria, after reaching an agreement with the Hungarians, left the area of the former duchy under Hungarian rule and it did not enjoy any autonomous status under Hungarian rule.

== Political organization ==
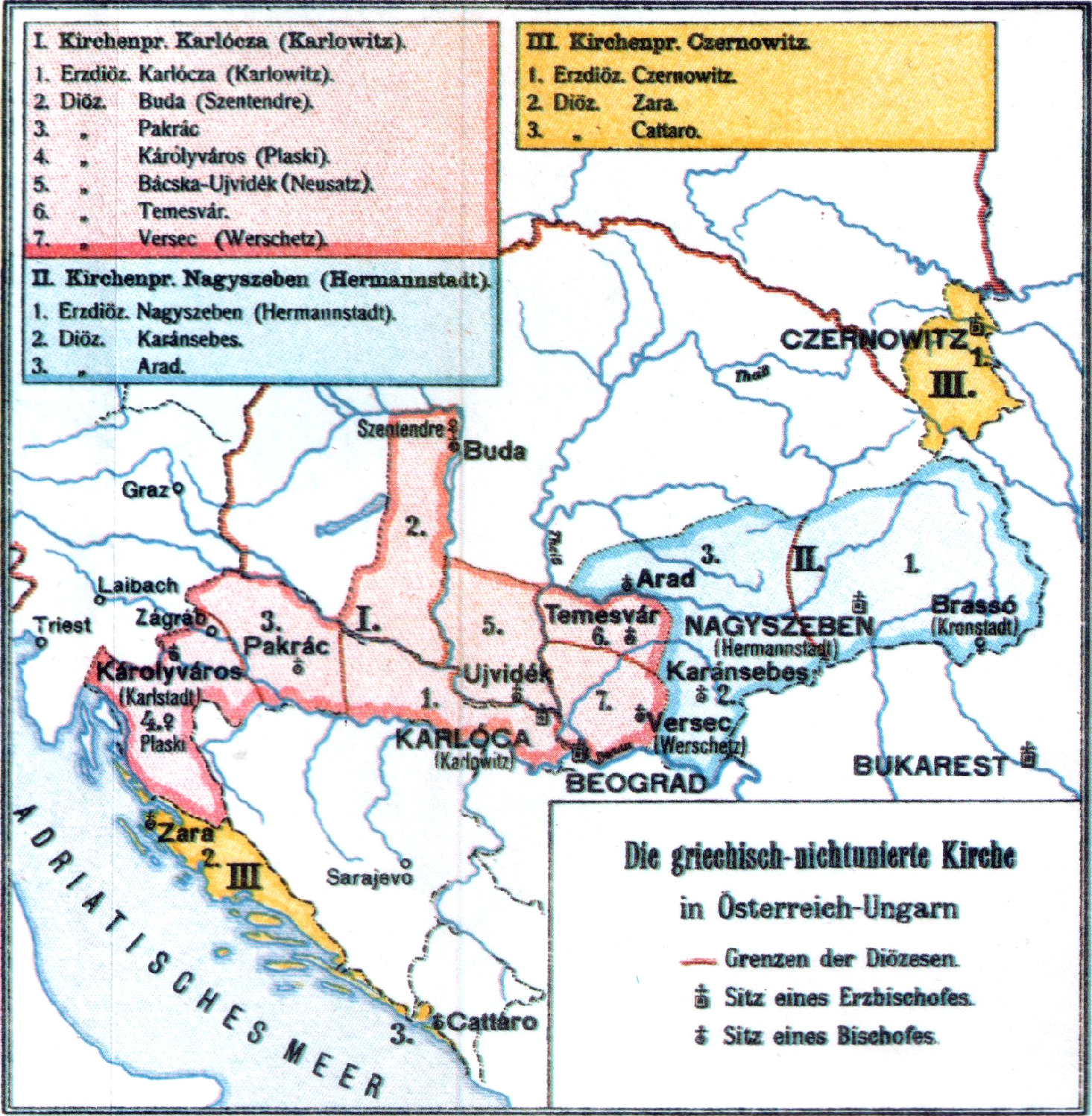

The Karlovac Metropolitanate had a large territory under its jurisdiction. These areas, in the political sense, were divided into several territories of the Habsburg monarchy. The seat of the metropolis, Sremski Karlovci, was part of the Military Border, and during the revolution of 1848–1849. as part of Serbian Vojvodina, whose proclaimed borders included the western Banat, Bačka, Baranja and most of Srem. A part of these areas was held by Austria under its rule from the end 17th century, with the exception of Banat and lower Srem, which remained under Turkish rule and after Karlovac Peace which was concluded in 1699.

These two areas also belonged to Austria after the Peace Treaty in Požarevac 1718, and 1739, after the Belgrade Peace, the river Danube and Sava became the border between the two empires, the Ottoman and the Habsburgs, which gave the Metropolitan of Karlovac its definite border with the Ottoman Empire. A large number of Serbs have lived on the large territory of that metropolis since the Middle Ages, and their number was constantly increasing with the arrival of new settlers who, Balkan, retreating in front of the Turks, inhabited those areas with permission. Austrian authorities. In that long-running historical process, the most important was Great Migrations of Serbs under the Patriarch of Pec Arsenij Čarnojević, in the last years of the 17th century. These settlers settled, almost exclusively, within the borders of the future Karlovac metropolitanate, on whose territory, thanks to the privileges granted by Emperor Leopold, Patriarch Čarnojević, had religious and to some extent political autonomy that was given not only to the Serbs who immigrated at that time, but also to the native Serbs. Hence the fact that, in a purely ecclesiastical-administrative area, within the boundaries of the Karlovac metropolitanate, he developed a political life which, it is true, was set by Karlovac metropolitans and patriarchs, but also a life in which the people themselves, based on their church autonomy, could resolve many of its internal purely political issues.

The first organization of the Orthodox Church under the Habsburg monarchy was carried out by Patriarch Arsenijr III Čarnojević. He did not intend to settle permanently in the area with the immigrant people, because he believed that Austria, with the help of Serbian refugees and Serbs in general, would succeed in suppressing the Turks and liberating the areas. Because of that, Patriarch Čarnojević, asking Emperor Leopold for privileges for Serbs and for the Orthodox Church, asked for the same rights for indigenous Serbs and all Serbs wherever they are in that empire. With the privilege given by Emperor Leopold, that right was recognized to all Serbs, in all areas where they live. Those privileges given at that time were the basis of the people's church-political and educational self-government that Serbs had in the Karlovac metropolitanate, and on the basis of them, to a narrower or wider extent, depending on the court's favor and political circumstances, the political life of the Serbian population developed.

On the basis of that privilege, only a Serb could be elected archbishop, when he elected the National-Church Council. The archbishop, on the other hand, managed the church-people's life on the basis of old customs, and since the patriarch under the Turks also had some secular rights over the Serbs, those rights were given to him by that imperial privilege. In that way, the people came to their village and city self-government in the area of this metropolis, so that Serbs in villages and towns could live in their old people's organizations, according to their old folk customs, and under the rule of their people's authorities, princes and other elders. which they choose themselves.

These privileges provided the basis for the organization of national-church life, to which the tone and regulations were given by the Serbian National-Church Councils, an institution that arose from the framework of given privileges, chosen by the church and secular classes. The parliaments were therefore a religious-political autonomous institution, which lasted over 200 years and was the center of the best part of all cultural and political work in the vast areas of the Karlovac metropolitanate.

It is understood that the Serbian People's-Church Councils served the metropolitans and archbishops as a strong support in the defense of people's rights and privileges, which were very often in danger from either the Viennese or the Budapest rulers. From these assemblies, lawsuits and numerous deputations were often sent to the emperors, who managed to resolve many important national-political and religious issues favorably. On the contrary, the state authorities very often obstructed the work and functions of the Parliament, and even managed to stir up a struggle between the higher clergy and the bourgeoisie among the Serbs, so that a persistent struggle for supremacy was waged among them. Since that time, many Serbian People's Church Councils have been more to the detriment than to the benefit of both the people and the Church, and this struggle has made the later Councils of Serbs in the Habsburg monarchy lose much of their former significance and importance.

The assemblies, if held in the seat of the metropolitanate in Sremski Karlovci, were held in the cathedral church of St. Nikola, and later in various other rooms, mostly in the hall of the Karlovac city municipality. Only at the end 19th century and the People's House was built in Karlovac, with a special parliamentary hall, in which the last few parliaments were held.

The elections for the Serbian National-Church Assembly in Sremski Karlovci, especially those from the last period, had a great political significance and gave the existing Serbian parties the possibility of affirmation. This is the case, for example, at the last Parliament, which was held 1910 in Sremski Karlovci, the majority was Serbian Independent Party, while People's Radical Party was in the minority.

The last Serbian National-Church Assembly of the Karlovac Metropolitanate was opened 29 may 1910. The opening by reading the emperor's rescript was made by the commissioner of the Hungarian government Julia Rohonji, the Hungarian secretary of state who read the rescript in Hungarian. The main task of that Parliament was to renew the central people's-church autonomous authorities, to elect a new Parliamentary Board, the Metropolitan Church Council and the People's School Council, to elect the main school clerk and to amend some autonomous provisions. The Parliament held 47 sessions in all, but its conclusions remained unfulfilled because the Hungarian government found it necessary to suspend the main provisions of the autonomous decree, motivating this step by "the fact that the Serbian National-Church Parliaments, after 9 legal articles from 1868, passed some decrees are detrimental to the highest royal supervision and violate majestic rights. "

=== Organization of Serbian People's Church Council ===
The Serbian People's Church Council also had their own bodies, the scope of which can be determined as follows:

- 1. The Parliamentary Board, which was a higher instance for church-administrative affairs. In addition, he had the right to prepare proposals for parliamentary debates, to make public and execute parliamentary conclusions, etc. The Parliamentary Committee was elected by the Parliament itself, and its president was the Metropolitan himself, and later the Patriarch. The members of the board were another bishop, two priests and five lay people, members of parliament.
- 2. The Metropolitan Church Council consisted of a metropolitan with 2 bishops, three priests and three lay people, and met several times a year. That council performed mainly those functions that are performed today by the Great Spiritual Court.
- 3. The People's School Council was the supreme supervisory authority of all Serbian religious schools and other educational institutions. The council consisted of the main school clerk and six people elected by the Parliament, and its functions were to take care of primary, secondary and higher education and training of Serbs in the metropolis.

In addition to a purely religious and educational character within the framework of religious autonomy, the Serbian people's and church assemblies also had a political character that was of great importance for Serbs in the Karlovac metropolitanate, and especially for that part of them whose representatives did not go to far more tolerant Croatian but Hungarian cathedral. Within that autonomy, the Serbs in Srem and the rest of Vojvodina strengthened themselves morally and materially; with this work, they prepared a whole cadre of intellectuals who played one of the most important cultural and political roles in the renewed Serbia, from Karadjordj's time until the founding of the Great School in Belgrade and later; in the same framework, they managed to develop a great cultural, literary, artistic and scientific activity, the whole significance of which can only be properly assessed today. After all, if it were not for the autonomy that gained more importance through the Parliament than it really had, there would be no Serbian Athens, nor the influence that the old Serbian spiritual center exerted in the most critical times of Serbian national history.

== Literature ==
- Адамовић, Јова (1902). Привилегије српског народа у Угарској и рад Благовештенског сабора 1861. Загреб: Српска штампарија.
- Васин, Горан (2013). "О српским црквено-народним саборима у Хабзбуршкој монархији 1861–1890" (PDF). Годишњак Историјског архива града Новог Сада. 7: 32–45. Archived from the original (PDF) on 20 October 2016.
- Веселиновић, Рајко Л. (1986). "Народноцрквена и привилегијска питања Срба у Хабсбуршкој Монархији 1699—1716. године". Историја српског народа. Vol. књ. 4, св. 1. Београд: Српска књижевна задруга. pp. 39–54.
- Гавриловић, Владан (2005). Темишварски сабор и Илирска дворска канцеларија (1790–1792). Нови Сад: Платонеум. ISBN 9788683639267.
- Гавриловић, Владан (2013). "Темишварски сабор 1790. године: Срби у Монархији између угарских и аустријских валсти" (PDF). Годишњак Историјског архива града Новог Сада. 7: 11–31. Archived from the original (PDF) on 20 October 2016.
- Гавриловић, Славко (1986). "Срби у Угарској и Славонији од аустро-турског рата 1737–1739. до краја XVIII века". Историја српског народа. Vol. књ. 4, св. 1. Београд: Српска књижевна задруга. pp. 195–216.
- Гавриловић, Славко (2010). О Србима Хабзбуршке монархије. Београд: Српска књижевна задруга. ISBN 9788637911241.
- Gavrilović, Slavko; Petrović, Nikola (1972). Temišvarski sabor 1790. Sremski Karlovci: Arhiv Vojvodine.
- Микавица, Дејан (2005). Српска Војводина у Хабзбуршкој монархији 1690–1920: Историја идеје о држави и аутономији пречанских Срба. Нови Сад: Stylos.
- Микавица, Дејан (2011). Српско питање на Угарском сабору 1690–1918. Нови Сад: Филозофски факултет.
- Микавица, Дејан (2017). Српска политика у Војводини 1526–1918. Нови Сад: Завод за културу Војводине.
- Микавица, Дејан (2018). Српска политичка елита у Аустроугарској монархији: 1526–1860. Vol. 1. Нови Сад: Завод за културу Војводине.
- Микавица, Дејан; Гавриловић, Владан; Васин, Горан (2007). Знаменита документа за историју српског народа 1538–1918. Нови Сад: Филозофски факултет. ISBN 9788680271750.
- Микавица, Дејан; Лемајић, Ненад; Васин, Горан; Нинковић, Ненад (2016). Срби у Хабзбуршкој монархији 1526-1918. Vol. 1. Нови Сад: Прометеј.
- Павловић, Стеван (1870). Србски народни сабор у Сремским Карловцима године 1869. Нови Сад: Српска књижевна задруга.
- Слијепчевић, Ђоко М. (1966). Историја Српске православне цркве. Vol. књ. 2. Минхен: Искра.
- Точанац, Исидора (2008). Српски народно-црквени сабори (1718–1735). Београд: Историјски институт САНУ. ISBN 9788677430689.
- Точанац-Радовић, Исидора (2014). "Настанак и развој институције Српског народно-црквеног сабора у Карловачкој митрополији у 18. веку". Три века Карловачке митрополије 1713-2013 (PDF). Сремски Карловци-Нови Сад: Епархија сремска, Филозофски факултет. pp. 127–144. Archived from the original (PDF) on 9 April 2021.
- Точанац-Радовић, Исидора (2015). "Захтеви и жалбе Горњокарловачке епархије на народно-црквеном сабору 1781. године". Зборник о Србима у Хрватској. 9: 99–133.
