= Maksim Evgenijević =

Maksim Evgenijević (Serbian Cyrillic: Максим Евгенијевић; Užice, 1795 — Veliki Beckerek, 1877) was a merchant and one of the leaders of the Serbian people's movement in Veliki Bečkerek during the Revolution of 1848-1849.

== Biography ==
Maksim Evgenijević (but also Evgenović) was born in 1795 in Užice. He began to learn the trade in 1807 with a Zemun Jewish tailor. As one of the participants in the First Serbian Uprising, after its collapse, he retired in 1813 across the Danube to Pančevo, where he lived until 1822. He then moved to Perlez, where he successfully traded in pigs, from which he gained considerable capital. Before his marriage, he was engaged in trade in Orlovat for some time. He appeared in 1826 as a merchant in Perlez, and a subscriber to the Serbian Chronicle. He was the imperial and royal solar in Perlez for several years (1829-1830), and he became rich from that state privilege. By engaging in trade, he became one of the wealthiest Serbs in southern Banat. He owned hundreds of acres of land in Perlez and Bečkerek, and since 1847 he has lived in Bečkerek. Like other rich Serbs from that city, he sacrificed his wealth during the Hungarian uprising of 1848-1849. years. His stepson Stefan, to whom he left the shop, later seems to have ruined Maksim's property.

He was married to Alka, who after his death in early 1878 donated a silver lamp to the Serbian Orthodox Church in Perlez. A portrait of the couple Maksim and Alka by academic painter Živko Petrović in 1844 is on exhibit in the National Museum in Belgrade.

As a prominent and respected man and a close friend of Stevan Knićanin, he joined the Serbian People's Movement in 1848. Until then, he maintained personal and business ties with Serbs from the Principality of Serbia. He was one of the four delegates (from Veliki Bečkerek) within the delegation led by Patriarch Rajačić, which was supposed to go to Innsbruck on 26 March 1848, for agreements with the Austrian Emperor Ferdinand. As he had property and cattle on the pasture and in Perlez, he dealt with and was a mediator between the authorities of the Banat region and its constituent people, the Serbs. As a participant in the First Serbian Uprising, he had warrior experience and tried to help organize it. In the summer of 1848, for the Perlis military camp under the command of Drakulić, he donated 60 of his oxen brought from Bečkerek, to feed Serbian volunteers. He was the People's Commissar - the supplier of that Serbian military camp, and he interfered in the leadership and was in conflict with the People's Colonel Drakulić. He even physically attacked Patriarch Rajačić in Pančevo for not removing that incompetent commander, and thus prevented the pearl catastrophe. His property in Veliki Bečkerek was confiscated by the local authorities because of his "high treason", and secretly sold for 19,000 pounds to some Jews and Swabians. In the Serbian People's Committee, which was formed in Veliki Bečkerek, immediately after the entry of the Serbian army, he became a member of its "Financial Department".

Maxim was a great lover of literature, a subscription collector and a buyer of a large number of books and magazines. He appeared in 1826 as a subscriber to the "Serbian Chronicle", in Veliki Bečkerek, as a merchant from Perlez. He also made contributions as a Perlez merchant before 1847, to Matica srpska. Maksim subscribed to the youth magazine "Mlada Srbadija" in Veliki Bečkerek in 1870. He had a large and valuable library of books that, unfortunately, burned down in a fire in 1905. He also compiled his autobiography, which was published in Pest.

He maintained ties with his homeland, and founded the Enlightenment Fund in his native Užice.

Maksim Evgenijević died in 1877, impoverished, in Veliki Bečkerek.
