= Vasa Živković =

Serbian poet and Orthodox priest

Vasilije "Vasa" Živković
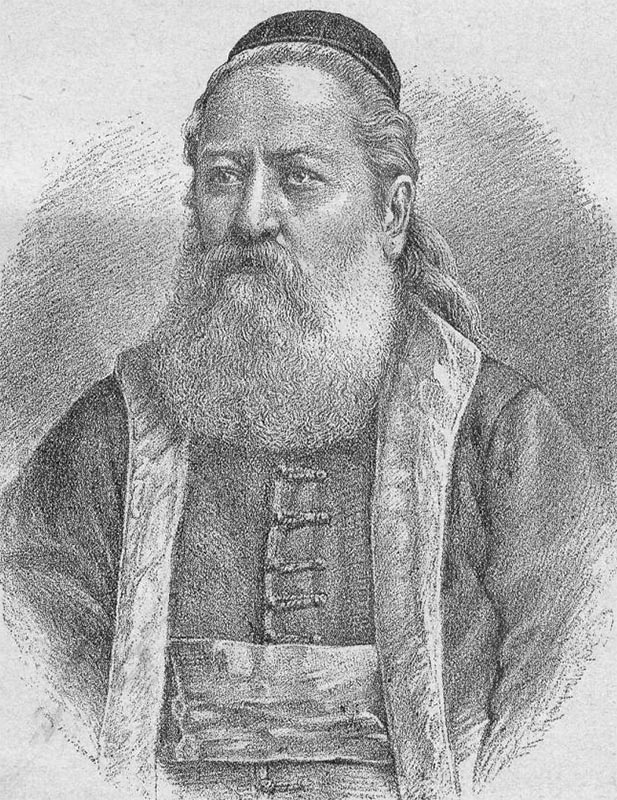
- Print of Živković c. 1887
- Born: Vasilije Živković; 31 January 1819; Pančevo, Austrian Empire
- Died: 25 June 1891 (aged 72); Pančevo, Austria-Hungary
- Occupation: Orthodox Priest

Vasilije "Vasa" Živković (1819–1891) was a Serbian poet and Orthodox priest. He is highly regarded in Serbian culture for his role in collecting verses from oral traditions of his people. His literary opus sustained only half of his poems to be printed since he was prone to self-criticism. His contemporaries were poets Jovan Ilić, father of Vojislav Ilić, Stevan Vladislav Kačanski, and many others.

== Biography ==
Vasilije Živković was born in the town of Pančevo in Banat on 31 January 1819, where his father, a soldier of the Serbian Military Frontier, was then a resident. He attended Elementary school at Pančevo, and later enrolled in public gymnasia of Szeged and Sremski Karlovci. At the age of nineteen (1838), he studied law at Pest and Pozun (Bratislava). In 1841 he came to Vrsac to study theology at the Serbian Orthodox Seminary, where he along with a few others founded an organization called Srpska Sloga Banatska (Serbian unity of Banat). Ordained in 1846 by the bishop of Pančevo, where he accepted the curacy of the town, which he retained for the rest of his life. He participated in the 1848 Revolution siding with the Austrian emperor against the Hungarian insurgents. Živković represented the constituents of Pančevo and the area at the Karlovci Sabor during an important period and, from 1864 on, was performing diplomatic duties at the time when the affairs of the Serbs in Banat attracted unusual amounts of attention throughout Europe. In 1868 he was elevated to archpriest.

In an award-winning autobiography From Immigrant to Inventor (published by Charles Scribner's Sons, New York and London, 1924), Serbian-American physicist Mihajlo Pupin remembered hearing one of many Petar II Petrović Njegoš's lyrical verses recited by Vasilije Živković, "The verse from Njegoš I obtained from a Serbian poet, who was an archpriest, a protoyeray, and who was my religious teacher in Pančevo. His name, Vasa Živković, I shall never forget, because it is sweet music to my ear on account of the memories of affectionate friendship he cherished for me." On numerous occasions, Živković rescued a young Pupin from being either expelled from school or sent back to his village. When Pupin got himself into trouble with the Austrian authorities after being caught in a scrimmage with the Austrian flag under his feet, he was faced with expulsion from school, but Živković once again came to his rescue. It was Živković and his congregation that promised assistance should the financial burden attached to Pupin's studies in electro-mechanics in Prague in 1872 become too heavy a burden for his parents.

Živković died at Pančevo on 25 June 1891. His closing years were marked by intrigue and sadness. Živković's suffered from mental duress, arising mainly from the political opposition his sympathy with Serb revolutionary ideas of the time brought on him.

== Works ==
Živković began to contribute to the Pančevo reviews as early as 1838, and his verses found their way into most of the Serbian literary periodicals favorable to the Romantic poets and writers. Having begun, however, to write under the influence of Lukijan Musicki and the contemporary leadership of German and world literature at the same time, he retained the classical tradition, though he adopted innovations of Goethe and Schiller. His style shows the influence of Schiller, of whom he was a diligent disciple, according to literary critic Jovan Skerlić. His first volume of poems appeared in 1856–1858, and among numerous later volumes are his Collected Poems, published posthumously in Belgrade in 1907, in several tomes.

Živković was a very patriotic poet, and wrote lyrics that are still popular with Serbs today, who continue to sing them, not necessarily remembering the author. Some of his songs, such as Rado ide Srbin u vojnike and Or'o klikće sa visine, became hymns in his own lifetime. Even though many of his poems have entered into the annals of Serbian national patriotic opus, he is not very well known, both inside and outside of Serbia.
