= Aleksandar Stojačković =

Serbian historian and politician (1822–1893)

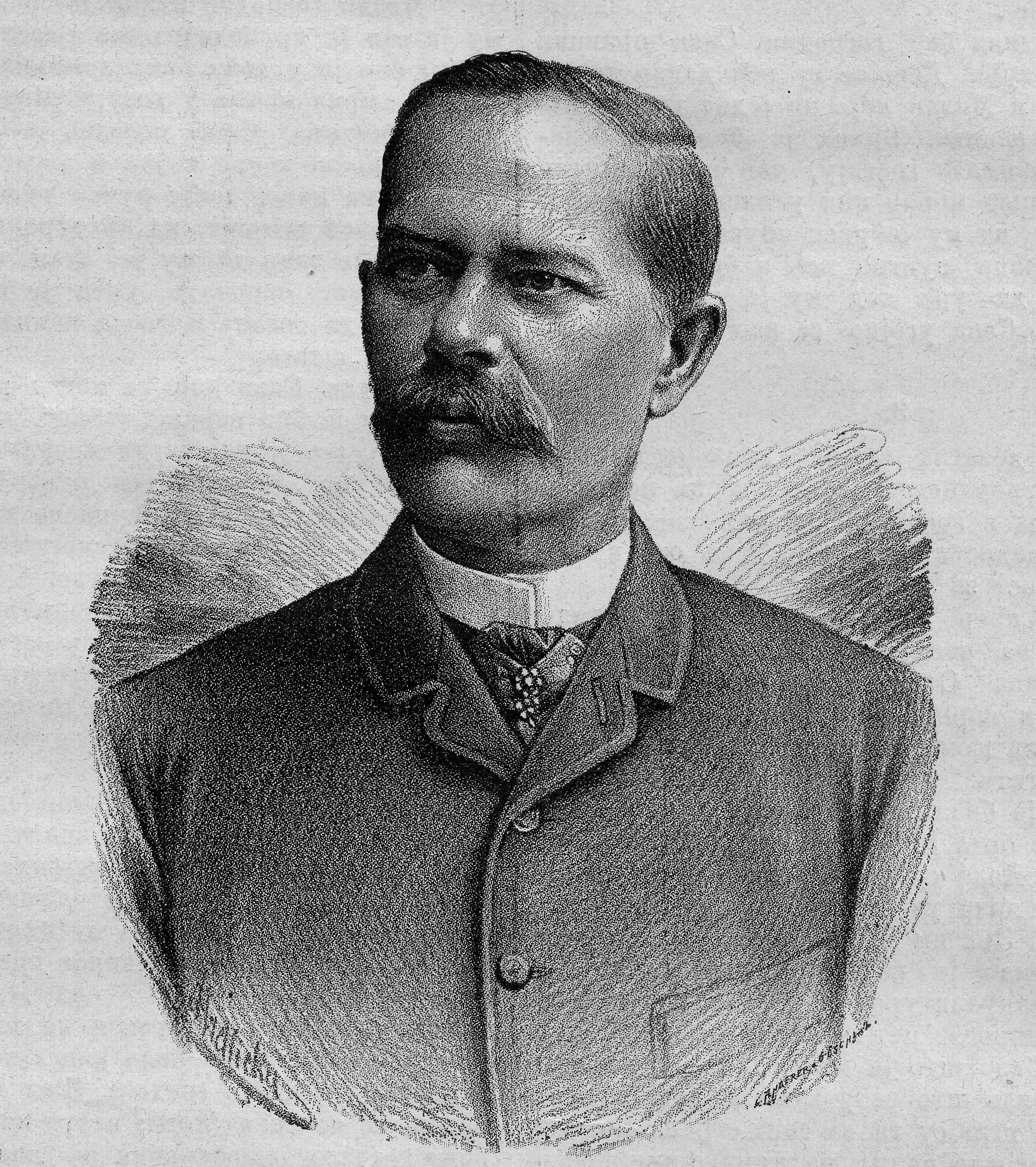
Aleksandar Stojačković, c. 1893

Aleksandar Stojačković (Serbian Cyrillic: Александар Стојачковић; 25 May 1822 - 21 June 1893) was a 19th century Serbian historian, publicist and politician.

== Family, youth ==
He hails from an old, respectable Serbian family in Sombor from the time of the Military Frontier. His grandfather was Mihailo Stojačković. Father Luka Stojačković (1785-1864) was a prominent figure of the 19th century Sombor and Bačka. Luka distinguished himself from 1848 to 1849 when he was elected president of the District Bačka Board of the Serbian movement. A lawyer by profession, he was for a long time a member of the municipal board, a city senator and the manager of Serbian public schools in Sombor (since 1850). He had from his marriage (concluded in 1818) with Sofia née Djekić from Osijek, two sons - Aleksandar and Nikola, and two daughters. His farm near Sombor was burned down by the Hungarian revolutionaries in February 1849. The character and work of his father Luka, the "Great Serb", were described and published in 1882 by his son Aleksandar.

Stojačković attended high school in Sremski Karlovci and Kecskemét. He also finished the seminary in Karlovac. He studied philosophy in Pecs and law in Pest.

== Career ==
In 1847, he was elected professor of general history at the Karlovac High School. He represented Karlovac as a member of the May Assembly in 1848. During the Serbian People's Movement 1848-1849. he was the secretary of Duke Stevan Šupljikac. After the end of the revolution, he was a translator for the Serbian language in Timisoara, the administrative center of the Duchy of Serbia and the Tamis Banat. Then he was the mayor of Vršac for a short period. From 1860 he was the first headmaster, and then the secretary of the Hungarian vicarage in Budapest. From 1867 he worked in the Hungarian Ministry of the Interior, first as a secretary and then as a departmental adviser. He retired in 1883 and continued to live in Buda.

== Academic ==
Professor Stojačković was appreciated in Serbia for his historiographical works. On 1 August 1848, he became a very young, corresponding (correspondent) member of the Society of Serbian Literature in Belgrade. He became a corresponding member, now of the Serbian Academic Society, on 29 July 1864. He became an honorary member of the Serbian Royal Academy on 15 November 1892.

== Political engagement ==
At the Annunciation Assembly in 1861, he was a deputy of the city of Sombor and a parliamentary leader. He also took an active part in the Church-People's Assembly held in 1892. Previously, he chaired the Committee of Fifteen, which in 1891 discussed issues important for the Serbian church autonomy. On several occasions, he was a member of the Hungarian Parliament - as a representative of Sombor (1866-1869), Vršac (1884-1887) and the Bela Crkva constituency (1887-1892).

In the old days, he was the president of the Serbian Orthodox community in Buda for many years.

== Scientific and journalistic work ==
He published his first paper in 1843 in the Serbian People's Gazette of Teodor Pavlović. He published a total of fifteen historical treatises in the aforementioned newspaper, as well as in the Letopi (Chronicle) of Matica srpska. Before the Hungarian revolution in 1847, he published the first book, about the Orthodox rite and promoting the Cyrillic alphabet, which he became famous for in Serbia proper.

Stojačković was a colleague of Jovan Sterija Popović, and taught Laza Kostić, and Ilarion Ruvarac.

For a year (1888-1889) he edited the Serbian daily (Српски дневник), "a paper for politics, education, economy, labour and trade".

== Bibliography ==
- Историја восточно-славенског богослуженија и кирилског књижества код Славена западне цркве (Нови Сад, 1847) / History of East Slavic worship and Cyrillic literature among the Slavs of the Western Church (Novi Sad, 1847)
- Черте живота народа србског у унгарским областима (Беч, 1849) / Features of the life of the Serbian people in the Hungarian areas (Vienna, 1849)
- Ueber die staatsrechtlichen Verhältnisse der Serbien in der Wojwodina und überhaupt in den Ländern der ungarischen Krone: Historisch-juridische Abhandlung (Темишвар, 1860) / About the state-owned relations of Serbia in Vojvodina and overhauled in the lands of the Hungarian Crown: Historical-legal abolition (Timisoara, 1860)
- A magyarországi gör. kel. szerb egyház önkormányzatáról (Будимпешта, 1886) / The Hungarian mountains. kel. szerb egyház önkormányzatáról (Budapest, 1886)
