= Stevan Knićanin =

Serbian military commander (1807–1855)

Vojvoda Stevan Petrović Knićanin Стеван Петровић Книћанин
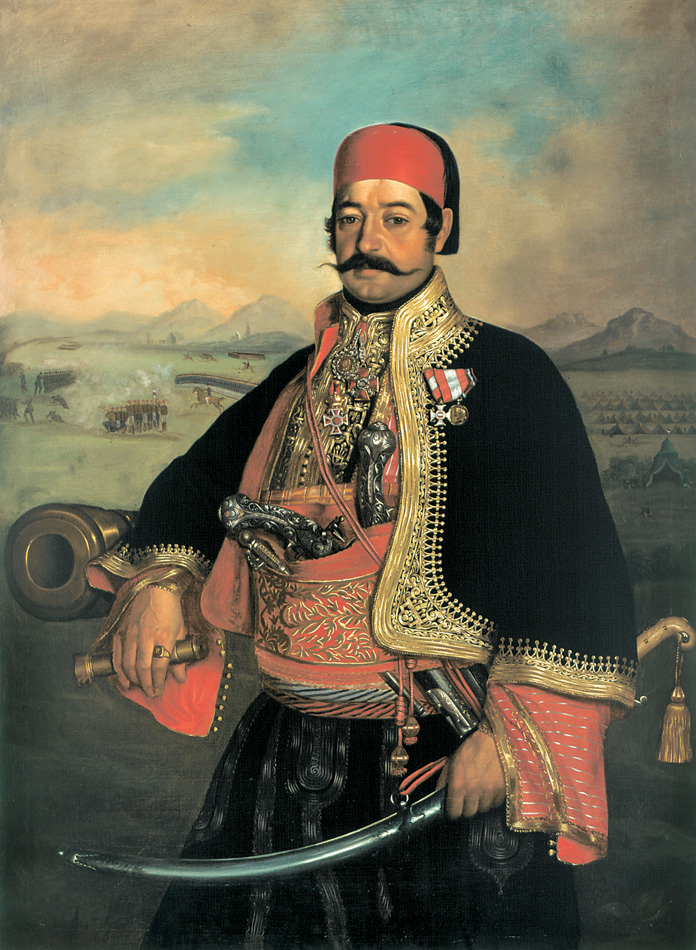
- Stevan Knićanin, oil painting by Uroš Knežević, 1849

Minister of Internal Affairs
- In office 26 December 1854 – 1 January 1855
- Preceded by: Aleksandar Nenadović
- Succeeded by: Stevan Magazinović

Personal details
- Born: 15 February 1807 Knić, Sanjak of Smederevo
- Died: 14 May 1855 (48 years) Belgrade, Principality of Serbia
- Occupation: military commander commissioner
- Awards: Order of Glory; Military Order of Maria Theresa; Order of St. Vladimir; Order of Leopold; Obilić Medal

Military service
- Allegiance: Principality of Serbia; Serbian Vojvodina
- Rank: Major General

Stevan Petrović, KCMT (Serbian Cyrillic: Стеван Петровић), known as Stevan Knićanin (Стеван Книћанин, Stevan of Knić; 15 February 1807 – 14 May 1855) was a Serbian voivode and military commander of the Serbian volunteers in Serbian Vojvodina during the 1848 revolution.

== Early life ==
Stevan Petrović was born on 15 February 1807 in Knić near Kragujevac (hence his nickname), during the Serbian Revolution, the region at the time being part of the Sanjak of Smederevo of the Ottoman Empire (today Serbia). During the rule of Prince Miloš Obrenović, Knićanin's political career began as a commissioner of the Jasenica District (Jasenički srez) in 1835, and in 1839 as a commissioner of the Smederevo District, but he eventually joined the opposition as a Constitutionalist and supporter of the rival Prince Aleksandar Karađorđević of the Karađorđević dynasty. Due to this, he was expelled by Obrenović from the Principality of Serbia in 1840–1841. He returned in 1842, as Aleksandar Karađorđević had acceded to the throne on 14 September, after being elected the Prince of Serbia at the National Assembly in Vračar.

== 1848 revolution ==
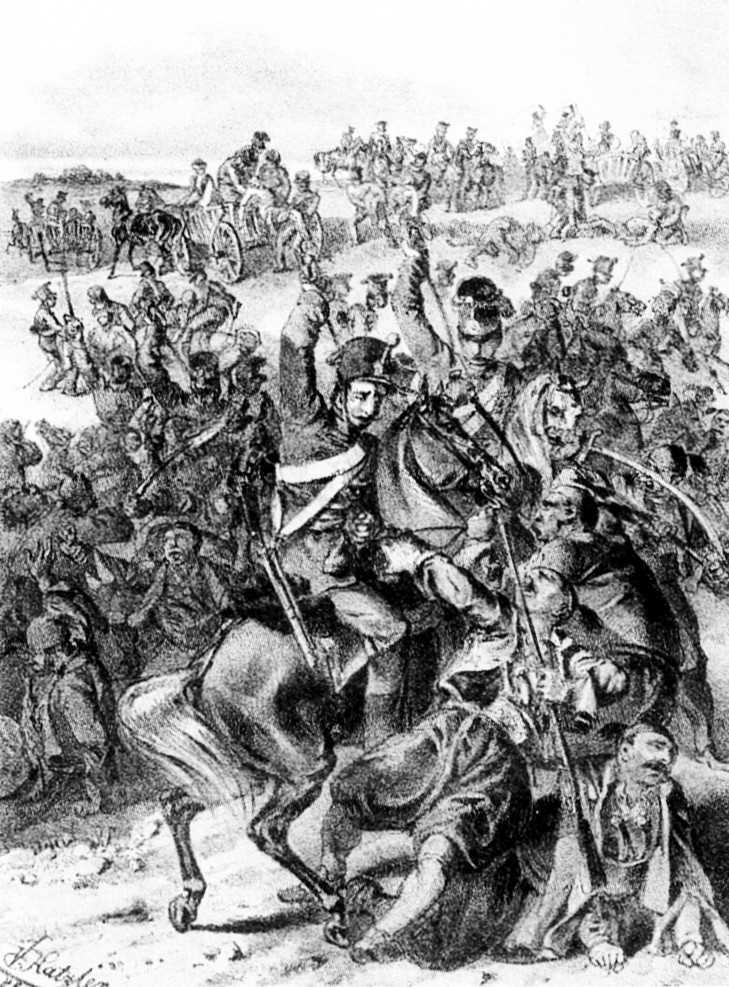
Battle of Vilovo, 1849.

During the 1848 Revolution, the Hungarians demanded national rights and autonomy within the Austrian Empire. However, they did not recognize the national rights of other nationalities which lived in the Habsburg Kingdom of Hungary in that time. As part of the Revolutions of 1848, the Serbs under Austria-Hungary demanded what they had in the previous century; recognition of Serbian as official language, equality of the Orthodox church as with Catholics, and annual church assembly gatherings. They met at Sremski Karlovci and Novi Sad. Several thousand Serbs met at the May Assembly in Sremski Karlovci on 1 May 1848. The delegates chose prominent Austrian-Serb general Stevan Šupljikac as voivode, the civil and military commander (duke). Josif Rajačić was elected the patriarch of the Serbs. The Serbs demanded a national unit consisting of Banat, Bačka, Baranja and part of Srem, known collectively as Vojvodina.

From May 1848 onward, Serbs of Vojvodina directly sought aid from the Serbian Principality, and on 10 May, general Stratimirović, head of the main committee, appealed to Prince Aleksandar for assistance and urged Knićanin to intercede. Knićanin was elected military commander. He had no prior experience in war, nor went to military school. In June and July a large wave of volunteers from Serbia entered Vojvodina. Knićanin arrived on 25 July. Among others who arrived were: the brother and nephew of Hajduk Veljko, council member Milutin Petrović, major Stanojlo Petrović, captain Sava Petrović and vojvoda and archpriest Matija Nenadović. From August 1848, Knićanin was a commander of the Serbian volunteer squads in the Serbian Vojvodina, in which unit also Golub Babić fought in. The size of his army exceeded 8,000 or 10,000 men. His military knowledge was expressed in more occasions, especially in the battles near Pančevo and Vršac during the 1848 Revolution in what was then the Austrian Empire.

== Later years ==
After his return to Serbia in 1849, Knićanin was awarded with the honorary title of vojvoda by Aleksandar Karađorđević, at that time it had only been given to Toma Vučić Perišić. He was a "Knight of Maria Therese", the highest order of the Austrian army. In 1849, he also became an honorary member of the Society of Serbian Letters, the first learned society in the Principality of Serbia, which preceded the Serbian Academy of Sciences and Arts.

As a result of a stroke in 1854, he died on 14 May 1855, in Belgrade.

== Legacy ==
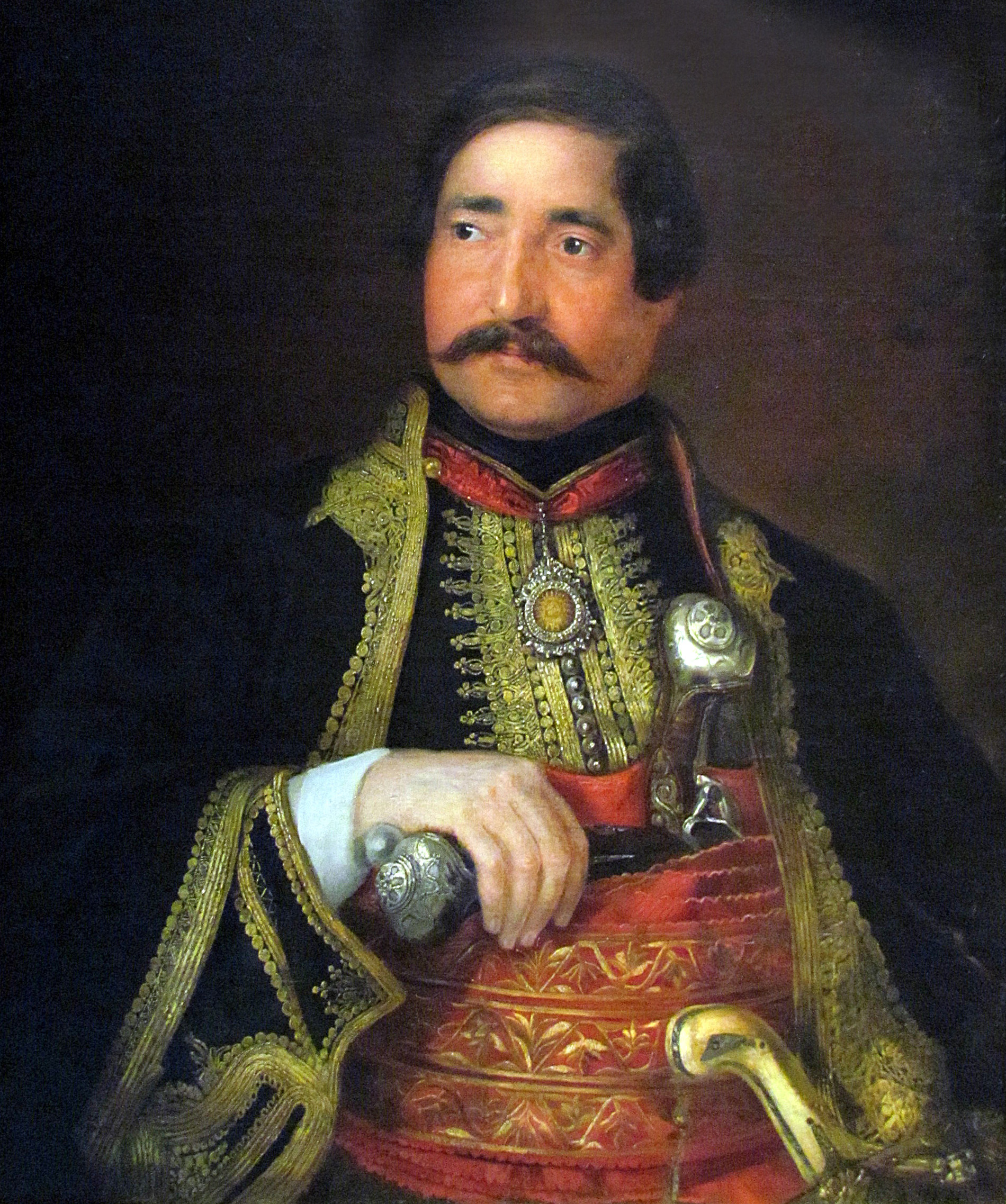
A portrait of Knićanin by Katarina Ivanović

In 1850, Louis Kossuth wrote: "Bold Knićanin did wonders of bravery on the Lower Danube".

The village of Knićanin in the Serbian province of Vojvodina was named after him.

A monument in Knić was erected in his honor.

== Literature ==
- Jovan Mirosavljević, Brevijar ulica Novog Sada 1745–2001, Novi Sad, 2002.
- Barbara Jelavich, History of the Balkans: Eighteenth and nineteenth centuries
- Vojna enciklopedija, Beograd, 1970., knjiga prva, strana 423.
- Gilman, D. C.; Peck, H. T.; Colby, F. M., eds. (1905). "Knitchanin, Stephan Petroknitch" . New International Encyclopedia (1st ed.). New York: Dodd, Mead.
- Radoš Ljušić, 2008, Ilija Garašanin on Serbia's Statehood

Military offices
New title	Commander of Serbian Vojvodina troops (In Habsburgs) subordinate Stevan Šupljikac (-Dec 15) fl. August 1848 – May 1849	Unknown
