= Annunciation Council =

Council of elected Serb representatives

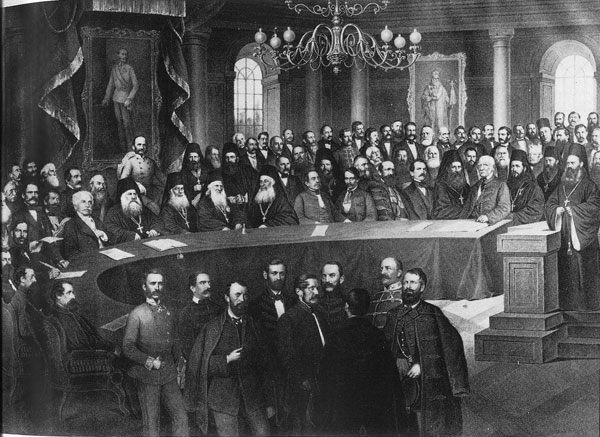
The Annunciation Council in Sremski Karlovci (1861)

The Annunciation Council (Serbian Cyrillic: Благовештенски сабор, Serbian Latin: Blagoveštenski sabor) was a council of elected representatives of Eastern Orthodox Serbs in the Austrian Empire, which was held on 2 April 1861, in Sremski Karlovci, on the day of the church holiday of Annunciation.

After the abolition of the Voivodeship of Serbia and Temes Banat (1860), political and ecclesiastical representatives of the Serbian people living in the Austrian Empire, led by patriarch Josif Rajačić, met in a council, or assembly and adopted a sixteen-point program, demanding territorial and political autonomy. They accepted the emperor's condition that all Serbian demands should be made and within political frameworks of the Kingdom of Hungary. Serbian demands were supported by imperial minister Anton von Schmerling, but remained unfulfilled.

== See also ==
- Serbian Vojvodina
- History of Vojvodina
- Patriarchate of Karlovci
- History of Serbia

== Sources ==
- Bataković, Dušan T., ed. (2005). Histoire du peuple serbe [History of the Serbian People] (in French). Lausanne: L’Age d’Homme. ISBN 978-2-8251-1958-7.
- Bataković, Dušan T. (2014). The Foreign Policy of Serbia (1844-1867): IIija Garašanin's Načertanije. Belgrade: Institute for Balkan Studies. ISBN 978-86-7179-089-5.
- Ćirković, Sima (2004). The Serbs. Malden: Blackwell Publishing. ISBN 978-1-4051-4291-5.
- Dedijer, Vladimir; Božić, Ivan; Ćirković, Sima; Ekmečić, Milorad (1974). History of Yugoslavia. New York: McGraw-Hill Book Company. ISBN 978-0-07-016235-8.
- Gavrilović, Vladan (2023). "The Serbian Vojvodina: Idea and borders until 1918". Istraživanja: Journal of historical researches. 34: 112–120.
- Krestić, Vasilije (1997). History of the Serbs in Croatia and Slavonia 1848–1914. Belgrade: BIGZ. ISBN 978-86-13-00888-0.
- Markus, Tomislav (2010). "The Serbian question in Croatian politics, 1848-1918". Review of Croatian History. 6: 165–188.
