= Ivan Božić =

Ivan Božić may refer to:

- Ivan Božić (footballer, born 1983) (born 1983), Bosnian-Herzegovinian footballer
- Ivan Božić (footballer, born 1997) (born 1997), Croatian footballer
- Ivan Božić (historian) (1915–1977), Yugoslavian historian and academic
