= Serbian Vojvodina =

1848-49 autonomous region in Austrian Empire

Serbian Vojvodina Српска Војводина (Serbian)
- Self-proclaimed autonomous region of the Austrian Empire
- 1848–1849
- Flag Coat of arms

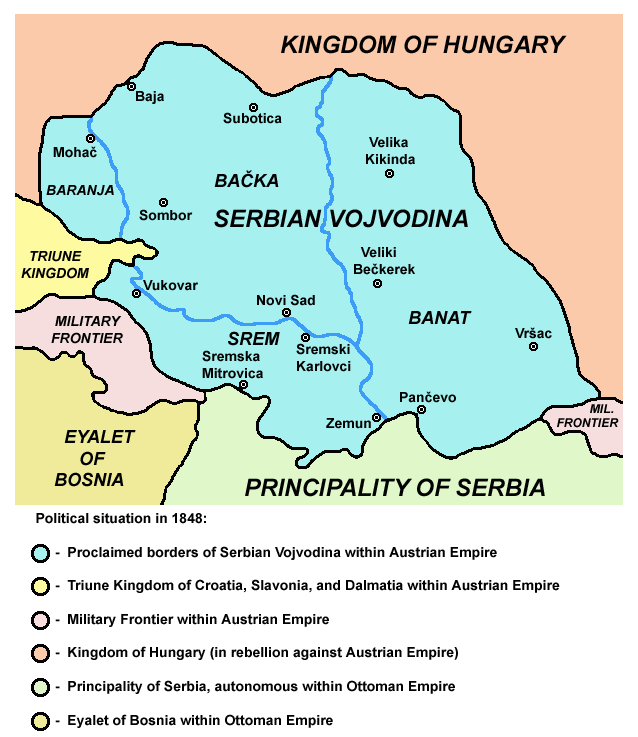
- Capital: Sremski Karlovci; Zemun; Veliki Bečkerek
- Government
- President
  - 13 May–June 1848: Josif Rajačić
  - June–19 September 1848: Đorđe Stratimirović
  - 19 September 1848–18 November 1849: Josif Rajačić
- History
  - May Assembly: 13 May 1848
  - Formation of Voivodeship of Serbia and Banat of Temeschwar: 18 November 1849
Preceded by	Succeeded by
Austrian Empire	Voivodeship of Serbia and Banat of Temeschwar
- Today part of: Serbia; Partial in: Croatia; Hungary; Romania

Serbian Vojvodina was a short-lived self-proclaimed autonomous province within the Austrian Empire in Kingdom of Hungary during the Hungarian Revolution and War of Independence of 1848–1849, which existed until 1849 when it was transformed into the new (official) Austrian province named Voivodeship of Serbia and Temes Banat. It was created and led by political leaders of Serbs in regions of Syrmia, Banat, Bačka and Baranja. The Serbian Vojvodina gave its name to the present Vojvodina autonomous region in Serbia.

The first capital was Sremski Karlovci. It was later moved to Zemun, Veliki Bečkerek (now Zrenjanin).

== Name ==
In contemporary Serbian, it was known as the "Serb Voivodeship", the official summary document using mostly Vojvodovina Srbska (archaic Войводовина Србска, modern Војводовина Србска) and in one instance Srbska Vojvodina (archaic Србска Войводовина, modern Србска Војводовина). In Serbian historiography, it is known as Srpska Vojvodina (Српска Војводина), rendered "Serbian Vojvodina" in English, and Srpska Vojvodovina (Српска Војводовина). In contemporary German, it was known as Serbische Woiwodina, or Wojwodina. In Hungarian, it is known as Szerb Vajdaság. The name is made up of the Serb ethnonym and vojvod(ov)ina, a "domain ruled by a vojvoda" (the title of the revolutionary leader). By naming the self-proclaimed province a "voivodeship", recalling the Imperial privileges given to the Serbs through history, the Serb leaders sought to attain a self-government within the Habsburg Monarchy, headed by a Serb vojvoda. The Austrian leadership avoided naming the province a duchy (German: Herzogtum) and instead adopted the special administrative term Woiwodschaft.

== Background ==
=== Serbs in the Habsburg monarchy ===
The concept of a Serb political unit in the Habsburg monarchy was envisioned since the late 17th century. Following the Ottoman expansion in the late 14th century, Serbs began to cross the Danube and Sava rivers into what was then Hungarian lands. Only following the Great Serb Migrations did the Serbs in the Habsburg monarchy gather ecclesiastically and politically, under the leadership of Patriarch Arsenije III Crnojević. The Privileges defined the acquisition of lands within the monarchy to the Serbs, and the Austrian military command proposed areas in the southeastern Military Frontier to be settled with Serb soldiers. At the Krušedol Assembly (1708), the Serbs requested the Serbs within the Habsburg Kingdom of Hungary to be granted Bačka, Banat, Srem, and Slavonia. Serb representatives did not request any separate land until the Transylvanian Diet of 1790 when a demand for Banat was made based on the Privileges. The Serbs in the monarchy were not in the position to demand a specific land until 1848.

By 1840 data, Serbs formed relative majority of 49.1% in what would become Vojvodina (compared to absolute majority of 51.1% in 1828). Besides Serbs, these areas were also populated by some other ethnic groups such as Hungarians, Germans, Romanians and Croats.

=== Hungarian Revolution and split with Serb movement ===
With the outbreak of the Hungarian revolution, the Serbs who lived in the south of Hungary (which would become Vojvodina) sought equality and participation in the Hungarian assembly, official usage of Serbian in Serb-majority areas, and autonomy in predominant Serb areas. The Hungarian view of primacy, that all inhabitants belonged to the single Hungarian nation drew intolerance among the minorities. Serb demands were viewed of as an attack on Hungarian integrity. The Austrian court used the conflicts to win over minorities and remain in power. By the end of March 1848, the first verbal conflicts began in Pest between the Hungarian and Serb side when the Hungarian side declined the reasonable Serb demands. The opposition from the Hungarians which saw inequality in the state led to a more nationalistic approach among the Serb movement in southern Hungary. The Hungarian government, represented by Lajos Kossuth, claimed that the new Hungarian constitution granted freedom and equality to all in the country, however, this was not correct on the whole, and a Serb representative, Đorđe Stratimirović, noted this and asked for the Habsburg privileges to the Serbs to be respected and the Serbs given the status of a nation. Kossuth commented that only a people with its own government and state could become a nation, implying only the existing of the one Hungarian nation. A fierce conflict between the two sides ensued, and Stratimirović threatened they would seek the status of nation elsewhere, if not given by Hungary, and Kossuth replied that such a situation could only be resolved by war, and thus, the split between the Serb and Hungarian movement in the empire began.

During the 1848 Revolution, the Hungarians demanded independence from the Austrian Empire. However, they did not recognize the national rights of other nationalities which lived in Hungary at that time. Therefore, the Serbs of Srem, Bačka, Banat, Baranja took action to separate from the Hungary (which at that time was part of Habsburg Austria). After failed talks in Pressburg, the Serbs convened a "national diet", the May Assembly, in Sremski Karlovci that began on 1/13 May 1848.

== Government ==
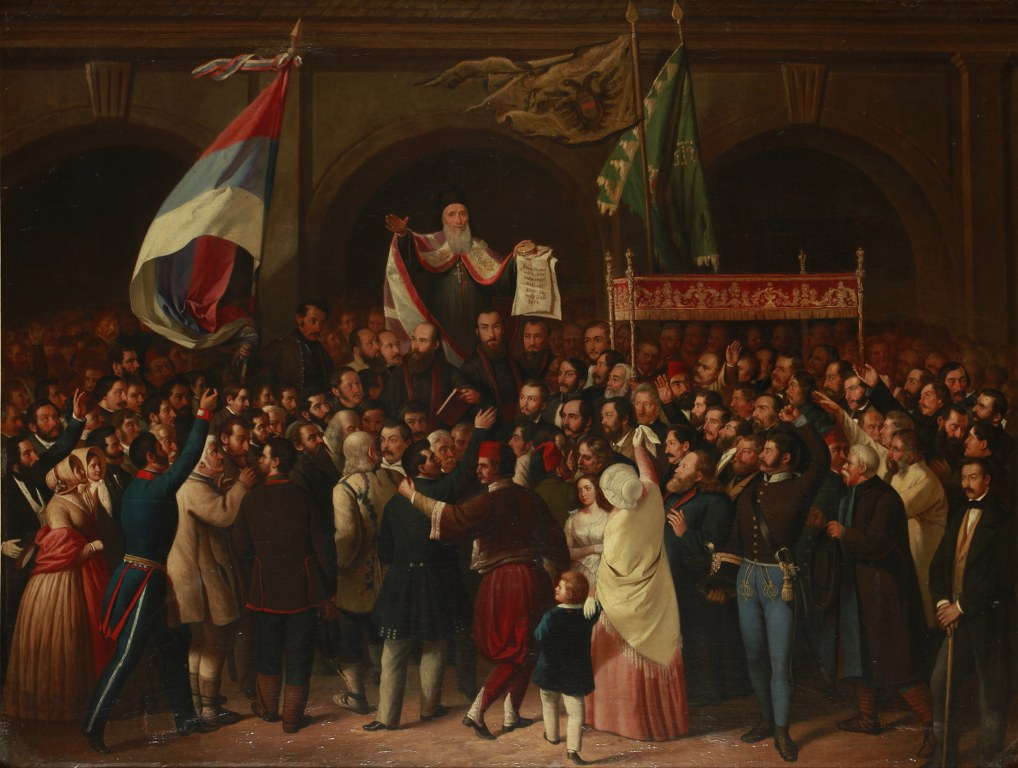
Proclamation of Serbian Vojvodina at the May Assembly in 1848 in Sremski Karlovci, by Pavle Simić (1818–1876)

The May Assembly (officially known as the "Serb National Assembly") was convened in Sremski Karlovci lasting from 13 to 15 May 1848. On the first day of the assembly, the metropolitan of Sremski Karlovci, Josif Rajačić, was elevated to Patriarch, and Stefan Šupljikac, a colonel of the Ogulin Regiment, was elected the vojvoda (commander, or "duke"). The borders of the "Serb Voivodeship" were delineated on the third day of the assembly, and the territory included Srem, Bačka, Baranja and Banat. An alliance with Croatia was anticipated. The Serb people were stated to be politically free and equal under the Habsburg dynasty and Hungary, and would not infringe on state integrity. The Serb National Board (or "Main Board", Glavni odbor) as the governing body was created. The Wallachian-Romanians were recognized as a separate people, to emphasize principles of equality of rights, and also, a proclamation was made to honor all rights of non-Orthodox people within the polity. The Main Board designated the delegations that would present the decisions at the May Assembly to emperor Ferdinand and the Croatian Assembly, while another delegation was sent to the Prague Slavic Congress.

The Main Board had 48 members of whom a smaller number were immediately elected to stay at Karlovci and receive petitions from the people. It was a de facto executive body, government, of the Serb people in rebel-held territory. At the very beginning, it had no actual executive power nor fixed scope of activities and seats of authority. Several departments were established, such as military, political, judicial, financial-economic and educational. With the progression of the Revolution, the Board became the highest governmental organ in the Voivodeship. In order to gain confidence among the people, district boards were established in larger towns such as Mitrovica, Zemun and Pančevo, and subcommittees in villages, in late May 1848. The first president of the Board was Patriarch Josif Rajačić, the spiritual leader of Habsburg Serbs, who also had the decisive word in the Board. The Board was authorized to use money from the people's treasury for its most urgent needs, with consent of the Patriarch and the assistants of the National Fund. The Assembly instructed the Board, in agreement with the Patriarch, to select persons who would submit its decisions to the Austrian monarch and the Croatian Parliament. For transparency, the newspaper Vestnik, up until then an editorial of Konstantin Bogdanović published in Pest, would become an organ of the National Board. In the absence of Patriarch Rajačić, who was part of the Serbian delegation in Vienna and Innsbruck for a long time, Đorđe Stratimirović was elected president of the Main Board. He explained in a proclamation that the Main Board was created to work for the benefit of the people until the vojvoda Stevan Šupljikac came, to ease his work. When the Hungarians began to prepare for war and set up several military camps on the territory of the Voivodeship, the Board, through several printed proclamations, called on the people to arm themselves, prepare for defense, join the ranks of the national army and give financial contributions. The Board encouraged the people to fight against the Hungarians, convinced them that the Emperor and King Ferdinand and his entire army agreed with the Serbs because the Hungarians wanted to overthrow the emperor and rule the entire empire. As relations strained and conflict approached, the Board changed the tone and manner of its address to the people, at first informing on events, appealing for unity and giving advice. With the outbreak of military conflict, the Board began to give orders and subsequently became the supreme authority of Vojvodina, and in that capacity on 10 June 1848 called on the Serbs to obey only its orders from now on.

Rajačić confirmed the alliance of Vojvodina and Croatia with ban Josip Jelačić at Zagreb. At Innsbruck, however, the May Assembly decisions were rejected due to the still good relations between Ferdinand I and the Hungarians. Ferdinand dubbed the May Assembly an "illegal gathering" of "my subjects of the Eastern Greek faith" and only acknowledged the Serb right to hold church assemblies and not national-political assemblies, acknowledged the Orthodox faith but not the Serb political nation. As the May Assembly were characterized as rebellion, the Hungarians were allowed by Ferdinand (influenced by the Hungarians) to quell it. A group in the Habsburg court, made up of especially generals, however met with Rajačić and offered cooperation as they did not share that opinion and prepared for the emperor's abdication. As the Habsburg Serbs feared a military conflict, they increased talks with Jelačić and the Principality of Serbia.

Hungary declared the May Assembly illegal and requested only a church assembly to be held by the Serbs, and the commissar of south Hungary, the Serb Petar Čarnojević did not take measures to quell the Serb efforts and was replaced by the strict Móritz Szentkirályi, while general of Peterwardein (Petrovaradin), John Hrabowsky, was ordered to quell the Serb movement, he hesitated until the Hungarian part of the Military Frontier was subjugated to the Hungarian cabinet. Smaller skirmishes and threats between the Hungarian National Guard and the Serbs in Bačka and Banat ensued. After general Hrabowsky's attack on Karlovci on 12 June, several members of the Board, especially older and more respectable, and more wealthier citizens, left Karlovci. Only supporters of the so-called Parties of Action, mostly youth, led by Stratimirović stayed in the Board. For the sake of safety, the Board moved to Zemun. Through the Board, the Serbian National Army was organized and Serbian military camps were established throughout the Voivodeship. The Board passed the "Law of War" on 18 July to raise the morale and ensure order and discipline. The Board highlighted Hungarian crimes against the innocent Serb population and invested in preserving unity between Serbs and Catholic Croats, preventing a religious conflict between them.

When the war was underway, in the Karlovci Assembly of 7–19 September, Rajačić took absolute power in the Main Board. Patriarch Rajačić's return from Innsbruck resulted in a conflict with Stratimirović, as the Patriarch wanted to rule over the entire movement and wanted to suppress Stratimirović who dubbed himself "supreme leader" of the people and army. After the National Assembly held in Karlovci in 7–19 September, the Patriarch managed to reorganize the Main Board, removing his opponents and the supporters of deposed Serbian Prince Miloš Obrenović. Stratimirović was marginalized with the vice-chairman title, left politically powerless, and was sent as a delegate to Vienna on resolving the "Serbian Question". In January 1849 the National Board rejected Rajačić's orders to arrest Stratimirović. Because of the absolutism of the Patriarch, including issuing orders without the Board's consent, appointing Ferdinand Mayerhofer the general of the Serb revolutionary army following the death of Šupljikac, introducing extraordinary courts and commissioners for Syrmia and Banat, in doing so bypassed the National Board, there was an open conflict. Since the Austrian Court, Serbian government and Serb conservatives of the Voivodeship stood behind Patriarch Rajačić in this dispute, and the army (now Austrian-led) did not support Stratimirović and the Board, Patriarch Rajačić broke any opposition. Patriarch Rajačić dissolved the National Board and reorganized it with members loyal to him.

May 1848 Board members:
- Andrija Bira from Vukovar.
- Andrija Rajić, parish priest from Sivac.
- Nikolaj Putnik, Šajkaši Battalion captain.
- Gavrilo Nikolić from Đurđevo.
- Petar Tomašević from Stari Banovci.
- Đorđe Nović from Sremska Kamenica.
- Đorđe Molović from Ruma.
- Trifun Mladenović from Irig.
- Svetozar Milutinović from Subotica.
- Petar Stojišić from Senta.
- Petar Despinić from Kovin.
- Nikola Tomašević from Klenak.
- Đorđe Đurković from Osijek.
- Mojsije Georgijević from Osijek.
- Toma Dimić from Tomaševac.
- Mihailo Krestić from Titel.
- Toma Sarajlić from Žabalj.
- Toma Krestić from Zagreb.
- Kosta Jovanović from Sremska Mitrovica.
- Kosta Radosavljević from Sombor.
- Teja Dimić from Bavanište.
- Stevan Ristić from Sremski Karlovci.
- Aleksandar Stojačković from Sremski Karlovci.
- Sima Radin from Novo Selo.
- Marko Drakulić from Cenad.
- Evgenije Arsenijević from Orlovat.
- Stevan Bekić from Perlez.
- Jovan Stanković from Farkaždin.
- Đorđe Varsan from Pančevo.
- Đorđe Ignjatović from Čobanci.
- Jovan Subotić from Pest.
- Đorđe Kojić from Budim.
- Jovan Hadžić from Novi Sad.
- Aleksandar Kostić from Novi Sad.
- Đorđe Stratimirović from Novi Sad.
- Đorđe Ivančević from Sremski Karlovci.
- Vasa Kavić from Petrinja.
- Vasa Vasiljević from Orsova.
- Đorđe Pantelić from Zemun.
- Đorđe Nedeljković from Bela Crkva.
- Đorđe Mušicki from Sentomaš.
- Đorđe Manojlović from Sentomaš.
- Jefta Vasić from Crepaja.
- Petar Ninković from Bukovac.
- Arsenije Kolarski of the Serb–Banat Regiment.
- Dimitrije Zavišić of the Serb–Banat Regiment.
- Gaja Pisarović of the Šajkaši Battalion.
- Kosta Konstantinović, parish priest from Perlez.

== Serb Revolution ==
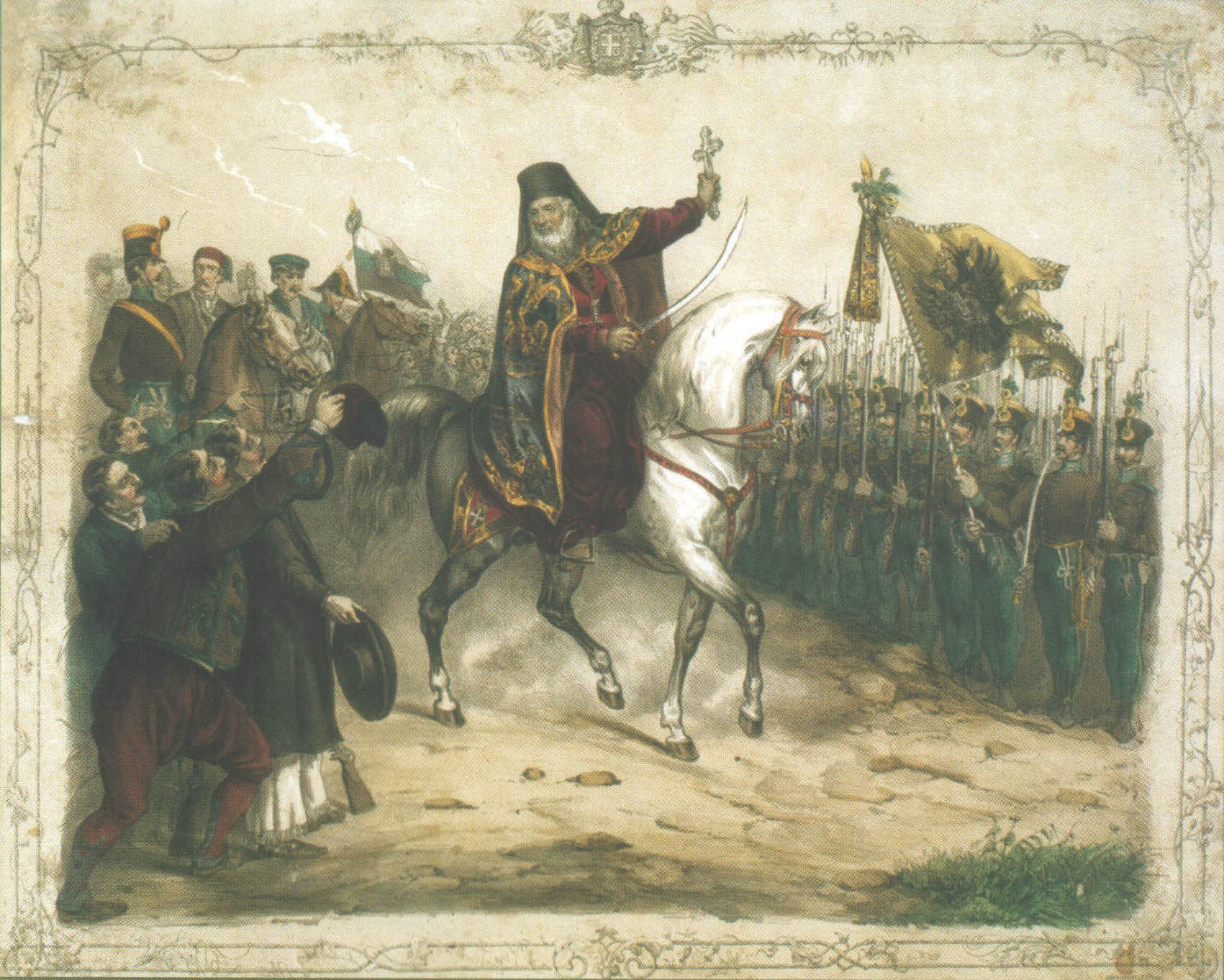
Patriarch Josif Rajačić blessing the Serb revolutionary army.

After smaller skirmishes and threats between the Hungarian National Guard and the Serbs in Bačka and Banat, Serb representatives asked for their protection, but general Hrabowsky rejected and claimed that there was "no such Serb people in Hungary or Austria" and that "he who wants to be a Serb may go there [to Serbia]". The Main Board issued a proclamation on Serb rights and called on Serbs to protect Sremski Karlovci. On June 11 a group of Šajkaši (river troops) arrived with cannons and ammunition and the next day Hrabowsky attacked, but the city was defended by the Šajkaši, Srem rebels, Banat Grenzers (frontier guards) and Serbian volunteers led by Stevan Knićanin. The attack on Sremski Karlovci marked the beginning of the Hungarian–Serbian conflict. A consequence of this war was the growth of conservative factions on both sides. Hungarian interior minister Bertalan Szemere considered the "Rascian Grenzer movement" to be treason, and Kossuth declared the Serbs to be answered through force or court-martial.

Fighting broke out in Bačka in the summer of 1848, but the Serbs held on and secured the territory, while Serb attempts to secure Banat failed. The heroic defense of Sentomaš led to its renaming to Srbobran ("Serb Defense"). Stratimirović became the most influential and respected among the Prečani Serbs by autumn 1848. On 6 October 1848 Šupljikac arrived at Karlovci, and Stratimirović, who was de facto commander of the Serb army, was forced to give over the command, and the army now became the "Imperial-Royal Austrian-Serb Corps". Stratimirović was made a delegate to Vienna in order to have him separated from the army and people. After Hungarian withdrawal from Banat at the beginning of 1849, when the Austrian army clashed heavily with the Hungarians, the Serb offensive succeeded in taking much of Bačka and all of Banat. This success was short-lived, as the Hungarian army regrouped and attacked in March 1849, managing to defeat the Austrian army and then inflicting heavy losses to the Serbs in Bačka and Banat. Most of Novi Sad was shelled and destroyed by the Hungarians on 12 June 1849.

The new emperor Franz Joseph issued the March Constitution on 4 March 1849 that promised regulation of Serb rights based on the 17th-century Privileges. This Imperial patent imposed constitutional reorganization of the Austrian Empire, and provided (in article 72) a formal base for the creation of a special administrative unit under the German name Woiwodschaft Serbien, also allowing the possibility for consequent association of that province with other crown lands. This Voivodeship was envisioned as a separate region attached to either Croatia, Hungary or Transylvania, however, on 4 April Hungary was divided into seven military districts, with the Seventh Military District, encompassing Srem, Banat and Bačka was put under the command of general Ferdinand Mayerhofer and Patriarch Rajačić was named commissioner for civilian affairs, thereby degrading the Serb movement.

Russian troops aided and defeated the Hungarian movement at the end of August 1849 at Világos. Finally, on 18 November 1849, the separate crownland of Voivodeship of Serbia and Banat of Temeschwar was created with Timişoara as capital and German as official language. It was an attempt by the Austrian government to reward the Serb loyalty during the revolutions against the Hungarians. However, as it was created at the fringes of Serb ethnic territory (the Military Frontier, with predominantly Serb population, was not included in the Voivodeship), with German as official language, contemporaries considered it to be "Serb" in name only. The autonomy sought at the May Assembly was far from the status attained in the crownland.

== Diplomacy ==
=== Croatia ===
Rajačić, as representative of the Serb National Board, confirmed the alliance of Vojvodina and Croatia with ban Josip Jelačić at Zagreb following the May Assembly. The Croatian Diet confirmed the alliance between the Triune Kingdom and Voivodeship in the VII legal article. On 5 June 1848 Rajačić enthroned Jelačić, on the advice of Ljudevit Gaj, which revolted the Catholic clergy. Jelačić avoided sending troops as per agreement and at the end of July met with Lajos Batthyány in Vienna and told him that he declined the Serb movement and had no relations to it. On 11 September Jelačić entered war with Hungary but not as a Serb ally, but as an Austrian general. Jelačić's troops aided in May 1849, entering Novi Sad.

=== Serbia ===
When the May Assembly was declared illegal by emperor Ferdinand, the Habsburg Serbs increased talks with Serbia, which sent arms, money, and volunteers. While Prince Aleksandar Karađorđević and Interior Minister Ilija Garašanin never issued any official document regarding gathering of volunteers, there were self-organized volunteers who crossed the Danube and Sava to fight in the revolution, and the Serbian media shows the government's enthusiasm towards these. In May 1848, the Serb Voivodeship delegation on a steamship was greeted enthusiastically by a huge crowd in Belgrade led by the Metropolitan of Belgrade Petar Jovanović, vojvoda Toma Vučić-Perišić, Minister of Education and Justice Aleksa Simić, and other Serbian dignitaries.

=== Montenegro ===
Petar II Petrović Njegoš was particularly interested in the Serb revolution. He sought for Serbia and Montenegro to unite at this moment against the Ottoman Empire. He was especially critical of Kossuth and proposed to send volunteers, but Garašanin did not support this, as it could result in an Ottoman intervention. Despite this, some Montenegrin volunteers managed to Vojvodina, while Njegoš continued to propose sending hundreds of volunteers. Njegoš gave up the idea of sending volunteers and instead offered moral support. Đorđe Stratimirović and Stevan Knićanin were both awarded the Montenegrin Obilić Medal for Bravery by Njegoš. Njegoš also thanked Serbia for its volunteers and held Knićanin in especially high esteem. When the Serb movement fell in crisis in April 1849, Njegoš began recruiting volunteers again, aiming at a thousand, and did this with the counsel of Russia and at the same time concluded a truce with the Pashalik of Scutari to ensure that they would not attack during the volunteers' absence, however, the readying of these volunteers could not be made quickly enough and in the meantime the fighting in Vojvodina had ended.

== Flag and coat of arms ==
The coat of arms of the Serbian Vojvodina was essentially the Austrian Habsburg imperial arms, with the coat of arms of the Serbs (Serbian cross, with four Cyrillic letters "S", on the chest of a black eagle). The bearer of the Serbian arms was the Austrian black eagle, instead of the Serbian white one, in order to show the fidelity of the newly established Voivodship to the Imperial Court in Vienna. The coat of arms was simply added to the Serbian national tricolour. Thus the flag differed from the flag of the Principality of Serbia, which had a different arms in the middle of its state flag.

== Legacy ==
There was an attempt to resurrect the Voivodeship as an ethnic Serb area within Hungary or rather the proposed Triune Kingdom, at the Annunciation Assembly (1861). The demands were never met and the Austrian government instead used the assembly as a threat against Hungary. With the creation of Austria-Hungary in 1867, the Serb service to the Habsburg monarchy had been forgotten, and in Vojvodina, the Serbs fell under Hungarian supremacy.

Serbia's wartime objectives during World War I included also the annexation of Vojvodina. The Austro-Hungarian authorities persecuted, arrested and interred prominent Serbs of Vojvodina immediately after the declaration of war in 1914. When the fall of Austria-Hungary was near, the Serbs in Vojvodina began to form committees, councils, and national guards in the largest towns. The Serb National Committee was formed on 31 October 1918 in Nagybecskerek (Zrenjanin) for the Novi Sad National Committee to be established on 3 November, to then convene the Great National Assembly in Novi Sad on 25 November which declared that Banat, Bačka, and Baranja would join the Kingdom of Serbia. By early November 1918, the Serbian army occupied Banat, Bačka, Baranja, and Srem. The territory became part of the Kingdom of Serbs, Croats, and Slovenes.

== Gallery ==
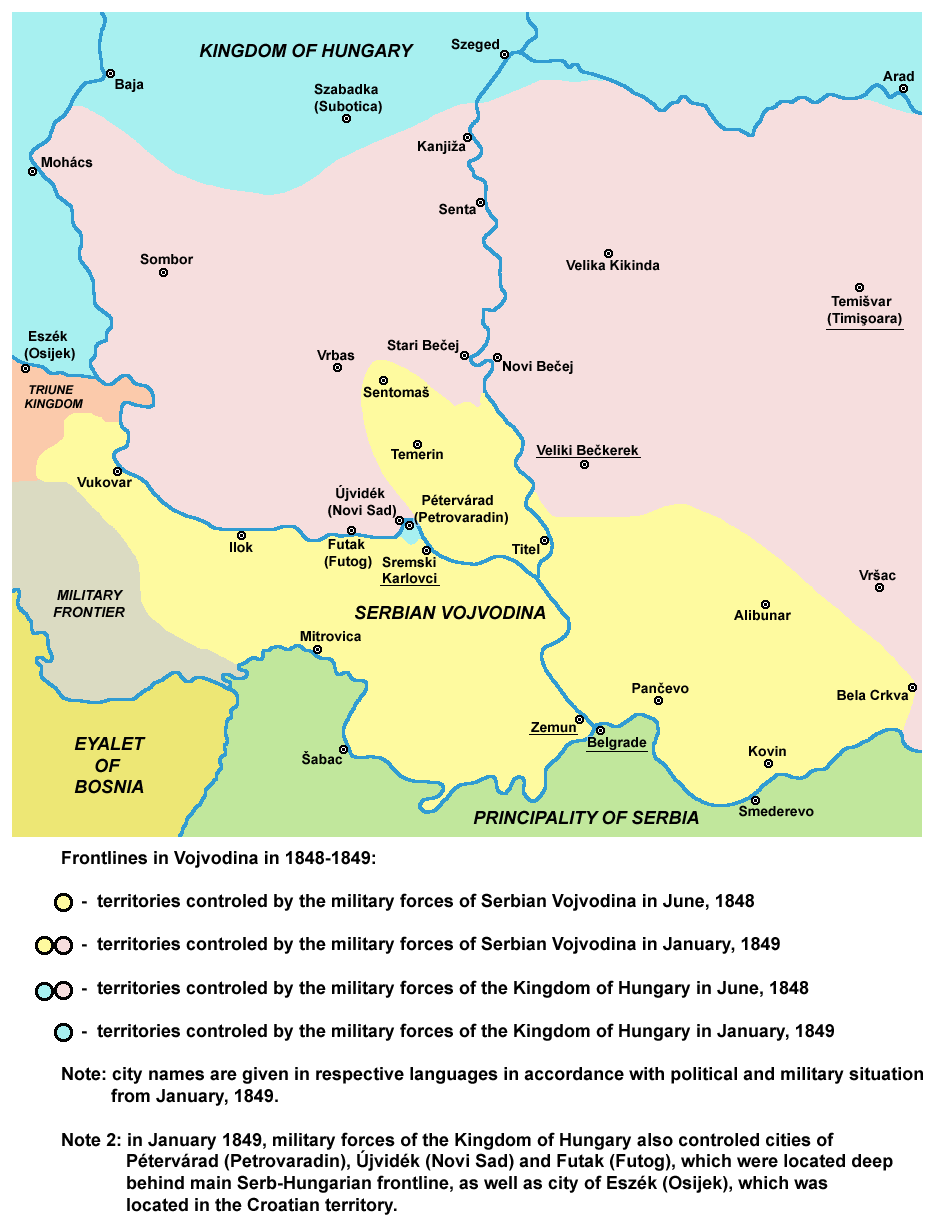
Frontlines in Vojvodina in 1848–1849

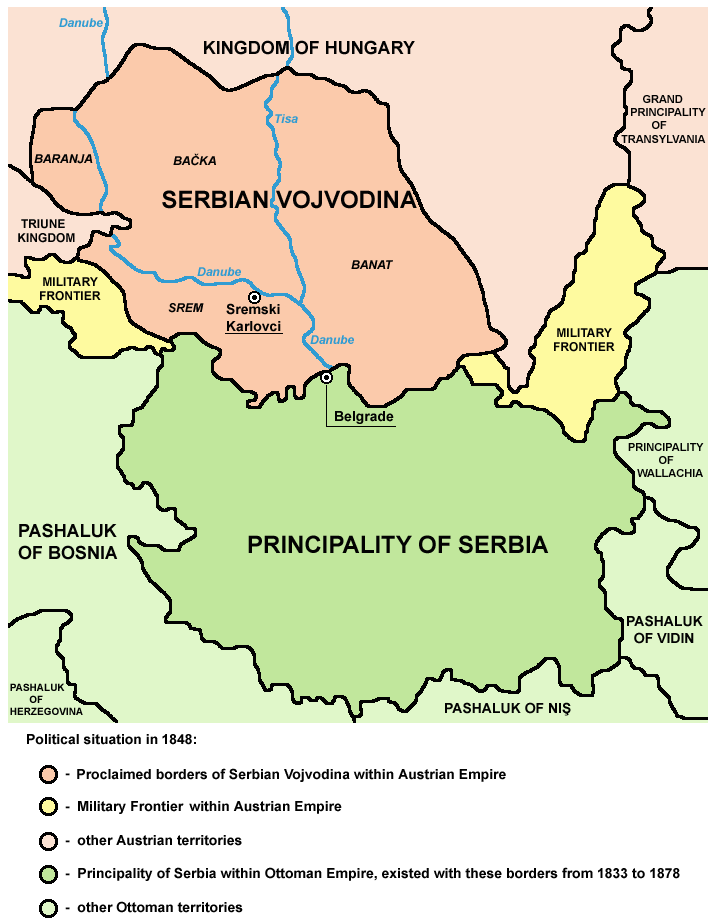
Principality of Serbia and Serbian Vojvodina in 1848.

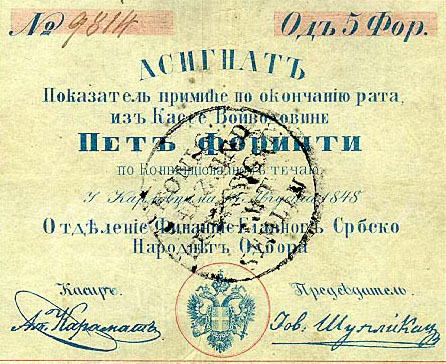
An assignat with the coat of arm of Serbian Vojvodina from 1848

== Notable people ==
- Josif Rajačić, Patriarch of Karlovci and Head of Main Board.
- Đorđe Stratimirović, general.
- Stevan Šupljikac, general.
- Stevan Knićanin, commander of Serbian volunteers.

== See also ==
- Voivodeship of Serbia and Banat of Temeschwar
- History of Vojvodina
- Revolutionary Serbia

== Annotations ==
1. The official name for the May Assembly was the "Serb National Assembly" (Serbian: Србскій Народный Соборъ). The governing body was known as the "Main Board of the Serb People" (Serbian: Главный Одборъ Народа Србскогъ) and "Serb National Board" (Serbian: Српски народни одбор). Other names are "Serbian Main Committee", "Central Committee", or simply "Main Board" (Serbian: Главни одбор, romanized: Glavni odbor).

== Sources ==
- Bataković, Dušan T. (2014). The Foreign Policy of Serbia (1844-1867): IIija Garašanin's Načertanije. Belgrade: Institute for Balkan Studies. ISBN 978-86-7179-089-5.
- Ćirković, Sima (2004). The Serbs. Malden: Blackwell Publishing. ISBN 978-1-4051-4291-5.
- Mikavica, Dejan (2011). Српско питање на Угарском сабору 1690-1918 [Serbian Question in the Hungarian Assembly 1690-1918]. Filozofski fakultet Novi Sad. ISBN 978-86-6065-064-3.
- Mikavica, Dejan (2005). Српска Војводина у Хабсбуршкој монархији: 1690-1920: историја идеје о држави и аутономији пречанских Срба [Serbian Vojvodina in the Habsburg Monarchy]. Stylos. ISBN 978-86-7473-215-1.
- Закључци Мајске скупштине одржане у Сремским Карловцима маја 1848. године, Сремски Карловци, 1848 – via Дигитална БМС
