= May Assembly =

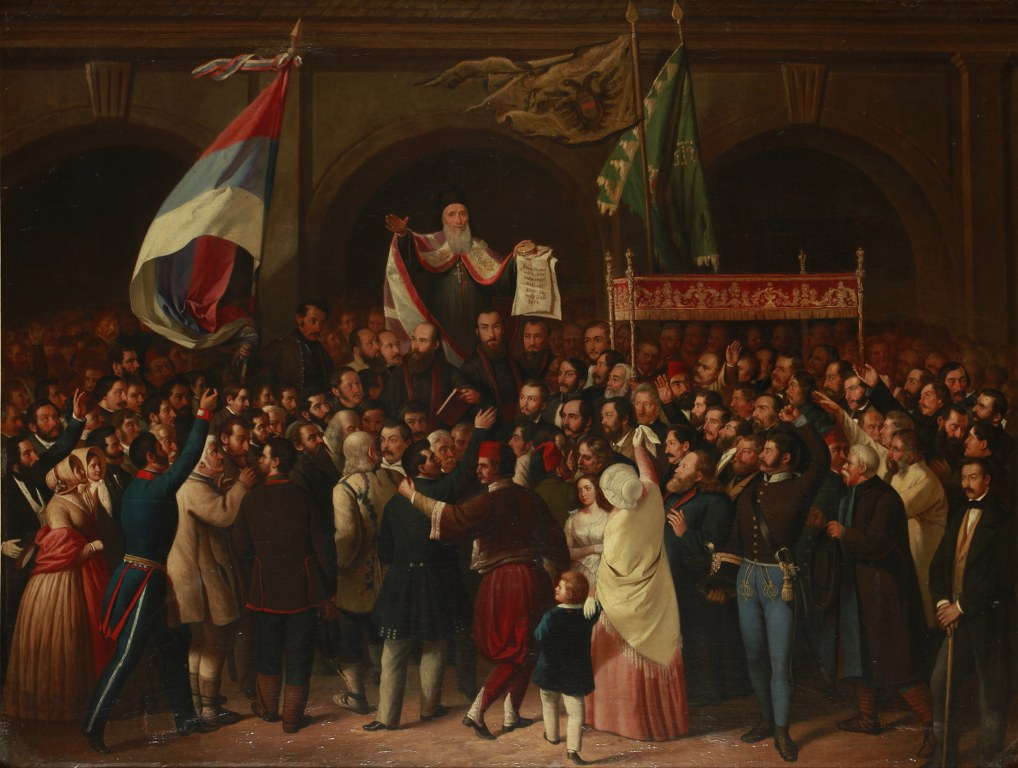
Proclamation of Serbian Vojvodina at the May Assembly in 1848 in Sremski Karlovci. Author: Pavle Simić (1818–1876)

May Assembly (Serbian: Мајска скупштина / Majska skupština) was the national assembly of the Serbs in Austrian Empire, held on 1 and 3 (O.S.) [13 and 15 (N.S.)] May 1848 in Sremski Karlovci, during which the Serbs proclaimed autonomous Serbian Vojvodina. This action was later recognized by the supreme Austrian authority in Vienna. The May Assembly was part of the European Revolutions of 1848.

== Prelude ==
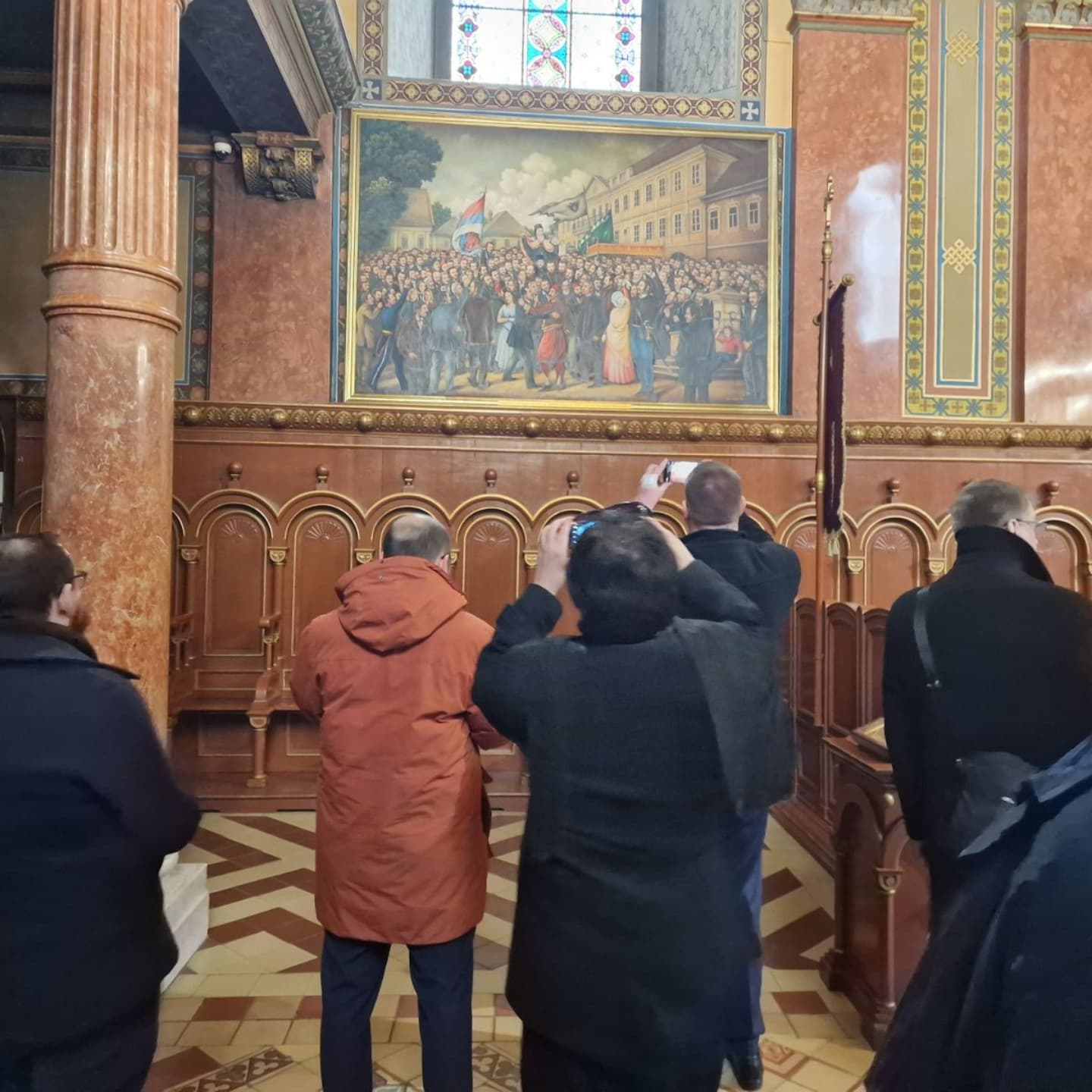
Picture of May Assembly in Sremski Karlovci with delegation of Slovak Matica

After news of the Paris revolution of 1848 reached the Austrian Empire, the absolutist reign of Klemens Wenzel, Prince von Metternich was weakened. At this time the regions of Banat, Bačka and Syrmia were administratively divided between the Habsburg Kingdom of Hungary (in the north) and the Habsburg Military Frontier (in the south). A sizeable percent of the Austrian soldiers serving on the Military Frontier were ethnic Serbs, who protected Austrian borders in exchange for certain political freedoms that they were able to enjoy within the frontier, whose administration functioned independently from the county-system of the Habsburg Kingdom of Hungary.

After the outbreak of the revolution in the Habsburg Kingdom of Hungary on 15 March 1848, the new government of the kingdom refused to accept the Serbs' request for recognition of their national rights, taking a stance that all citizens of the Kingdom of Hungary are Hungarians. Serbs, whose national rights and freedoms were previously regulated within the Habsburg monarchy saw the Hungarian position as a degradation of their status. After the initial Serb political demands for recognition of their national rights were rejected by the new government of the Kingdom of Hungary, Serb demands became more radical and the Serb national movement turned against the new revolutionary government of the Kingdom of Hungary.

== Assembly ==
Realizing that Hungarian revolutionary leaders are not willing to recognize national rights of the Serbs, political leaders of the Serbs decided to hold an assembly on which a separate Serb voivodeship within Austrian Empire would be proclaimed.

Assembly was held on 1–3 May 1848 in Sremski Karlovci (a town within the Habsburg Military Frontier). The beginning of the May Assembly was declared from the balcony of Sremski Karlovci City Hall. The assembly proclaimed a creation of Serbian Vojvodina and its political alliance with the Triune Kingdom of Croatia, Slavonia and Dalmatia.

During the assembly, Serbian Orthodox Metropolitan Josif Rajačić was elevated to the dignity of the Serbian patriarch (a title formerly held by Arsenije Čarnojević) while Stevan Šupljikac was declared for a Voivode (duke) of the newly formed voivodeship. Đorđe Stratimirović was elected for the Vožd (leader of Serb national movement).

== The decisions of the Assembly ==
The assembly officially adopted the following decisions:

- Serb nation is politically free and independent under the House of Austria and general Hungarian crown.
- We proclaiming Serbian Vojvodina, which includes Syrmia with the Frontier, Baranja, Bačka with the Bečej District and the Šajkaš Battalion, Banat with the Frontier and the Kikinda District.
- Serbian Vojvodina forming the political alliance with the Triune Kingdom of Croatia, Slavonia and Dalmatia.
- Permanent Serbian National Board is formed, as an executive body of the People's Assembly.
- We recognizing Vlach (Romanian) ethnic independence.
- We appointing the Board which will bring these decisions in front of the Emperor and the Croatian Assembly.
- We appointing delegation for the Slavic Congress in Prague.

== Aftermath ==
Decisions of the May Assembly were later recognized by the Austrian emperor, who reciprocated to Serbs for participating in the war against Hungarian rebels. First step was made by the Imperial Patent of 4th March (1849), known as the March Constitution, that imposed constitutional reorganization of the Austrian Empire. In article 72, it provided a formal base for the creation of a special administrative unit under the name: Vojvodina Serbia (German: Woiwodschaft Serbien), also allowing the possibility for consequent association of that province with other crown lands. Thus, the Voivodeship of Serbia and Temes Banat was formed in November 1849.

The new Voivodeship was independent from Habsburg Kingdom of Hungary and was directly subordinated to Vienna. It consisted of the regions of Banat, Bačka and Syrmia (municipalities of Ilok and Ruma), excluding parts that were within the Habsburg Military Frontier. This Voivodeship, however, had somewhat different borders from Serbian Vojvodina that was proclaimed in 1848 and essentially functioned as an administrative district. It was more ethnically mixed and included eastern parts of Banat with mainly Romanian population, while parts of the Military Frontier in which Serbs formed the majority were not included into new Habsburg crownland.

== See also ==
- Voivodeship of Serbia and Temes Banat
- History of Vojvodina
- History of Serbia
- Kingdom of Hungary (1526–1867)

== Sources ==
- Bataković, Dušan T., ed. (2005). Histoire du peuple serbe [History of the Serbian People] (in French). Lausanne: L’Age d’Homme.
- Bataković, Dušan T. (2014). The Foreign Policy of Serbia (1844-1867): IIija Garašanin's Načertanije. Belgrade: Institute for Balkan Studies.
- Ćirković, Sima (2004). The Serbs. Malden: Blackwell Publishing.
- Dedijer, Vladimir; Božić, Ivan; Ćirković, Sima; Ekmečić, Milorad (1974). History of Yugoslavia. New York: McGraw-Hill Book Company.
- Gavrilović, Vladan (2023). "The Serbian Vojvodina: Idea and borders until 1918". Istraživanja: Journal of historical researches. 34: 112–120.
- Jelavich, Barbara (1983). History of the Balkans: Eighteenth and Nineteenth Centuries. Vol. 1. Cambridge: Cambridge University Press.
- Krestić, Vasilije (1997). History of the Serbs in Croatia and Slavonia 1848–1914. Belgrade: BIGZ.
- Markus, Tomislav (2010). "The Serbian question in Croatian politics, 1848-1918". Review of Croatian History. 6: 165–188.
- Miller, Nicholas J. (1997). Between Nation and State: Serbian Politics in Croatia Before the First World War. Pittsburgh: University of Pittsburgh Press.
- Pavlowitch, Stevan K. (2002). Serbia: The History behind the Name. London: Hurst & Company.
