= Josif Rajačić =

Metropolitan of Sremski Karlovci, Serbian Patriarch

His Holiness Josif Rajačić Јосиф Рајачић
- Archbishop of Karlovci and Serbian Patriarch
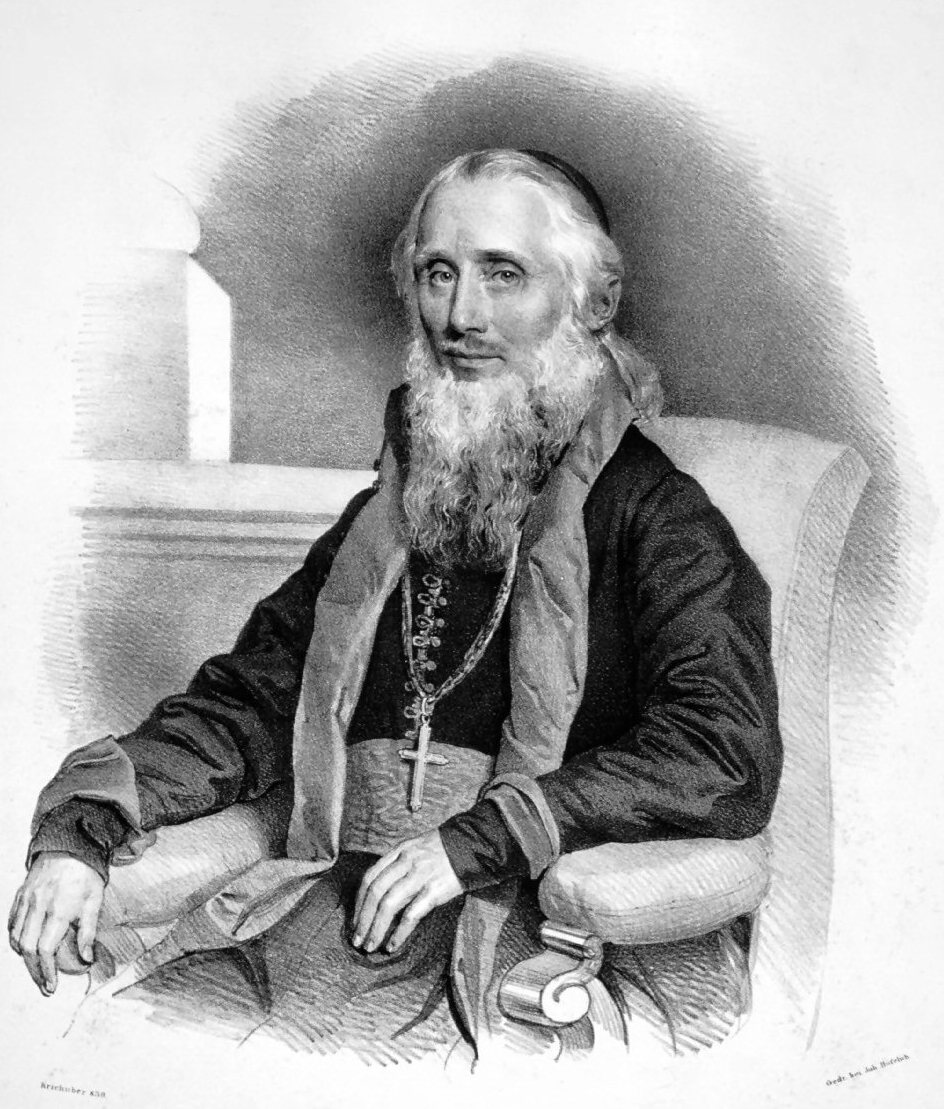
- Native name: Јосиф Рајачић
- Church: Serbian Orthodox Church
- Metropolis: Sremski Karlovci
- Installed: 26 January 1848
- Term ended: 1 December 1861
- Predecessor: Stefan Stanković
- Successor: Samuilo Maširević

Orders
- Ordination: 10 April 1810
- Consecration: 20 June 1829
- Rank: Patriarch

Personal details
- Born: Ilija Rajačić; 20 July 1785 Lučani near Brinje, Kingdom of Croatia, Kingdom of Hungary
- Died: 1 December 1861 (aged 76) Sremski Karlovci, Kingdom of Slavonia, Austrian Empire
- Buried: Serbian Orthodox Cathedral of Saint Nicolas in Sremski Karlovci
- Denomination: Eastern Orthodox
- Residence: Belgrade (1848–1861)
- Occupation: Administrator of Serbian Vojvodina
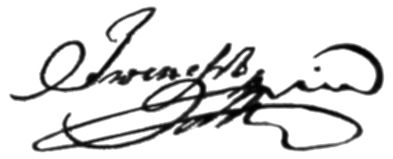
- Signature

Josif Rajačić (Serbian Cyrillic: Јосиф Рајачић; 20 July 1785 – 1 December 1861), also known as Josif Rajačić-Brinski, was the Serbian Orthodox Archbishop and metropolitan of Sremski Karlovci (1842-1848), and then the Serbian Patriarch of the Patriarchate of Karlovci (1848-1861). He also served as a provisional administrator of Serbian Vojvodina (1848-1849), and was a baron of the Austrian Empire.

== Life ==
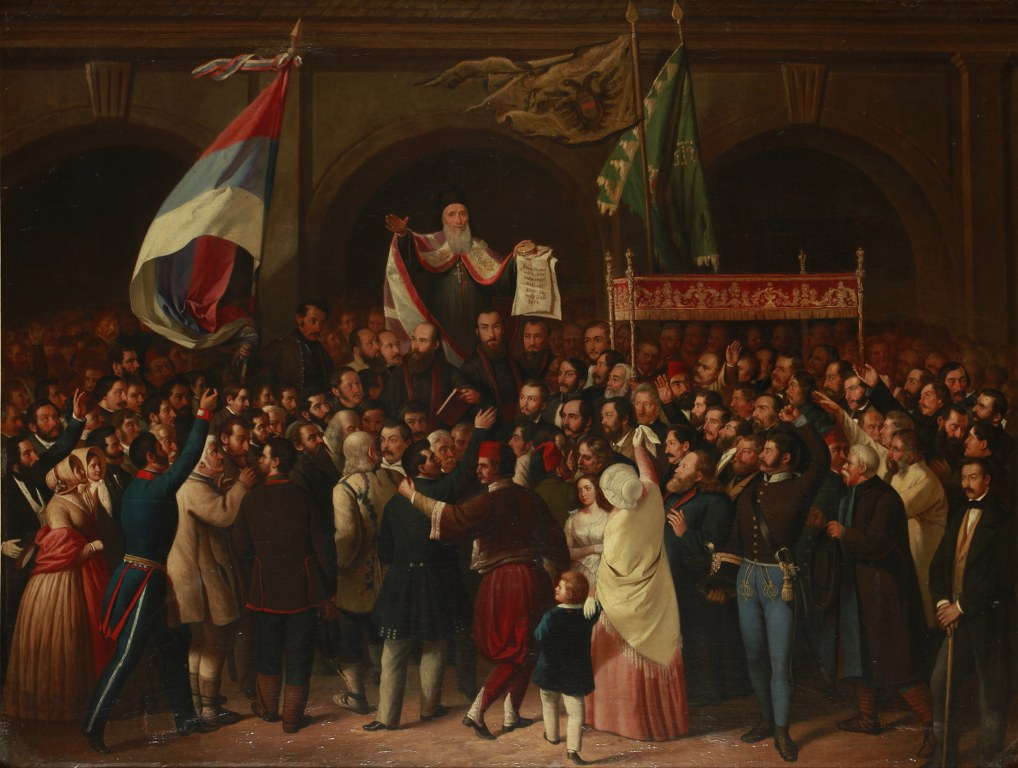
Proclamation of Serbian Vojvodina in Sremski Karlovci (1848), with Josif Rajačić at the centre

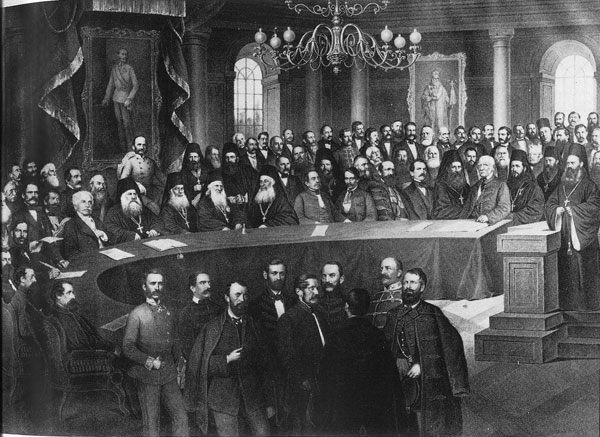
The Annunciation Council in Sremski Karlovci (1861)

Rajačić was born in Lučani, a former village near Brinje in Lika (then Habsburg monarchy, today Croatia). He studied in Zagreb, Karlovci, Szeged and Vienna before dropping out to join the Imperial Austrian Army in 1809 during the War of the Fifth Coalition. On 10 April 1810, he became a monk of the Serbian Orthodox Church in Gomirje Monastery. On 24 June 1829 he became the Eparch of Dalmatia. On 5 July 1833, he became the Eparch of Vršac. In August 1842, he was named the Metropolitan of Karlovci.

At the May Assembly of Serbs in Sremski Karlovci in 1848, from the balcony of the Sremski Karlovci town hall, he was appointed Patriarch of the Serbs, while Stevan Šupljikac was chosen as the first Duke (Voivode) of Serbian Vojvodina. Apart from being a spiritual leader, Rajačić shared political and military leadership of Serbs at the time of war.

He became administrator of Serbian Vojvodina, and was head of the new Serb government (praviteljstvo) of Vojvodina. Rajačić formed an alliance with the House of Habsburg after being promised autonomy for opposing the 1848 Hungarian Revolution. After the Hungarians were defeated, Rajačić was nominated civil commissioner of Vojvodina by the Austrian Empire.

Rajačić assisted the educational development of the Serb people in the Austrian Empire. In the time when he was metropolitan of Sremski Karlovci, many new Serbian schools were opened. He opened the Patriarchal Library and Print Works. Rajačić spent much of his energy attempting to bring Vojvodina under Serbian administration. On 5 June 1848, on the day of Josip Jelačić's inauguration as Ban of Croatia, Jelačić was appointed Ban in the Patriarch's presence due to Juraj Haulik's current absence from Zagreb.

He co-presided over the Annunciation Council, that was held in April 1861, in Sremski Karlovci.

He was decorated Order of Leopold and Order of the Iron Crown of the first class.

== See also ==
- Patriarchate of Karlovci
- Metropolitanate of Karlovci
- Rulers of Vojvodina
- History of Vojvodina
- History of Serbia
- Serbian Orthodox Church

== Sources ==
- Bataković, Dušan T., ed. (2005). Histoire du peuple serbe [History of the Serbian People] (in French). Lausanne: L’Age d’Homme. ISBN 978-2-8251-1958-7.
- Bataković, Dušan T. (2014). The Foreign Policy of Serbia (1844-1867): IIija Garašanin's Načertanije. Belgrade: Institute for Balkan Studies. ISBN 978-86-7179-089-5.
- Ćirković, Sima (2004). The Serbs. Malden: Blackwell Publishing. ISBN 978-1-4051-4291-5.
- Dedijer, Vladimir; Božić, Ivan; Ćirković, Sima; Ekmečić, Milorad (1974). History of Yugoslavia. New York: McGraw-Hill Book Company. ISBN 978-0-07-016235-8.
- Gavrilović, Vladan (2023). "The Serbian Vojvodina: Idea and borders until 1918". Istraživanja: Journal of historical researches. 34: 112–120.
- Jelavich, Barbara (1983). History of the Balkans: Eighteenth and Nineteenth Centuries. Vol. 1. Cambridge: Cambridge University Press. ISBN 978-0-521-25249-2.
- Krestić, Vasilije (1997). History of the Serbs in Croatia and Slavonia 1848–1914. Belgrade: BIGZ. ISBN 978-86-13-00888-0.
- Markus, Tomislav (2010). "The Serbian question in Croatian politics, 1848-1918". Review of Croatian History. 6: 165–188.
- Pavlowitch, Stevan K. (2002). Serbia: The History behind the Name. London: Hurst & Company. ISBN 978-1-85065-477-3.

Government offices
| Preceded by Stevan Šupljikac as Duke | Commissioner of Serbian Vojvodina; 15 December 1848 – 1849 | Succeeded by Franz Joseph as Grand Duke |
| Preceded by Stevan Šupljikac as Duke | Commissioner of Serbian Vojvodina; 15 December 1848 – 1849 | Succeeded by Ferdinand Mayerhofer as Governor of the Voivodeship of Serbia and Banat of Temeschwar |
Eastern Orthodox Church titles
| Vacant Title last held by Kalinik II as Patriarch of Serbs (Patriarch of Peć) | Patriarch of Serbs (Patriarchate of Karlovci); 1 May 1848 – 13 December 1861 | Succeeded by Samuilo |
| Preceded by Stefan Stanković | Metropolitan of Karlovci; 1842–1848 | Raising to Patriarchate |
| Preceded by Maksim Manuilović | Bishop of Vršac; 1833–1842 | Succeeded by Stefan Popović |
| Preceded by Venedikt Kraljević | Bishop of Dalmatia; 1829–1833 | Succeeded by Pantelejmon Živković |
