= Stevan Šupljikac =

Duke of Serbia, born 1786

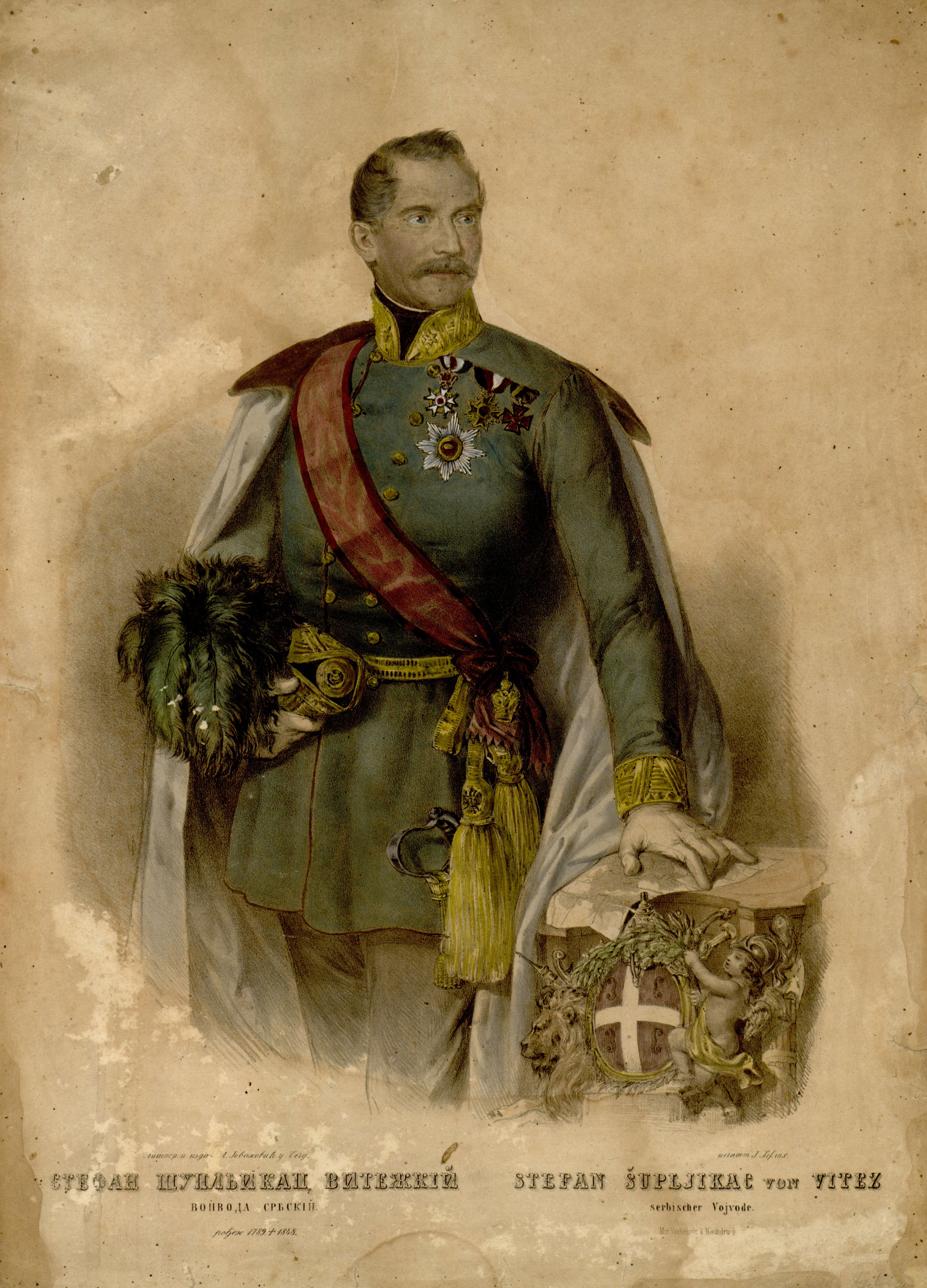

Duke of Serbian Vojvodina
- Reign: 1 May 1848 – 15 December 1848
- Predecessor: Title created
- Successor: Josif Rajačić (as Commissioner)
- Born: Stevan Šupljikac; 1786; Petrinja, Military Frontier, Habsburg monarchy (now Croatia)
- Died: 15 December 1848 (aged 62); Pančevo, Military Frontier, Austrian Empire (now Serbia)
- Burial: Krušedol
- Military career
- Allegiance: Austrian Empire; First French Empire
- Branch: Austrian Army; French Army
- Service years: fl. 1805–1814
- Rank: Officer; Colonel
- Conflicts: French invasion of Russia; Serb Uprising of 1848–49
- Awards: Légion d'honneur; Order of the Iron Crown

Stevan Šupljikac (Serbian Cyrillic: Стеван Шупљикац; (Note: His given name is Stevan or Stefan, his surname is Šupljikac. His name in other languages; Anglicized: Stephen Šupljikac, Slovak: Stépán Supljikac.) 1786 – 15 December 1848), known simply as Vojvoda Šupljikac was a Serbian voivode and the first voivode of the Serbian Vojvodina.

== Life ==
He was born in Petrinja, in 1786. He had a brother Jovan who was also a fighter, and a sister Anka who later married Gabriel Miletić.

He entered the Austrian army in 1805, subsequently becoming a general. Between 1806 and 1814 he was officer of the Imperial French army. During the Russian Campaign of 1812, he was awarded with the Légion d'honneur. In 1814, he again served as officer in the Austrian army, as a commander of the Ogulin regiment at Banat and Lika. He then was brigade commander under Joseph Radetzky von Radetz, after which he was awarded with the Great Cross of the Iron Crown. In 1848 he took part in the suppression of Italian rebels in the Unification of Italy.

As part of the Revolutions of 1848, the Serbs under Austria-Hungary demanded what they had in the previous century; recognition of Serbian as official language, equality of the Orthodox church as with Catholics, and annual church assembly gatherings. They met at Sremski Karlovci and Novi Sad. Several thousand Serbs met at the May Assembly in Sremski Karlovci on 1 May 1848. The delegates chose Šupljikac as voivode, the civil and military commander. Josif Rajačić was elected the patriarch of the Serbs. The Serbs demanded a national unit consisting of Banat, Bačka, Baranja and part of Srem, known collectively as Vojvodina.

During the revolutions, there was much fighting in Vojvodina, in June, Hungarian and Serbian bands began fighting. General Stratimirović, head of the main committee, on 10 May, urged Prince Aleksandar for assistance and asked Stevan Knićanin, a commissioner, to intercede. Knićanin was elected military commander. In June and July a large wave of volunteers from the Principality entered Vojvodina, Knićanin arrived at 25 July.

Hungarians were not friendly to the Serbs at this time, but support came from Vienna – the new emperor Franz Joseph approved the establishment of the Serbian Vojvodina, with Šupljikac as Duke. He became the supreme military commander of the Serbian national troops on 6 October. He died on 15 December, at Pančevo, he was buried in the Krušedol Monastery.

== Aftermath and legacy ==
Government offices
First	Duke of Serbian Vojvodina; 1 May 1848 – 15 December 1848	Succeeded by Josif Rajačić as Commissioner
First	Duke of Serbian Vojvodina; 1 May 1848 – 15 December 1848	Succeeded by Ferdinand Mayerhofer as Governor of the Voivodeship of Serbia and Banat of Temeschwar
Military offices
Vacant Title last held by Vojvoda Dimitrijević	Commander of Serbian national troops (In Habsburgs); 5 October 1848 – 15 December 1848	Unknown
Unknown	Commander of Ogulin regiment 1814	Unknown

== See also ==
- May Assembly
- Rulers of Vojvodina
