= Vasilije Krestić =

Serbian historian

- Василије Крестић
- Born: 21 July 1932 (age 93); Đala, Danube Banovina, Kingdom of Yugoslavia
- Occupation(s): Historian and academic

Vasilije Krestić (Serbian Cyrillic: Василије Крестић; born 20 July 1932) is a Serbian historian and a member of the Serbian Academy of Sciences and Arts.

== Biography ==
As a historian, he focuses on the history of the Serbs of the Habsburg monarchy. In his early career, Krestić wrote about the history of Croatia before and after the Nagodba of 1868, with special reference to the Serbs of Croatia and in Hungary. He has written numerous articles on related subjects.

In the mid-1980s Krestić became involved in the politics of nationalist opposition to communism in Serbia. He became a voice of discontent regarding the status of the Serbs of Croatia and helped to revive Serbian nationalism. He was one of the leading authors of the 1986 Memorandum of the Serbian Academy of Sciences and Arts, which was a founding document in the creation of the Serbian nationalist movement of the 1980s. Krestić's main contribution was in the sections that described the genocide against Serbs perpetrated by the Croatian fascist Ustasha in the Independent State of Croatia. Nationalist professors led by Krestić removed Dr. Drago Roksandić from the University of Belgrade in 1989, causing nine professors to publish an open letter in defence of Roksandić in the March 1990 issue of The New York Review of Books. In 1995, Krestić published a defense of the Memorandum, with Kosta Mihailović, another of the Memorandum's original authors. Krestić was also active in the defense of Slobodan Milošević before the International Criminal Tribunal for the former Yugoslavia (ICTY).

His son Petar Krestić is also prominent Serbian historian.

== Major works ==
- Крестић, Василије (1969). Хрватско-угарска нагодба 1868. године. Београд: САНУ.
- Крестић, Василије (1980). Историја српске штампе у Угарској 1791-1914. Нови Сад: Матица српска.
- Крестић, Василије (1981). "Срби у Хабсбуршкој Монархији 1849-1868". Историја српског народа. Vol. књ. 5, св. 2. Београд: Српска књижевна задруга. pp. 107–150.
- Krestić, Vasilije (1983). Srpsko-hrvatski odnosi i jugoslovenska ideja 1860-1873: Studije i članci. Beograd: Narodna knjiga.
- Krestić, Vasilije (1988). Srpsko-hrvatski odnosi i jugoslovenska ideja u drugoj polovini XIX veka. Beograd: Nova knjiga. ISBN 9788673350479.
- Крестић, Василије (1991). Историја Срба у Хрватској и Славонији 1848-1914. Београд: Политика. ISBN 9788676070404.
  - Krestić, Vasilije (1997). History of the Serbs in Croatia and Slavonia 1848-1914. Belgrade: BIGZ. ISBN 9788613008880.
- Крестић, Василије (1994). Из историје Срба и српско-хрватских односа: Студије, чланци, расправе и есеји. Београд: БИГЗ. ISBN 9788613007548.
- Крестић, Василије (1995). Грађа о Србима у Хрватској и Славонији (1848-1914). Vol. 1. Београд: БИГЗ. ISBN 9788613008156.
- Крестић, Василије (1995). Грађа о Србима у Хрватској и Славонији (1848-1914). Vol. 2. Београд: БИГЗ. ISBN 9788613008156.
- Крестић, Василије (1998). Геноцидом до Велике Хрватске. Нови Сад-Београд: Матица српска, Архив Србије.
  - Krestić, Vasilije (1998). Through Genocide to a Greater Croatia. Belgrad: BIGZ. ISBN 9788613009108.
  - Krestić, Vasilije (2001). La grande Croatie: Le génocide comme projet politique. Lausanne: L'Age d'Homme. ISBN 9782825113950.
- Крестић, Василије (2001). Бискуп Штросмајер у светлу нових извора. Београд: САНУ.
- Крестић, Василије (2006). Бискуп Штросмајер: Хрват, великохрват или Југословен. Јагодина: Гамбит.
- Крестић, Василије (2013). Срби у Угарској 1790-1918. Нови Сад: Матица српска.
- Krestić, Vasilije (2015). "The Serbs in Hungary during the First World War". The Serbs and the First World War 1914-1918. Belgrade: Serbian Academy of Sciences and Arts. pp. 43–56. ISBN 9788670256590.
- Крестић, Василије (2017). Великохрватске претензије на Војводину, Босну и Херцеговину. Београд: САНУ.
- Крестић, Василије; Радојевић, Мира (2017). Јасеновац. Београд: САНУ.
