= Ivan Božić (historian) =

Yugoslavian historian and academic

- Иван Божић
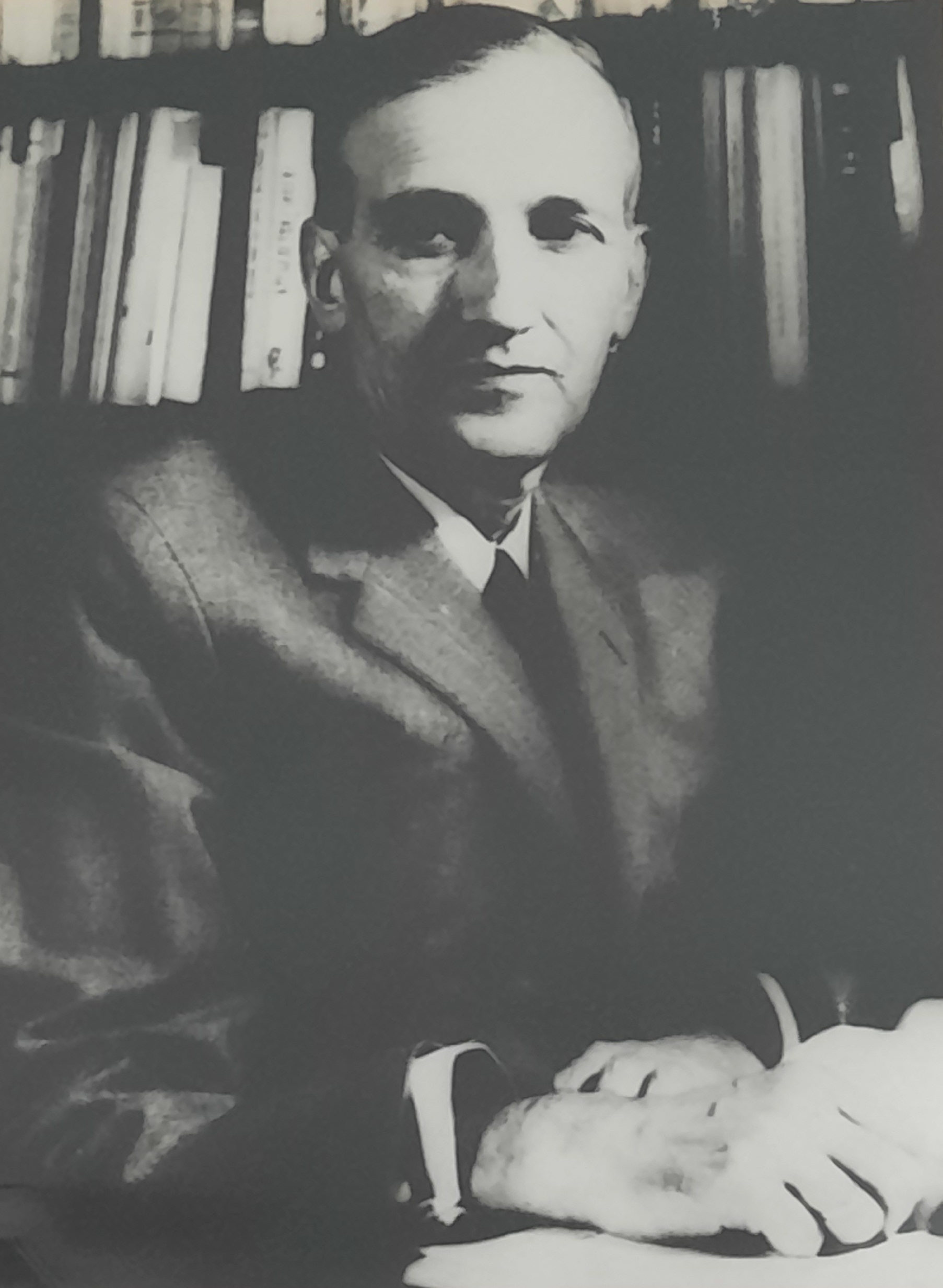
- Born: 23 April 1915; Makarska, Kingdom of Dalmatia, Austro-Hungary
- Died: 20 August 1977 (aged 62); Belgrade, SR Serbia, SFR Yugoslavia
- Education: University of Belgrade
- Occupation: historian

Ivan Božić (Serbian Cyrillic: Иван Божић; 23 April 1915 – 20 August 1977) was a Yugoslavian historian and academic. He was expert in history of medieval Zeta and the Venetian Republic's policy toward its coastal areas.

== Works ==
- Dubrovnik i Turska u XIV i XV veku (in Serbian). Belgrade: Naučna knjiga. 1952. OCLC 4620136.* Božić, Ivan (1950). "O položaju Zete u državi Nemanjića". Istorijski glasnik. 3 (1–2): 97–122.
- Dubrovnik i Turska u XIV i XV veku , Naučna knjiga, Belgrade, 1952.
- Dohodak carski-povodom 198. člana Dušanovog zakonika , Naučno delo, Belgrade, 1956.
- Paštrovske isprave 16.-18. vijeka, Naučno delo, Belgrade, 1959
- Pregled istorije jugoslovenskih naroda, Zavod za izdavanje udžbenika Narodne Republike Srbije, Belgrade, 1960.
- Istorija ljudskog društva i kulture od najstarijih vremena do XI veka za I razred gimnazije, Zavod za izdavanje udžbenika Socijalističke Republike Srbije, Belgrade, 1962.
- Pregled istorije od XI do XIX veka a II razred gimnazije prirodno-matematičkog smerra, Zavod za izdavanje udžbenika Socijalističke Republike Srbije, Belgrade, 1963.
- Božić, Ivan (1970). "Doba Balšića (drugi deo)". Istorija Crne Gore (PDF). Vol. knj. 2, sv. 2. Titograd: Redakcija za istoriju Crne Gore. pp. 49–133.
- Božić, Ivan (1970). "Zeta u Despotovini". Istorija Crne Gore (PDF). Vol. knj. 2, sv. 2. Titograd: Redakcija za istoriju Crne Gore. pp. 135–275.
- Božić, Ivan (1970). "Vladavina Crnojevića". Istorija Crne Gore (PDF). Vol. knj. 2, sv. 2. Titograd: Redakcija za istoriju Crne Gore. pp. 277–370.
- Istorija Jugoslavije, Prosveta, Belgrade, co-author
- Pregled istorije od XI do XX veka za II razred gimnazije prirodno-matematičkog smerra, Zavod za udžbenike i nasdtavna sredstva Srbije, Belgrade, 1973, co-author
- Nemirno pomorje XV veka (in Serbian). Belgrade: Srpska književna zadruga. 1979. OCLC 5845972.
- Božić, Ivan (1982). "Raspad mletačkog sistema u Primorju". Istorija srpskog naroda. Vol. knj. 2. Beograd: Srpska književna zadruga. pp. 403–413.

Academic offices
Preceded by Jorjo Tadić	Dean of the Faculty of Philosophy; 1962–1964	Succeeded by Mihailo Marković
