= Maxim Suvorov =

Director of the printery of the russian synod

Максим Суворов
- Born: Maxim Suvorov; Максим Суворов; 17th century
- Died: 14 April 1770; Moscow
- Occupations: philologist; typographer

Maxim Suvorov was the director of the printing house of the Russian Synod. He studied at the Slavic Greek Latin Academy.

In August 1725, he was sent to Vojvodina at the request of the Metropolitanate of Karlovac (Mojsije Petrović) to teach the local population in Latin and Slavic. He came to Karlovci first on 5 May 1726 and the school on 1 October of the same year (1726) was opened, thanks to the efforts of Bishop Mojsije Petrović. But after four months he was moved to Belgrade, where he continued his work on 1 February 1727.

Metropolitan Vikentije Jovanović arrested him in 1736 on charges of espionage in favour of the Russian Empire and secret correspondence. Shortly afterwards, he returned to Russia and was appointed director of the Moscow Synod Printing House. He died in April 1770 and was buried in Moscow.

Maxim Suvorov laid the foundations for an educational system of primary and secondary schools in Serbia. He contributed to the development of Slavonic-Serbian with Civil Script.

== See also ==
- Kingdom of the Slavs
- Juraj Križanić
- Illyrian movement
- Corfu Declaration
