= Declaratory Rescript of the Illyrian Nation =

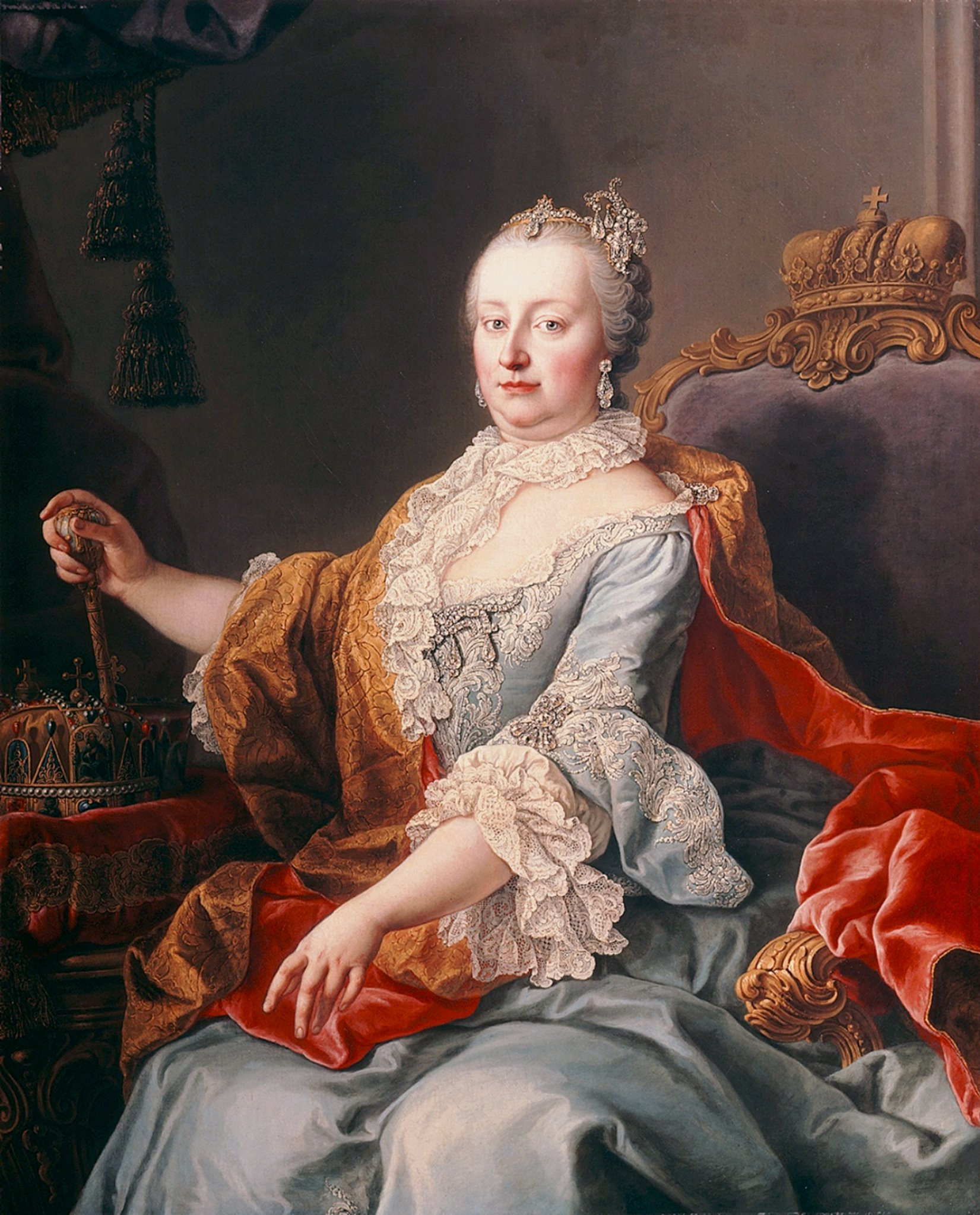
Empress and Queen Maria Theresa (b. 1717-d. 1780)

Declaratory Rescript of the Illyrian Nation (Latin: Rescriptum Declaratorium Illyricae Nationis; Serbian Cyrillic: Деклараторни рескрипт илирске нације, Деклараторија) was issued on 16 July 1779 by Maria Theresa, Dowager-Empress and Queen of Hungary (1740-1780). It was a royal rescript, issued in response to a series of petitions made by Eastern Orthodox subjects of the Habsburg monarchy, regarding the regulation of their religious freedom and ecclesiastical autonomy. The document was the result of a process, initiated by previously issued Regulamentum privilegiorum (1770) and Regulamentum Illyricae Nationis (1777), both of them replaced by the royal rescript of 1779.

== History ==
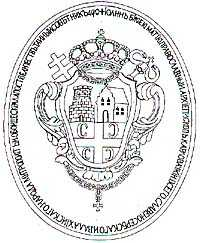
Insignia of the Metropolitanate of Karlovci

The Rescript contained detailed regulations on the organization of the Metropolitanate of Karlovci, that was established in 1708, as an autonomous ecclesiastical province of Eastern Orthodox Christians in the Habsburg monarchy, who were mainly Serbs and Romanians.

The Serbs who were established on Hungarian territory since 1690 were designated as the "Illyrian nation" under Leopold I of Habsburg (1656-1705), reviving an archaic term in a classicizing manner, inconsistent with the use of the term Illyrian up to that point. The so-called Illyrian privileges were meant to encourage the Orthodox faithful to join the imperial army against the Ottoman Empire in the Balkans.

After the Ottoman border stabilized in 1739, the Habsburg Empire no longer prioritized the privileges for the Serbs, as their military role became less important, and supporting religious diversity ran counter to their general policies of centralization. At the same time, especially under Maria Theresa (1740-1780), the privileges were extended to various Eastern Orthodox subjects, including Serbs, Romanians and other smaller groups.

During the reign of Maria Theresa and her predecessors, several assemblies of Habsburg Serbs were held, with royal consent, sending their grievances and petitions to the Habsburg court.

In 1777, the Illyrian Court Deputation in Vienna was abolished. The reaction from the Orthodox clergy and faithful to this reduction of autonomy was violent.

In response to that, the Rescript of 1779 regulated, on some issues restrictively, many important questions, from the procedures regarding the elections of Eastern Orthodox bishops, to the management of dioceses, parishes and monasteries. With small changes, the Rescript was upheld in force until it was replaced by the "Royal Rescript" issued on 10 August 1868.

In 1791, the special office in Vienna was briefly reinstated as the Illyrian Imperial Chancellery.

After the Peace of Schonbrunn of 1809, the term Illyrian Provinces referred to a different subset of territories in former ancient Illyria.

== See also ==
- Great Migrations of the Serbs
- Arsenije III Crnojević
- Arsenije IV Jovanović
- Metropolitanate of Karlovci

== Sources ==
- Bocşan, Nicolae (2015). "Illyrian privileges and the Romanians from the Banat" (PDF). Banatica. 25: 243–258. Archived from the original on 2019-01-02.
- Ćirković, Sima (2004). The Serbs. Malden: Blackwell Publishing. ISBN 9781405142915.
- Gavrilović, Slavko (1993). "Serbs in Hungary, Slavonia and Croatia in struggles against the Turks (15th–18th centuries)". Serbs in European Civilization. Belgrade: Nova, Serbian Academy of Sciences and Arts, Institute for Balkan Studies. pp. 41–54.
- Gavrilović, Vladan (2023). "The Serbian Vojvodina: Idea and borders until 1918". Istraživanja: Journal of historical researches. 34: 112–120.
- Lins, Joseph (1910). "Illyria". The Catholic Encyclopedia. Vol. 7. New York: Robert Appleton Company. pp. 663–664.
- Martin, Joannes Baptista; Petit, Ludovicus, eds. (1907). "Serborum in Hungaria degentium synodi et constitutiones ecclesiasticae". Sacrorum conciliorum nova et amplissima collectio. Vol. 39. Parisiis: Huberti Welter, Bibliopolae. pp. 497–956.
- Pavlovich, Paul (1989). The History of the Serbian Orthodox Church. Serbian Heritage Books. ISBN 9780969133124.
- Radić, Radmila (2007). "Serbian Christianity". The Blackwell Companion to Eastern Christianity. Malden, MA: Blackwell Publishing. pp. 231–248. ISBN 9780470766392.
- Točanac-Radović, Isidora (2018). "Belgrade - Seat of the Archbishopric and Metropolitanate (1718–1739)". Belgrade 1521-1867. Belgrade: The Institute of History. pp. 155–167.
- Točanac-Radović, Isidora (2022). "The Great Migration of Serbs and the Question of the Serbian Ethnic and Religious Community in the Habsburg Monarchy". Migrations in the Slavic Cultural Space: From the Middle Ages to the Present Day. Łódź: Łódź University Press. pp. 15–27.
- Todorović, Jelena (2006). An Orthodox Festival Book in the Habsburg Empire: Zaharija Orfelin's Festive Greeting to Mojsej Putnik (1757). Aldershot: Ashgate Publishing. ISBN 9780754656111.
