= Sofronije Podgoričanin =

Serbian metropolitan bishop

Sofronije Podgoričanin (Podgorica, Montenegro, 1668 – Arad, then part of the Habsburg Empire, 7 January 172) was a Serbian Orthodox bishop who served in the Eparchy of Slavonia from 1705 to 1710 and was elevated to the Metropolitan of Krušedol (Sremski Karlovci) from 1710 to 1711.

== Early life ==
Sofronije Podgoričanin was born in Podgorica in what is now Montenegro but was then part of the Ottoman Empire. He joined the monastic order as a youngster at a monastery and after completing his theological studies in Peć, joined the clergy.

== Career ==
Sofronije became an archimandrite at the Patriarchate of Peć and when Bishop Jovan of Papraća Monastery died in 1694, he was named the monastery's administrator and exarch of Patriarch Arsenije III Čarnojević. With the patriarch, he migrated north to the Serbian territories, then under Austrian and Hungarian rule.

After bishop Petronije Ljubibratić died and his brother Janićije (Ljubibratić) succeeded him in the Eparchy of Slavonia, Podgoričanin was named successor by Arsenije III.

In 1703, the Hungarians, under the leadership of Transylvanian Prince Francis II Rákóczi, rebelled against the Austrians, demanding Hungarian independence from the Habsburg monarchy. Vienna then eased the pressure on the Serbs, hoping to pacify them because of Austria's need for assistance in dealings with Hungary. Patriarch Arsenije III replaced the Uniate Bishop of Pakrac with Bishop Sofronije Podgoričanin, in 1705. The following year, Patriarch Arsenije III sent the Austrian Emperor a written request that the Serbian Orthodox Church, political, economic, and military rights be spared further restrictions. In 1706, Emperor Joseph I (1705-1711) reconfirmed the privileges granted to the Serbs by Leopold I.

The second Krušedol sabor of 1710 was held to elect a replacement for Isaija Đaković, who died in 1708. Newly elected Metropolitan Sofronije Podgoričanin was prevented by the Austrians from swearing allegiance to the Patriarch of Peć. However, Patriarch Kalinik I (1691-1710) gave his blessings as well as an official scroll confirming the Metropolitan of Krušedol, and at the same time, extended a form of autonomy to him and his See. Despite Vienna's meddling in Serb affairs, the Serbian Orthodox adherents slowly entrenched their communal organizations and settled themselves permanently.

Podgoričanin's early death prompted the calling of a third assembly (sabor) in April 1713, in Sremski Karlovci. For two years, the Church in that region was spiritually leaderless until Vikentije Popović-Hadžilavić (1713-1725) was elected.

Sofronije Podgoričanin is remembered as a defender of Serbian interests in the Pakrac region during the reign of Joseph I. He was one of the most important metropolitans of the Serbian Orthodox Church of the time.

== See also ==
- Metropolitanate of Karlovci

== Sources ==
- Bataković, Dušan T., ed. (2005). Histoire du peuple serbe [History of the Serbian People] (in French). Lausanne: L’Age d’Homme. ISBN 978-2-8251-1958-7.
- Ćirković, Sima (2004). The Serbs. Malden: Blackwell Publishing. ISBN 978-1-4051-4291-5.
- Stanojević, Stanoje (December 10, 1925). Narodna enciklopedija srpsko-hrvatsko-slovenac̆ka. Bibliografski zavod d.d. – via Google Books.
