= Vasilije Romanovich and Jov Vasilijevich =

18th-century icon painters

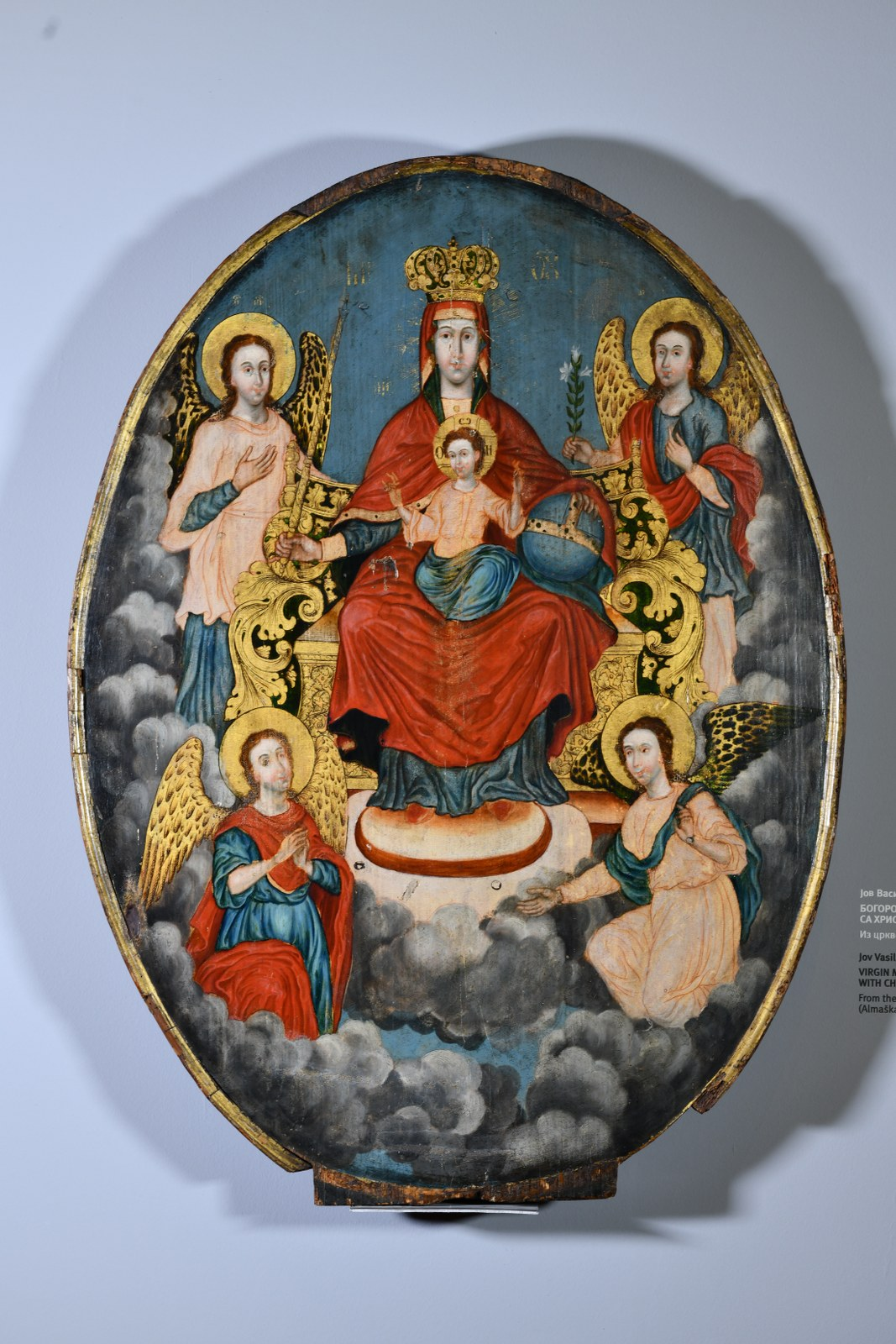
The Virgin Mary, Queen of Heaven, with Christ and the Archangels by Jov Vasilijević, 1750

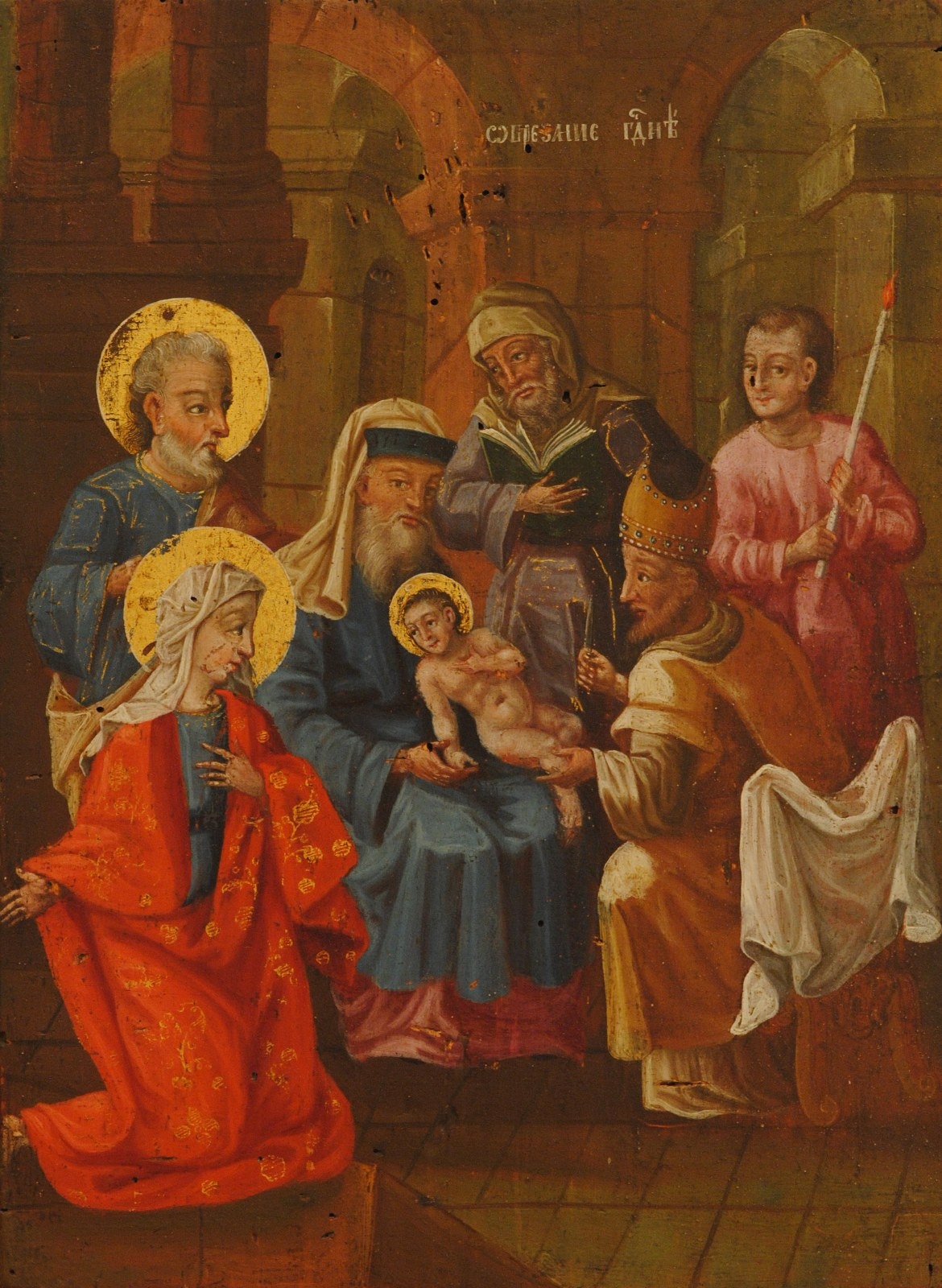
The Circumcision of Christ by Vasilije Romanović, 1765

Vasilije Romanovič (Kiev, Imperial Russia, c. 1700 - Hopovo, (Note: Either Staro Hopovo Monastery or Novo Hopovo Monastery, which are next to each other; possibly the latter, because Romanovič had stayed there in 1758.) now Serbia, 1773) and Jov Vasilijevič (Kiev, Imperial Russia, c. 1700 - Kiev, Imperial Russia, after 1760) were accomplished icon painters who came from Imperial Russia to Srem on an invitation from the Arsenije IV Jovanović Šakabenta together with a group of Serbian newly graduated academic artists of the Kiev Pechersk Lavra. Romanovič became part of the teaching staff of a newly-constructed Academy of Painting, built and funded by the metropolitan, while Vasiljevič became a court painter of the Metropolitanate of Karlovci.

Romanovič settled in the Monastery of Hopovo where he became tonsured as a monk and where he died in 1773. His painting can be found in every church and monastery throughout Fruska Gora and other neighbouring regions, including Besenovo Monastery, Pravoslavna Crkva Roždestva Presvete Bogorodice, Serbian Orthodox church in Slatinski DrenovacBogorodicina crkva in Morović and many others.

Vasiljevič wall-painted the Monastery of Krušedol. In the narthex, the old fresco painting of Krušedol was replaced with the new one in 1750 and in 1751 the painting of the altar area was completed. The wall painting of the naos, completed in 1756 was done by another graduate of the painting school of Kiev Pecharsk Lavra, Arad-born Stefan Tenecki, who arrived from Imperial Russia at the same time after a four-year study absence.

Also, Vasiijevič painted in collaboration with several other contemporary Serbian painters.
