= Isaija Antonović =

Serbian Metropolitan

Isaja II
- Metropolitan of Karlovci, Bishop of Arad
- Church: Serbian Orthodox Church
- Installed: 1748
- Term ended: 1749

Orders
- Consecration: 15 December 1731

Personal details
- Born: Jovan Antonović; 1696; Budapest. Habsburg monarchy
- Died: January 22, 1749 (aged 52–53); Vienna, Habsburg Monarchy

Isaija II (Antonović), also referred to Isaija II (secular name: Jovan Antonović; 1696, Budapest – 22 January 1749, Vienna), was the eight metropolitan of Karlovci from 1748 until his death in 1749, a significant year for the Serb minority in the Habsburg monarchy. It was a time when the Serbian metropolitan and his subordinates were petitioning Maria Theresa to allow their immigrants from Venetian and Turkish lands to settle, have priests and build churches in the empire.

== Biography ==
He was born in Budapest in 1696 to a prominent family of merchants and craftsmen who had moved from Novi Pazar to Buda with Patriarch Arsenije III Crnojević. His parents, Antonije and Suzana Antonijević, named him Jovan at his baptism in the Serbian Orthodox Church. The family's financial standing and the cultural and political life of the Serb community at Buda undoubtedly influenced Jovan Antonović's choice after marrying to become a priest and pursue a teaching career. When he became a widower, he decided to join the Serbian Kovin Monastery where he was tonsured; on the island of Csepel, he took the monastic name of Isaija. In 1731, he began slowly ascending a few rungs on the ecclesiastical scale of the Karlovci Metropolitanate to the rank of Archimandrite of the Monastery of Kovin, where he was also made Bishop of Arad on 15 December of that year. With another bishop - Nikola Dimitrijević of Timišvar - he was instrumental in getting a Serbian divinity college established in the region. Metropolitan Mojsije Petrović sent him as his deputy to the Varaždin Generalate to conduct a canonical visit. However, the authorities did not receive him because he allegedly was a friend of priest Nikola, who called for border guards to revolt.

Beyond the knowledge of the church authorities, he was confirmed in 1741 as the bishop of Vršac, which led to some unrest at the church-national assembly in Sremski Karlovci in 1744, but it all simmered down. He was elected Metropolitan of Karlovci at the Church and People's Assembly in Sremski Karlovci on 27 August 1748, under the condition that he had to swear an oath where the part that emphasized the dependence of the Metropolitan of Karlovci on the Patriarchate of Peć, which was later dropped. A few days after, he was elected Metropolitan on 31 August 1748. He would make one appeal to the people: he requested that voluntary contributions be made for the purpose of establishing a college fund for higher education. Shortly afterward, on September 2, 1748, the Holy Synod of Bishops made the decision to refer the Bishop of Osijek to the Bishop Sofronije (Jovanović) of Pakrac in the Eparchy of Slavonia. Ten years later, in 1758, the Bishop of Osijek was once again returned to the Metropolitanate of Karlovci.

He died in Vienna on 22 January 1749 at the age of 53. He was buried on 6 February at St. Dimitrije's Congregational Church in Budapest. This church was demolished after World War II by the communists.

He was succeeded by Pavle Nenadović.

== Legacy ==
Metropolitan Isaija II demonstrated great zeal for the defence of Orthodoxy and the Serbian people and the rights conferred on them by the Privilegium.

== See also ==
- Metropolitanate of Karlovci
