= Mojsije Petrović =

Serbian Metropolitan

- Metropolitan of Belgrade-Karlovci
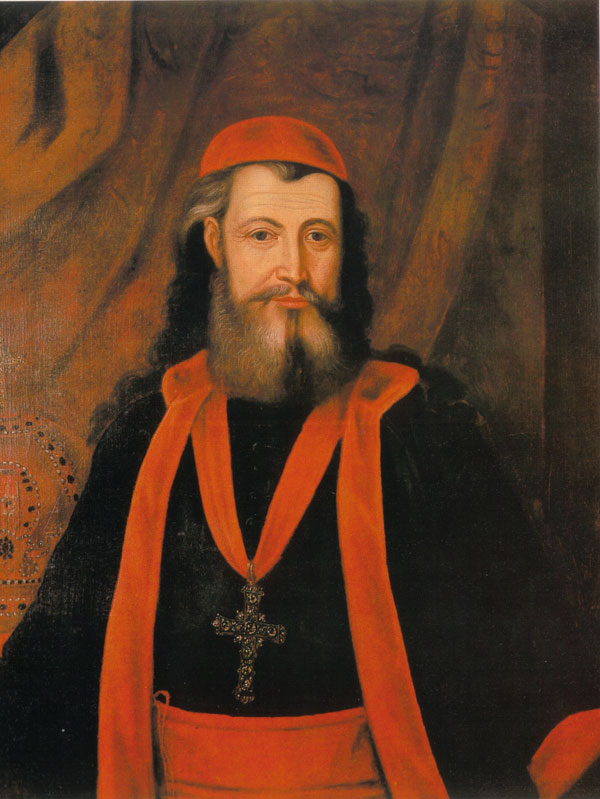
- Church: Serbian Orthodox Church
- Metropolis: Metropolitanate of Belgrade-Karlovci
- Installed: 1726
- Term ended: 1730
- Predecessor: Vićentije Popović
- Successor: Vićentije Jovanović

Personal details
- Born: 1677 Belgrade, Ottoman Empire
- Died: 1730, 27 July Belgrade, Habsburg monarchy
- Denomination: Eastern Orthodox

Mojsije Petrović (Serbian Cyrillic: Мојсије Петровић; Belgrade, Ottoman Empire, 1677 – Belgrade, Habsburg monarchy, 27 July 1730) was the first Metropolitan of the unified Metropolitanate of Belgrade and Karlovci, from 1726 to 1730. As such, he exercised great influence among the Serbian and Romanian Orthodox faithful in the Habsburg Monarchy.

His close friendships with Prince Eugene of Savoy and Count Claude Florimond de Mercy contributed substantially to Charles VI's victories at the Battle of Petrovaradin in August 1716, Belgrade (1717), and the conquest of the Banat of Temesvár over the Ottoman Turks.

The opportunity to elect a prelate for dual function emerged in 1725 after the death of Metropolitan Vićentije Popović of Karlovci. Following his funeral, the high clergy convened in the Krušedol Monastery and wrote an official demand to the Emperor to summon an Assembly in order to elect a new Metropolitan of Karlovci. The plea was accepted, and the Assembly finally gathered in Karlovci in 1726. Despite all Imperial efforts to prevent the election of Mojsije Petrović to the post, the members of the Assembly unanimously won an important diplomatic victory. What was still lacking was full Imperial recognition that Charles VI, Holy Roman Emperor did not grant to the newly chosen prelate on the occasion of his ceremonial installation in Karlovci.

After the election of the previous Metropolitan Vićentije Popović in 1713, the administration was transferred in its entirety from Krušedol to Karlovci. This establishment of the official seat was given the seal of Imperial approval in the charter of Charles VI issued in October 1713. Having received this dual Imperial and ecclesiastical approval, metropolitans gave to Karlovci in the following years two landmarks that would denote it as an unquestionable see of power. New archiepiscopal residence was built and elevated the existing Church of St. Nicholas to the rank of Cathedral. With these initial efforts, the rise of Karlovci commenced as the political, commercial, and increasingly, as the cultural capital of the Orthodox Serbs in the Habsburg Monarchy.

== Biography ==
Mojsije Petrović was a native of Belgrade. He was born in 1677 to Petar and Jelisava Petrović, who later became a nun. During this period of intermittent Ottoman occupations, there was a significant number of Phanariots who settled in Belgrade from Fener quarters of Constantinople. These Phanariots were a class of moneyed, ethnically Greek merchant opportunists who "claimed" distant Byzantine descent, and who exercised influence in the administration of Belgrade. Mojsije, in order to obtain a good education, had little choice but to enroll in the Greek school. Later, he became a good connoisseur of the Greek language and was chosen at one point to join a Belgrade delegation to Istanbul (Constantinople). Besides his Greek education, he learned more science at the court of Patriarch Arsenije III Čarnojević in Szentendre. Later, he left for Peć where he continued to further his education before taking monastic vows and becoming a celibate monk.

== Metropolitan of Dabar-Bosna ==
In 1709, Mojsije (Petrović) was consecrated by Serbian Patriarch Kalinik I as Metropolitan Bishop of the Metropolitanate of Dabar-Bosna, a post he would hold until 1713.

== Metropolitan of Belgrade ==
Addressing Peter the Great (by correspondence) for the second time, in 1721, Metropolitan Mojsije revealed to him the difficulties that he incurred from Catholic propaganda, and then asked him to be the second Apostle of Christ among the Serbs."We do not ask for wealth, but help for learning the teachings and for the weapons of our souls to confront those who are fighting against us." On May 22, 1722, the emperor ordered that the Serbian Orthodox Church be sent textbooks and two teachers, both graduates of the Kyiv Theological Academy, Maxim Suvorov, a synodic translator, and his brother Peter. The Russian state treasury allocated the Suvorovs 300 rubles a year's salary, while the other 300 were voted for a Greek teacher, who was also needed and whom the metropolitan could choose. With the Suvorov brothers came 70 copies of Slavonic grammar by Meletius Smotrytsky, 10 copies of Polycarp's three-leaf dictionary, and 400 primers. Maksim Suvorov came to Karlovci first on 5 May 1726 and the school on 1 October of the same year (1726) was opened, thanks to the efforts of Bishop Mojsije. But after four months he was moved to Belgrade, where he started work on 1 February 1727.

On 2 December 1724, Mojsije issued a Decree comprising 57 items with which he began bringing order to the clergy and people. His intention was to eliminate the flaws that he perceived as a consequence of the Turkish or non-Orthodox rule and past wars. As the clergy, due to their modest material circumstances and lifestyle did not differ much from the parishioners, the Metropolitan intended to primarily regulate their appearance and conduct in order to make them distinct and recognizable. The Decree determined the duties of parish priests regarding the building and furnishing of churches and the improvement of education.

== Metropolitan of Belgrade and Karlovci ==
The unification of the Metropolises of Belgrade and of Karlovci was successfully accomplished in the people and the church councils between 1718 and 1735, thanks to Metropolitan Mojsije, the bold worker and reformer. The issue arose in 1718 when the newly conquered areas of Serbia and Banat were not spiritually joined to the already existing Metropolis-Archbishopric of Karlovci, but a new, Metropolitanate and Archbishopric of Belgrade was established. To the Serbian clergy and the Orthodox population, this division was not only unnatural but unacceptable. The 1722 election of the Metropolitan Mojsije Petrović of Belgrade for the co-adjutor post or, better said successor of Metropolitan Vikentije Popović-Hadžilavić of Karlovci (1713–1725) became the first step toward unification of the two autonomous regions. Both councils in Belgrade and Karlovci held separate assemblies and came up with the same decision to elect Mojsije as the co-adjutor, except Charles VI, Holy Roman Emperor (as the Habsburg monarchy was then called) would not recognize him. The decision of the councils and the people's will became binding despite the Emperor's opposition. Mojsije with the help of Count Claude Florimond de Mercy was able to solve the immigration issue from Ottoman territories.

Under Metropolitan Mojsije's leadership and the subsequent metropolitans, the number of Serbian and Romanian schools increased and primary and secondary education became more readily available to all nationals in the Habsburg monarchy belonging to the Eastern Orthodox faith.

He was succeeded by Vikentije Jovanović.

== See also ==
- Metropolitanate of Karlovci
- List of heads of the Serbian Orthodox Church

== Sources ==
- Ćirković, Sima (2004). The Serbs. Malden: Blackwell Publishing. ISBN 978-1-4051-4291-5.
- Dabić, Vojin S. (2011). "The Habsburg-Ottoman War of 1716-1718 and Demographic Changes in the War-Afflicted Territories". The Peace of Passarowitz, 1718. West Lafayette: Purdue University Press. pp. 191–208. ISBN 978-1-55753-594-8.
- Đorđević, Miloš Z. (2010). "A Background to Serbian Culture and Education in the First Half of the 18th Century according to Serbian Historiographical Sources". Empires and Peninsulas: Southeastern Europe between Karlowitz and the Peace of Adrianople, 1699–1829. Berlin: LIT Verlag. pp. 125–131. ISBN 978-3-643-10611-7.
- Milošević, Ana (2019). "Belgrade Metropolitans on the Baroque Stage". Baroque Belgrade: Transformation 1717-1739. Belgrade: Institute of Archaeology. pp. 74–95.
- Ninković, Nenad (2020). "The Rise of a new center on the periphery of the Empire through the influence of the Archbishops of Karlovci 1690-1790". The Habsburg State-wide and the regions in the Southern Danube basin (16th-20th centuries). Wien: New Academic Press. pp. 25–44. ISBN 978-3-7003-2199-6.
- Točanac-Radović, Isidora (2018). "Belgrade - Seat of the Archbishopric and Metropolitanate (1718–1739)". Belgrade 1521-1867. Belgrade: The Institute of History. pp. 155–167. ISBN 978-86-7743-132-7.
- Točanac-Radović, Isidora (2019). "Belgrade Under Habsburg Rule 1717-1739". Baroque Belgrade: Transformation 1717-1739. Belgrade: Institute of Archaeology. pp. 12–37.
