= Vićentije Popović =

Metropolitan of Karlovci

- Metropolitan of Krušedol-Karlovci
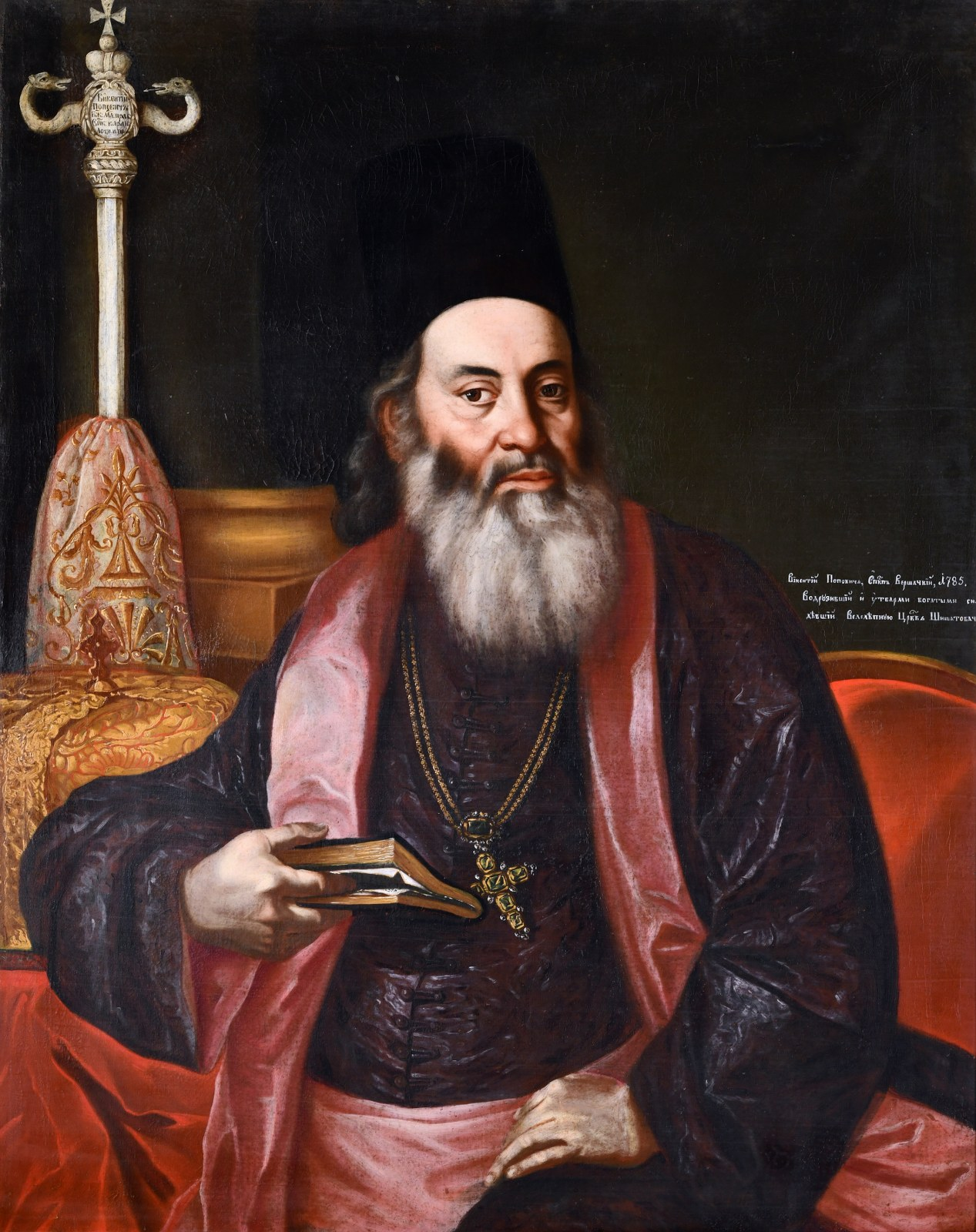
- Church: Serbian Orthodox Church
- Metropolis: Metropolitanate of Karlovci
- Installed: 1713
- Term ended: 1725
- Predecessor: Sofronije Podgoričanin
- Successor: Mojsije Petrović

Personal details
- Born: 1650 Janjevo, Ottoman Empire
- Died: 23 October 1725 (aged 74–75) Karlovci, Habsburg monarchy
- Denomination: Eastern Orthodox

Vićentije Popović (Serbian: Вићентије Поповић; 1650–1725) was the metropolitan of the Serbian Orthodox Metropolitanate of Karlovci, and the highest-ranking prelate of the Serbian Orthodox Church in the Habsburg Monarchy, from 1713 to 1725.

He used two patronymics, Popović, and Hadži-Lavić (Хаџи-Лавић) or Hadžilavić (Хаџилавић). His father, Lav Popović, was a daskal (teacher). Vićentije was born in the village of Janjevo, at the time part of the Ottoman Empire (now southeastern Kosovo), and he took monastic vows in the Patriarchal Monastery of Peć. Like all of the early metropolitans of Sremski Karlovci, Vikentije also spent his early career in the Patriarchate of Peć where he received his education.

In January 1708 he was elected as Eastern Orthodox Bishop of Buda (modern Budapest, capital of Hungary). Upon election to the metropolitan throne in 1713, he initially resided in the Monastery of Krušedol, that was plundered during the Austro-Turkish War (1716-1718), forcing him to transfer metropolitan residence to Sremski Karlovci, thus creating the base for change of title from Metropolitanate of Krušedol to Metropolitanate of Karlovci.

== See also ==
- Eparchy of Buda
- Metropolitanate of Karlovci
- List of heads of the Serbian Orthodox Church

== Sources ==
- Bataković, Dušan T., ed. (2005). Histoire du peuple serbe [History of the Serbian People] (in French). Lausanne: L’Age d’Homme. ISBN 9782825119587.
- Ćirković, Sima (2004). The Serbs. Malden: Blackwell Publishing. ISBN 9781405142915.

Eastern Orthodox Church titles
Preceded by Sofronije	Metropolitan of Krušedol-Karlovci; 1713–1725	Succeeded by Mojsije
