= Isaija Đaković =

Serbian metropolite

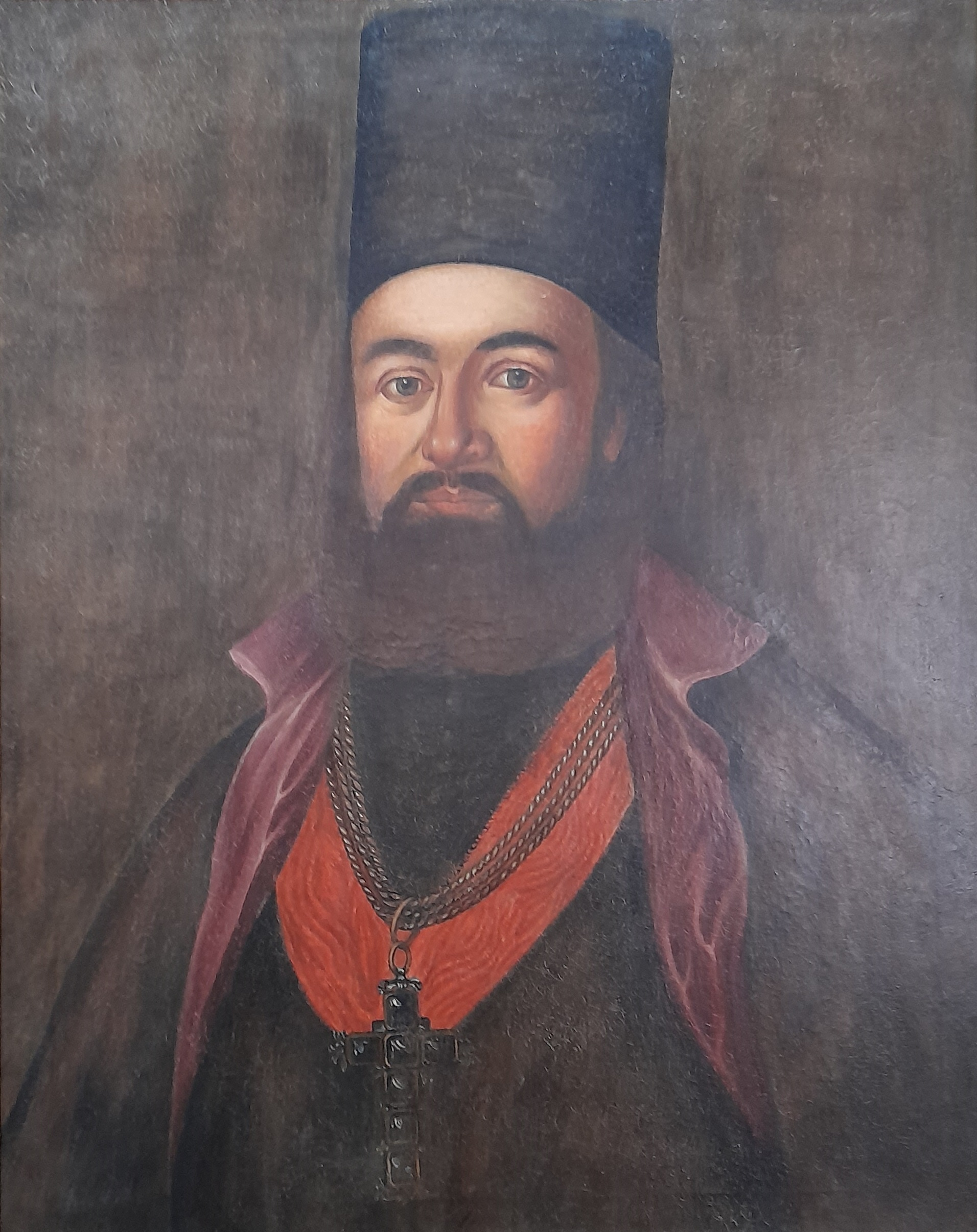
- Born: c. 1635; Stari Slankamen, Habsburg monarchy
- Died: 20 July 1708; Vienna, Habsburg monarchy

Isaija Đaković or Isaija I (Grabovac, near Stari Slankamen, Habsburg monarchy, c. 1635 – Vienna, Habsburg Monarchy, 20 July 1708) was elected to the rank of Metropolitan of Krušedol (Karlovci) in 1708. Isaija is best remembered as the first Serbian metropolite under Habsburg monarchy and for his diplomatic skills when he obtained the amendments in the Privileges. He was succeeded by Sofronije Podgoričanin.

== Biography ==
Đaković was born in the village of Grabovac, near Stari Slankamen, located in today's Inđija municipality in the Syrmia District of Serbia. He graduated from elementary school, gymnasium and the Theological Seminary. He married his village sweetheart before being ordained in the priesthood. His wife died prematurely, and he gave up everything for Christ and accepted monasticism at the Krušedol Monastery.

Later on, as an educated monk who spoke perfect German, he was elevated to the rank of Bishop of Jenopolje (Ineu in modern Romania). In Belgrade, in 1690 Patriarch Arsenije III Čarnojević received a "Letter of Invitation" from Leopold I to come under his protection in return for the Serbs to stay on their land and give, "according to their circumstances, the necessary food, and other supplies to the Imperial armies on the battlefield." At the time the Austrian Habsburgs needed able-bodied fighting men to survive as an empire. The protracted and tedious Great Turkish War was beginning to exhaust much of their treasury and resources.

Unfortunately, the Imperial invitation arrived three months after it was written, raising the possibility of an exodus of the Serbian population from Old Serbia, now that the balance of power tipped to the Turkish side. With the invitation and the looming exodus, the People's Assembly convened in Belgrade that Summer of 1690 at the behest of Patriarch Arsenije III. After lengthy discussions, the people decided to accept the Emperor's offer of protection and Isaija Đaković was named chief negotiator in the upcoming Vienna talks.

Isaija's task was to make the necessary alterations to the initial invitation. Since the letter didn't address the current Serbian population living in Austria and Hungary from the time of the Middle Ages, therefore, how could the new wave of Serb settlers hope to plant their roots without guarantees? Of course, the Emperor's letter needed a supplementary text to address the issue for the sake of the future existence of the Serbs in the Empire. The Assembly's decision was to correct the document that became known as 'Privileges'. It was Isaija's job to make sure that "church autonomy and jurisdiction for the patriarch" was identical to the situation he had held under the Sultan before the war.

Patriarch Arsenije and his negotiator Bishop Đaković were well aware that Leopold had appropriated all the ancient Serbian lands north of the Sava and Danube rivers for his Empire with no church autonomy and jurisdiction for the patriarch. Bishop Isaija then went to Vienna and met with Đorđe Branković who was by then under civilian supervision and living in a poorhouse. Together Bishop Isaija and Count Branković drafted specific demands as supplements to the privileges for the upcoming Belgrade Assembly (18 June 1690) and on 21 August 1690, Patriarch Arsenije received from the Emperor 'Privileges' with a new text that he had requested in the name of his people. In the 'Privileges' Serbs were a recognized nation in the Habsburg Monarchy, giving them religious and political guarantees on the condition that they remain loyal to the crown and defend the empire. In 1912, two years before the Great War, the Serbian privileges were abolished).

The long negotiations included the submissions of the first draft of 'Privileges' to the Patriarchal representative (Isaija Đaković) who noted that some essential changes had to be made primarily in part concerning the jurisdiction of the Orthodox Church over the Serbs who lived in territories now occupied by Hungary and those who lived in Croatia. This change in the 'Privileges' was always thought to be the greatest diplomatic victory of Isaija Đaković over the Imperial Habsburg court.

Through a proclamation of Leopold I, Holy Roman Emperor, on 21 August 1691, Grgeteg Monastery was given to Isaija Đaković, along with the village of Neradin and the barren lands of Brankovci.

In January 1708, the National Church Council in Krušedol elected bishop Isaija Đaković as the first archbishop of Krušedol and metropolitan of Eastern Orthodox Serbs in the Habsburg Monarchy.

Metropolitan Isaija was confirmed by Emperor Joseph I, but he died suddenly in July 1708, in Vienna, and was transferred and buried in the Krušedol monastery. Bishop Stevan Metohijac of the Eparchy of Bačka took over the mundane responsibilities of the Metropolitan until the Synod convened to elect Metropolitan Sofronije Podgoričanin as Isaija's successor in 1710.

== See also ==
- Metropolitanate of Karlovci

== Sources ==
- Bataković, Dušan T., ed. (2005). Histoire du peuple serbe [History of the Serbian People] (in French). Lausanne: L’Age d’Homme. ISBN 978-2-8251-1958-7.
- Ćirković, Sima (2004). The Serbs. Malden: Blackwell Publishing. ISBN 978-1-4051-4291-5.
- Đorđević, Miloš Z. (2010). "A Background to Serbian Culture and Education in the First Half of the 18th Century according to Serbian Historiographical Sources". Empires and Peninsulas: Southeastern Europe between Karlowitz and the Peace of Adrianople, 1699–1829. Berlin: LIT Verlag. pp. 125–131. ISBN 978-3-643-10611-7.
- Matić, Vojislav (2007). The Monastery of Krušedol. Novi Sad: Platoneum. ISBN 978-86-85869-18-1.
- Radić, Radmila (2007). "Serbian Christianity". The Blackwell Companion to Eastern Christianity. Malden, MA: Blackwell Publishing. pp. 231–248. ISBN 978-0-470-76639-2.
- Todorović, Jelena (2006). An Orthodox Festival Book in the Habsburg Empire: Zaharija Orfelin's Festive Greeting to Mojsej Putnik (1757). Aldershot: Ashgate Publishing. ISBN 978-0-7546-5611-1.

Eastern Orthodox Church titles
Preceded by First	Metropolitan of Krušedol; January–July 1708	Succeeded by Sofronije Podgoričanin
Preceded by Arsenije III Čarnojević	Serbian Metropolitan in Habsburg monarchy January–July 1708	Succeeded by Sofronije Podgoričanin
