= Vikentije Jovanović =

Serbian Metropolitan

Metropolitan of Belgrade and Karlovci Vikentije II
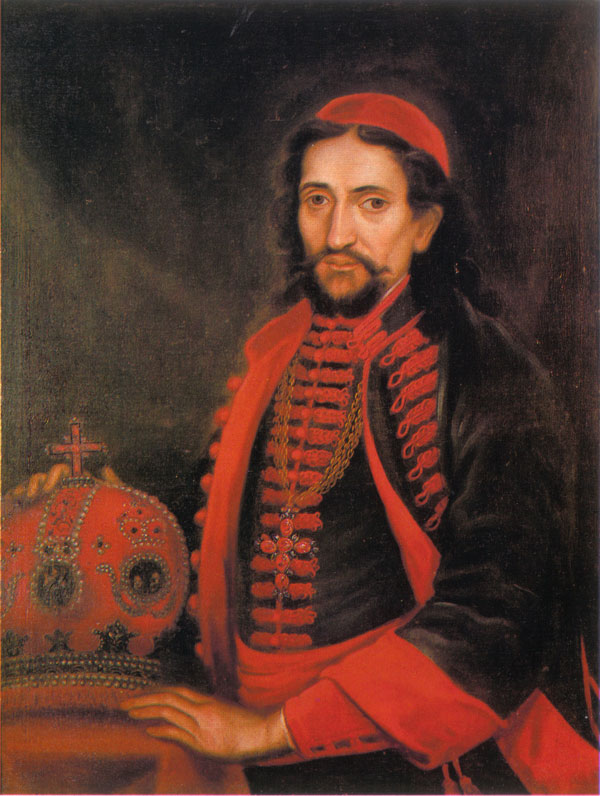
- Oil painting.
- Church: Serbian Orthodox Church
- Province: Military Frontier, Austrian Empire
- Metropolis: Sremski Karlovci
- Installed: 1731
- Term ended: 1737
- Predecessor: Mojsije Petrović
- Successor: Arsenije IV

Personal details
- Born: 1689 Szentendre, Ottoman Hungary (modern Hungary)
- Died: 6 June 1737 (aged 47-48) Belgrade, Kingdom of Serbia, Habsburg monarchy (modern Serbia)
- Denomination: Eastern Orthodox

Vikentije Jovanović (Serbian Cyrillic: Викентије Јовановић; 1689 – 6 June 1737) was the Serbian Orthodox Metropolitan of Belgrade and Karlovci from 1731 to 1737, as Vikentije II. During his diplomatic mission in Vienna in 1734, he was given permission by Emperor Charles VI to establish a hussar regiment constituted solely of Serbs and Croats. It was officially named Illyrian-Rascian regiment and inaugurated on 16 June 1735 in a grand ceremony officiated by Vikentije. The ceremony took place outside Budim where the banners which were used symbolized his importance in the Austrian Empire, but also the dual symbolism of East and West; dual coats of arms on their spears, two languages in their inscriptions (Church Slavonic and Latin), and the use of Eastern iconography and Western emblematic imagery. Vikentije's hussars went on to fight in the Austro-Russian–Turkish War (1735–1739).

== Annotations ==
1. His name is also spelt as Vićentije (Serbian Cyrillic: Вићентије Јовановић).

== See also ==
- Metropolitanate of Karlovci
- List of heads of the Serbian Orthodox Church

== Sources ==
- Вуковић, Сава (1996). Српски јерарси од деветог до двадесетог века (Serbian Hierarchs from the 9th to the 20th Century). Београд: Евро.

Eastern Orthodox Church titles
| Preceded by Mojsije | Metropolitan of Belgrade and Karlovci; 1732–1737 | Succeeded by Arsenije IV |
