= Krušedol Monastery =

Monastery in Serbia

Krušedol Monastery Манастир Крушедол
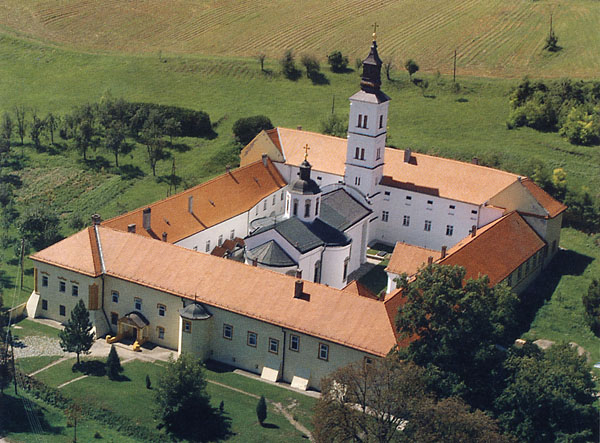
- Krušedol Monastery
- Interactive map of Krušedol Monastery; Манастир Крушедол

Monastery information
- Order: Serbian Orthodox
- Established: 1509-1514
- Dedication: Annunciation to the Theotokos

People
- Founders: Metropolitan Maksim Branković and Saint Angelina of Serbia

Site
- Location: Krušedol Prnjavor, Serbia
- Coordinates: 45°07′09″N 19°56′24″E

The Krušedol Monastery (Serbian Cyrillic: Манастир Крушедол, romanized: Manastir Krušedol, pronounced [kruʃɛ̌dɔl]) is a Serbian Orthodox monastery on the Fruška Gora mountain in the Syrmia region, northern Serbia, in the province of Vojvodina. The monastery is the legacy of the last Serbian despot family of Syrmia - Branković. Dedicated to the Annunciation to the Theotokos, it has been described as the "spiritual beacon" of Fruška Gora and "Second Studenica".

== History ==
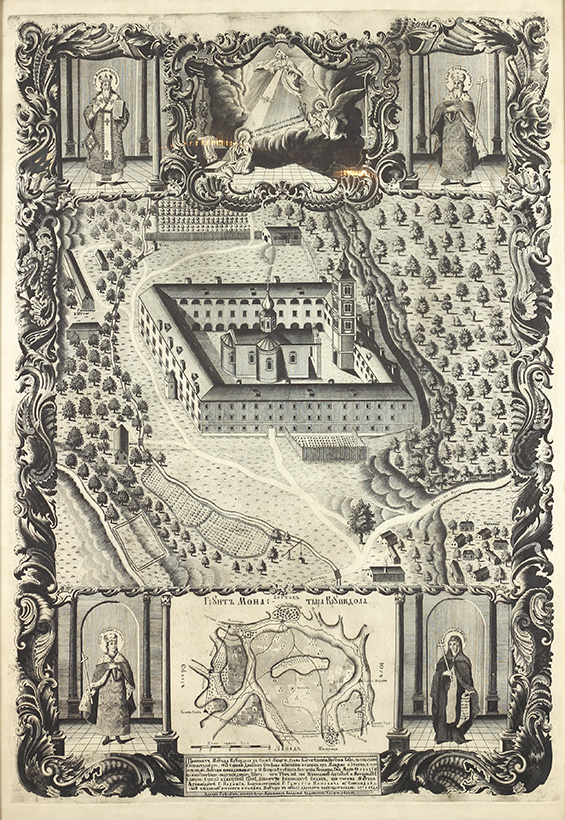
Krušedol lithography made by Zaharije Orfelin in 1775.

It was founded between 1509 and 1514 by Saint Maksim Branković, Metropolitan of Belgrade and Srem, and his mother Saint Angelina of Serbia. Original idea to be turned into the mausoleum of the Branković family. Initially, the monastery enjoyed the financial support of Neagoe Basarab (who was married to Serbian princess Milica Despina of Wallachia), and Grand Prince Vasili III of Russia. In 1708, it became the seat of the Metropolitanate of Krušedol.

In 1670, it had the largest brotherhood of all monasteries on Fruška Gora: 90 monks and 12 elders. In 1690, during the Great Serbian Migration, the monks fled the monastery and moved to Szentendre taking valuables, relics and artifacts with them. They returned to Krušedol in 1697. When the Ottomans were retreating in front of Prince Eugene of Savoy during the Austro-Turkish War of 1716-1718, they ransacked the monastery and burned it, but it was rebuilt later.

During World War II, the monastery wasn't burned, but was looted and damaged, nevertheless.

== Architecture ==
The church was originally built in the Morava architectural school style. However, after the 18th century reconstruction, seven church windows were reworked in the Baroque style. Above one of the windows on the east side, there is a sundial. It tells time from 6:00 to 17:00. The monastery has its own flower garden, loans and a park. It is gated, and the entry park gate is made in the shape of the church.

Today's icons and paintings have been symbolically adapted from the original, Medieval period, to the Baroque era. The iconostasis contains icons from different periods, from the 16th century to the 19th century. The original frescoes of the interior were painted in 1545, but they were overpainted in oil technique between 1745 and 1757. The 18th-century paintings are the works by Jov Vasiljevich and Stefan Tenecki.

The rich monastery vault has been looted several times. Part of the artifacts was returned later. The valuable either belongs originally to the Branković family, or to the other Serbian noble families. There is also a voluminous library. Old church books were brought by the hegumen Amfilohije from Russia in 1651. In 1662, the "Service and akathist to the Saints" was written in Krušedol, so as a rich annals.

== Burial sites ==
The whole Branković family, as well as two patriarchs of the Serbian Orthodox Church, are buried in Krušedol. The Patriarchs buried in the monastery are Arsenije III Čarnojević and Arsenije IV Jovanović Šakabenta. Graves of other historical figures include Princess Ljubica Obrenović, the wife of the Serbian Prince Miloš Obrenović, Serbian king Milan Obrenović, count Đorđe Branković (no connection to the Branković family), voivode Stevan Šupljikac, metropolitans and bishops Isaija Đaković, Vikentije Popović-Hadžilavić and Nikanor Melentijević.

== Importance ==
It has been described that "what Studenica was for the Medieval Serbia, Krušedol Monastery was for the Serbs in Podunavlje". Many artifacts from the monastery vault are today kept in the Museum of the Serbian Orthodox Church.

Because of the large library, many scholars used to visit and stay in the monastery, including the poet Laza Kostić. Author Dejan Medaković wrote about Krušedol, especially of the paintings.

Krušedol Monastery was declared a Monument of Culture of Exceptional Importance in 1990 and it is protected by the state.

The monastery is depicted on the 5 Dinar coin.

The monastery is a recipient of the Order of St. Sava 1st grade and held a status of Imperial lavra.

== Gallery ==
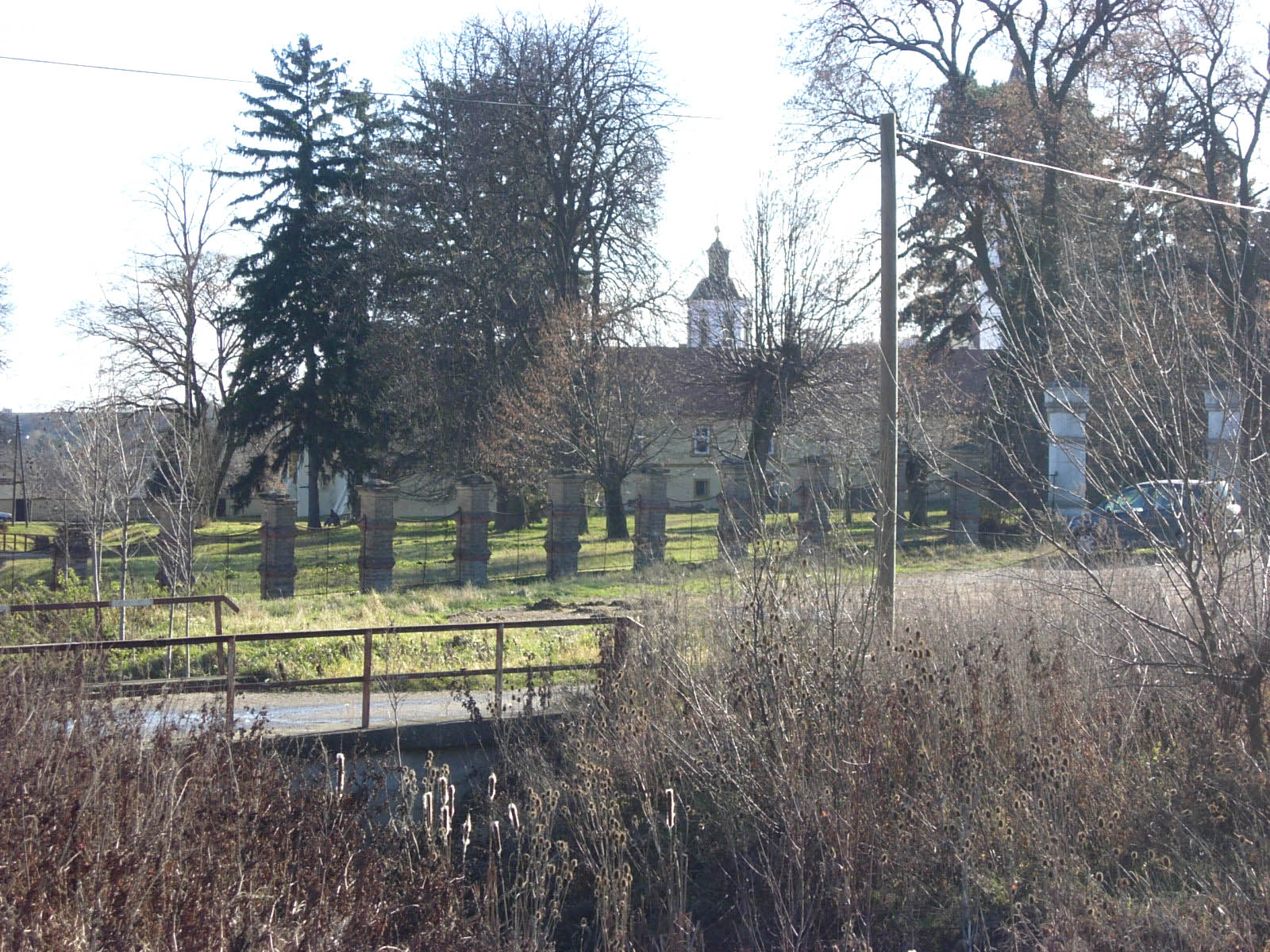
Monastery setting

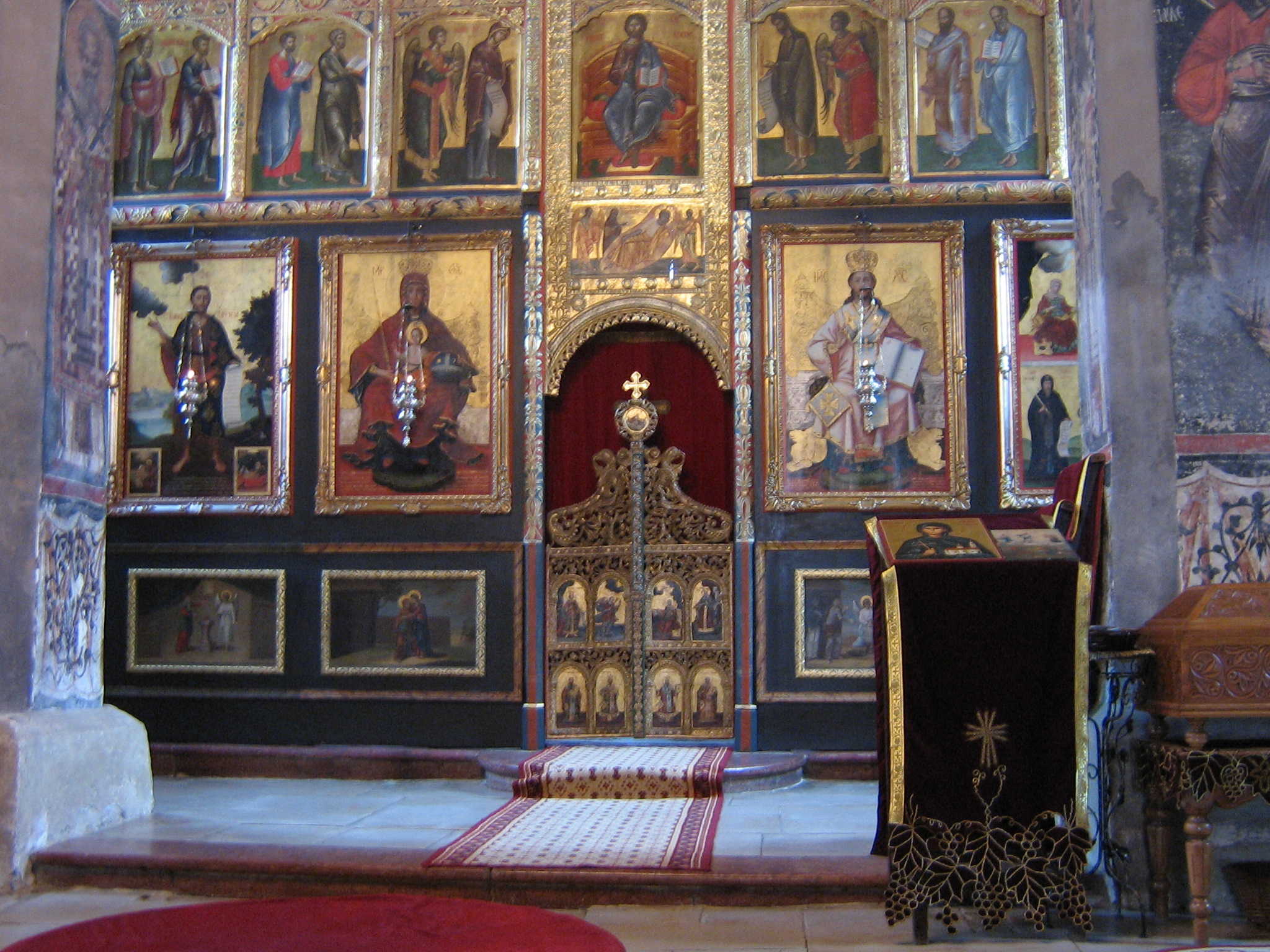
Monastery interior

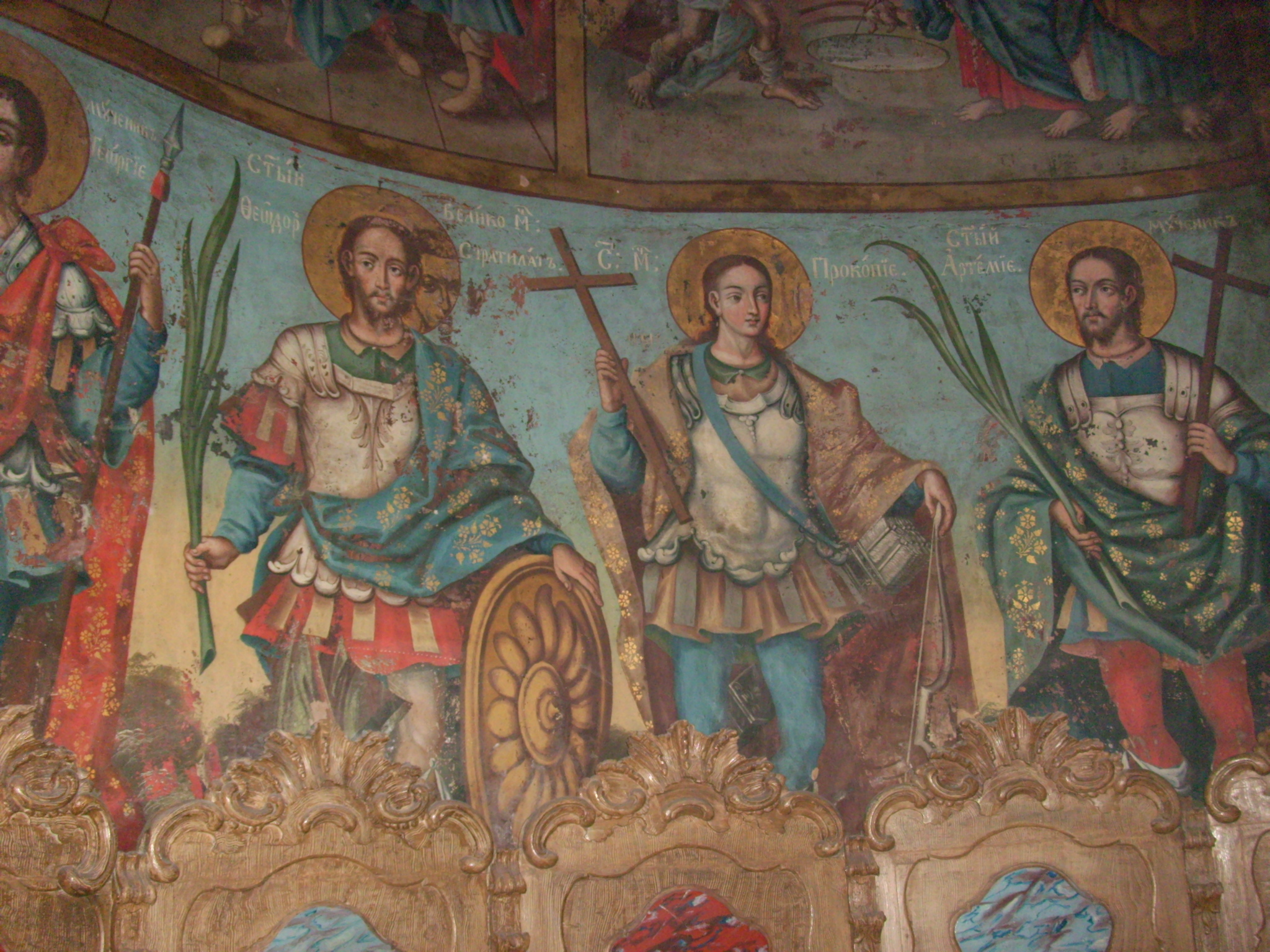
Interior mural

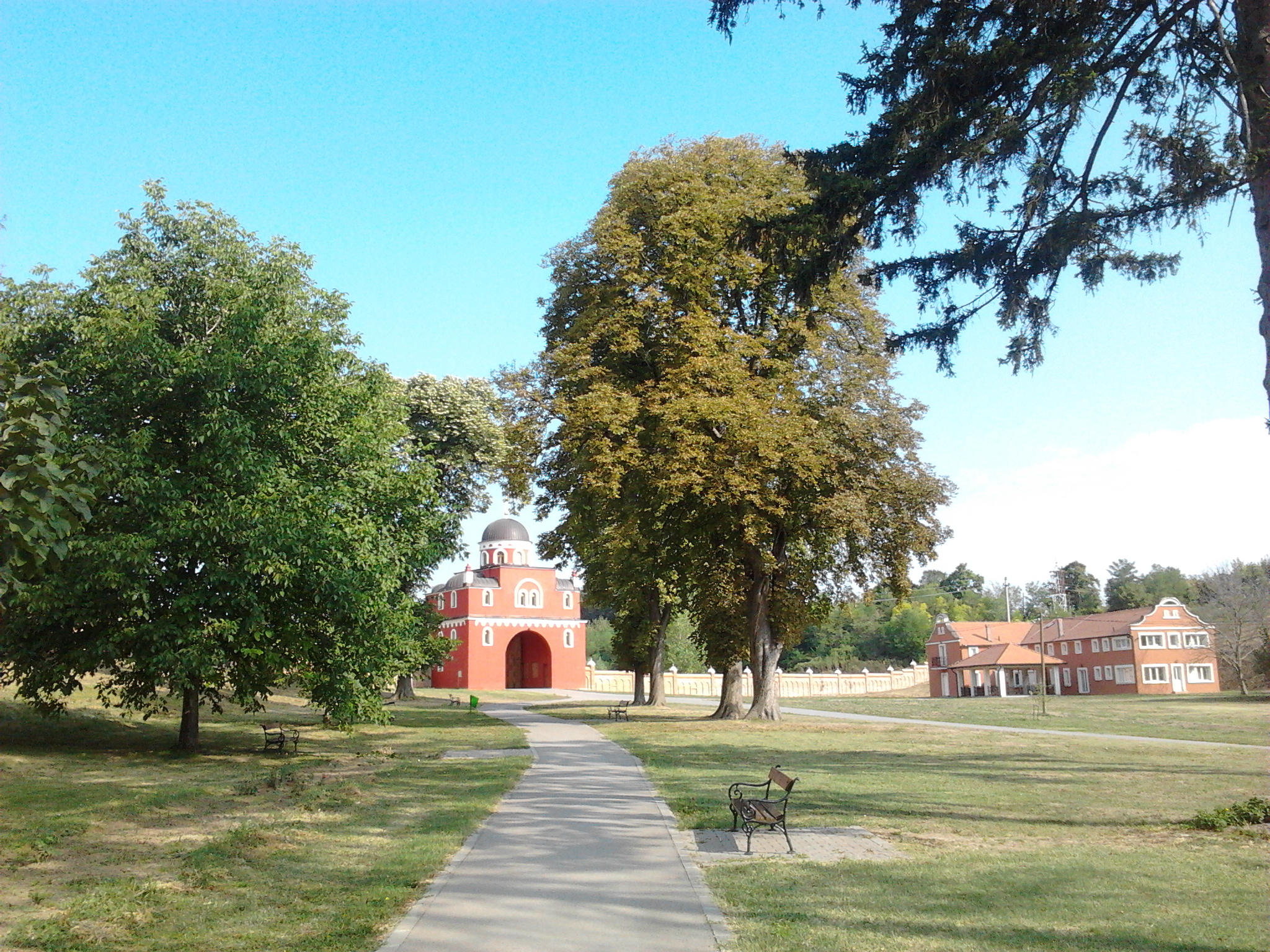
Gardens around monastery

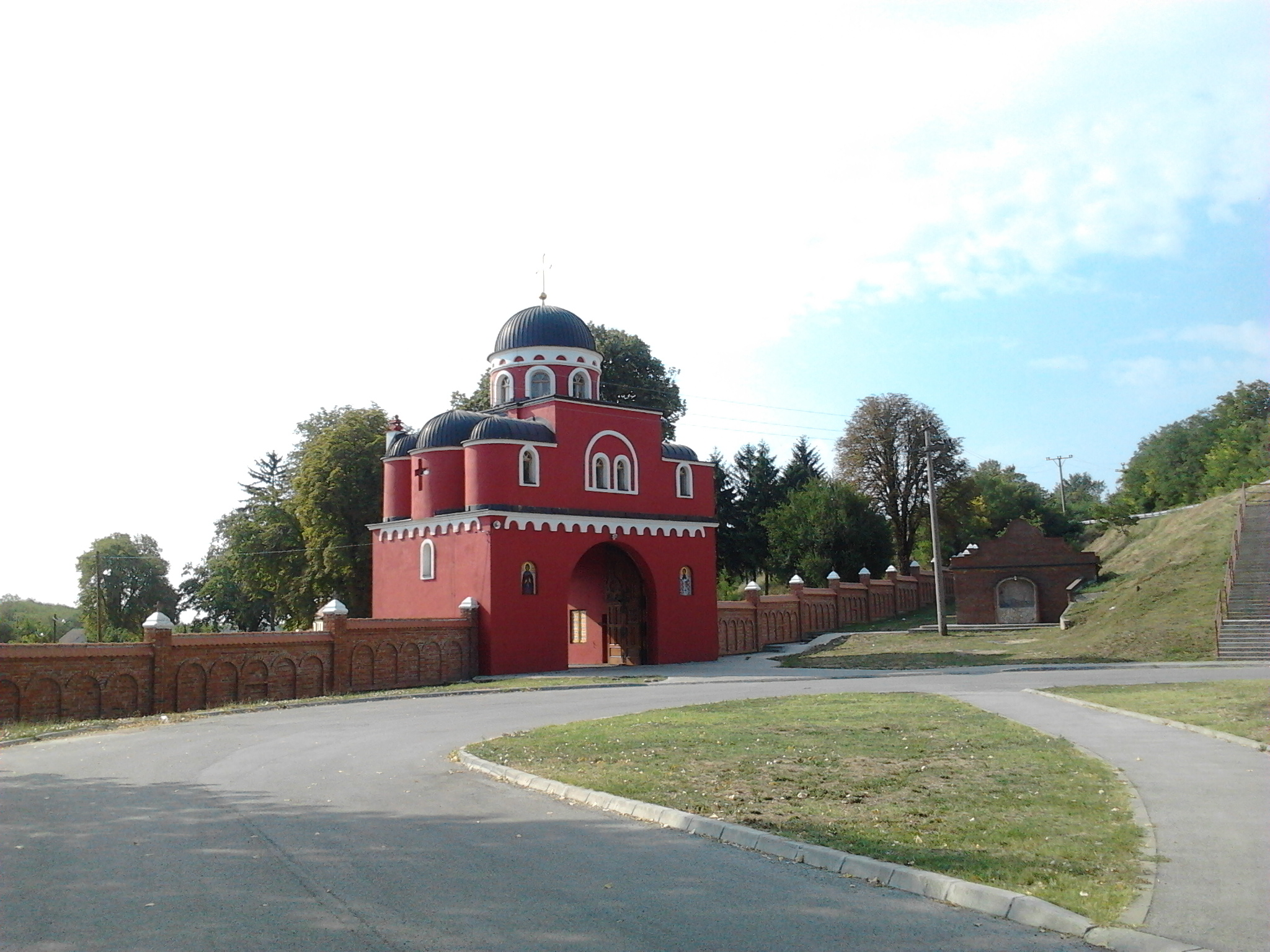
Entrance to monastery

== See also ==
- List of Serbian Orthodox monasteries
