= Metropolitanate of Karlovci =

Former metropolitanate of the Eastern Orthodox Church

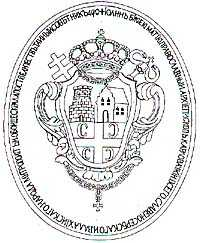
- Coat of arms of the Metropolitanate of Karlovci

Location
- Territory: Habsburg monarchy
- Headquarters: Karlovci, Habsburg monarchy (modern-day Sremski Karlovci, Serbia)

Information
- Denomination: Eastern Orthodox
- Sui iuris church: Self-governing Eastern Orthodox metropolitanate
- Established: 1708
- Dissolved: 1848
- Language: Church Slavonic, Slavonic-Serbian

The Metropolitanate of Karlovci (Serbian: Карловачка митрополија, romanized: Karlovačka mitropolija) was a metropolitanate of the Eastern Orthodox Church that existed in the Habsburg monarchy between 1708 and 1848. Between 1708 and 1713, it was known as the Metropolitanate of Krušedol, and between 1713 and 1848, as the Metropolitanate of Karlovci. In 1848, it was elevated to the Patriarchate of Karlovci, which existed until 1920, when it was merged with the Metropolitanate of Belgrade and other Eastern Orthodox jurisdictions in the newly established Kingdom of Serbs, Croats, and Slovenes to form the unified Serbian Orthodox Church.

== History ==
During the 16th and 17th centuries, all of the southern and central parts of the former medieval Kingdom of Hungary were under Turkish rule and organized as Ottoman Hungary. Since 1557, Serbian Orthodox Church in those regions was under jurisdiction of the Serbian Patriarchate of Peć. During the Great Turkish War, much of the central and southern Hungary was liberated and Serbian Orthodox eparchies in those regions fell under the Habsburg rule. In 1689, Serbian Patriarch Arsenije III Crnojević sided with Austrians and moved from Peć to Belgrade in 1690, leading the Great Migration of the Serbs. At that time, a large number of Serbs migrated to southern and central parts of Hungary.

Important privileges were given to them by Emperor Leopold I in three imperial chapters (Diploma Leopoldinum) the first issued in 1690, the second a year later, in 1691, and the third in 1695. Privileges allowed Serbs to keep their Eastern Orthodox faith and church organization headed by archbishop and bishops. In next two centuries of its autonomous existence, autonomous Serbian Church in Habsburg monarchy was organized on the basis of privileges originally received from the emperor. As the Serb settlers were granted religious freedom and ecclestical autonomy without separate diet, the Metropolitanate of Karlovci developed not only into religious but also quasi-political institution with its assembly effectively functioning as a Serb estates diet.

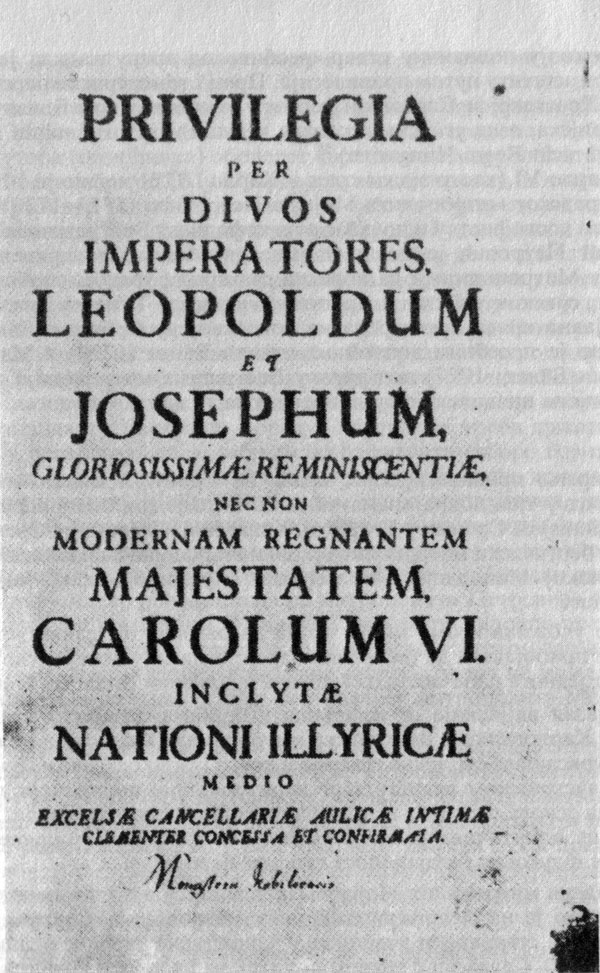
Collection of Imperial Privileges, granted to Eastern Orthodox Serbs by Charles VI in 1732

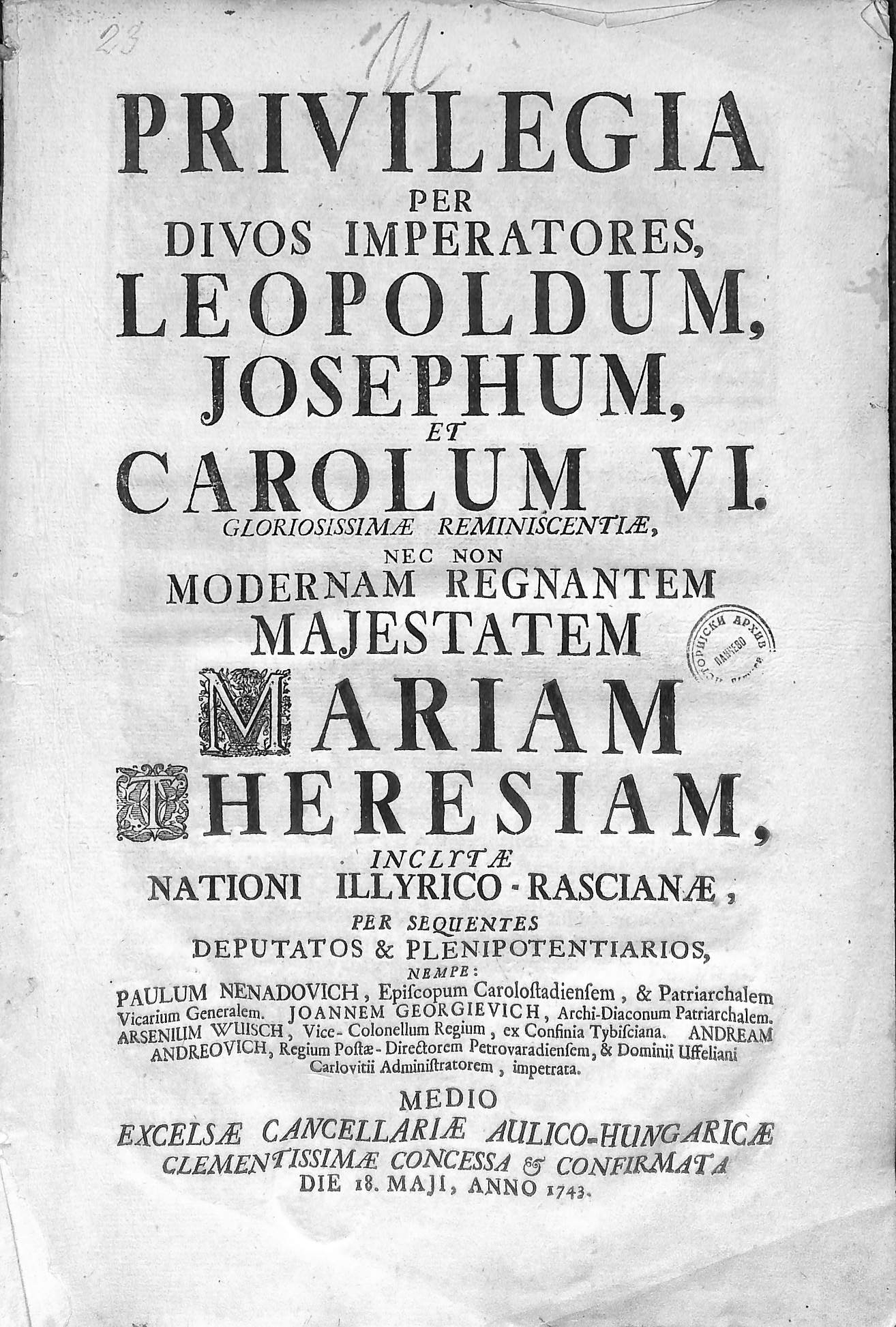
Confirmation of Serbian Privileges, issued by Maria Theresa in 1743

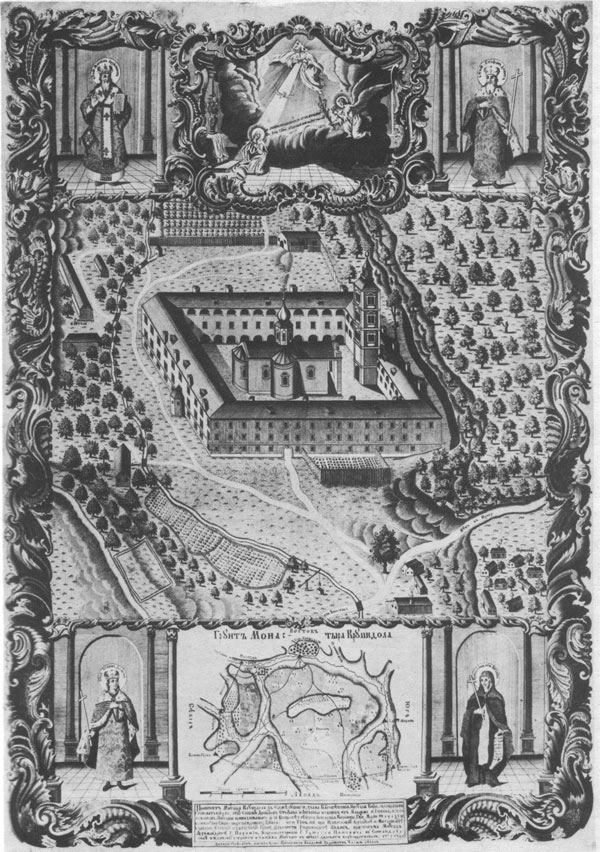
1775 graphics of the Krušedol Monastery, first seat of the Metropolitanate

Saint Nicholas Cathedral in Sremski Karlovci, cathedral church of the Metropolitanate

Until death in 1706, head of the church was Patriarch Arsenije III who reorganized eparchies and appointed new bishops. He held the title of Serbian Patriarch until the end of his life. New emperor Joseph I (1705–1711), following the advice of Cardinal Leopold Karl von Kollonitsch abolished that title, and substitute it with less distinguished title of archbishop or metropolitan. In his decree, Emperor Joseph I stated, "we must make sure that they never elect another Patriarch since it is against the Catholic Church and the doctrine of the Fathers of the Church". According to that, future primates of the Serbian Orthodox Church in the new Kingdom of Serbia of the Habsburg Monarchy will bare the title of archbishop and metropolitan. The only exception from the Imperial decree was the case of later Serbian Patriarch Arsenije IV Jovanović Šakabenta (1725–1748) who brought his title directly from the historic see of Peć (1737).

After the death of Patriarch Arsenije III (1706), the Serbian Church Council was held at the Krušedol Monastery in 1708 and proclaimed Krušedol to be the see of the newly elected archbishop and metropolitan Isaija Đaković. The Krušedol Monastery was bequest of the late medieval Serbian Branković dynasty in the beginning of the 16th century, which was the main historical and national reason for the Serbs to choose this monastery as their eclessiastical seat.

Between 1708 and 1713, the seat of the metropolitanate was at the Krušedol Monastery, and in 1713 it was moved to Karlovci (modern-day Sremski Karlovci, Serbia). The new archbishop Vićentije Popović (1713–1725) moved all administration from Krušedol to Karlovci. So, the new seat of the Serbian Church in Habsburg Monarchy became Sremski Karlovci which was confirmed by the seal of imperial approval in the charter of Emperor Charles VI issued in 1713.

During the Austro-Turkish War (1716–1718), regions of Lower Syrmia, Banat, central Serbia with Belgrade, and Oltenia were liberated from Ottoman rule, and under the Treaty of Passarowitz (1718) became part of the Habsburg Monarchy. Political change was followed by ecclesiastical reorganization. Eparchies in newly liberated regions were not subjected to the Metropolitan of Karlovci, mainly because Habsburg authorities did not want to allow the establishment of unified and centralized administrative structure of the Eastern Orthodox Church in the Monarchy. Instead, they supported the establishment of a separate metropolitanate for Eastern Orthodox Serbs and Romanians in liberated regions, centered in Belgrade. The newly created Metropolitanate of Belgrade was headed by metropolitan Mojsije Petrović. Metropolitanate of Belgrade had jurisdiction over Kingdom of Serbia and Banat, as well as Oltenia.

The establishment of new metropolitan province was approved by Serbian Patriarch Mojsije I (1712–1725). Shortly after, in 1726, two metropolitanates merged and by the imperial decree of Charles VI, the administrative capital of Serbian Church was moved from Sremski Karlovci to Belgrade in 1731. Metropolitan Vikentije Jovanović (1731–1737) resided in Belgrade.

During the Austro-Turkish War (1737–1739), Serbian Patriarch Arsenije IV Jovanović Šakabenta (1725–1748) sided with the Habsburgs and in 1737 left Peć and came to Belgrade, taking over the administration of the metropolitanate. He received imperial confirmation, and when Belgrade fell to Ottomans in the autumn of 1739, he moved the church headquarters to Sremski Karlovci.

In 1748, patriarch Arsenije IV died, and church council was held for the election of a new primate of the Serbian Orthodox Church in the Habsburg Monarchy. After the short tenure of metropolitan Isaija Antonović (1748–1749), another church council was held, electing the new metropolitan Pavle Nenadović (1749–1768). During his tenure important administrative reforms were undertaken in the Metropolitanate of Karlovci. He also tried to help the patriarchal mother-church in Peć, under the Ottoman rule, but the old Serbian Patriarchate could not be saved. In 1766, the Serbian Patriarchate of Peć was finally abolished, and all of its eparchies that were under Turkish rule were overtaken by the Ecumenical Patriarchate of Constantinople. Serbian hierarchs of the Metropolitanate of Karlovci had no intention to submit themselves to the Greek Patriarch in Constantinople, and the Ecumenical Patriarchate also had enough wisdom not to demand their submission. From that time, Metropolitanate of Karlovci continued functioning as the fully independent ecclesiastical center of Eastern Orthodoxy in the Habsburg Monarchy, with seven suffragan bishops (Bačka, Vršac, Timisoara, Arad, Buda, Pakrac, and Gornji Karlovac).

After the creation of the Romanian Greek Catholic Church, the Transylvanian Romanians who refused to join the union with Rome came under the jurisdiction of the Metropolitanate of Karlovci. According to Andrei Mocioni, this led for the Metropolitan of Karlovci to also use the title Metropolitan of the Romanian Nation.

The position of Serbs and their church in Habsburg Monarchy was further regulated by reforms brought about by Dowager-Empress Maria Theresa, Queen of Hungary (1740–1780). The Serb Church Council of 1769 regulated various issues in a special act named "Regulament" and, later, in similar act called the Declaratory Rescript of the Illyrian Nation, published in 1779.

The death of Maria Theresa in 1780 marked the end the old imperial and royal House of Habsburg, highly respected among Orthodox Serbs, and succession passed to the new dynasty, called the House of Habsburg-Lorraine that ruled until 1918. Enlightened reforms of emperor Joseph II (1780–1790) affected all religious institutions in the Monarchy, including the Metropolitanate of Karlovci. One of such reforms, emposed by state authorities during the second half of the XVIII century, was the reduction of religious holydays.

Serbian metropolitans of Sremski Karlovci promoted the Enlightenment by introducing western education in the schools established in Sremski Karlovci (1733), and in Novi Sad (1737). In order to counter the Roman Catholic influence, the school curricula was exposed to cultural influence of the Russian Orthodox Church. As early as in 1724 the Holy Synod of Russian Orthodox Church sent M. Suvorov to open a school in Sremski Karlovci, which graduates were thereof passed on to Kievan seminary, and the more gifted to the Academy in Kiev. The Church liturgical language became Russian Slavonic, called the New Church Slavonic. On another hand, Baroque influence became visible in the church architecture, iconography, literature and theology.

During the eighteenth century the Metropolitanate maintained close connections with the Kiev Theological Academy and the Russian Orthodox Church. Several prominent East Slavic scholars, like Emanuel Kozačinski, were employed by the Karlovci Metropolitanate as educators already during the first half of the 18th century. In time, many Serbian theological students were educated in Kiev. A Seminary was open in 1794 which educated Orthodox priests during the nineteenth century for the needs of the Karlovci Metropolitanate and beyond.

By the end of the 18th century, the Metropolitanate of Karlovci included a large territory that stretched from the Adriatic Sea to Bukovina and from Danube and Sava to Upper Hungary. During the long tenure of highly conservative metropolitan Stefan Stratimirović (1790–1836), internal reforms were halted, resulting in the gradual formation of two fractions that would subsequently mark the life of Orthodox Serbs in the Metropolitanate, and later Patriarchate of Karlovci throughout the 19th century. First fraction was clerical and conservative. It was led by majority of bishops and higher clergy. Second fraction was oriented towards further reforms within the church administration, in order to allow more influence on decision making to lower clergy, laity and civil leaders. In the same time, aspirations towards Serbian national autonomy within the Empire gained great importance, leading to historical events of 1848–49.

== List of eparchies ==
Eparchy	Seat	Notes
Eparchy of Arad	Arad	
Eparchy of Bačka	Novi Sad	
Eparchy of Belgrade	Belgrade	1726–1739
Eparchy of Buda	Szentendre	
Eparchy of Gornji Karlovac	Karlovac	
Eparchy of Kostajnica	Kostajnica	1713–1771
Eparchy of Lepavina	Lepavina	1733–1750
Eparchy of Mohács	Mohács	until 1732
Eparchy of Pakrac	Pakrac	
Eparchy of Râmnicu	Râmnicu Vâlcea	1726–1739
Eparchy of Srem	Sremski Karlovci	
Eparchy of Timișoara	Timișoara	
Eparchy of Valjevo	Valjevo	1726–1739
Eparchy of Vršac	Vršac	
Eparchy of Transilvania	Sibiu	Spiritual jurisdiction only
Eparchy of Bukovina	Chernivtsi	Spiritual jurisdiction only
Eparchy of Dalmatia	Šibenik	Spiritual jurisdiction only

== List of metropolitans ==
No.	Primate	Portrait	Personal name	Reign	Title	Notes
1	Isaija I Исаија I Isaias I		Isaija Đaković; Исаија Ђаковић	1708	Metropolitan of Krušedol	
2	Sofronije; Софроније; Sophronius		Sofronije Podgoričanin; Софроније Подгоричанин	1710–1711	Metropolitan of Krušedol	
3	Vićentije I Вићентије I Vicentius I		Vićentije Popović; Вићентије Поповић	1713–1725	Metropolitan of Karlovci	
4	Mojsije I Мојсије I Moses I		Mojsije Petrović; Мојсије Петровић	1726–1730	Metropolitan of Belgrade and Karlovci	
5	Vikentije II; Викентије II; Vicentius II		Vikentije Jovanović; Викентије Јовановић	1731–1737	Metropolitan of Belgrade and Karlovci	
6	Arsenije IV; Арсеније IV; Arsenius IV		Arsenije IV Jovanović Šakabenta; Арсеније Јовановић Шакабента	1737–1748	Archbishop of Peć and Serbian Patriarch	Leader of the Second Serbian Migration
7	Isaija II; Исаија II; Isaias II		Isaija Antonović; Јован Антоновић	1748–1749	Metropolitan of Karlovci	
8	Pavle; Павле; Paul		Pavle Nenadović; Павле Ненадовић	1749–1768	Metropolitan of Karlovci	
9	Jovan; Јован; John		Jovan Georgijević; Јован Ђорђевић	1768–1773	Metropolitan of Karlovci	
10	Vikentije III; Вићентије III; Vicentius III		Vićentije Jovanović Vidak; Вићентије Јовановић Видак	1774–1780	Metropolitan of Karlovci	
11	Mojsije II; Мојсије II; Moses II		Mojsije Putnik; Мојсије Путник	1781–1790	Metropolitan of Karlovci	
12	Stefan I Стефан I Stephen I		Stefan Stratimirović; Стефан Стратимировић	1790–1836	Metropolitan of Karlovci	
13	Stefan II; Стефан II; Stephen II		Stefan Stanković; Стефан Станковић	1836–1841	Metropolitan of Karlovci	
14	Josif; Јосиф; Joseph		Josif Rajačić; Јосиф Рајачић	1842–1848	Metropolitan of Karlovci	Elevated to Patriarch at the May Assembly

== See also ==
- Patriarchate of Karlovci
- Serbian Patriarchate of Peć
- Serbian Orthodox Church

== Sources ==
- Bataković, Dušan T., ed. (2005). Histoire du peuple serbe [History of the Serbian People] (in French). Lausanne: L’Age d’Homme.
- Bocşan, Nicolae (2015). "Illyrian privileges and the Romanians from the Banat" (PDF). Banatica. 25: 243–258.
- Calic, Marie-Janine (2019). The Great Cauldron: A History of Southeastern Europe. Cambridge, MA: Harvard University Press.
- Ćirković, Sima (2004). The Serbs. Malden: Blackwell Publishing. ISBN 9781405142915.
- Dabić, Vojin S. (2011). "The Habsburg-Ottoman War of 1716-1718 and Demographic Changes in the War-Afflicted Territories". The Peace of Passarowitz, 1718. West Lafayette: Purdue University Press. pp. 191–208.
- Đorđević, Miloš Z. (2010). "A Background to Serbian Culture and Education in the First Half of the 18th Century according to Serbian Historiographical Sources". Empires and Peninsulas: Southeastern Europe between Karlowitz and the Peace of Adrianople, 1699–1829. Berlin: LIT Verlag. pp. 125–131. ISBN 9783643106117.
- Draganić, Ifigenija (2010). "Greek and Serbian in the Ottoman Empire and the Habsburg Monarchy in the 18th and at the Beginning of the 19th Centuries". Empires and Peninsulas: Southeastern Europe between Karlowitz and the Peace of Adrianople, 1699–1829. Berlin: LIT Verlag. pp. 257–265.
- Fotić, Aleksandar (2008). "Serbian Orthodox Church". Encyclopedia of the Ottoman Empire. New York: Infobase Publishing. pp. 519–520. ISBN 9781438110257.
- Gavrilović, Slavko (1993). "Serbs in Hungary, Slavonia and Croatia in struggles against the Turks (15th–18th centuries)". Serbs in European Civilization. Belgrade: Nova, Serbian Academy of Sciences and Arts, Institute for Balkan Studies. pp. 41–54.
- Gavrilović, Vladan (2023). "The Serbian Vojvodina: Idea and borders until 1918". Istraživanja: Journal of historical researches. 34: 112–120.
- Kiminas, Demetrius (2009). The Ecumenical Patriarchate: A History of Its Metropolitanates with Annotated Hierarch Catalogs. Wildside Press LLC.
- Kostić, Miroslava (2016). "Art and the renewal of the medieval political tradition in the Metropolitanate of Karlovci in the mid-18th century". Imagining the Past: The reception of the Middle Ages in the Serbian Art from the 18th to 21st Century. Belgrade: Serbian National Committee of Byzantine Studies. pp. 47–57.
- Martin, Joannes Baptista; Petit, Ludovicus, eds. (1907). "Serborum in Hungaria degentium synodi et constitutiones ecclesiasticae". Sacrorum conciliorum nova et amplissima collectio. Vol. 39. Parisiis: Huberti Welter, Bibliopolae. pp. 497–956.
- Ninković, Nenad (2024). "Marriage in the Metropolitanate of Karlovci in the late eighteenth century". Istraživanja: Journal of Historical Researches. 35: 128–143.
- Pavlovich, Paul (1989). The History of the Serbian Orthodox Church. Serbian Heritage Books.
- Pavlowitch, Stevan K. (2002). Serbia: The History behind the Name. London: Hurst & Company. ISBN 9781850654773.
- Popović, Radomir V. (2013). Serbian Orthodox Church in History. Belgrade: Academy of Serbian Orthodox Church for Fine Arts and Conservation.
- Puzović, Predrag (2004). "Pavle Nenadović (1699–1768)". 100 most eminent Serbs. Belgrade: Princip. pp. 108–114.
- Radić, Radmila (2007). "Serbian Christianity". The Blackwell Companion to Eastern Christianity. Malden, MA: Blackwell Publishing. pp. 231–248. ISBN 9780470766392.
- Radić, Radmila (2015). "The Serbian Orthodox Church in the First World War". The Serbs and the First World War 1914-1918. Belgrade: Serbian Academy of Sciences and Arts. pp. 263–285.
- Schwicker, Johann Heinrich (1881). "Die Vereinigung der serbischen Metropolien von Belgrad und Carlowitz im Jahre 1731". Archiv für österreichische Geschichte. 62: 305–450.
- Šuletić, Nebojša (2021). "Usurpations of and Designated Successions to the Throne in the Serbian Patriarchate: The Case of Patriarch Moses Rajović (1712-24)" (PDF). Balcanica. 52: 47–67. Archived from the original (PDF) on 2022-02-17.
- Точанац, Исидора Б. (2007). "Београдска и Карловачка митрополија: Процес уједињења (1722-1731)" (PDF). Историјски часопис. 55: 201–217. Archived from the original on 2018-03-24.
- Точанац, Исидора Б. (2008). Српски народно-црквени сабори (1718-1735). Београд: Историјски институт САНУ. ISBN 9788677430689.
- Точанац-Радовић, Исидора Б. (2014). Реформа Српске православне цркве у Хабзбуршкој монархији за време владавине Марије Терезије и Јосифа II (1740-1790). Београд: Филозофски факултет.
- Точанац-Радовић, Исидора Б. (2014). "Настанак и развој институције Српског народно-црквеног сабора у Карловачкој митрополији у 18. веку (The appearance and the development of the institution of Serbian national-clerical council in the Metropolitanate of Karlovci in 18th century)" ( (PDF)). Три века Карловачке митрополије 1713-2013. Сремски Карловци-Нови Сад: Епархија сремска, Филозофски факултет. pp. 127–144. Archived from the original on 2021-04-09.
- Točanac-Radović, Isidora (2018). "Belgrade - Seat of the Archbishopric and Metropolitanate (1718-1739)". Belgrade 1521-1867. Belgrade: The Institute of History. pp. 155–167.
- Točanac-Radović, Isidora (2020). "The Influence of the Centre on the Provinces in the 18th Century: The Abolition of the Orthodox Holidays in the Habsburg Monarchy". The Habsburg State-wide and the regions in the Southern Danube basin (16th-20th centuries). Wien: New Academic Press. pp. 83–98.
- Točanac-Radović, Isidora (2022). "The Great Migration of Serbs and the Question of the Serbian Ethnic and Religious Community in the Habsburg Monarchy". Migrations in the Slavic Cultural Space: From the Middle Ages to the Present Day. Łódź: Łódź University Press. pp. 15–27.
- Todorović, Jelena (2006). An Orthodox Festival Book in the Habsburg Empire: Zaharija Orfelin's Festive Greeting to Mojsej Putnik (1757). Aldershot: Ashgate Publishing. ISBN 9780754656111.
