= Arsenije IV Jovanović Šakabenta =

Serbian Patriarch

Arsenije IV
- Archbishop of Peć and Serbian Patriarch
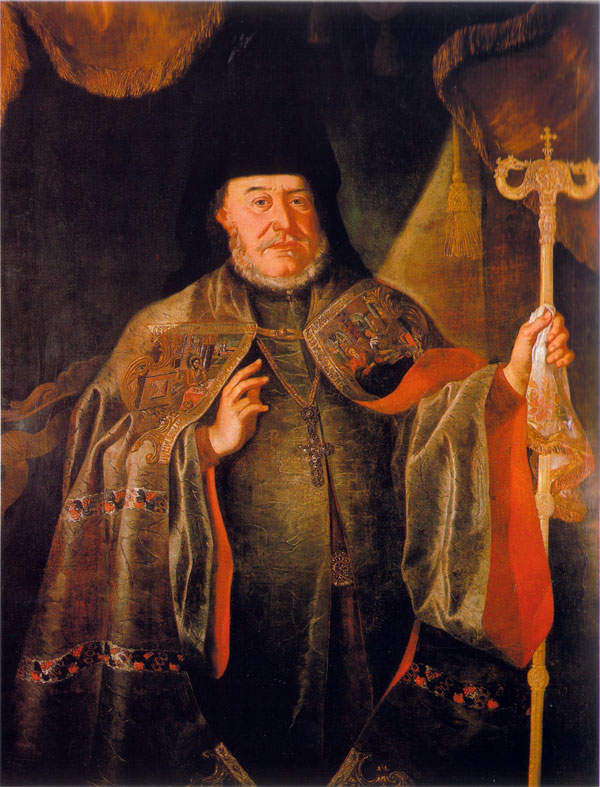
- Church: Serbian Patriarchate of Peć
- See: Patriarchate of Peć Monastery
- Installed: 1724
- Term ended: 1748
- Predecessor: Mojsije I
- Successor: Joanikije III

Personal details
- Born: 1698 Peć, Ottoman Empire (modern-day Kosovo)
- Died: 18 January 1748 (aged 50) Sremski Karlovci, Habsburg monarchy (modern-day Serbia)

Arsenije IV Jovanović Šakabenta (Serbian Cyrillic: Арсеније IV Јовановић Шакабента, Serbian pronunciation: [ǎrseːnije t͡ʃětʋr̩ːtiː]; 1698 – 18 January 1748) was the Patriarch of the Serbian Patriarchate of Peć from 1724 to 1737 and head of the Serbian Church in Habsburg Monarchy from 1737 to his death in 1748.

He opened the first official Academy of Painting on the territory of the Metropolitanate of Karlovci after the artistic and cultural reforms were commenced under the auspices and blessing of Vikentije Jovanović, his predecessor. He commissioned the Slavic heraldic bearings called Stemmatographia. He was succeeded by patriarch Joannicius III.

== Life ==
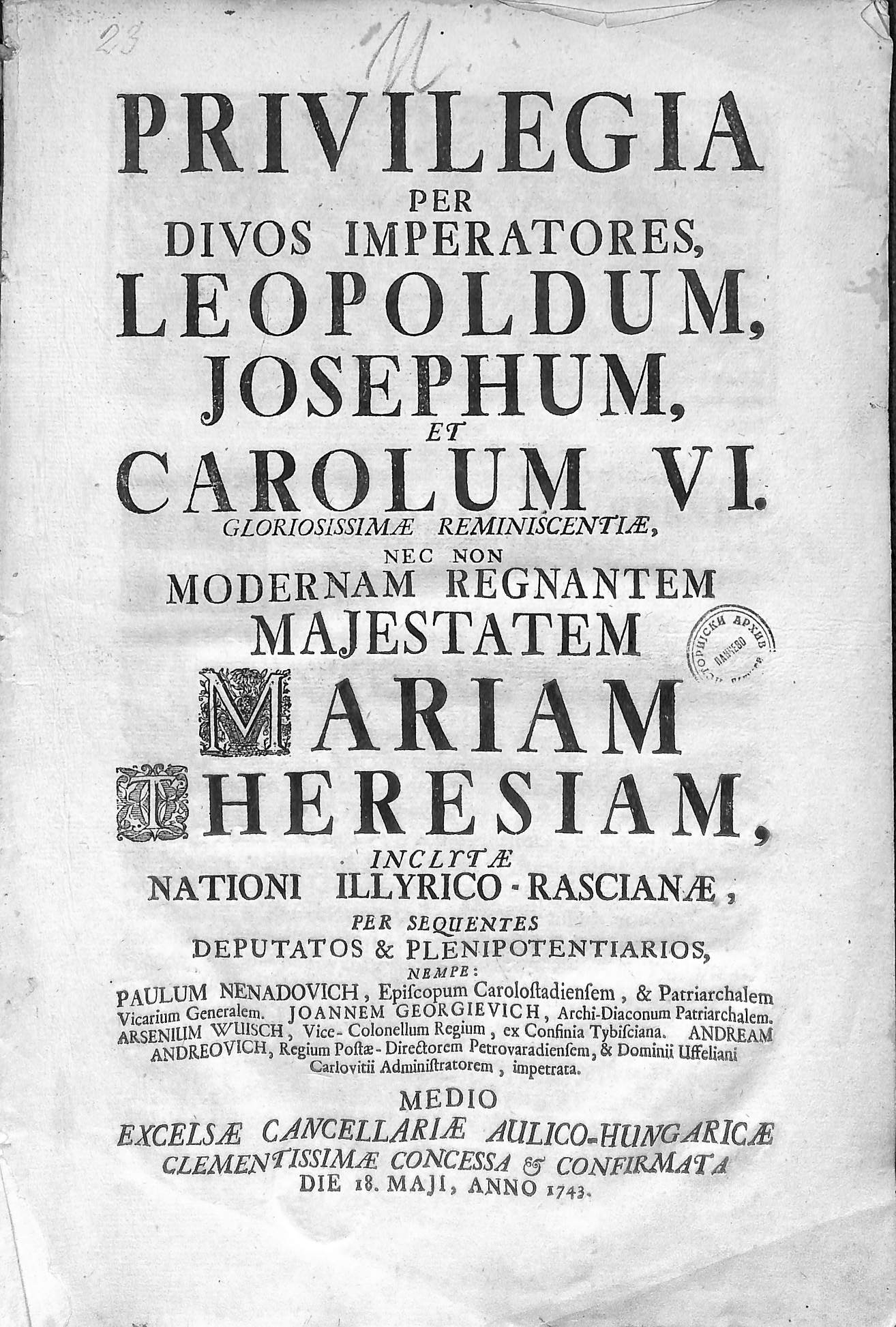
Confirmation of Serbian Privileges, issued by Maria Theresa in 1743

In 1724, the ailing Serbian patriarch Mojsije I (d. 1730) decided to step down from the patriarchal throne, and was succeeded by Arsenije, the metropolitan of Raška, who became the new Serbian patriarch as Arsenije IV, with seat in Peć.

In 1737, during the Habsburg-Ottoman War patriarch Arsenije IV moved from Peć to Belgrade, and remained there until 1739. With the Treaty of Belgrade (1739) which ended the war, the Habsburg-held Kingdom of Serbia ceased to exist. The Ottoman sultan deposed the pro-Habsburg patriarch Arsenije IV and in his place appointed Joanikije III, who was a Greek.

Patriarch Arsenije IV thus remained in the Habsburg monarchy along with many Serbs, who accompanied him during the Second Serbian Migration. Arsenije IV became Metropolitan of Karlovci, maintaining however deep connections with the Serbs who remained in the Ottoman Empire, now under the jurisdiction of Joannicius III, who remained Patriarch of Peć until 1746, when, burdened with debts due to his high-living, he was forced to sell the title to pay his creditors.

Šakabenta’s 1737 Memorandum, drafted during negotiations in Vienna with Habsburg authorities, set out a political program aimed at securing broad rights for the Serbian nation within the Habsburg Monarchy in return for continued military support against the Ottomans. Invoking earlier privileges granted by Leopold I and Joseph I, Arsenije demanded confirmation of Serbian religious freedom and full autonomy of the Serbian Orthodox Church, with his spiritual jurisdiction extending over Serbia and other Balkan provinces. He proposed autonomous governance for Serbian territories claimed during the war, rejecting their treatment as newly conquered lands, and called for a separate Supreme Royal Tribunal composed exclusively of Serbs, alongside a Serbian chamber in Vienna. The Memorandum outlined autonomy in taxation, to be administered by Serbian officials, and in military affairs, including the creation of Serbian regiments under Serbian officers. While allowing the presence of German garrisons, it insisted they not interfere in Serbian civil affairs.

In 1743, responding to the petition of patriarch Arsenije IV and his bishops in the Habsburg monarchy, queen Maria Theresa confirmed and continued to uphold old privileges granted to her Serbian subjects by previous Habsburg monarchs, emperors Leopold I, Joseph I and Charles VI.

== Title ==
Arsenije signed himself "Arsenije, By the Grace of God, Archbishop of Peć and Patriarch of all Serbs and Bulgarians and all of Illyria". Another style was "Archbishop of All Serbs, Bulgarians, Western Pomorje, Dalmatia, Bosnia, both halves of Danube and all of Illyria".

== See also ==
- List of heads of the Serbian Orthodox Church

Eastern Orthodox Church titles
Preceded by Mojsije I	Serbian Patriarch; 1724–1737 (1748)	Succeeded by Joanikije III
Preceded by Vikentije Jovanović	Metropolitan of Karlovci; 1737–1748	Succeeded by Isaija Antonović

== Sources ==
- Ćirković, Sima (2004). The Serbs. Malden: Blackwell Publishing.
- Gavrilović, Slavko (1993). "Serbs in Hungary, Slavonia and Croatia in struggles against the Turks (15th–18th centuries)". Serbs in European Civilization. Belgrade: Nova, Serbian Academy of Sciences and Arts, Institute for Balkan Studies. pp. 41–54.
- Gavrilović, Vladan (2020). "Migrations of Serbian people to the Province of Srem during Austro-Turkish War 1737-1739". The Habsburg State-wide and the regions in the Southern Danube basin (16th-20th centuries). Wien: New Academic Press. pp. 45–55.
- Šuletić, Nebojša (2017). "Under Ottoman Rule: Until the End of the 18th Century" (PDF). Artistic Heritage of the Serbian People in Kosovo and Metohija: History, Identity, Vulnerability, Protection. Belgrade: Serbian Academy of Sciences and Arts. pp. 31–39.
- Šuletić, Nebojša (2021). "Usurpations of and Designated Successions to the Throne in the Serbian Patriarchate: The Case of Patriarch Moses Rajović (1712-24)" (PDF). Balcanica. 52: 47–67.
- Točanac-Radović, Isidora (2018). "Belgrade - Seat of the Archbishopric and Metropolitanate (1718–1739)". Belgrade 1521-1867. Belgrade: The Institute of History. pp. 155–167.
- Todorović, Jelena (2006). An Orthodox Festival Book in the Habsburg Empire: Zaharija Orfelin's Festive Greeting to Mojsej Putnik (1757). Aldershot: Ashgate Publishing.
