= Arsenije III Crnojević =

Serbian Patriarch

- Archbishop of Peć and Serbian Patriarch
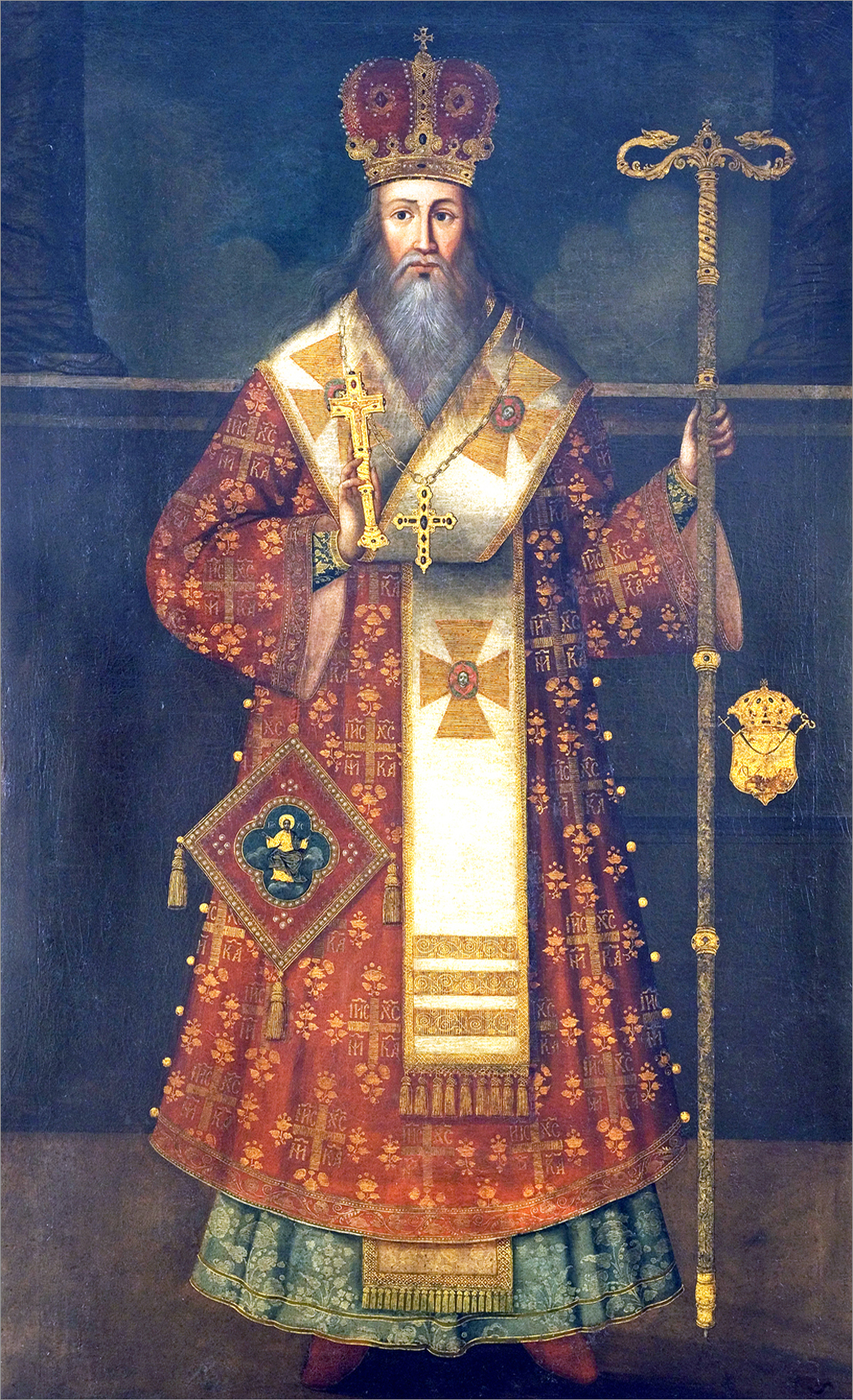
- Painting by Jov Vasilijevič (1744)
- Church: Serbian Patriarchate of Peć
- See: Patriarchate of Peć Monastery
- Installed: 1674
- Term ended: 1690 (1706)
- Predecessor: Maksim I
- Successor: Kalinik I

Personal details
- Born: Arsenije Crnojević; 1633 Cetinje, Ottoman Empire (modern-day Montenegro)
- Died: October 27, 1706 (aged 72–73) Vienna, Habsburg monarchy (modern-day Austria)
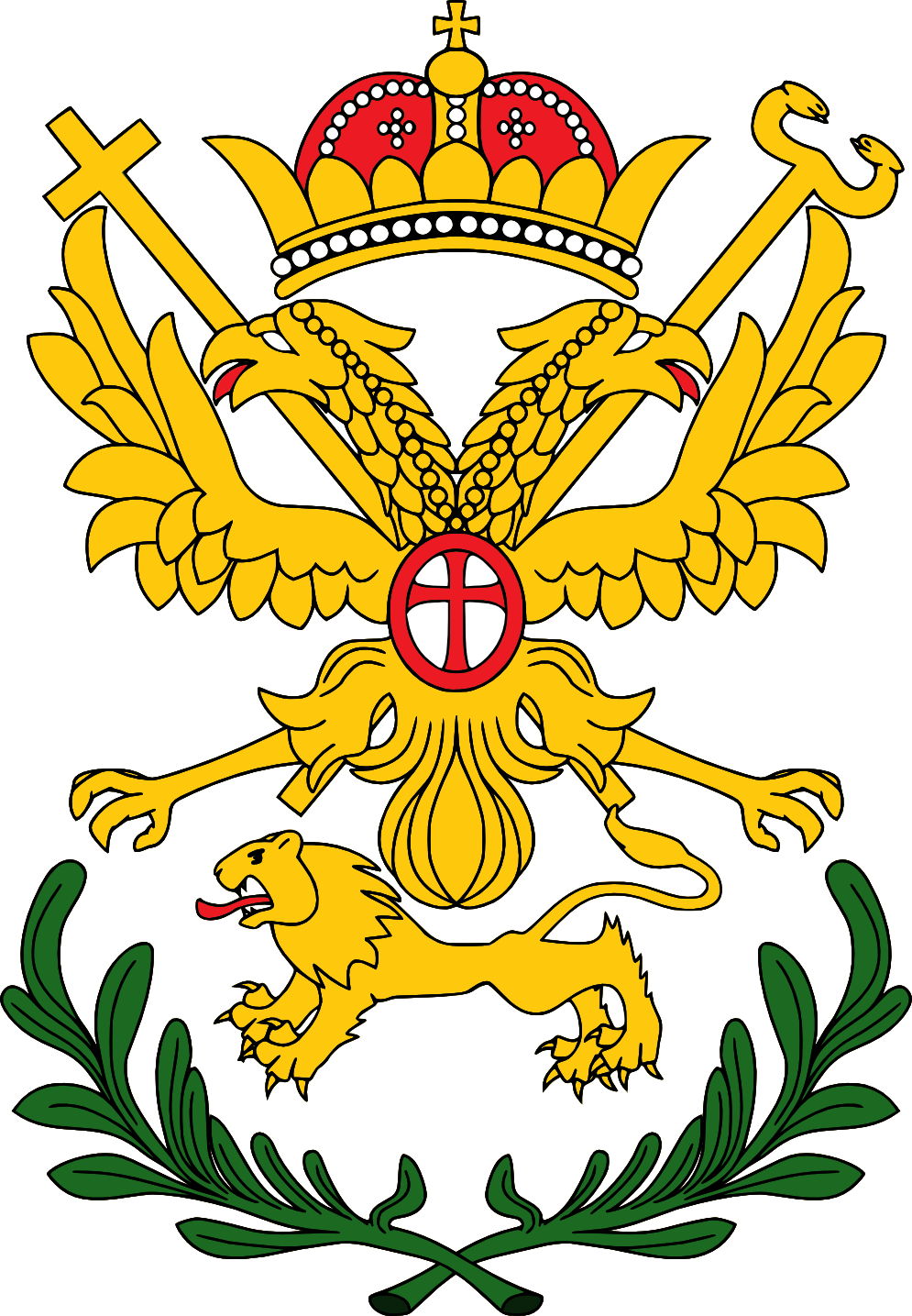
- Coat of arms

Arsenije III Crnojević (Serbian Cyrillic: Арсеније III Црнојевић; 1633 – 27 October 1706) was the Patriarch of the Serbian Patriarchate of Peć from 1674 to 1706. In 1689, during the Habsburg-Ottoman War (1683–1699), he sided with Habsburgs, upon their temporary occupation of Serbia. In 1690, he left the Patriarchal Monastery of Peć and led the Great Migration of Serbs from Ottoman Serbia into the Habsburg monarchy. There he received charters (the "Serbian Privileges" of 1690, 1691, and 1695), granted to him by Emperor Leopold I, securing religious and ecclesiastical autonomy of Eastern Orthodoxy in the Habsburg Monarchy. In the meanwhile, after restoring their rule in Serbian lands, Ottomans allowed the appointment of a new Serbian Patriarch, Kalinik I (1691–1710), thus creating a jurisdictional division within the Serbian Orthodox Church. Until death, in 1706, Patriarch Arsenije remained the head of Serbian Orthodox Church in Habsburg lands, laying foundations for the creation of an autonomous ecclesiastical province, later known as the Metropolitanate of Karlovci.

== Early life ==
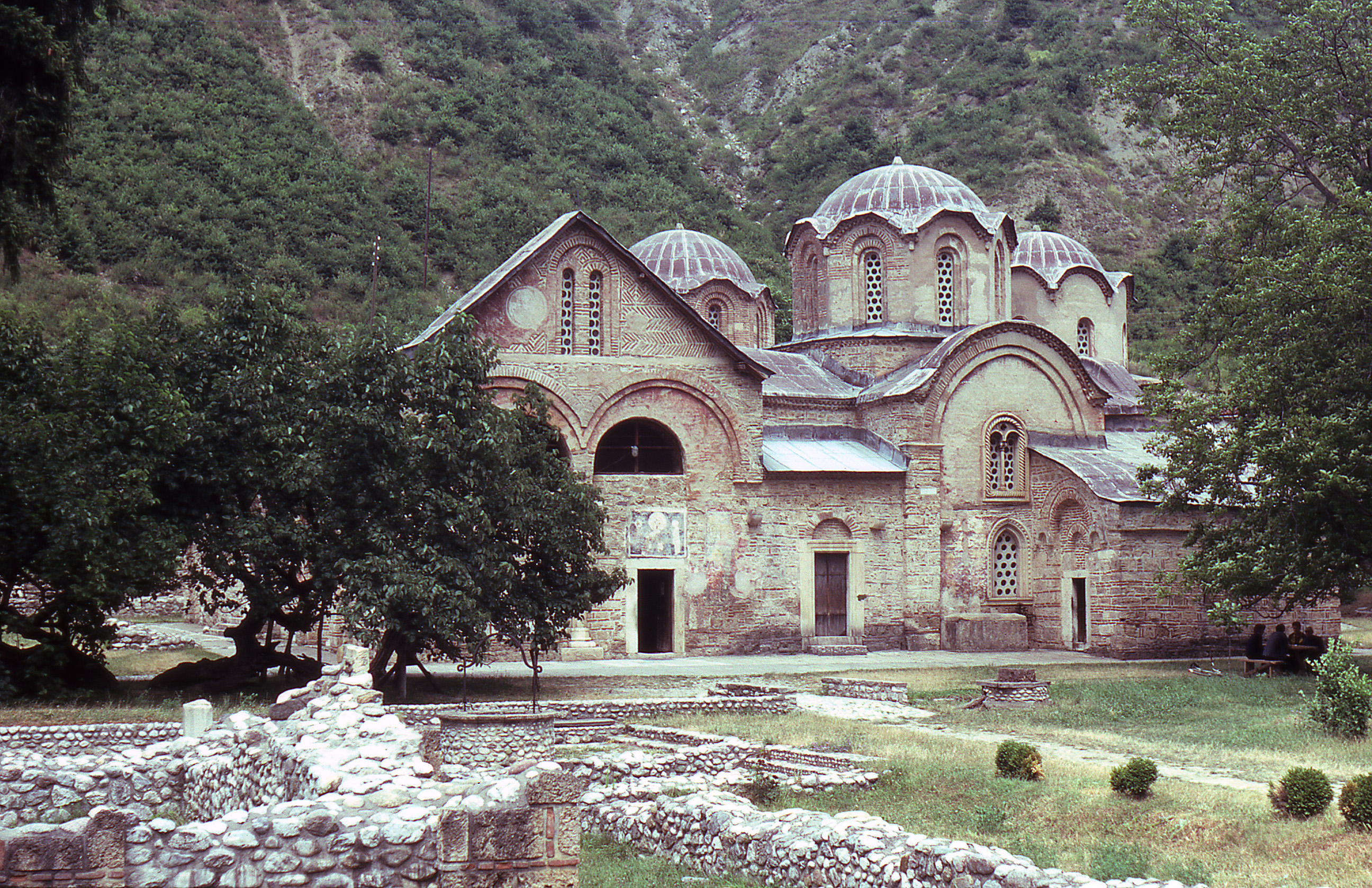
Patriarchal Monastery of Peć, seat of the Serbian Patriarchate of Peć

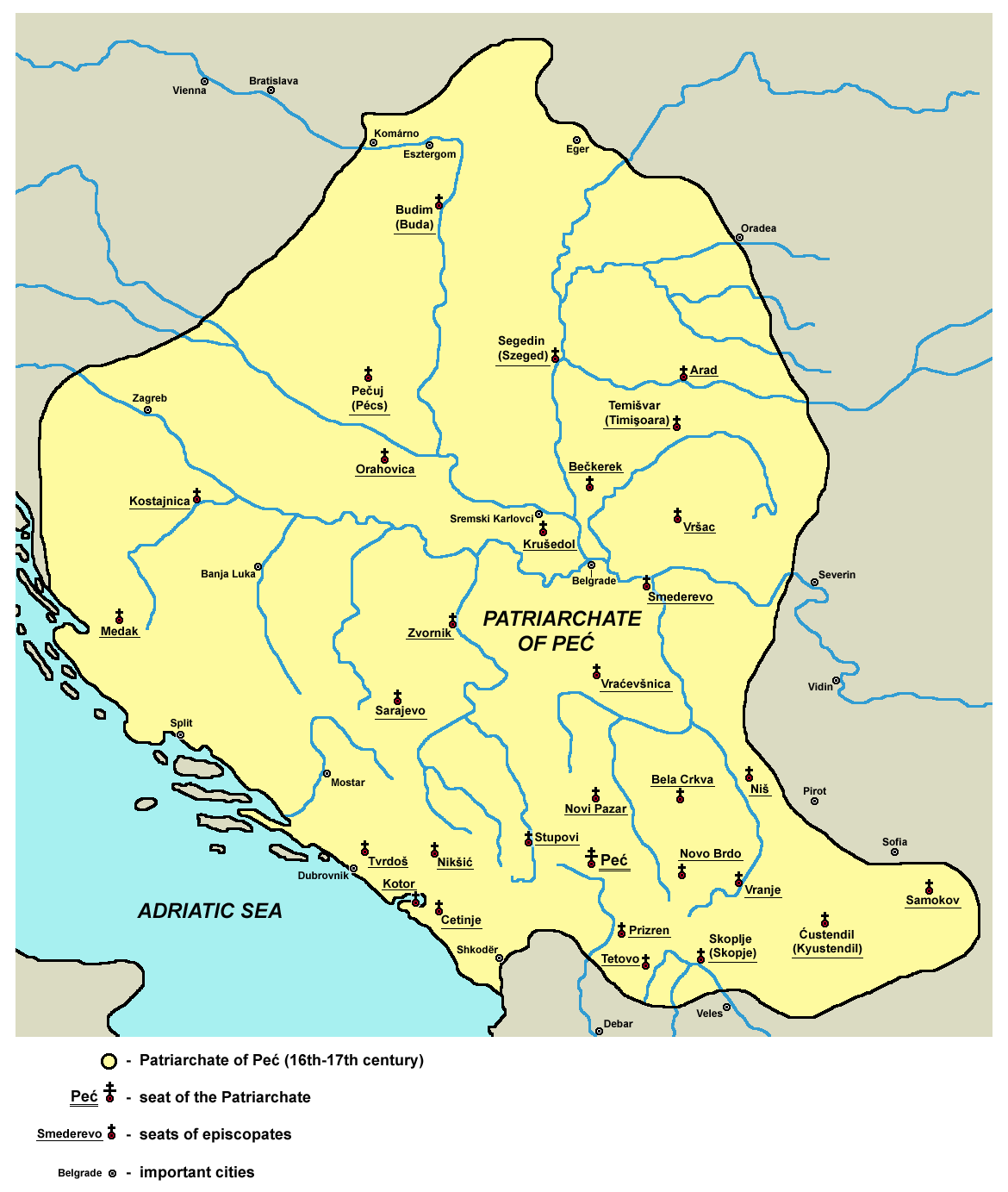
Serbian Patriarchate of Peć, during the 16th and 17th centuries

Arsenije, surnamed Crnojević (Црнојевић) or Črnojević (Чрнојевић), spelled in Church Slavonic as "Арсенїй Чарноевичь" (sr. Чарнојевић/Čarnojević), claimed to be a descendant of the medieval Crnojević family, which had ruled the region of Zeta in the second half of the 15th century. He was born in Bajice, hamlet of Cetinje in the Old Montenegro, a mountainous region.

As a young boy, Arsenije came to live in the Patriarchal Monastery of Peć, the seat of the Serbian Patriarchate of Peć, at the time led by Serbian Patriarch Maksim I. There, as he grew older, he was tonsured and ordained a deacon and then a priest, thanks to the good graces of his mentor Maksim whom Arsenije later described as "my father and teacher". In 1665, Arsenije became the abbot (archimandrite) of the Peć Monastery. Arsenije was elected as Metropolitan of Hvosno. He was consecrated bishop by the metropolitans of the Patriarchal Synod on the Feast of the Ascension in 1669 in Dovolja monastery. During the following years, he became the main assistant of the aging Patriarch Maksim. In 1674, when, Patriarch Maksim fell ill and decided to withdraw from the position, Arsenije was elected patriarch, probably between Easter and Ascension.

== Great Turkish War ==
Upon his return, in 1683, Arsenije III was in Nikolje Monastery where he received news of the Battle of Vienna (12 September 1683). The battle placed forces of the Ottoman Empire under Kara Mustafa Pasha against forces of the Holy League under John III Sobieski. The battle broke a two-month siege of Vienna and forced the Ottoman army to retreat. A note survives that reports Arsenije taking the news with pleasure.

As the war approached, and Serbs from Dalmatia, Herzegovina and the Bay of Kotor already took to arms, Arsenije III continued with his regular duties visiting Slavonia in 1684, but on the other hand secretly maintained contacted with forces of the League, particularly those of the Republic of Venice and the Archduchy of Austria. In 1685, Serbs in Montenegro and Dalmatia under the leadership of local guerilla leaders, such as Stojan Janković, fought in the ranks of the army of the Republic of Venice, led by Francesco Morosini (1619–1694), against the Ottoman Empire in the Morean War.

The passing Ottoman armies plundered the local populace mercilessly; the worst of them all was the one under notorious Yeğen Osman Pasha who for two years (1687–89) robbed the area from Belgrade to Ohrid and from Sofia to Peć. This force also managed to rob the vast treasure of the Serbian Patriarchate of Peć, deposited there for centuries. Jegen Osman-pasha in addition captured Arsenije III demanding a ransom of 10,000 thalers. After this was paid and he was released, Arsenije's mind was made up. He was soon forced to leave Peć because the Turks tried to assassinate him.

Arsenije contacted Peter I of Russia, asking the monarch to recognize him as the leader of the Serbs, but the Austrians cut these liaisons abruptly. Faced with Turkish threats, Arsenije escaped to Nikšić and then to his native Cetinje which was already taken by the Venetian forces. There, he swore allegiance to the Doge. However, his close ties with the Venetian Republic were scrutinized in Vienna. Representatives of Leopold I, Holy Roman Emperor warned Arsenije that unless he renewed his cooperation with the Habsburgs, they would see to the election of a more obedient patriarch. According to one letter written by Catholic bishop Peter Bogdani, rebellious Rumelian beylerbey Yeğen Osman Pasha threatened to cut off the head of Čarnojević because he allegedly received money from Habsburgs to instigate anti-Ottoman rebellion of Orthodox Serbs. According to historian Noel Malcolm however, Arsenije did not lead any organized resistance to the Ottomans. One Venetian report claims he fled northwards and was robbed by 'Rascians'.

== Habsburg rule ==
In 1688, the Habsburg army took Belgrade and entered the territory of present-day Central Serbia. Louis William, Margrave of Baden-Baden called Arsenije III to raise arms against the Turks; the patriarch accepted and returned to the liberated Peć. As Serbia fell under Habsburg control, Leopold I granted Arsenije nobility and the title of duke. In early November, Arsenije III possibly met with Habsburg commander-in-chief, General Enea Silvio Piccolomini in Prizren; after this talk he sent a note to all Serb bishops to come to him and collaborate only with Habsburg forces. It is uncertain whether Arsenije actually met with Piccolomini given that Catholic Bishop Bogdani met with Piccolomini multiple times to rally the population of Prizren in support of the Austrians. The venetian writer Camillo Contarini described how 5,000 inhabitants of Prizren came out to greet Piccolomini and that they were led by "their Archbishop". Serbian historians identified the Archbishop as being Arsenije while others have theorized that both Bogdani and Arsenije were present, but the most prevailing evidence suggests that Arsenije was in Montenegro at the time and did not return to Kosovo until several weeks after Piccolomini's death from the plague. Following Piccolomini's death that same month, the tide of the war turned in favor of the Ottomans who forced the Habsburg Army to withdraw from their conquered territories and enacted brutal reprisals against the Serbian population for their collaboration with the Habsburgs.

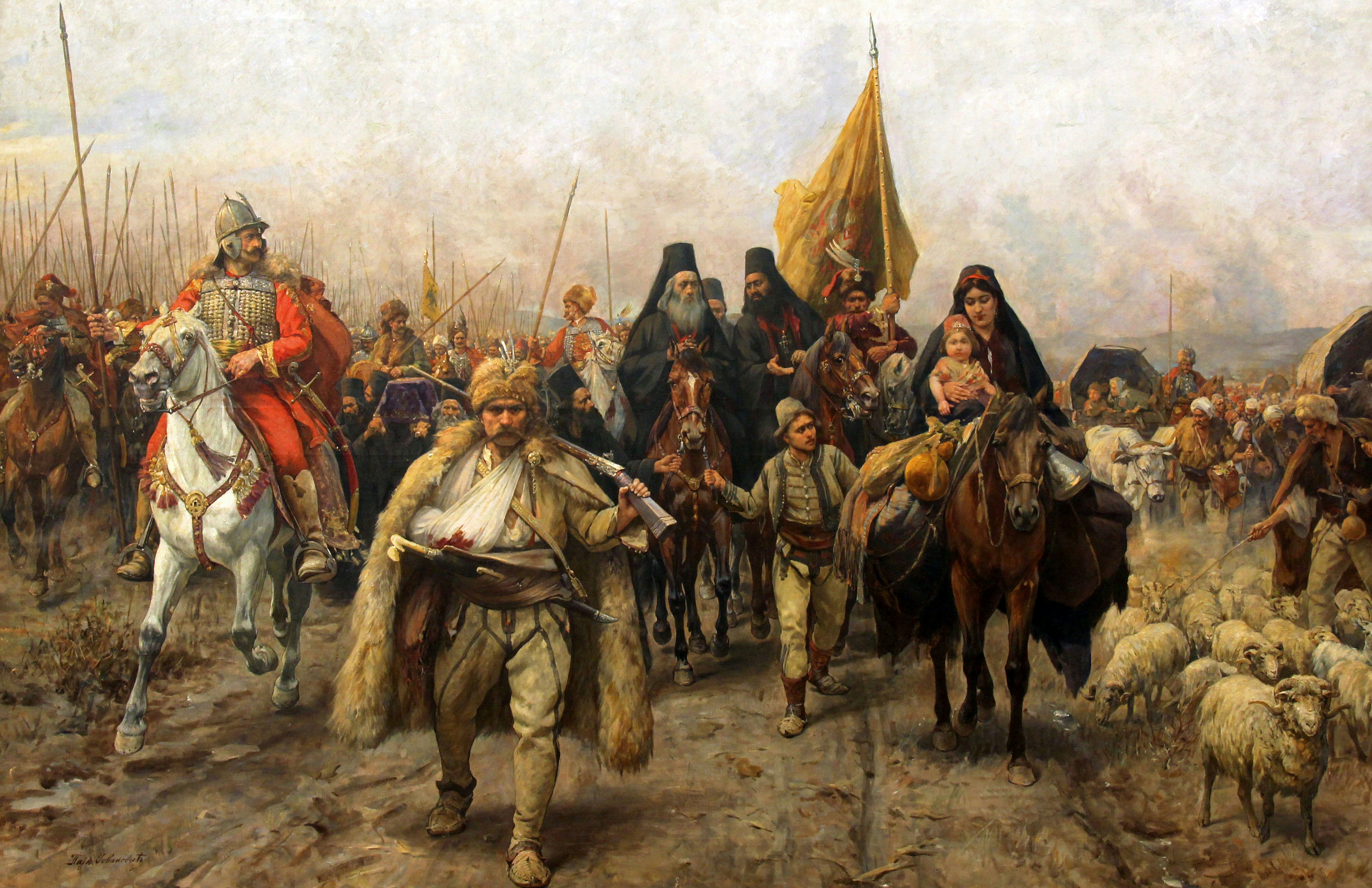
The Migration of Serbs (1896), by Paja Jovanović

As the tide turned in 1690, and Turks advanced through Serbia, Arsenije retreated along with about 37,000 Serb families to the north, in what would be termed the Great migration of Serbs. Arsenije wrote that 30,000 "souls" (people) followed him, and on another occasion he gave the figure of 40,000, although the veracity of these numbers are doubtful. Malcolm argues that Arsenije did not lead a mass exodus of Serbs from Kosovo as it is sometimes suggested, noting that only a small part of the refugees came from Kosovo.

In April, Emperor Leopold had issued his Letter of Invitation, as well as a personal letter to Arsenije. The letter of invitation urged Serbs and other Balkan nations to rise up against the Ottomans, promising them liberties, including freedom of religion for their loyalty to the Habsburg monarchy. It did not envisage a Serbian exodus into the Empire, and encouraged Serbs to stay in their ancestral lands. With continued Ottoman plundering and an exodus impending, Arsenije III organized the first ecclesiastical and national gathering in Belgrade (Beogradski sabor) on 11 June which met and decided to accept Leopold as Serbian king, and to send Bishop Isaija Đaković to Vienna as their representative for negotiations with the Emperor. The assembly asked that the following alterations be included in the document: freedom of confession, freedom to elect their Patriarch, return re-conquered lands and monasteries, and full immunity to the Patriarch and high clergy to perform their pastoral visitations in territories under their spiritual jurisdiction. In grave need of soldiers and farmers, on 21 August, Leopold issued his first Chapter on Privileges in which he recognizes Serbs within the Habsburg monarchy as a separate political entity (corpus separatum) under the Serbian Orthodox Church. This edict guaranteed them national and religious singularity and certain rights and freedoms in the Habsburg monarchy. Subsequent privileges issued between 1691 and 1695 provided legal framework and guarantee for Serb continuity in the Empire, although these promises were largely fictitious and these privileges would be used to control the Serbian populace and diminish the authority of the Archbishops over the course of the 18th century.

On 29 September, Serbs—led by the key person of these processes Arsenije III—started the crossing of Sava and the Danube. Driven by further Turkish advance, they fled upstream the Danube all the way to Buda and Szentendre. This migration increased the number of Serbs in the Pannonian Plain. The privileges that were given to the Serbs by Leopold formed the legal base for the creation of Serbian Vojvodina in the 19th century, if not before.

Soon, Arsenije III was upset by news that the clergy of the Roman Catholic Church was forcing the newly arrived Serbs to convert. Upon reporting this to the Emperor, he was granted the Diploma of Protection for the Serbs and their religion on 11 December 1690. In the following years, Arsenije III traveled through the Habsburg realms, including the Kingdom of Hungary, Croatia and Slavonia with this diploma allowing him to stop the forceful conversions, ordering new priests and organizing the church. At the same time, he was inaugurating new Serb infantry and hussar regiments that were to aid in the ongoing war.

== Falling out of favor ==
As the religious pressures mounted, Serbian leaders met in 1694 in Baja demanding a separate territory where Serbs would settle – Slavonia and Syrmia were proposed. The Viennese court began to view Arsenije as a threat and a burden and started to promote other Serb leaders.

In 1695, Arsenije III formed seven new bishoprics in the territories where they were scarce prior to the migration of 1690. This was protected by another diploma (the last in the line) since it disrupted the decree of the Fourth Council of the Lateran that prevented two bishops from holding jurisdiction in the same area. Meanwhile, Serbs fought in the decisive Battle of Slankamen and Senta, in which the Turks were utterly defeated

After the Treaty of Karlowitz was concluded, Serb assistance was no longer needed and the Habsburg authorities started disregarding the previously given privileges one by one. Upon the advice of the proselyte fanatic Cardinal Leopold Kolonić, in 1701 the rights of Arsenije III as the "Serbian Patriarch" were limited to the newcomers living in the vicinity of Szentendre and he was reduced in rank to the "Metropolitan", a title which was never accepted by Serbs. In connection with this, Arsenije was also forbidden to leave the town. In 1703, he was prohibited to use the title of patriarch and all Orthodox bishops were to recognize the authority of Roman Catholic ones.

However, things changed when in 1703, the rebellion of Hungarians under Francis II Rákóczi erupted. Austrian forces needed the Serbs’ assistance once more and privileges were instantaneously confirmed. Arsenije III was sent from Vienna to the Serb areas to explain the situation to the people.

He died in 1706 in Vienna. He was buried in the Krušedol monastery in Syrmia.

== Legacy ==
He is included in The 100 most prominent Serbs book.

== See also ==
- List of heads of the Serbian Orthodox Church
- Metropolitanate of Karlovci

Eastern Orthodox Church titles
Preceded by Maksim I	Serbian Patriarch; 1674–1690 (1706)	Succeeded by Kalinik I
Preceded by Post created	Serbian Metropolitan in Habsburg monarchy 1690–1706	Succeeded by Isaija Đaković

== Sources ==
- Ćirković, Sima (2004). The Serbs. Malden: Blackwell Publishing. ISBN 9781405142915.
- Samardžić, Radovan; Duškov, Milan, eds. (1993). Serbs in European Civilization. Belgrade: Nova, Serbian Academy of Sciences and Arts, Institute for Balkan Studies. ISBN 9788675830153.
- Слијепчевић, Ђоко М. (1962). Историја Српске православне цркве (History of the Serbian Orthodox Church). Vol. књ. 1. Минхен: Искра.
- Kašić, Dušan, ed. (1965). Serbian Orthodox Church: Its past and present. Vol. 1. Belgrade: Serbian Orthodox Church.
- Kašić, Dušan, ed. (1966). Serbian Orthodox Church: Its past and present. Vol. 2. Belgrade: Serbian Orthodox Church.
- Todorović, Jelena (2006). An Orthodox Festival Book in the Habsburg Empire: Zaharija Orfelin's Festive Greeting to Mojsej Putnik (1757). Aldershot: Ashgate Publishing. ISBN 9780754656111.
- Тричковић, Радмила (1994). "Српски патријарх Калиник I: Друга обнова Пећке патријаршије (Serbian Patriarch Kalinik I: The Second Revival of the Peć Patriarchate)". Историјски часопис (39: 1992): 87–118.
- Вуковић, Сава (1996). Српски јерарси од деветог до двадесетог века (Serbian Hierarchs from the 9th to the 20th Century). Београд: Евро.
