= Jovan Ćulibrk =

Serbian Orthodox bishop (born 1965)

His Grace Jovan
- Bishop of Pakrac and Slavonia
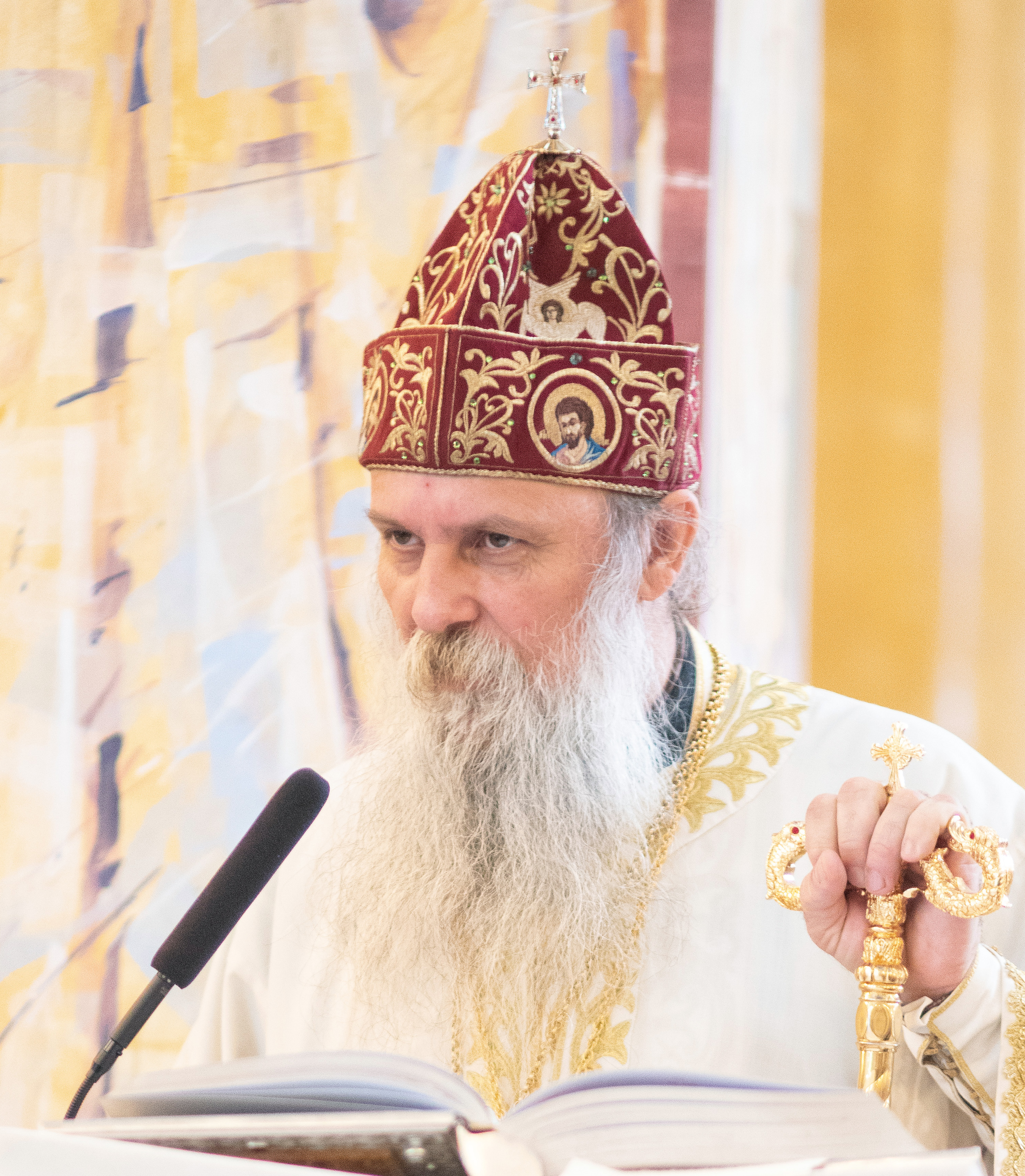
- Bishop Jovan in 2019
- Church: Serbian Orthodox Church
- Diocese: Eparchy of Pakrac and Slavonia
- See: Pakrac
- Installed: 13 September 2014
- Predecessor: Sava Jurić
- Previous post: Titular Bishop of Lipljan (2011–2014)

Orders
- Ordination: 1992
- Rank: Bishop

Personal details
- Born: Neven Ćulibrk; 16 April 1965 (age 61) Zenica, SR Bosnia and Herzegovina, SFR Yugoslavia
- Denomination: Eastern Orthodoxy
- Education: University of Zagreb; Hebrew University of Jerusalem

Jovan Ćulibrk (Serbian Cyrillic: Јован Ћулибрк; born 16 April 1965), is a Serbian Orthodox prelate who is the current bishop of Pakrac and Slavonia of the Serbian Orthodox Church, from 2014. Before that, he was titular bishop of Lipljan between 1999 and 2014 Ćulibrk was an active music critic and author about rock and roll and pop culture.

== Early life and education ==
Jovan was born as Neven Ćulibrk (Serbian Cyrillic: Невен Ћулибрк) on 16 April 1965, in Zenica, SR Bosnia and Herzegovina, Yugoslavia (now in Bosnia and Herzegovina). He finished elementary school and a high school in Bosanska Gradiška.

Ćulibrk studied literature in Banja Luka, then literature and South Slavic languages at the Faculty of Philosophy University of Zagreb, from which he graduated in 1991 with a thesis on the work of Miloš Crnjanski. His work on Crnjanski was awarded with the Branko Award by Matica Srpska. Hereupon, he studied theology at the University of Belgrade and at the Faculty of Orthodox Theology in Foča, Bosnia and Herzegovina where he graduated with a work on Nikon the Jerusalemite. Afterwards, Ćulibrk attended postgraduate studies on Jewish culture at the Yad Vashem and at the Hebrew University of Jerusalem. He defended his master's degree thesis under the guidance of David Bankier, head of the International Institute for Holocaust Research in Yad Vashem. In 2004, he was awarded Golda Meir Award.

In the 1980s, Ćulibrk was an active rock critic, interested in contemporary art, and published a number of essays and articles about pop culture and rock and roll.

He speaks Serbian, English, Russian, Yiddish and uses German, Greek and several Slavic languages.

== Monasticism ==
In 1991, Ćulibrk entered the Savina Monastery as a novice. In 1992, he moved to the Cetinje Monastery. On the eve of Nativity of John the Baptist in 1993, he was tonsured a monk there, receiving the monastic name of Jovan (from Church Slavonic: Їωан).

From 1993 to 2003, Jovan lectured on Serbian and Slovene literature, general history, and was also the secretary of Theological Seminary of St. Peter of Cetinje. On 31 October 1995 in the Stanjevići Monastery, Budva Metropolitan bishop Amfilohije Radović of Montenegro and the Littoral ordained him as a hierodeacon. On 16 June 1997, he was ordained hieromonk.

In 1997, Jovan was appointed monk of Moračnik Monastery, Moračnik Island. He worked on the renovation of churches and monasteries on Lake Skadar. In 1998, he participated in the creation of the Radio Svetigora, the first radio channel of the Serbian Orthodox Church, and since then has remained its employee.

Since June 1999, Jovan has been at the Patriarchate of Peć in Kosovo and Metochia. He supervised the Church relations with the KFOR and United Nations Interim Administration Mission in Kosovo. He worked for the salvation of religious objects, refugee protection, calculating and determining the number of victims, wounded, lost, expelled and working on the documentation of the suffering of Serbs civilians. In January 2001, Jovan visited Israel, as a member of the Yugoslavia State Delegation, and prestented his viewpoints on the Kosovo Question. In the same year, this connection went to Italy to build cooperation with Italian institutions for the protection of the heritage of the Serbian Orthodox Church in Kosovo and Metochia.

During the 2000s, Jovan served at a number of temples and monasteries in the Holy Land, including Sarandar Monastery on Mount of Temptation.

In the early 2000s, Jovan contributed to the efforts of the Serbian Orthodox Church for the rehabilitation of Nikolaj Velimirović, a controversial figure due to his extensive anti-Semitic rhetoric in the 1930s. Jovan has faced criticism by some authors for not addressing antisemitism within the Church and the work of Velimirović. He organised and led the project of adapting poems written by Nikolaj Velimirović into rock music album, titled Pesme iznad istoka i zapada (Songs beyond East and West), which gathered a number of Serbian and Yugoslav rock bands.

In 2004, he was awarded Golda Meir Award and in 2020 he was awarded the Israeli order "Knight of Ladino".

On 12 July 2007 in Cetinje, Jovan was erected as Protosyncellus.

Jovan has emphasized the necessity for political and military victories of the Bosnian Serb community over that of spiritual victory despite military defeat. According to Ćulibrk, this victory is reflected in the "cleansing" of a part of multiethnic Bosnia by the Serb forces. As such Ćulibrk has claimed that "Serbian Sarajevo is also the symbol of a town cleansed by fire".

=== Jasenovac Committee ===
In 2002, Ćulibrk participated in the third international conference about Jasenovac concentration camp in Jerusalem. He led Serbian delegations to international conferences on the Holocaust in 2004, 2006, 2008 and 2010. In 2006 in Israel, he gave lectures on Breakup of Yugoslavia and interethnic relations at the Vidal Sassoon Center in Jerusalem. On March 14–15, 2007, as a representative of the Serbian Orthodox Church, he participated in the 6th meeting between Orthodoxy and Judaism at Van Leer Jerusalem Institute.

In his role as the director of the Jasenovac Committee, Jovan has claimed that the Jasenovac concentration camp was the "worst of all camps and extermination sites in WWII".

He widely developed the work of the Jasenovac Commission of the Serbian Church to promote the worldwide awareness of the Genocide of Serbs. In 2009, he gave two lectures on Jewish history and culture at the Faculty of Philosophy in Belgrade and he gave lectures again on Jewish culture in Belgrade in 2020.

== Titular bishop of Lipljan (2011–2014) ==
Elected in May 2011, Jovan was consecrated Bishop of Lipljan, a vicar to the Serbian Patriarch, on 4 September. The consecration was performed by the Serbian Patriarch Irinej.

After three years, he left the position following his election for the bishop of Slavonia.

== Bishop of Pakrac and Slavonia (2014–present) ==
The Bishops' Council of the Serbian Orthodox Church appointed Jovan as the new Bishop Bishop of Pakrac and Slavonia in May 2014. On 13 September, he was enthroned as the head of Eparchy of Pakrac and Slavonia in the Holy Trinity Cathedral in Pakrac, Croatia. The consecration was performed by the Serbian Patriarch Irinej.

== Personal life ==
In October 2002, Jovan was introduced to the reserve composition of the 63rd Parachute Brigade of the Serbian Army, where he received military training and non-commissioned officer rank of Sergeant first class. In 2002, he visited Italy as a guest of the Italian Paratroopers Brigade "Folgore" and established good relations of the brigade and the Serbian Church. He emphasized the importance of getting vaccinated during the COVID-19 pandemic crisis.

== Selected works ==
Books

- Historiography of the holocaust in Yugoslavia, 2014

Articles

- Crno sunce i oko njega krug : geometrija jedne tajne pjesme Miloša Crnjanskog, 2001
- O muzici i vaspitanju, 2001
- The State of Israel and its Relations with Successor States of Former Yugoslavia During the Balkan Conflict of 1991-1999 and in its Aftermath, 2008

Eastern Orthodox Church titles
Preceded by Sava Jurić	Bishop of Pakrac and Slavonia; 2014–present	Incumbent
Preceded by Teodosije Šibalić	Titular bishop of Lipljan; 2011–2014	Vacant
