= Moračnik =

Moračnik may refer to:

- Moračnik Monastery
- Moračnik (island), in Lake Skadar in the municipality of Bar in Montenegro
