= Miron Nikolić =

Serbian Patriarch

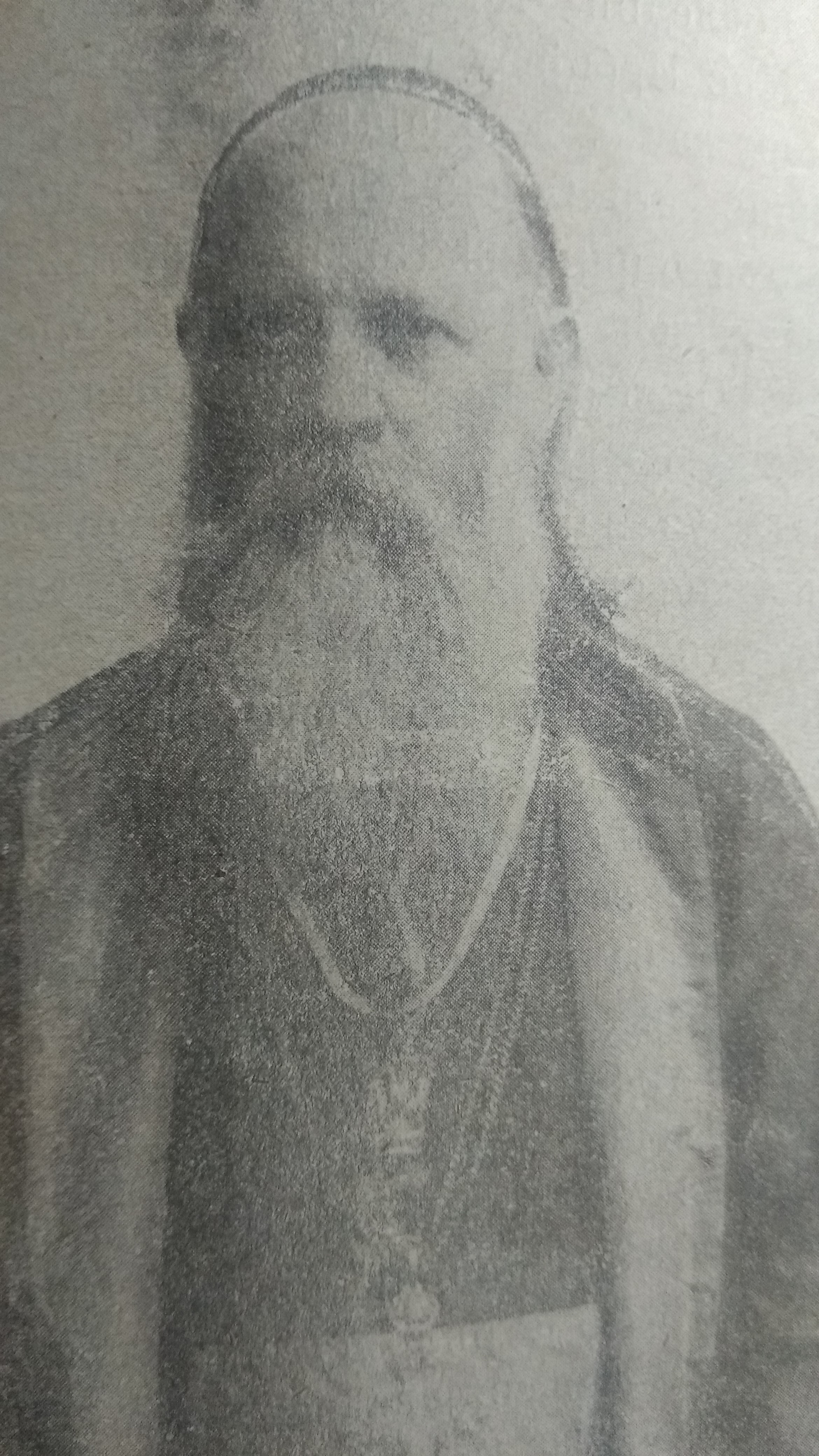
Miron Nikolić

Miron Nikolić (worldly name: Mihailo Nikolić; 27 February 1846 - 18 February 1941) was bishop of the Patriarchate of Karlovci and, after 1920, of the united Serbian Orthodox Church.

Bishop Miron is one of the bishops of the Serbian Orthodox Church with the longest standing record in the profession, 51 years, and at the same time, he was a priest of the Serbian Orthodox Church with the longest standing at the head of one diocese.

== Biography ==
Mihailo Nikolić was born on 27 February 1846 in the village of Kapelni, in Slavonian Podravina, to father Paul, priest, and mother Ana, a housewife. He completed gymnasium in Podravska Slatina, and École normale supérieure in Osijek where he received his teacher's certificate. He taught high school in Osijek, Sremski Karlovci and Novi Sad, and theology in Pakrac.

Prior to receiving the monastic rank, he was a clerk in the Consistory office, a notary and a teacher in Daruvar.

== Monastic life ==
He received the monastic rank on 10 October 1870 in the monastery of Orahovica from Abbot Maksim of Rahovec. He was ordained deacon on 28 October of the same year. He became a Protodeacon in 1871, and presbyter in 1874. He was made Archimandrite in 1878. He received ordination from his predecessor, Bishop Nikanor Grujić of Pakrac. After his death, on 8 April 1887, Archimandrite Miron became the mandate of Patriarch German Anđelić in the Eparchy of Pakrac.

He was elected bishop of Pakrac on 10 October 1888. Since Patriarch German Anđelić died shortly afterwards, Archimandrite Miron was consecrated only in 1890, after the election of the new Patriarch Georgije Branković. The consecration ceremony of Bishop Miron was performed on 3 May 1890 by the Patriarch Georgije (Branković) and two bishops Nektarije of Vršac and Vesilijan of Bačka.

As a bishop, Miron dedicated special care to the priesthood, instituted priesthood confessions, brotherhood councils, made teaching and educational improvements of the clerical personnel by opening libraries in parishes, and establishing a fund for the support of children and orphans of the clergy of the Eparchy of Pakrac. Taking care of the teacher's youth, he succeeded in establishing a Teacher's College in 1894, buying a building for the teacher's school and opening a boarding school for the students of the school who could otherwise ill afford their education.

During the expatriation of Serbs from Slavonia to America, Bishop Miron warned the clergy to protect the people from emigration, and in this sense wrote a letter. Bishop Miron administered the vacant Patriarchate of Karlovci on occasion (1913 and 1914-1919) after taking over the locum tenens post from Bishop of Gornji Karlovac Mihailo Grujić.

In the last seven years of his life he was unable to perform liturgy, because of a leg fracture. He died on 18 February 1941 in Pakrac, and was buried in the Gavrinica church where his grave was desecrated during the breakup of Yugoslavia in the 1990s.

Eastern Orthodox Church titles
Preceded by Nikanor Grujić	Bishop of Pakrac; 1888—1941	Succeeded by Damaskin Grdanički
