= Prokopije Ivačković =

Austro-Hungarian cleric

Prokopije Ivačković (Procopie Ivacicovici, Ivácskovics Prokop)
- Patriarch of Karlovci
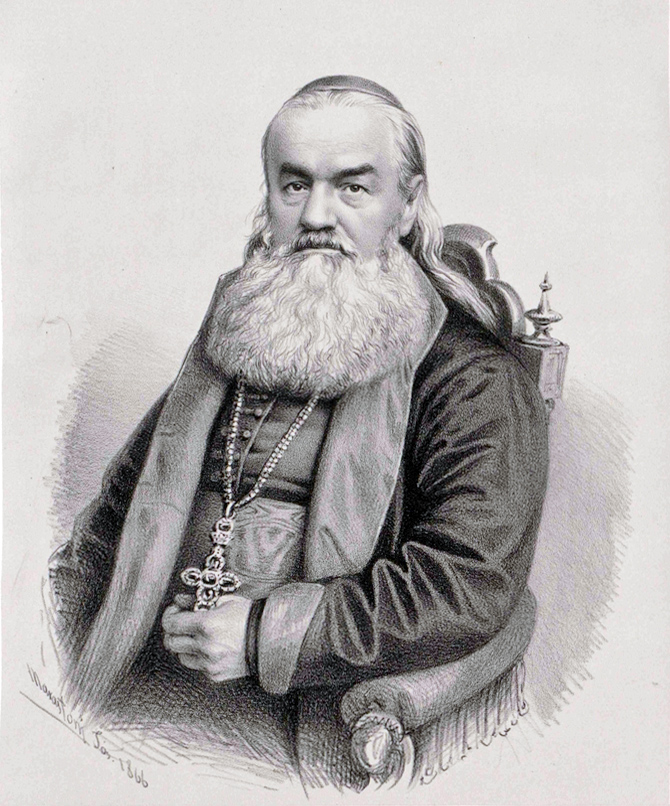
- Bishops Procopius in 1866
- Church: Serbian Orthodox Church; Romanian Orthodox Church
- Appointed: July 19, 1874
- Term ended: December 11, 1879
- Predecessor: Samuilo Maširević
- Successor: German Anđelić
- Other posts: Metropolitan of Transylvania; Bishop of Arad; Starets of Krušedol monastery

Orders
- Ordination: 1833 by Stefan Stratimirović

Personal details
- Born: August 8, 1808 Deliblato, Banat Military Frontier, Austrian Empire
- Died: May 11, 1881 (aged 72) Bela Crkva (Fehértemplom), Transleithania, Austria-Hungary
- Buried: Karlovci Cathedral

Prokopije or Procopius (Serbian: Прокопије; Romanian: Procopie or Romanian: Procopiu, Hungarian: Prokop; born Petar Ivačković, Serbian Cyrillic: Петар Ивачковић, Romanian: Petru Ivacicovici, Hungarian: Ivácskovics Péter; August 8, 1808 – May 11, 1881) was an Austro-Hungarian cleric of the Romanian Orthodox and Serbian Orthodox churches who ultimately served as the latter's Patriarch at Karlovci. He was born in the Banat as a subject of the Austrian Empire, his ethnic affiliations alternating between the Serb and Romanian communities. Ivačković's early life was spent in Serbian Orthodox institutions, and he was seen as a Serb loyalist before he became Bishop of Arad. During the 1860s, he expressed support for Romanian nationalism, primarily as a founder of the National Aradian Association for Romanian Popular Culture. He backed Andrei Șaguna's bid to set up the Romanian-centered Metropolis of Transylvania, becoming its suffragan bishop; during the Serb–Romanian church partition, he extended the Arad Bishopric south into the Banat.

In the final part of his career, Ivačković's mission intertwined with the ethnic conflicts of Transleithanian Hungary. In 1873, following Șaguna's death and the row between Romanian conservatives and liberals, and being the more neutral choice, he was elected Transylvanian Metropolitan. A similar conflict among the Serbs propelled him to the office of Patriarch in 1874. Rejected by Romanian nationalists for having left his Transylvanian seat, Ivačković came to be seen as an associate of the Serb liberals. Although already old and ailing, his resignation in 1879 was widely attributed to Hungarian intrigues, involving Kálmán Tisza, Ágoston Trefort, and Ivačković's eventual successor, German Anđelić. Ivačković spent his final years away from the public eye, dying in Bela Crkva.

== Biography ==
=== Early career ===
The future bishop was born in the village of Deliblato, on the Banat Military Frontier (now within the Kovin municipality of Serbia). He was the scion of a priestly family called Ivașcu, Iovașcu, Ivacicovici, Ivașcovici, Ivacicoviciu, Ivacskovics;, from Goruia village in today's Caraș-Severin County, Romania. During his youth, most of the Banat was administered by Austria as part of the Habsburg Kingdom of Hungary. In this ethnically diverse environment, he frequented Serb and Romanian Austrians, which were at the time united under a single Serbian Orthodox jurisdiction: the Metropolis of Karlovci. In some church circles and several historical records, Ivačković is described as a "Serb-educated" ethnic Romanian, or moreover as "Serbified". An 1888 feuilleton in the church magazine Biseric'a si Scóla claims that Ivačković was raised by "our brothers the Serbs", "which is why we thought he was one of them". Historian Aurel A. Mureșianu argues that Ivačković, a "Romanian Banatian", was actually born Ivașcu. His name was given a Serbian suffix because "Serbifying Romanian names was the fashion in Transylvania and the Banat" before 1850. Researcher Cvetko Pavlović links Prokopije with the "Romanian rebel" clan Ivačković, who had settled in Montenegro Vilayet as Muslims.

In other records, the family appears as Serb and Romanianized. From 1815, Sofronie Ivașcovici from Deliblato, who was Prokopije's older brother, taught Romanian at the seminary of Vršac. A complaint against him identified him as "Serb by birth". As reported in 1870 by the Arad magazine Gura Satului, the family's ethnicity was seen as neither "plain Serb" nor "plain Romanian", with members of both communities rejecting them. However, the same source claimed that the Ivașcus were "an old Romanian family". In a 1906 book, Romanian historian Nicolae Iorga referred to Prokopije as "the Serb Ivacicovici", a designation also found in a 1909 piece by Ioan Russu-Șirianu, who further contends that the bishop "could not speak Romanian". In his 1920s memoirs, the novelist Ioan Slavici describes the bishop as "a Banatian who did not speak proper Romanian, but was seen as a Romanian". Historians Dejan Mikavica and Goran Vasin also suggest that Ivačković was a Serb, though one "acquainted with the Romanian language and perceived by the Romanians as their bishop.". Mihai Spariosu wrote: "the most accurate way of evaluating both brothers, as well as their entire family, is not in terms of one national history or another, but as an illustrious representative of the intercultural history of a culturally diverse, borderland region".

After attending gymnasium in Oradea and Novi Sad, Ivačković studied philosophy in Kesmark, theology in Vršac and law in Sárospatak. A protege of Metropolitan Stefan Stratimirović, he began a career in teaching in 1833. Before 1835, he was a clerk of the Metropolis, in the eponymous seat of Karlovci. Tonsured a monk at Grgeteg monastery, he was hired as a professor at the Theological Seminary in Karlovci in 1835, also taking on the role of secretary in 1838. In 1843, he became an assessor for the Metropolis, and in 1846, having been made an archimandrite, became superior of Krušedol monastery (located, from 1849, in the Serbian Voivodeship).

From 1853 to 1873, Ivačković was Bishop of Arad, within the new Patriarchate of Karlovci. The Serb hierarchy viewed this as a compromise move, the appointment of a fellow prelate who seemingly opposed Romanian nationalism. He frustrated this attempt by working closely with dissident bishop Andrei Șaguna, insisting that his own priests read and circulate Romanian books and newspapers, and organizing theological education in the Romanian vernacular. In 1855, he and Șaguna reputedly endorsed Nicolae Tincu-Velea as Archpriest of Caransebeș, but their favorite was rejected by Emilijan Kengelac, the Bishop of Vršac. In other aspects of his mission, Ivačković also adhered to the Austrian line, ordering in 1854 the destruction of church documents which showed trace of collaboration with the rebellious Hungarian State of 1849. His early contributions included solving a conflict between Romanian and Greco-Hungarian parishioners of the church in Szentes. While in Arad, he also built the Nativity of St. John the Baptist Cathedral.

During the 1860s, Ivačković's involvement with the nationalist cause was public. In September 1862, Romanian Orthodox notables in Transylvania, the Banat, and the Duchy of Bukovina co-wrote a petition to the Emperor Franz Joseph, asking for a Romanian jurisdiction to be carved out of Karlovci territories. Ivačković, Șaguna, Ioan Popasu and Theophil Bendella were the leading church officials included on the signatories' list; lay names included Emanoil Gojdu, Baron Wassilko, the Hurmuzachis, and the Mocioni family. In 1863, Ivačković was made the first president of National Aradian Association for Romanian Popular Culture, and was later honorary president. Also known as the "Aradian ASTRA" after Șaguna's similar institution, it was reportedly founded on Ivačković's initiative. This activity brought Ivačković into contact with a generation of Romanian nationalists and House of Lorraine loyalists. They include Vincențiu Babeș, Ioan Rațiu, and the Mocionis: Anton Mocioni was the executive secretary; through Andrei Mocioni, the Association claimed patronage from the emperor.

=== Transylvanian suffragan and Metropolitan ===
After 1864, when the Romanian Orthodox Metropolis of Transylvania was restored and he became a suffragan bishop thereof, Ivačković worked for the hierarchical separation of the Romanians from the Serbian Orthodox Church. He then helped Șaguna tackle what he saw as abuse from the Serb coreligionists, during the splitting of property. During partition, he lost his Serb parishioners, including as many as 5,000 in Arad-proper, as well as the Greek parish of Szentes, which went to Karlovci. However, he was able to consolidate his province with new Banatian parishes, as the Protopopiate of Timișoara, followed in 1865 by the Diocese of Caransebeș. By 1900, church historian Ilarion Pușcariu noted that the Protopopiate was never raised into a bishopric, because the "greedy" Ivačković would not relinquish control; this verdict was contested by author P. Ionescu, who noted that Pușcariu had little proof for his claim. In 1868, Ivačković gave his blessing to the separation of Oradea Mare Diocese, although this never occurred during his reign.

In parallel, he assisted the Orthodox community of Gyula, in the Great Hungarian Plain, building them a new church and school. By 1869, he also managed to re-include into Timișoara Protopopiate the Romanian parish of Parța, which had been nominally lost to Greek Catholicism. He increased the bishopric revenue by instituting a parishioners' tax, but also benefited from a large inheritance, bequeathed by Gojdu. Serving with Șaguna as estate curator from April 1870, Ivačković instituted regular services to honor Gojdu's memory. He also presided over a similar board overseeing the estate of Elena Ghiba Birta, which went to sponsoring Orthodox girls' schools.

The Romanian cause was frustrated by the creation of Austria-Hungary, which placed the Metropolis within a centralized Transleithanian Hungary. As Slavici reports, already by time of the Venetian crisis, which rekindled Hungarian nationalism, there were points of contacts between Ivačković and the Hungarians of Arad. The latter agitated among the Serbs and Romanians, hoping to obtain their support for a break with Austria, and to this end held an illuminated procession outside the bishop's residence. Prokopije's nephew, known as György (or George) Ivácskovics, saluted this trend and became Magyarized. Rallying with the Deák Party and then the Hungarian Liberals, he served two non-consecutive terms as Csákova deputy in the Diet of Hungary. In this context, he was noted for rejecting the notion that deputies were ethnic representatives, declaring himself a servant of the country as a whole. According to Gura Satului, this stance angered his uncle, who viewed György as incompetent. In 1867, intellectuals from the Principality of Romania began pushing for a reunified Dacia (or Greater Romania). The irredentist Transilvania Society, created that year, elected bishops Ivačković and Șaguna on its steering committee. From January 1865, both, alongside Andrei Mocioni, had been honorary members of a similar nationalist group, the Bucovina Society.

György Ivácskovics (pictured in 1865), Metropolitan Procopie's nephew, became a supporter of Magyarization

Șaguna died in June 1873, during which time Ivačković was absent from his diocese, curing his illness at a spa. It fell on his temporary replacement, Popasu, to convene the synod for elections at Sibiu. Ivačković eventually joined the assembly and headed the electoral commission, before renouncing this latter position to present himself as a candidate. On September 9, 1873, Ivačković became Metropolitan of Transylvania, the first to be elected under a new church constitution. He took 78 from 108 votes; Popasu, in second place, had 20. He was sworn in on September 10, and, on September 12, became intimate counsel of Franz Joseph, by virtue of his ecclesiastical office. He would later become a Knight of the Leopoldine Order and receive the Order of the Iron Crown, First Class.

In later years, abbot Iosif Goldiș accused Ivačković of simony, alleging that his election had been fixed by Babeș, his Arad protege. According to other accounts, Ivačković became Metropolitan by accident, simply by being the oldest viable candidate—albeit one described by contemporaries as a "powerless old man" or an "invalid". Pro-Hungarians in the synod accepted the principle of seniority, because it opened the way for their candidate, Miron Romanul, who was second-oldest among the prelates. Romanul's own protege, Slavici, provides a contrasting interpretation. He claims that several pro- and anti-Hungarian factions coalesced to prevent Bishop Miron being elected, and pushed Ivačković as a safe candidate.

For part of his reign in Sibiu, Ivačković was attracted into disputes surrounding the Diocese of Bukovina—located in Cisleithania, and populated by Romanians, Ukrainians, and Rusyns. In December 1873, Theophil Bendella, who vied for the office of Bukovina bishop and wanted to join it with the Transylvanian Metropolis, claimed that Ivačković supported him. In April 1874, Ivačković and Popasu together consecrated Theophil Bendella in Sibiu.

=== Patriarch of Karlovci ===
Metropolitan Prokopije only held the Metropolitan seat at Sibiu to July 1874, soon before taking up the post of Serbian Patriarch in Karlovci. This was the consequence of a political conflict between the new Hungarian administration and the Karlovci prelates. Following the death of Patriarch Samuilo Maširević in 1870, the liberal disciples of Svetozar Miletić began organizing and reforming the Serbian dioceses. Initially, the vote had gone to Arsenije Stojković, who was however vetoed by government. Ivačković's name was first brought up, as a compromise solution, by Jovan Subotić.

After a final attempt to elect Stojković, again blocked by the Hungarian supervisors, the Serbs responded by electing Ivačković on June 11. He took 56 votes, while the other remaining candidates, Emilijan Kengelac and Nikanor Grujić, only had 8 or 9 between them. Ivačković accepted and met "not even the slightest objection from the Hungarian cabinet", which "had no other way of backing out of an impasse". To this end, Ivačković reassured the Hungarian side that he would not also hold on to the seat of Sibiu. He moved to Karlovci (where he was confirmed on July 19) and announced on August 13 that the Sibiu seat was vacant. Part of the message read:

Romanian	English
[...] navalirea cu atât'a potere a tuturoru imprejuràriloru asupr'a mea, nu-mi lasá alta alegere, de càtu — o supunere cu resignatiune, in cea mai deplina buna-credintia, cà este spre binele santei nóstre biserice. Asia a fostu, pré iubitii mei, cà eu, desi cu inim'a plina de dorere si in consciintia celei mai grele responsabilitàti, a trebuitu sè me despartu de Voi, sè parasescu acelu terenu alu archipastoriei la pré-iubitulu meu poporu romanu, carui intr'unu cursu de 21 de ani tóte modestele mele poteri si ingrigiri au fostu devotate. M'am despartitu, V'am parasitu, — dar totusi numai corporalminte; spiritulu meu — pururiá va fi cu Voi, pururiá Ve voiu petrece cu iubire si cu tóta solicitudinea, ce mi-o impune legatur'a bisericesca si comuniunea sincera si intima a trecutului.	[...] overwhelmed by such powerful circumstances, I was left no other choice but to submit and resign, being deeply persuaded that this is for the good of our holy church. And so it was, dearly beloved, that I, albeit heavy-hearted with grief and fully aware of my most serious responsibility, have had to part with You, to discard my archpriesthood field among my most beloved Romanian people, to whom for 21 years I have devoted all my modest powers and care. I have parted with You, I have discarded You — but, to be sure, only with my body; my spirit — it will forever be with You, I will forever follow You with love and all my concern, as required by the bound of the church and by the sincere and intimate communion of the past.

Several Romanian commentators see Ivačković's move to Karlovci as a sample of Orthodox cooperation—described by historian Teodor Păcățian as a "laudable" gesture. The Mocionis' paper Albina also commented favorably, noting that the Serb synod showed its "trust of the Romanians", as well as a "penchant for church solidarity." Ivačković's renouncing of the Transylvanian office was still perceived as a betrayal by various other Romanian intellectuals. Some of these critics claimed that Babeș had again performed simony on Ivačković's behalf. At the time, Gura Satului published what it claimed was a found text reflecting the real feelings of Romanian parishioners. Criticizing Ivačković's choice and noting that he was a double-dealer, this piece also proclaimed: "We don't regret at all the loss of such a prelate, but quite the contrary, we rejoice having discarded a man of the past and an adversary of Romanian culture".

According to Slavici, the incident was an unwitting boon for Romanian nationalists, consolidating the supremacy of Romanian language and culture in its jurisdiction. Likewise, Russu-Șirianu contends that Ivačković's departure was "fortunate", ridding the Romanian church of someone "who could not hold service in Romanian, who did not understand our past and our aspirations; let alone stand up for those aspirations of ours".

Like Stojković, Ivačković proved himself sympathetic to the Serbs' liberal current. In accepting a return to the fold, he probably intended an amiable church reunification under a Karlovci primacy, but he was also could-shouldered by the Serb nationalists. The latter's conflict with the Hungarian Prime Minister, Kálmán Tisza, was only enhanced by the Great Eastern Crisis, which rekindled ethnic aspirations in the former Karlovci parishes. The Serbian church remained under the close watch of Hungarian officials, especially after Miletić was arrested in 1876; its synod was unable to meet in 1876–1878. The Tisza administration found backing in the Patriarch's nephew, György, who served as county head in Krassó. There, he engaged in protracted conflicts with the Mocionis and the Romanian National Party, being denounced as a "tyrant" and "tool of the government". Eventually reprimanded by his superiors, he died in 1878, while serving another term in the Diet.

The final months of Patriarch Ivačković's reign saw Karlovci being dragged into a dispute over the hierarchic inclusion of Orthodox parishes in Austrian-occupied Bosnia. In weighing in on the latter issue, Tisza asked Ivačković's advice.

=== Resignation and death ===
Ivačković remained in office until May 1879, when German Anđelić took over as suffragan. His formal resignation came in December, shortly after Ivačković made one final trip to Pest, and cited reasons of bad health. However, according to various reports, it had been pushed by the Hungarian government. According to Păcățian, Education Minister Ágoston Trefort colluded with Anđelić and threatened to have Ivačković committed, finally ordering to get him to sign a blank resignation. The circumstances of this act also caused an uproar among the Banatian Serbs and the other Serbs of Hungary. Miletić's followers read it as an attempt by Tisza to return Karlovci under the conservatives' control. They noted in particular that Ivačković had never mentioned his intentions before leaving for Pest, and were especially angered by his replacement with Anđelić, "regarded as the embodiment of pro-government clerical politics." In the Diet, deputy Miklós Maximovics requested that Tisza answer specific questions about the incident.

Before the end of 1879, the Hungarian authorities granted Ivačković a pension worth 24,000 forint. In early 1880, he donated the entire revenue collected on his patriarchal estates "to the Serb people". He withdrew to Dalj, in the Kingdom of Croatia-Slavonia, then to Bela Crkva, where he died in May 1881. His body was taken by rail to Socol, and by steamboat to Karlovci, being ultimately buried at the Karlovci Cathedral. One of his brothers, known as Matea Ivacicovici, continued to live in Bela Crkva, dying there in December 1885.

== Notes ==
Eastern Orthodox Church titles
Preceded by Gerasim Rac	Bishop of Arad; 1853–1873	Succeeded by Miron Romanul
Preceded by Andrei Șaguna	Metropolitan of Sibiu; 1873–1874	Succeeded by Miron Romanul
Preceded by Samuilo Maširević	Serbian Patriarch of Karlovci; 1874–1879	Succeeded by German Anđelić
