= German Anđelić =

Serbian Patriarch

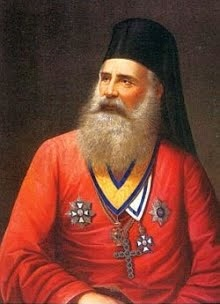
German Anđelić

German Anđelić (Serbian Cyrillic: Герман Анђелић; 1822–1888) was the Patriarch of Karlovci, the spiritual leader of Habsburg Serbs, from 1881 until his death in 1888.

== Biography ==
He was son of Pavle Anđelić, parish priest of the Cathedral of St. Nicholas in Sremski Karlovci, and his wife Ana. He graduated from the Karlovci Gymnasium and then the Clerical High School of Saint Arsenije. Then he went to Pest to study law and philosophy, which he graduated from Sárospatak. After obtaining the diploma of the law faculty, he passed the lawyer exam.

On 20 May 1848, he took monastic vow before the superior of the Krušedol Monastery, archimandrite Prokopije Ivačković. He joined the Grgeteg Monastery. In the same month, he was ordained deacon at the hands of the bishop of Upper Karlovac Evgenije Ivačković. Shortly thereafter, Patriarch of Karlovci Josif Rajačić directed him to serve in the Saint Spyridon Church in Trieste. In the letter justifying the choice of the young cleric, he pointed to his excellent knowledge of several languages (Church Slavonic, German, Hungarian and Latin). In Trieste deacon German Anđelić was also a teacher in a Serbian church school.

In 1850 he returned to Sremski Karlovci and took up the post of professor at the Clerical High School of Saint Arsenije where he remained for sixteen years. In 1853 he received the dignity of archdeacon and, in the same year, he became part of the consistory of Patriarchate of Karlovci. In 1861 he received the dignity of protosingel, and in 1864 became archimandrite. In the same year, he was appointed superior of the Grgeteg Monastery.

=== Bishop ===
In 1867, after the death of bishop Platon Atanacković, he became the administrator of the Eparchy of Bačka and then he was nominated bishop of the same eparchy. His chirotony to the episcopate, however, took place only seven years later, on 11 August 1874, performed by the Patriarch of Karlovci Prokopije Ivačković.

=== Patriarch of Karlovci ===
In 1879, Patriarch Prokopije was forced to leave office, and Bishop German was appointed administrator of Patriarchate of Karlovci until the election of a successor. The choice of administrator, imposed by the Emperor of Austria Franz Joseph I, was badly received by the clergy and the faithful of the Patriarchate. The appointment of Bishop German as the new Patriarch of Karlovci two years later was met with even greater dissatisfaction. The Serbian Orthodox Church Council chose another candidate, the bishop of Upper Karlovac Teofan Živković, but the Emperor refused to confirm his election and personally appointed Bishop German as the Patriarch, who in the vote on the Council obtained only 11 votes (against 53 votes cast for Bishop Teofan).

The circumstances under which Patriarch German took office meant that he did not gain popularity among the Serbian faithful until the end of his life, although he transferred substantial funds to Serbian cultural institutions, funded scholarships for Serbian students or financially supported poor Serbian families. Together with his brother Stevan, an Orthodox protopresbyter, he donated 162,500 Ft to expand the Karlovci Gymnasium.

Eastern Orthodox Church titles
Preceded by Prokopije Ivačković	Serbian Patriarch of Karlovci; 1881–1888	Succeeded by Georgije Branković
Preceded by Platon Atanacković	Bishop of Bačka; 1870–1881	Succeeded by Vasilijan Petrović
