= Romanian Church of the Holy Trinity =

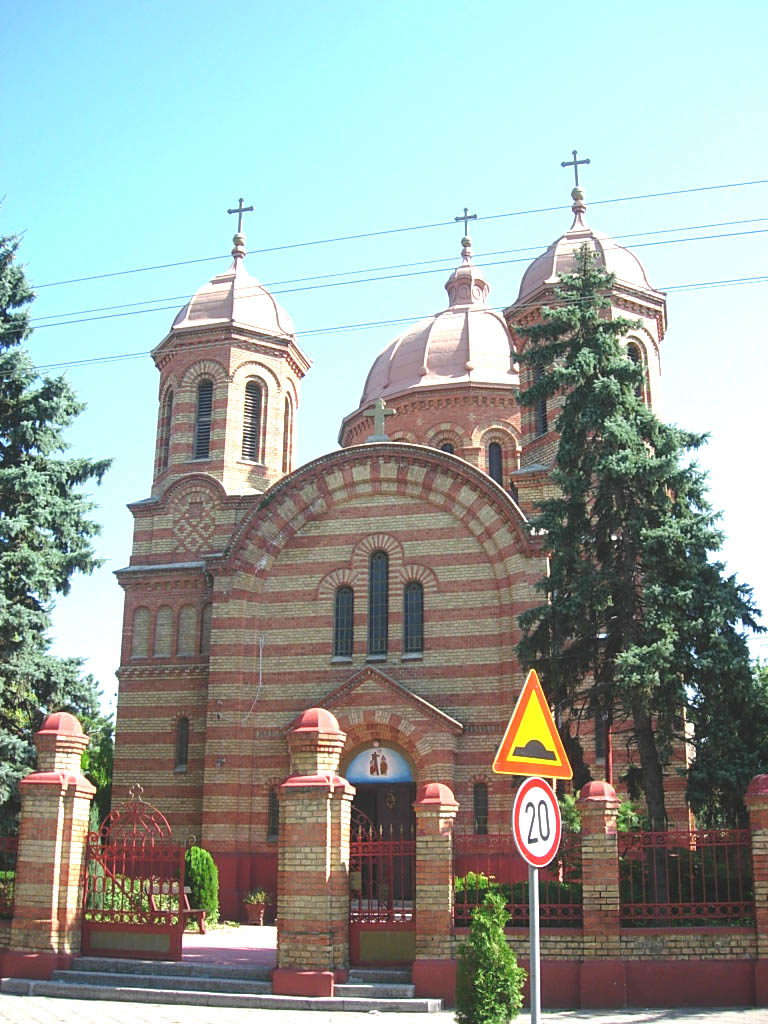
- Romanian Church of the Holy Trinity
- Romanian Church of the Holy Trinity
- Location: Deliblato (Romanian: Deliblata)
- Country: Serbia
- Denomination: Romanian Orthodox

Architecture
- Completed: 1925

The Romanian Church of the Holy Trinity (Serbian: Румунска црква Свете Тројице у Делиблату) is a church in Deliblato (Romanian: Deliblata), Serbia. It was built in 1925.
