= Deliblato =

Deliblato Делиблато Deliblata
- Village (Selo)
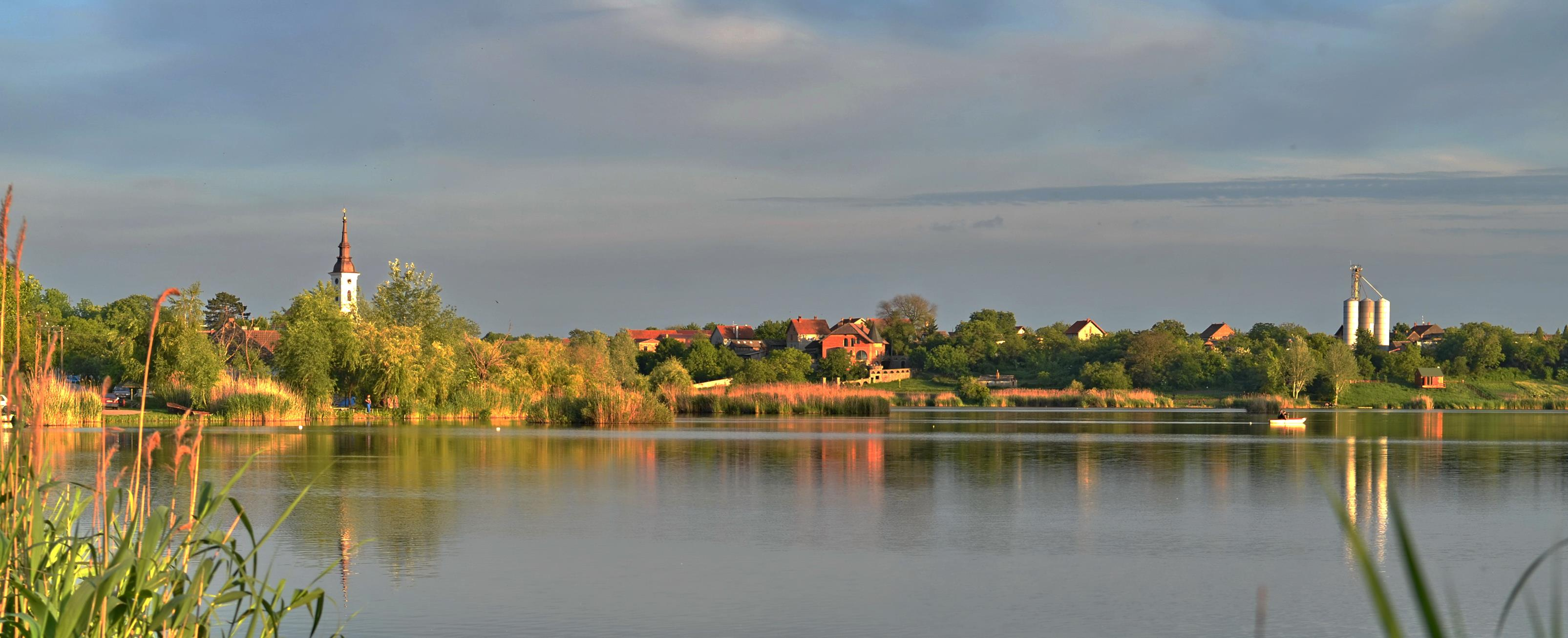
- Panorama of Deliblato

- Location of Deliblato within Serbia Deliblato (Serbia) Deliblato (Europe)
- Coordinates: 44°50′15″N 21°02′21″E
- Country: Serbia
- Province: Vojvodina
- District: South Banat
- Municipality: Kovin
- Elevation: 94 m (308 ft)

Population (2011)
  - Deliblato: 2,939
- Time zone: UTC+1 (CET)
  - Summer (DST): UTC+2 (CEST)
- Postal code: 26225
- Area code: +381(0)13
- Car plates: KO

Deliblato (Serbian Cyrillic: Делиблато; Romanian: Deliblata) is a village in Serbia, situated in the Kovin municipality in the Vojvodina province. The village has a total population of 3,498 (2002 census), with a Serb ethnic majority and a Romanian minority. The Deliblatska Peščara (Deliblato Sands), the largest sandy area in Europe, was named after this village.

== Name ==
The name of the village is derived from the Turkish word deli ("Mad") and Serbian word "blato" ("mud"), thus the full meaning in English would be "Mad mud". It is known as Deliblata in Romanian.

Deliblato received its name from its situation in the sandy area. According to one theory, the sandy area, in the vastness of the river Danube, became very muddy during long rain periods in ancient times. The road passing through the area had been easier to cross due to the mixing of mud and sand, thus travelers called this place Deliblato. Sloveni however, the notion of the lake marked by the word 'mud' and it is not excluded that the current village got its name from the large pond that lies around it.

== History ==
The village of Deliblato is first mentioned in 1660, during Ottoman rule, as being populated by ethnic Serbs. In 1761, it was recorded as an Orthodox Christian settlement. A Serbian church was built in 1783 and rebuilt in 1906.

Deliblato was the seat of government for reforestation Deliblatska pescara which officially began to work 1818. In past-war period Deliblato registered significant socio-political development. With developed agriculture and even with the beginnings of the development of manufacturing Deliblato is one of the most progressive villages in this part of Banat.

It is not certain when the village was founded. In 1660/6, during the Ottoman rule, the name Deliblato was mentioned in Patrijarsija Pecka which was claimed by the passers Mihajlo Dolovac and Zahija Nikola from Deliblato. During the first Serbian Migration under Patriarch Arsenije III Carnojevic in 1960s many people found their new homes in Deliblato. In 1761 the village was recorded as Orthodox Christian settlement with well-known families as Obzovicani. Er Cahi and Ritopecani. Serbian church was built in 1783 and rebuilt in 1906.

It is good to mention Lake Kraljevac which is next to the village. Today it attracts many visitors who are interested in fishing and nature relaxing. The fact that he is on the slopes of Deliblatska pescara and the proximity of the nature reserve Kraljevac gives Deliblato status tourist attraction for domestic and foreign tourists. In the village work Serbian and Romanian church and the common kudas of all residents is Spirits. According to national legislation the area around the village has the status of the Special Nature Reserve and Important Bird Area.

== Population and major ethnic groups ==
| Year | Total | Serbs | Romanians | Yugoslavs | Hungarians | Romani | Croats | Montenegrins | Other |
|---|---|---|---|---|---|---|---|---|---|
| 1991 | 3,722 | 74.2% | 17.35% | 4.00% | 1.85% | 0.80% | 0.37% | 0.29% | 0.69% |
| 2002 | 3,498 | 80.1% | 12.6% | 1.22% | 1.25% | 1.08% | 0.25% | 0.28% | 3.22% |

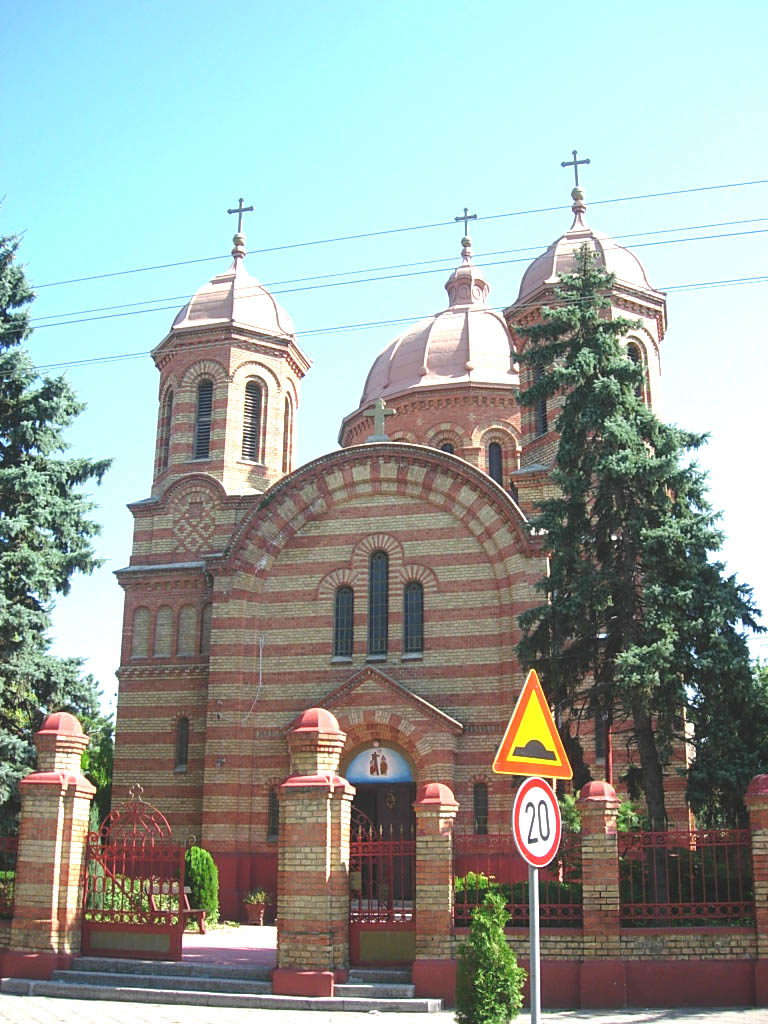
The Romanian Orthodox church

== Notable individuals ==
- Prokopije Ivačković

== See also ==
- Deliblatska Peščara
- List of places in Serbia
- List of cities, towns and villages in Vojvodina
