= Nikanor Grujić =

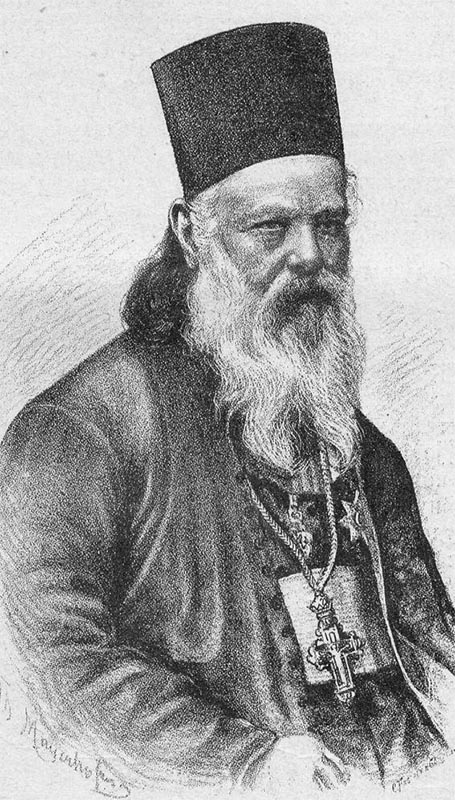
Portrait of Nikanor Grujić from 1887

Nikanor Grujić (Serbian Cyrillic: Никанор Грујић; December 12, 1810 – April 20, 1887) was the Serbian Orthodox bishop of Pakrac, the locum tenens Serbian Patriarch, the Austro–Hungarian emperor's Privy Councilor, knight of the Grand Cross of the Franz Joseph order, member of Houses of Magnates at Hungarian and Croatian–Slavonian parliaments, member of Serbian Learned Society, writer, poet, orator and translator.

== Biography ==
Born Milutin Grujić on December 12, 1810, or December 1 (Julian calendar) in Lippó (Lipova), Baranya county (then Austrian empire) to priest Prokopije Grujić and Agripina, née Kosić. He had an older brother named Dragutin Grujić, who later became archpriest of Mohács and Szigetvar, parish priest of Kácsfalu (Jagodnjak) and assessor of Buda bishopric consistory.

Milutin was educated at Lippó, his birthplace, Mohács and Pečuj, where he excelled as an orator and poet of his generation. He attended and successfully finished his theological studies at the prestigious Serbian Orthodox Seminary of Sremski Karlovci. After that, he took monastic vows and changed his name to Nikanor.

He played a prominent role in the proclamation of Serbian Vojvodina during the May Assembly in Sremski Karlovci in 1848. After Nikanor's speech, Stevan Šupljikac was proclaimed vojvoda of Serbian Vojvodina.

Later that year (1848), Grujić become archimandrite of Kuveždin monastery, and after that, archimandrite of Krušedol monastery. In 1859 he was an administrator of the Eparchy of upper Karlovac. His ordination as bishop took place in 1861, officiated by Patriarch Josif Rajačić. In 1864 Nikanor become the Serbian Orthodox Bishop of Pakrac.

He was appointed administrator of Serbian patriarchy – metropolitanate (locum tenens patriarch) by emperor Franz Joseph I of Austria in 1872. That same year the emperor named him to his privy council, better known as the Wirklicher Geheimrat), with the title of Excellency. In 1874, Grujić become a knight of the Grand Cross (Grosskreuz) of the Order of Franz Joseph. At the same time he ended his administrator's duty in the Serbian patriarchy – metropolitanate.

== Works ==
Nikanor Grujić was also a well-known poet, writer, translator and orator. Among his most notable books are: The Epic of Saint Sabbas (Sveti Sava); Objections of Nikanor Grujić, a linguistic work about Vuk Karadžić`s translation of the New Testament; and Grujić's Autobiography. He was a member of the Serbian Learned Society (Srpsko učeno društvo), which later became the Serbian Academy of Sciences and Arts, and honorary member of Matica slovenská.

Bishop Nikanor died on 26 April 1887 at his court in Pakrac and was buried near the Serbian Orthodox Church at Gavrinica, Pakrac cemetery.

== Bibliography ==
Bishop Nikanor wrote large number of poems, texts and books. Among them, there are:

- "Objections of Nikanor Grujić...", Zemun 1852. (in Serbian: Primetve Nikanora Grujića...)
- "Saint Sabbas", (Sremski) Karlovci 1861. (in Serbian: Sveti Sava)
- "Autobiography", Sremski Karlovci 1907. (in Serbian: Avtobiografija)

== See also ==
- Serbian Vojvodina
- Geheimrat
- Order of Franz Joseph
- Serbian Academy of Sciences and Arts
- Matica slovenská

== Sources ==
- Jovan Skerlić, Istorija nove srpske književnosti (Belgrade, 1921), pages 196–198.

Eastern Orthodox Church titles
| Preceded by Stefan Kragujević | Bishop of Pakrac; 1861—1887 | Succeeded by Miron Nikolić |
