= Lukijan Bogdanović =

Serbian Patriarch

His Holiness Lukijan
- Archbishop of Karlovci and Serbian Patriarch
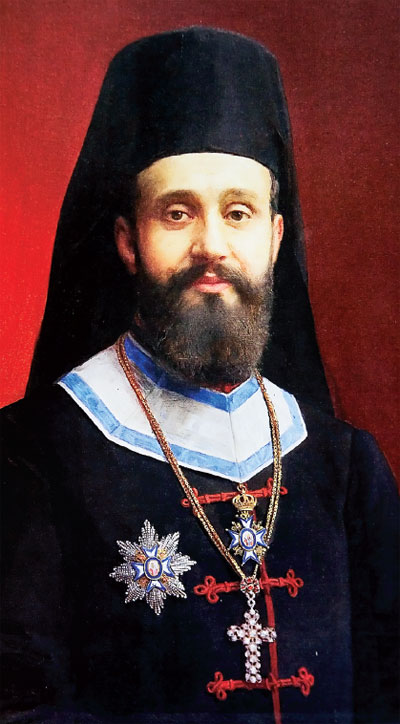
- Church: Serbian Orthodox Church
- Installed: 1908
- Term ended: 1913
- Predecessor: Georgije Branković
- Successor: Administration

Personal details
- Born: Lazar Bogdanović; 10 May 1867 Baja, Austria-Hungary
- Died: 1 September 1913 (aged 46) Bad Gastein, Austria-Hungary
- Buried: Sremski Karlovci
- Denomination: Serbian Orthodox Church

Lukijan Bogdanović (Serbian Cyrillic: Лукијан Богдановић; Hungarian: Bogdanovics Lucián; 10 May 1867 – 1 September 1913) was the last Orthodox Patriarch of the Patriarchate of Karlovci and Metropolitanate of Karlovci. He was assassinated and decapitated while walking alone along a river bank in Bad Gastein. He was a prominent benefactor and member of Privrednik.

== Biography ==
Lukijan Bogdanović was born as Lazar Bogdanović in 1867 in Baja. His father Aleksandar was born in Pécsvárad, a town in Baranya County, but he moved his trade business to Baja where he had his small store. Lazar's mother Milica née Letić was related to Georgije Branković, who became the Serbian Patriarch of Karlovci. Lazar went to school in Baja, Sremski Karlovci, and Eger. At the Eszterházy Károly University in Eger, he studied law and went to the seminary to train for the priesthood.

In 1891 Lazar took the name of Lukijan when he was tonsured as a monk according to the tenets of the Serbian Orthodox Church. Shortly after he was elevated to archimandrite of the Beočin monastery. In 1892 he was named Bishop of the Eparchy of Buda in Budapest. On 22 September 1908 when his mother's kin Patriarch Georgije (Branković) died, Lukijan was elected to the post of Serbian Patriarch with see at Sremski Karlovci.

He immediately undertook several important measures to reform the economy and administration of numerous monasteries in the Karlovci Metropolitanate as well as to improve the educational level of monks by opening monastic schools.

In the early twentieth century, Patriarch Lukijan was viewed by Hungarian and Austrian authorities as more of a political than a religious figure. This was perhaps common among all newly independent Balkan states where, as a rule, the church came to be seen primarily as a nationalizing and patriotic force.

Serbs and other Orthodox Slavs constituted the largest demographic group within Bosnia and Herzegovina (they were under the jurisdiction of the Metropolitanate of Dabar-Bosnia independent by the Patriarch of Karlovci) and the portion of the former Militärgrenze (Military Frontier) that ran from Dalmatian hinterland through Croatia, Slavonia and Vojvodina. Serb successes during the Balkan Wars of 1912 and 1913 had a significant impact on both Hungarians and Austrians alike. István Tisza became prime minister of Hungary for the second time on 10 June 1913. During this period of the Second Balkan War waged between Bulgaria and Serbia, he wanted to solidify the government by suspending the Serbian Orthodox Church's autonomy and Church Council at the Metropolitanate of Karlovci, then within the Hungarian crown lands.

He was awarded the Order of Saint Sava.

== Death ==
Patriarch Lukijan went to Bad Gastein to seek redress but was murdered. His headless body was found floating in a river on 1 September 1913. The killers of the patriarch were never found or brought to justice because World War I soon broke out and four years later the Habsburg Empire dissolved.

== See also ==
- List of unsolved murders (1900–1979)

Eastern Orthodox Church titles
Preceded by Georgije Branković	Serbian Patriarch of Karlovci; 1908–1913	Vacant Title next held by Dimitrije as Serbian Patriarch
Preceded by Jeremija Mađarević	Bishop of Buda; 1897–1908	Succeeded by Georgije Zubković
