= Samuilo Maširević =

Serbian Patriarch

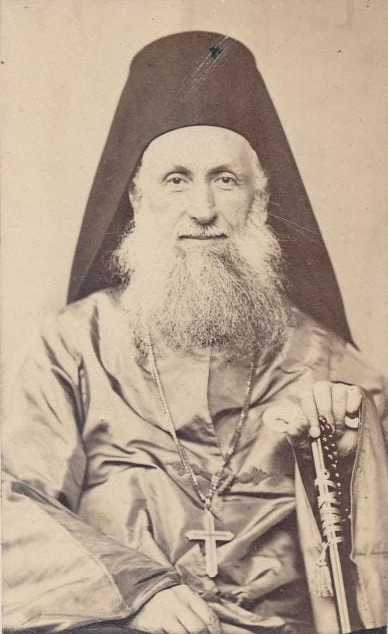
Samuilo Maširević

Samuilo Maširević (Serbian Cyrillic: Самуило Маширевић; 1804–1870) was the Patriarch of Karlovci, the spiritual leader of Habsburg Serbs, from 1864 until his death in 1870.

== Biography ==
He graduated from the gymnasium and seminary, and studied legal science as well. At the age of twenty-three, he entered the Krušedol Monastery, and took monastic vow before the superior, archimandrite Dimitrije Krestić.

In the following years he served as archdeacon, he was also a lecturer of the seminary in Vršac, then he was granted the dignity of archimandrite and became the head of the monasteries of St. George and Bezdin, on the Eparchy of Buda. He received the episcopal nomination on 30 October 1852, and on 8 May 1858, he was ordained bishop of Temišvar.

He was administrator of the Patriarchate of Karlovci after the death of Patriarch Josif Rajačić in 1864, then the Serbian Orthodox Church Council elected him to succeed Rajačić as the Patriarch of Karlovci. In 1865, at the time when he served as the Patriarch, the Archdiocese of Arad, which included ethnically Romanian Orthodox parishes in Transylvania, separated from the Patriarchate of Karlovci. He died in 1870 and was buried in the Cathedral of St. Nicholas in Sremski Karlovci.

Eastern Orthodox Church titles
Preceded by Josif Rajačić	Serbian Patriarch of Karlovci; 1864–1870	Succeeded by Prokopije Ivačković
Preceded by Pantelejmon Živković	Bishop of Temišvar; 1853–1864	Succeeded by Antonije Nako
