= Library of the Eparchy of Slavonia =

- Библиотека Епархије славонске Knjižnica Eparhije slavonske
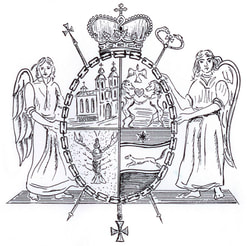
- Location: Pakrac, Croatia

Access and use
- Access requirements: Open to general public

Other information
- Website: Official website

The Library of the Eparchy of Slavonia (Serbian: Библиотека Епархије славонске, Croatian: Knjižnica Eparhije slavonske), also known as the Pakrac's Library (Serbian: Пакрачка библиотека, Croatian: Pakračka knjižnica) and abbreviated as PEP, is a cultural and historical institution of the Eparchy of Slavonia with a history of approximately 250 years.

It is recognized as one of the most significant Serbian Orthodox Church libraries alongside those at the Hilandar Monastery and the Patriarchate of Belgrade. The library contains over 20,000 volumes. It is notable for its collection of early printed South Slavic books, making it the second-largest collection of its kind in the world. The oldest item in the library is a 1497 edition of Vergil’s works in Latin, acquired with support from the Government of Republika Srpska.

== History ==
The library was established by orthodox bishop Kiril Živković and is today one of the oldest Serb cultural institutions in Croatia.

During the Croatian War of Independence in 1990s in SAO Western Slavonia the library was at risk of destruction by Croatian forces. The library was relocated twice in that period, with significant portions of its collection saved by Croatian officer Ivan Hiti from Varaždin. He transported the collection to the National and University Library in Zagreb. For this act, Hiti was awarded the Order of Saint Constantine by the Serbian Patriarch in 2013. The library's collection, which includes many books and manuscripts, is now protected by the state due to its historical significance.

After the end of the war library is undergoing a transformation to become a specialized academic institution and research centre. Unlike a traditional lending library, it will primarily serve as a repository for research, focusing on providing access to its collections for scholarly study.

In 2023 the University of Banja Luka and the Eparchy of Slavonia have established a partnership to advance research related to the library's collections. This collaboration is expected to enhance academic access to and utilization of the library's resources.

== See also ==
- Central Library of Serbs of Croatia
- Archives of Serbs in Croatia
