= Jasenovac Monastery =

Serbian Orthodox monastery in Jasenovac, Croatia

Coordinates: 45°16′18.1″N 16°54′42.8″E

- Манастир Јасеновац; Manastir Jasenovac
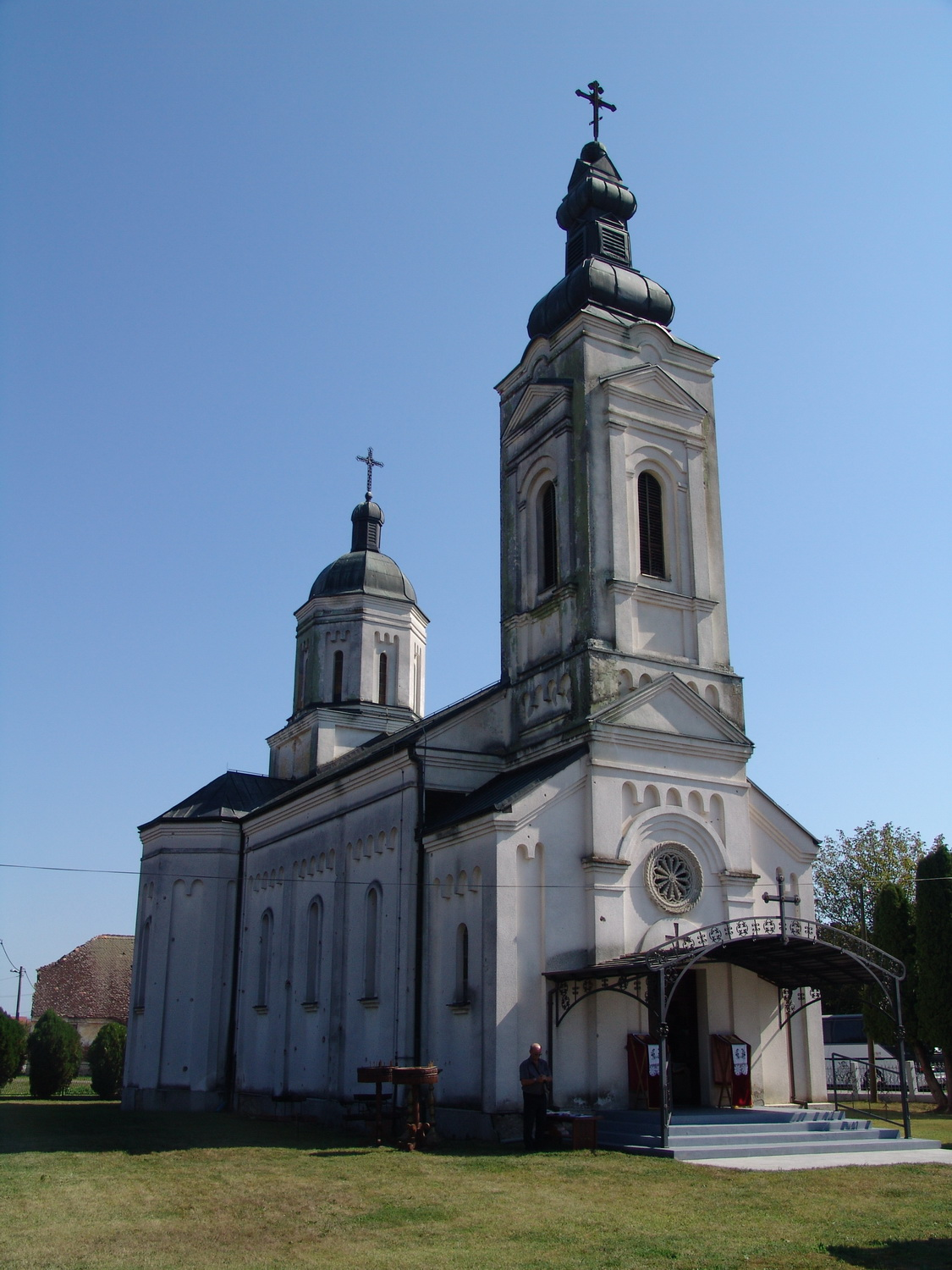
- Jasenovac Monastery
- Country: Croatia
- Denomination: Serbian Orthodox Church

Architecture
- Years built: 18th century

The Jasenovac Monastery (Serbian: Манастир Јасеновац, Croatian: Manastir Jasenovac) is a Serbian Orthodox monastery dedicated to the Nativity of St. John the Baptist. It is the seat of the Eparchy of Slavonia.

== History ==
The Monastery was built in 1775.

During the beginning of WWII, the monastery was destroyed.

The monastery was restored and consecrated on September 2, 1984.

During Croatian War of Independence, the church was partially damaged in 1991 and in 1995 was desecrated and destroyed.

In 2000, the church was restored and by then the Bishop of Slavonia Sava Jurić proclaimed the Jasenovac Church of the Nativity Theotokos and St. John the Baptist as monastery.

The abbot of this monastery was Amfilohije Zivkovic.

== Gallery ==
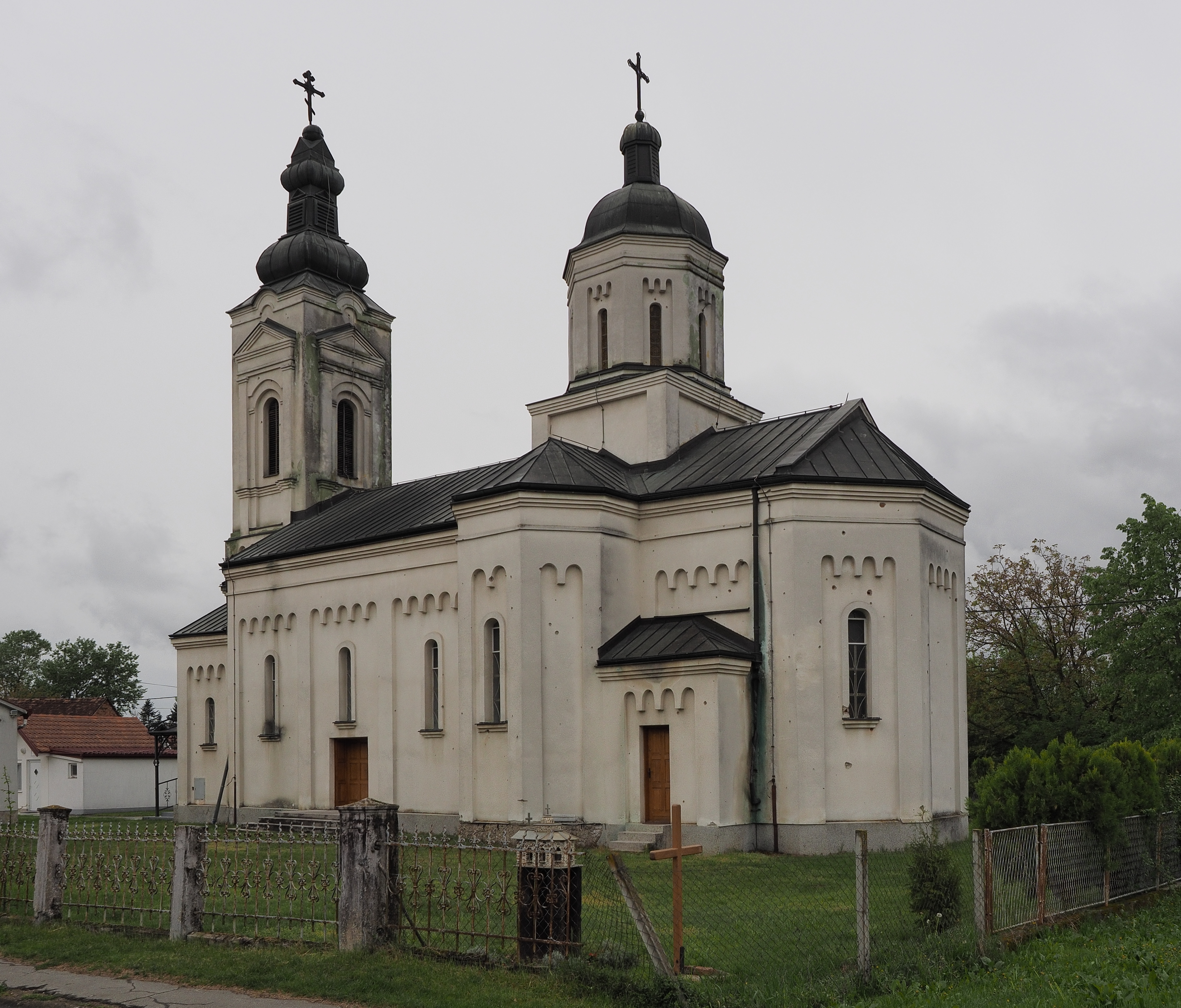

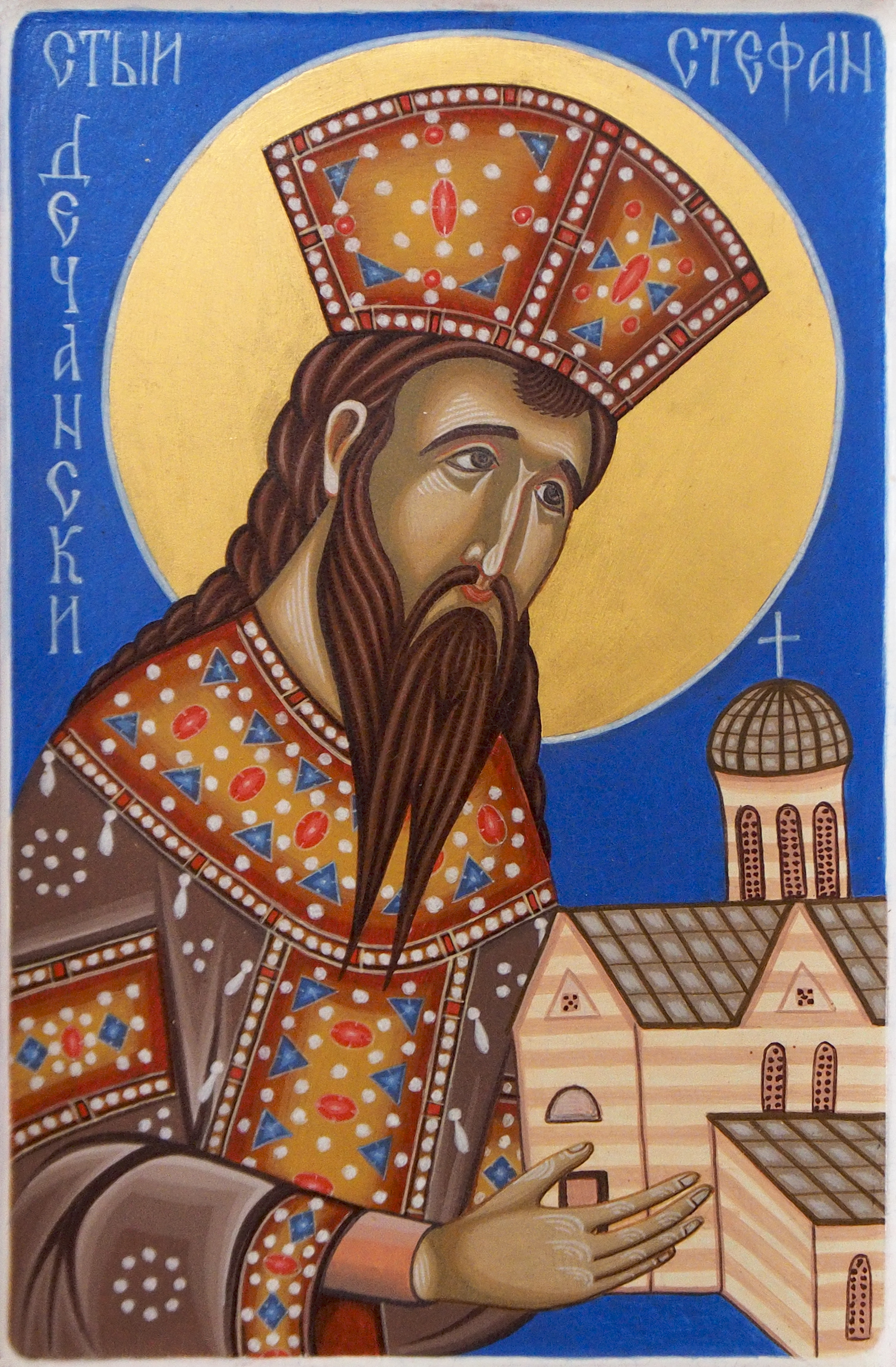

== See also ==
- List of Serbian Orthodox monasteries
