= Teofan Živković =

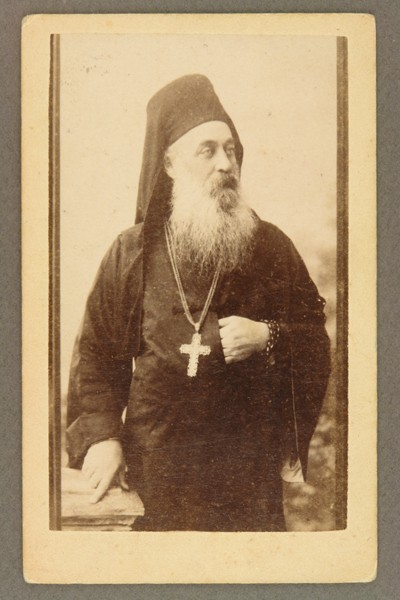
Теофан Живковић

Teofan Živković also spelled Theophan Živković (Secular name Božidar; Sremski Karlovci, 1825 - Plaški, 21 November 1890) was the Bishop of the Serbian Orthodox Eparchy of Gornji Karlovac from 1874 to 1890.

== Youth and education ==
Božidar Živković was born in Sremski Karlovci in 1825. His father was a doctor. He graduated from Karlovci Gymnasium in Sremski Karlovci, and theology in Szeged. He also studied law at Belgrade's Velika škola, and later completed his studies at the Faculty of Theology at Grandes écoles of Saint Arsenije Sremac at Sremski Karlovci.

Upon graduation, he became a professor at a Teacher's Academy in Sombor. Later, he accepted the post of rector of the Faculty of Theology at his alma mater in Sremski Karlovci.

== Monasticism and Episcopacy ==
Božidar Živković was tonsured as a monk in 1853 and adopted the monastic name of Teofan. Immediately after entering monasticism, he was promoted to deacon. Already by 1858, he became an archdeacon, in 1864; a hieromonkl; and in 1866, elevated to archimandrite.

As an archimandrite, Teofan published his book "The Serbian National Church in Timișoara" in 1868.

In 1874, Teofan Živković was elected Bishop of Upper Karlovac. He was known as a good preacher and travelled throughout his diocese preaching faith to the people. In 1892, his sermons were printed in Karlovac in a collection called "The Preacher.," collected by Manojlo Grbić.

In 1881, the Church-People's Committee elected Teofan Živković as the Patriarch of Karlovac. There were 53 votes in favour of Teofan, while there were only 11 against. However, the Austro-Hungarian court did not want to confirm his election as patriarch.

Bishop Teofan's speech in 1881 played a role in calming down the great expectations of uniting the Serbian National Church with that of the Roman Catholic Church in Croatia by Pope Leo XIII, his apostolic commissioner Josip Stadler and politician Josip Juraj Strossmayer during the politically volatile period of the 1880s when anything could have happened? Also, Bishop Teofan was supported by Serbian Orthodox Bishops Stefan (Knezević) of Dalmatia and Gerasim Petranović of Montenegro.

== Death ==
He suffered from pulmonary disease and died in Plaški in 1890. He was buried at a Cemetery in Plaški.

Bishop Teofan's grave at the Plaški Cemetery was defiled in March 2013. A hole about 1.5 meters deep was dug at his grave, and municipal authorities did not allow it to be determined whether the remains were taken out of the grave or not.
