= Eparchy of Slavonia =

Diocese of the Serbian Orthodox Church

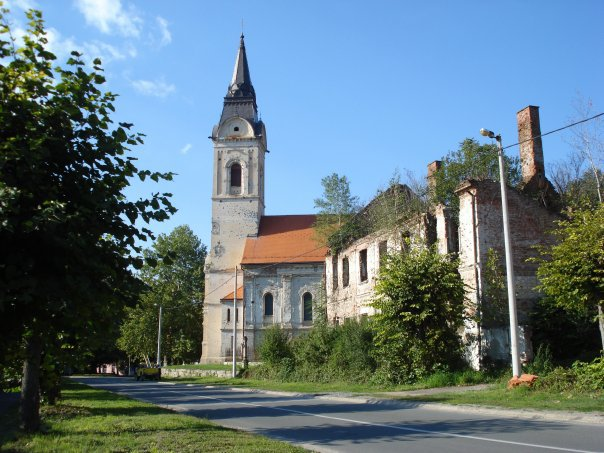
- Holy Trinity Cathedral, Pakrac

Location
- Territory: western and central Slavonia
- Headquarters: Jasenovac Monastery, Jasenovac, Croatia

Information
- Denomination: Eastern Orthodox
- Sui iuris church: Serbian Orthodox Church
- Established: 1557
- Cathedral: Holy Trinity Cathedral, Pakrac
- Language: Church Slavonic, Serbian

Current leadership
- Bishop: Jovan Ćulibrk

Map

Website
- Eparchy of Slavonia

Eparchy of Slavonia (Serbian: Епархија славонска; Croatian: Eparhija slavonska) is a diocese (eparchy) of the Serbian Orthodox Church covering western and central parts of Slavonia region in Croatia.

The episcopal see is located at the Holy Trinity Cathedral, Pakrac. Its headquarters and bishop's residence are located at Jasenovac Monastery in Jasenovac.

== History ==
During the Middle Ages, the Banate of Slavonia was under the rule of Hungarian kings. By the 15th century, some eastern regions of Slavonia were settled by Serbs, who came there after fleeing Bosnia, even before the Ottoman conquest in 1463. Since Serbs were Eastern Orthodox Christians, some tensions occurred with local Catholic Church. In 1438, pope Eugene IV (1431–1447) sent the inquisitor Giacomo della Marca to Slavonia as a missionary, with instruction to convert "schismatic" Serbs to "Roman religion", and if that should fail, to banish them. During that period, Serb nobility was also present in the region. In 1454, Serbian Orthodox liturgical book, the Varaždin Apostol was written in Varaždin, for princess Katarina Branković of Serbia, wife of Ulrich II, Count of Celje.

In the first half of the 16th century, entire [lSlavonia was devastated by frequent wars. Serbian despot Pavle Bakić fell at the Battle of Gorjani in Slavonia (1537), defending the region from the Ottomans. By that time, eastern part known as Lower Slavonia was conquered by the Ottomans, while the western part (known as Upper Slavonia) came under the Habsburg rule. Since the renewal of the Serbian Patriarchate of Peć in 1557, the Orthodox Serbs of Lower Slavonia were placed under jurisdiction of the Eparchy of Požega, with seat at the Orahovica Monastery. In 1595, Serbian Orthodox metropolitan Vasilije of Požega moved to Upper Slavonia, under Habsburg rule, in order to avoid the Ottoman oppression.

Historically, the eparchy was known as Eparchy of Požega in 16th and 17th century, and later as Eparchy of Pakrac. During 18th and 19th century, it was under jurisdiction of the Serbian Orthodox Metropolitanate of Karlovci, that became in 1848 the Patriarchate of Karlovci.

After World War I and the creation of the Kingdom of Yugoslavia, the eparchy was united with other Serbian ecclesiastical provinces to form the unified Serbian Orthodox Church, a process completed in 1920.

During the World War II (1941-1945) and the Croatian War of Independence (1991-1995), the territory of this eparchy was greatly affected.

== List of bishops ==
=== Bishops of Požega ===
- Josif (around 1585)
- Vasilije (around 1590–1595)
- Sofronije (during 16th or 17th century)
- Grigorije (during 16th or 17th century)
- Stefan (around 1641)

=== Bishops of Pakrac ===
- Sofronije Podgoričanin (1705–1710)
- Vasilije Rajić (1710–1714)
- Gavrilo Popović (1715–1716)
- Atanasije Radošević (1717–1720)
- Nikifor Stefanović (1721–1743)
- Sofronije Jovanović (1743–1757)
- Vićentije Jovanović Vidak (administrator) (1757–1759)
- Arsenije Radivojević (1759–1769)
- Atanasije Živković (1770–1781)
- Josif Jovanović Šakabenta (1781–1783)
- Pavle Avakumović (178?-1786)
- Kiril Živković (1786–1807)
- Josif Putnik (1808–1828)
- Georgije Hranislav (1829–1839)
- Stefan Popović (1839–1843)
- Stefan Kragujević (1843–1864)
- Nikanor Grujić (1864–1887)
- Miron Nikolić (1890–1941)
- Damaskin Grdanički (administrator) (1945–1951)

=== Bishops of Slavonia ===
- Emilijan Marinović (1952–1981)
- Lukijan Pantelić (1985–1999)
- Sava Jurić (1999–2013)
- Jovan Ćulibrk (2014–present)

== Notable monasteries ==
- Jasenovac
- Orahovica

== Gallery ==
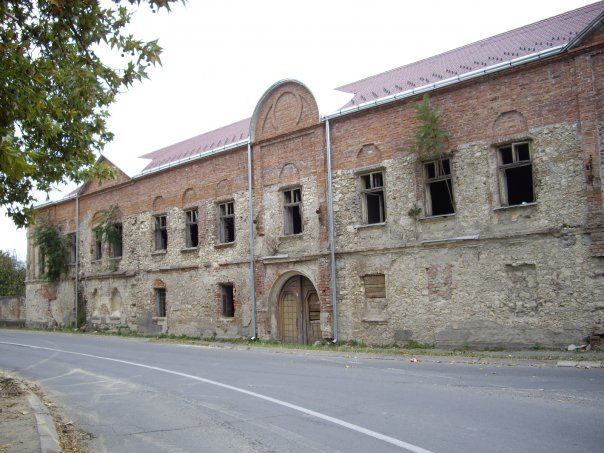
Bishop's Residence in Pakrac, devastated during the Croatian War of Independence

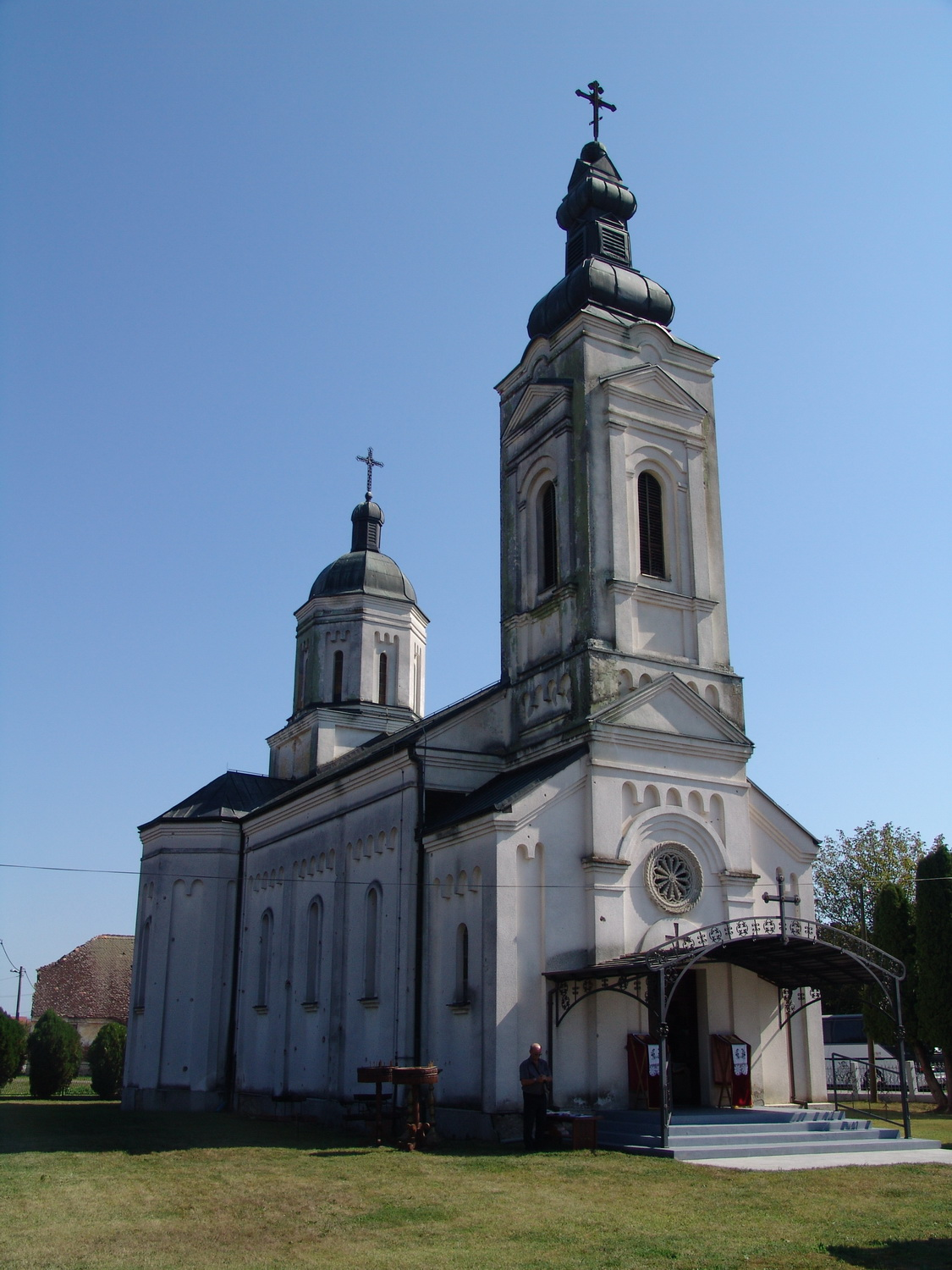
Jasenovac Monastery

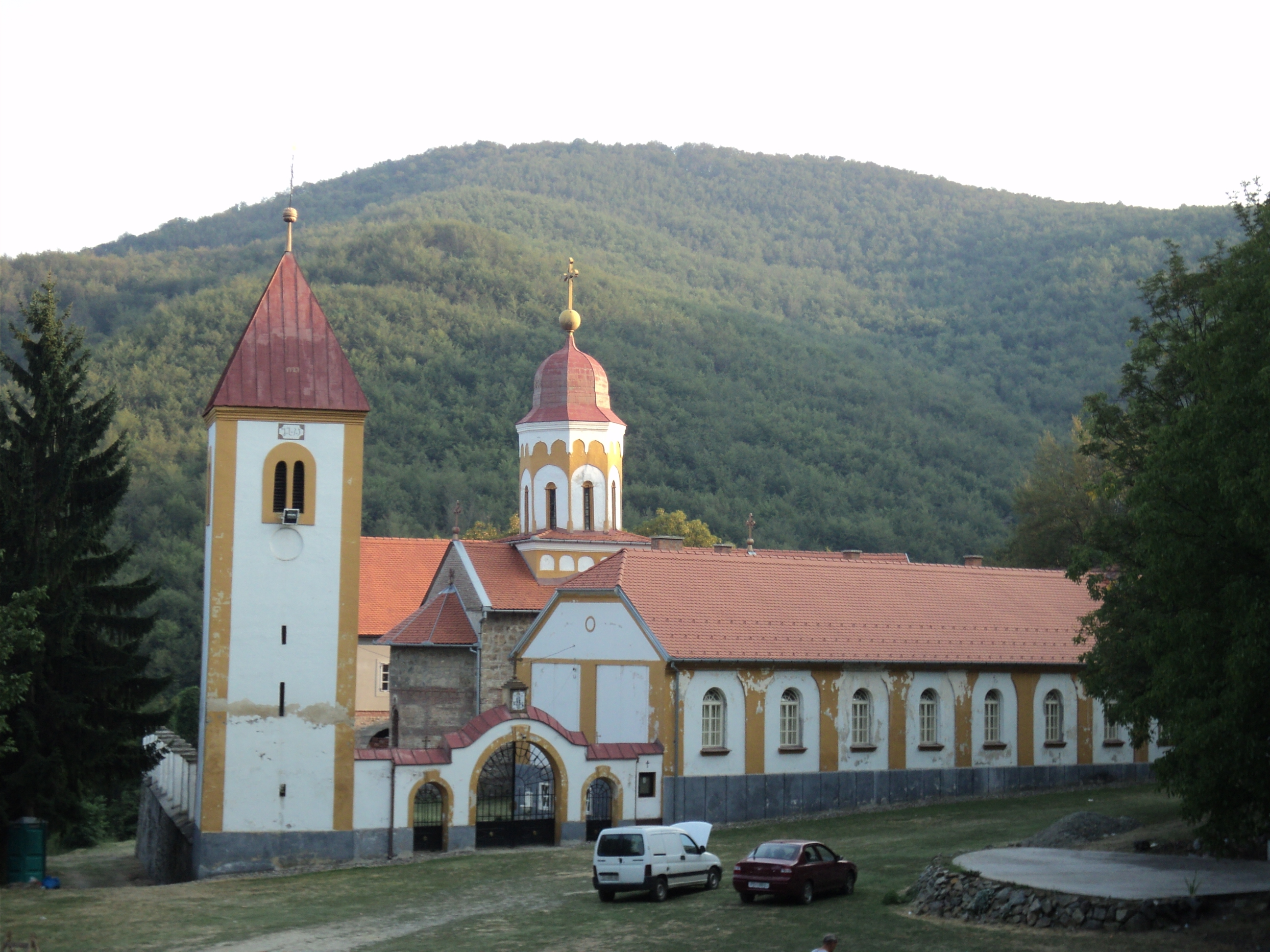
Orahovica Monastery

== See also ==
- Eastern Orthodoxy in Croatia
- Eparchies and metropolitanates of the Serbian Orthodox Church
- Serbs of Croatia
- Library of the Eparchy of Slavonia

== Sources ==
- Bataković, Dušan T., ed. (2005). Histoire du peuple serbe [History of the Serbian People] (in French). Lausanne: L’Age d’Homme. ISBN 978-2-8251-1958-7.
- Ćirković, Sima (2004). The Serbs. Malden: Blackwell Publishing. ISBN 978-1-4051-4291-5.
- Dabić, Vojin S., ed. (1998). Persecution of Serbs and Ethnic Cleansing in Croatia 1991-1998: Documents and Testimonies. Belgrade: Serbian Council Information Center.
- Gavrilović, Slavko (1993). "Serbs in Hungary, Slavonia and Croatia in struggles against the Turks (15th–18th centuries)". Serbs in European Civilization. Belgrade: Nova, Serbian Academy of Sciences and Arts, Institute for Balkan Studies. pp. 41–54. ISBN 978-86-7583-015-3.
- Krestić, Vasilije (1997). History of the Serbs in Croatia and Slavonia 1848-1914. Belgrade: BIGZ. ISBN 978-86-13-00888-0.
- Lajić, Ivan; Bara, Mario (2010). "Effects of the War in Croatia 1991-1995 on Changes in the Share of Ethnic Serbs in the Ethnic Composition of Slavonia". Stanovništvo. 48 (1): 49–73. doi:10.2298/STNV1001049L.
- Mileusnić, Slobodan (1997). Spiritual Genocide: A survey of destroyed, damaged and desecrated churches, monasteries and other church buildings during the war 1991–1995 (1997). Belgrade: Museum of the Serbian Orthodox Church.
- Miller, Nicholas J. (1997). Between Nation and State: Serbian Politics in Croatia Before the First World War. Pittsburgh: University of Pittsburgh Press. ISBN 978-0-8229-3989-4.
- Pavlović, Jovan, ed. (1992). Serbian Orthodox Church: Its past and present. Vol. 8. Belgrade: Serbian Orthodox Church.
- Sotirović, Vladislav B. (2011). "The Serbian Patriarchate of Peć in the Ottoman Empire: The First Phase (1557–94)" (PDF). Serbian Studies. 25 (2): 143–169. doi:10.1353/ser.2011.0038. Archived from the original (PDF) on 10 August 2016.
- Točanac-Radović, Isidora (2022). "The Great Migration of Serbs and the Question of the Serbian Ethnic and Religious Community in the Habsburg Monarchy". Migrations in the Slavic Cultural Space: From the Middle Ages to the Present Day. Łódź: Łódź University Press. pp. 15–27. ISBN 978-83-8331-033-6.
