= Bobovište, Bar =

Bobovište Бобовиште Boboshti
- Village
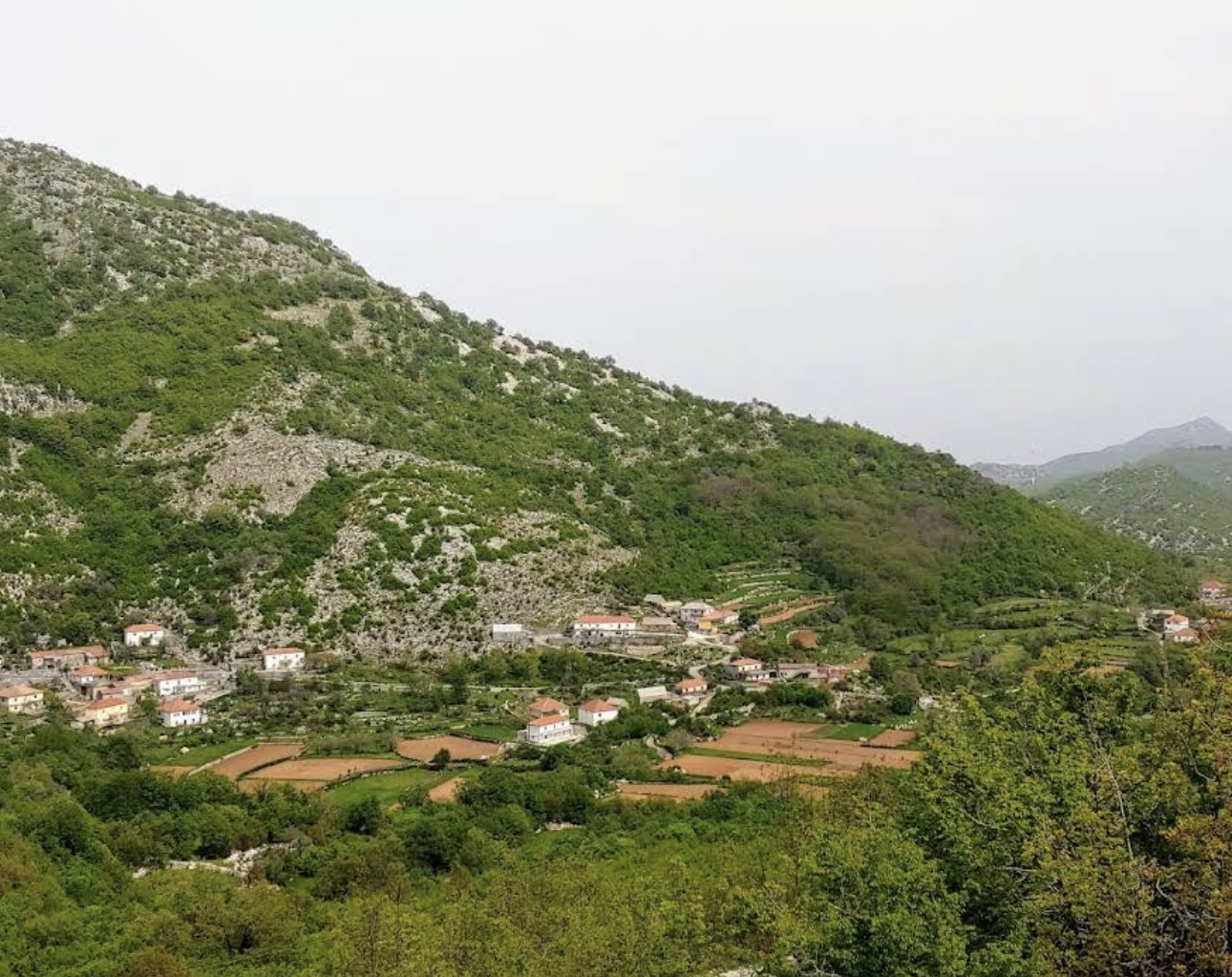

- Location within Montenegro
- Coordinates: 42.116729°N 19.270461°E
- Country: Montenegro
- Municipality: Bar

Population (2011)
  - Total: 180
- Time zone: UTC+1 (CET)
  - Summer (DST): UTC+2 (CEST)

Bobovište (Montenegrin and Serbian Cyrillic: Бобовиште; Albanian: Boboshti) is a village in Bar Municipality, in southeastern Montenegro. It lies on the western bank of Lake Skadar, in a geographical region known as Skadarska Krajina. It is inhabited by ethnic Albanians.

== History ==
Prior to the village population's conversion to Islam, they had used the nearby Moračnik Monastery as their church. In 1894, while Branislav Nušić travelled here, he noted that the village was Muslim.

== Demographics ==
As of 2003 the village had a population of 230.

According to the 2011 census, its population was 180. All of the inhabitants are Sunni Muslim and Albanian. The average age of the population is 43.1. A major fallout in the population has been due to young people emigrating to western countries such as USA, Switzerland and Australia etc. A large majority of people from Bobovište emigrated to especially USA. The Albanians of this village speak in the Gheg dialect of the Albanian language.

Ethnicity in 2011
Ethnicity	Number	Percentage
Albanians	180	100.0%
Total	180	100%
