= Patriarchate of Karlovci =

Former patriarchate of the Eastern Orthodox Church

Location
- Territory: Habsburg monarchy
- Headquarters: Karlovci, Habsburg monarchy (modern-day Sremski Karlovci, Serbia)

Information
- Denomination: Eastern Orthodox
- Sui iuris church: Self-governing Eastern Orthodox Patriarchate
- Established: 1848
- Dissolved: 1920
- Language: Church Slavonic, Serbian, Greek, Hungarian, Romanian (before 1865)

The Patriarchate of Karlovci (Serbian: Карловачка патријаршија, romanized: Karlovačka patrijaršija) or Serbian Patriarchate of Sremski Karlovci (Serbian: Српска патријаршија у Сремским Карловцима, romanized: Srpska patrijaršija u Sremskim Karlovcima), was a patriarchate of the Eastern Orthodox Church that existed between 1848 and 1920. It was established when the Metropolitanate of Karlovci was elevated to the rank of patriarchate. The Patriarchate of Karlovci nominally existed until 1920, when along with several other Eastern Orthodox jurisdictions in the defunct Austro-Hungarian Empire, as well as the Metropolitanate of Montenegro, it was merged with the Metropolitanate of Belgrade to form the unified Serbian Orthodox Church.

== History ==
At the May Assembly in Sremski Karlovci in 1848, prior to the Serb uprising of 1848–49, the Serbs of the Habsburg monarchy proclaimed the creation of the Serbian Vojvodina, a Serb autonomous region within the Monarchy. The metropolitan of Karlovci, Josif Rajačić, was also proclaimed "Serbian Patriarch", thus the Metropolitanate of Karlovci became a Patriarchate. The title of "Serbian Patriarch" given to Rajačić was confirmed by the Emperor Franz Joseph I the same year.

This confirmation of Rajačić as the Serbian Patriarch, and Stevan Šupljikac as Vojvoda, was a political move made by Emperor Franz Joseph I. He was confronted with revolution in his country and had difficulties subduing the Hungarians under Kossuth. Šupljikac and his Croatian counterpart, Josip Jelačić supported the Emperor against the Hungarians.

The position of Serbian Church and Serbs in the Habsburg monarchy was regulated by reforms brought about first by Empress Maria Theresa and later by Emperor Joseph II. The Serbian Church-Public Council of 1769 regulated the Serbs and their Church status in a special paper named "Regulament" and, later, in the "Declaratory Rescript of the Illyrian Nation" issued by Maria Theresa in 1779. These acts regulated the life of the Metropolitanate of Karlovci until 1868. Emperor Franz Joseph I published a special edict regulating Serbian Orthodox Church affairs and his edict was in force until the unification of Serbian Orthodox jurisdictions in 1920.

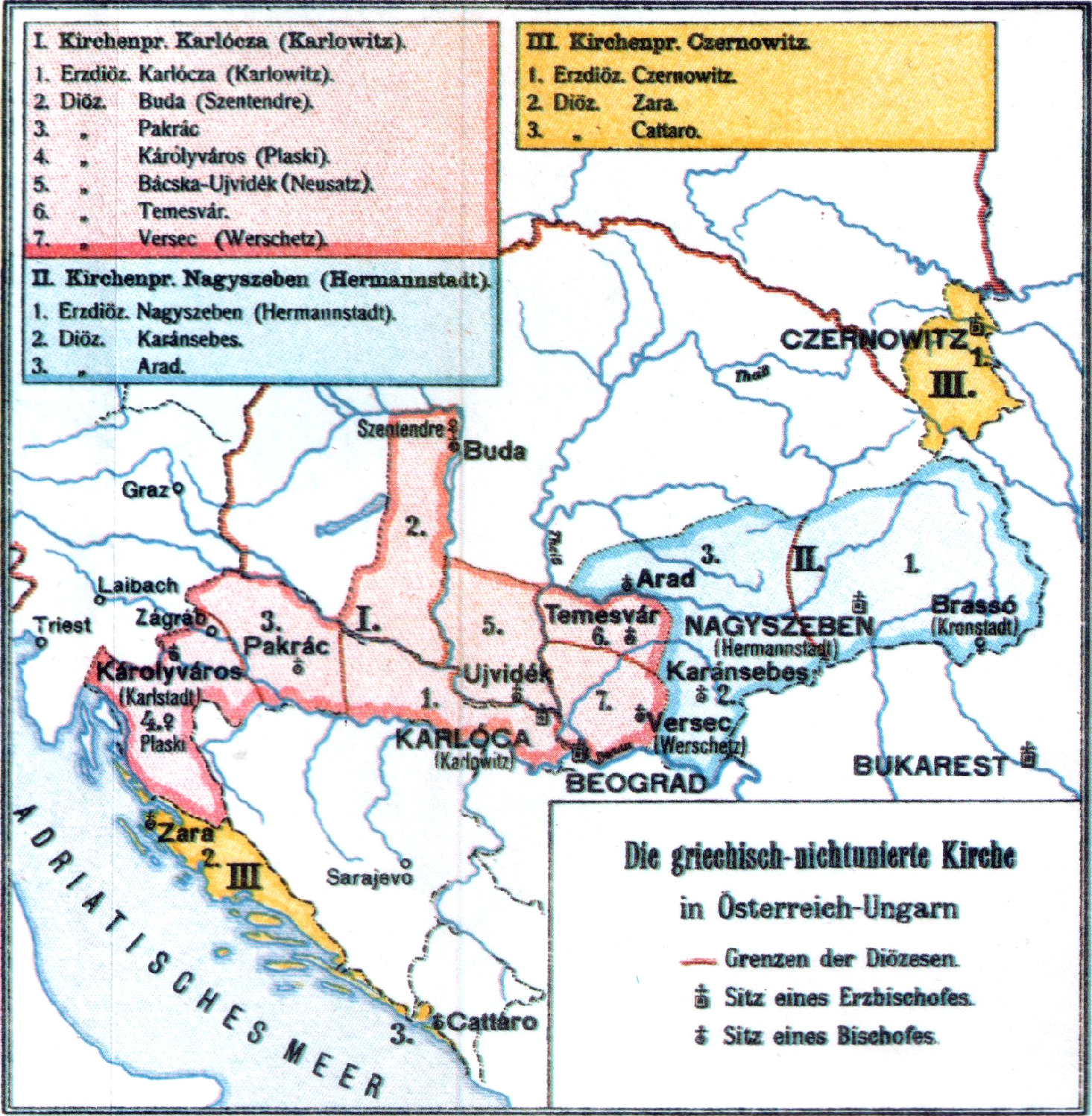
The jurisdiction of the Patriarchate of Karlovci in 1909

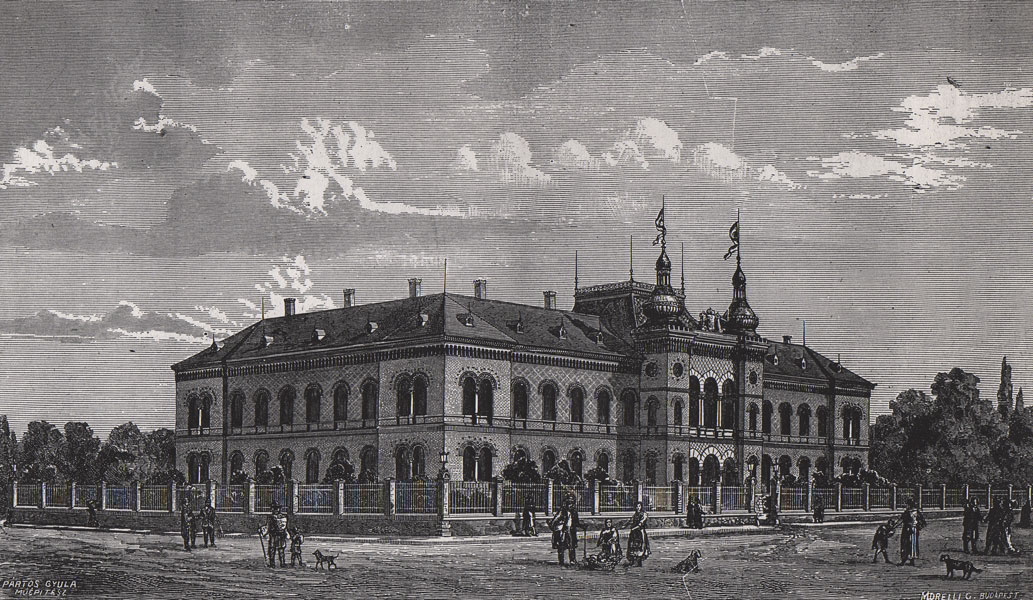
Palace of the Patriarchate, 1890

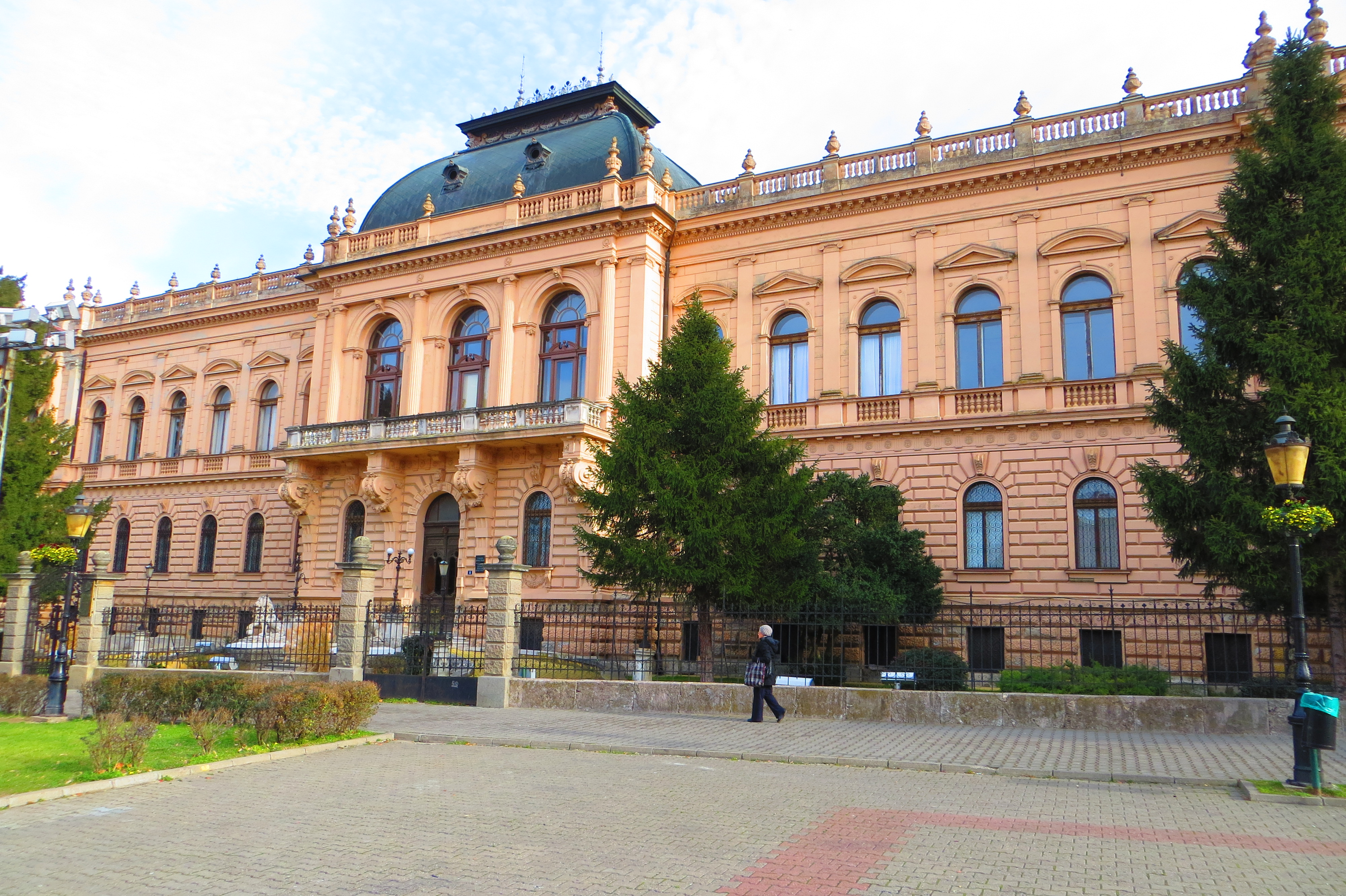
Palace of the Patriarchate, 2014

The establishment of the Patriarchate in Karlovci was seen as restoration of Serbian unity in Austria and Hungary and the patriarch was considered the ranking personage among the Serbs. Some authors claimed that actually the Habsburg dynasty in Austria founded the patriarchate of Karlovci because only a Sovereign could institute and recognize the rank of the Patriarch.

In 1865, the Eastern Orthodox Romanians that were under jurisdiction of the Patriarchate of Karlovci were separated and transferred to the jurisdiction of newly created Romanian Metropolitanate of Sibiu under Andrei Șaguna. Process was accomplished by mutual agreement that included the transfer of the Eparchy of Arad and eastern parts of Eparchy of Timișoara and Eparchy of Vršac.

In 1873, Bishopric of Chernivtsi in Bukovina, that was since 1783 under the spiritual jurisdiction of Karlovci, was elevated to the rank of Archbishopric when new Metropolitanate of Bukovina and Dalmatia was created for Cisleithanian eparchies. New Archbishop of Chernivtsi gained jurisdiction over Serbian eparchies of Dalmatia and Kotor, that also were (until then) under spiritual jurisdiction of Karlovci.

Emperor Franz Joseph I exercised full control over the Patriarchate. In 1890, contrary to the Serb Church Congress ruling but according to the Orthodox tradition of royal prerogatives, he promoted Georgije Branković to the patriarchal throne. That way the emperor discredited the Church hierarchy in the eyes of laity and encouraged rise of the anti-clerical Serb People's Radical Party in Austria-Hungary.

The last patriarch, Lukijan Bogdanović, was murdered in 1913. After his death, the patriarchal throne remained vacant for the last seven years of its existence, with following bishops serving as locum tenens: Miron Nikolić of Pakrac (1913 and 1914–1919), Mihailo Grujić of Gornji Karlovac (1913–1914) and Georgije Letić of Timișoara (1919–1920; coadjutor 1918–1919).

Following the dissolution of Austria-Hungary in the autumn of 1918, the Patriarchate of Karlovci was in 1920 merged into the unified Serbian Orthodox Church under one Serbian patriarch in Belgrade, with the title of Archbishop of Peć, Metropolitan of Belgrade and Karlovci and Serbian Patriarch.

During World War II, the Independent State of Croatia, a puppet state of Nazi Germany and Fascist Italy led by the Fascist Ustaše movement, was established in parts of occupied Yugoslavia. Due to the German pressure over growing anarchy in the country, caused by the Genocide of Serbs with the ultimate goal of creating an ethnically pure Greater Croatia, the Ustaše created a unrecognized sect named the Croatian Orthodox Church (1942–1945) in order to annihilate and Croatise the remaining Serb minority. It was meant to destroy religious, cultural and national ties between Serbs in Serbia and Serbs in the NDH, as the Ustaše at time could not achieve their goal of exterminating the whole Serb population of Croatia. After several robberies and bombings of Serbian Orthodox properties, and massacres and war crimes against Serbian Orthodox clergy, the Croatian Orthodox Church attempted to self-proclaim itself as the heir of the Patriarchate of Karlovci, but its Archbishop Germogen Maximov was enthroned in Zagreb.

== List of eparchies ==
Eparchy	Seat	Notes
Archdiocese of Karlovci	Sremski Karlovci	
Eparchy of Buda	Szentendre	
Eparchy of Pakrac	Pakrac	
Eparchy of Gornji Karlovac	Karlovac	
Eparchy of Bačka	Novi Sad	
Eparchy of Timișoara	Timișoara	
Eparchy of Vršac	Vršac	
Eparchy of Arad	Arad	until 1865
Eparchy of Bukovina	Chernivtsi	Spiritual jurisdiction only
Eparchy of Dalmatia	Šibenik	Spiritual jurisdiction only until 1873
Eparchy of Kotor	Kotor	Spiritual jurisdiction only until 1873

== List of patriarchs ==
No.	Primate	Portrait	Personal name	Reign	Title	Notes
1	Josif; Јосиф; Joseph		Ilija Rajačić; Илија Рајачић	1848–1861	Archbishop of Karlovci and Serbian Patriarch (1st Patriarch in Karlovci)	
2	Samuilo; Самуило; Samuel		Sava Maširević; Сава Маширевић	1864–1870	Archbishop of Karlovci and Serbian Patriarch (2nd Patriarch in Karlovci)	
3	Prokopije; Прокопије; Procopius		Petar Ivačković; Петар Ивачковић	1874–1879	Archbishop of Karlovci and Serbian Patriarch (3rd Patriarch in Karlovci)	
4	German; Герман; Herman		Grigorije Anđelić; Григорије Анђелић	1881–1888	Archbishop of Karlovci and Serbian Patriarch (4th Patriarch in Karlovci)	
5	Georgije; Георгије; George		Đorđe Branković; Ђорђе Бранковић	1890–1907	Archbishop of Karlovci and Serbian Patriarch (5th Patriarch in Karlovci)	
6	Lukijan; Лукијан; Lucian		Lazar Bogdanović; Лазар Богдановић	1908–1913	Archbishop of Karlovci and Serbian Patriarch (6th Patriarch in Karlovci)	Murdered in Bad Gastein under unclear circumstances

== See also ==
- Metropolitanate of Karlovci
- Serbian Patriarchate of Peć
- Serbian Orthodox Church

== Literature ==
- Bataković, Dušan T., ed. (2005). Histoire du peuple serbe [History of the Serbian People] (in French). Lausanne: L’Age d’Homme. ISBN 9782825119587.
- Ćirković, Sima (2004). The Serbs. Malden: Blackwell Publishing. ISBN 9781405142915.
- Ivić, Pavle, ed. (1995). The History of Serbian Culture. Edgware: Porthill Publishers. ISBN 9781870732314.
- Pavlovich, Paul (1989). The History of the Serbian Orthodox Church. Serbian Heritage Books. ISBN 9780969133124.
- Pavlowitch, Stevan K. (2002). Serbia: The History behind the Name. London: Hurst & Company. ISBN 9781850654773.
- Dušan Popov, Karlovačka mitropolija, Enciklopedija Novog Sada, sveska 10, Novi Sad, 1998.
- Radić, Radmila (2007). "Serbian Christianity". The Blackwell Companion to Eastern Christianity. Malden, MA: Blackwell Publishing. pp. 231–248. ISBN 9780470766392.
- Samardžić, Radovan; Duškov, Milan, eds. (1993). Serbs in European Civilization. Belgrade: Nova, Serbian Academy of Sciences and Arts, Institute for Balkan Studies. ISBN 9788675830153.
- Tomasevich, Jozo (2001). War and Revolution in Yugoslavia, 1941–1945: Occupation and Collaboration. Stanford: Stanford University Press. ISBN 9780804779241.
- Вуковић, Сава (1996). Српски јерарси од деветог до двадесетог века (Serbian Hierarchs from the 9th to the 20th Century). Евро, Унирекс, Каленић.
