= Saint Arsenije Serbian Orthodox Seminary =

Eastern Orthodox seminary in Sremski Karlovci, Serbia

Coordinates: 45°12′15″N 19°56′03″E

- Српска православна богословија Светог Арсенија
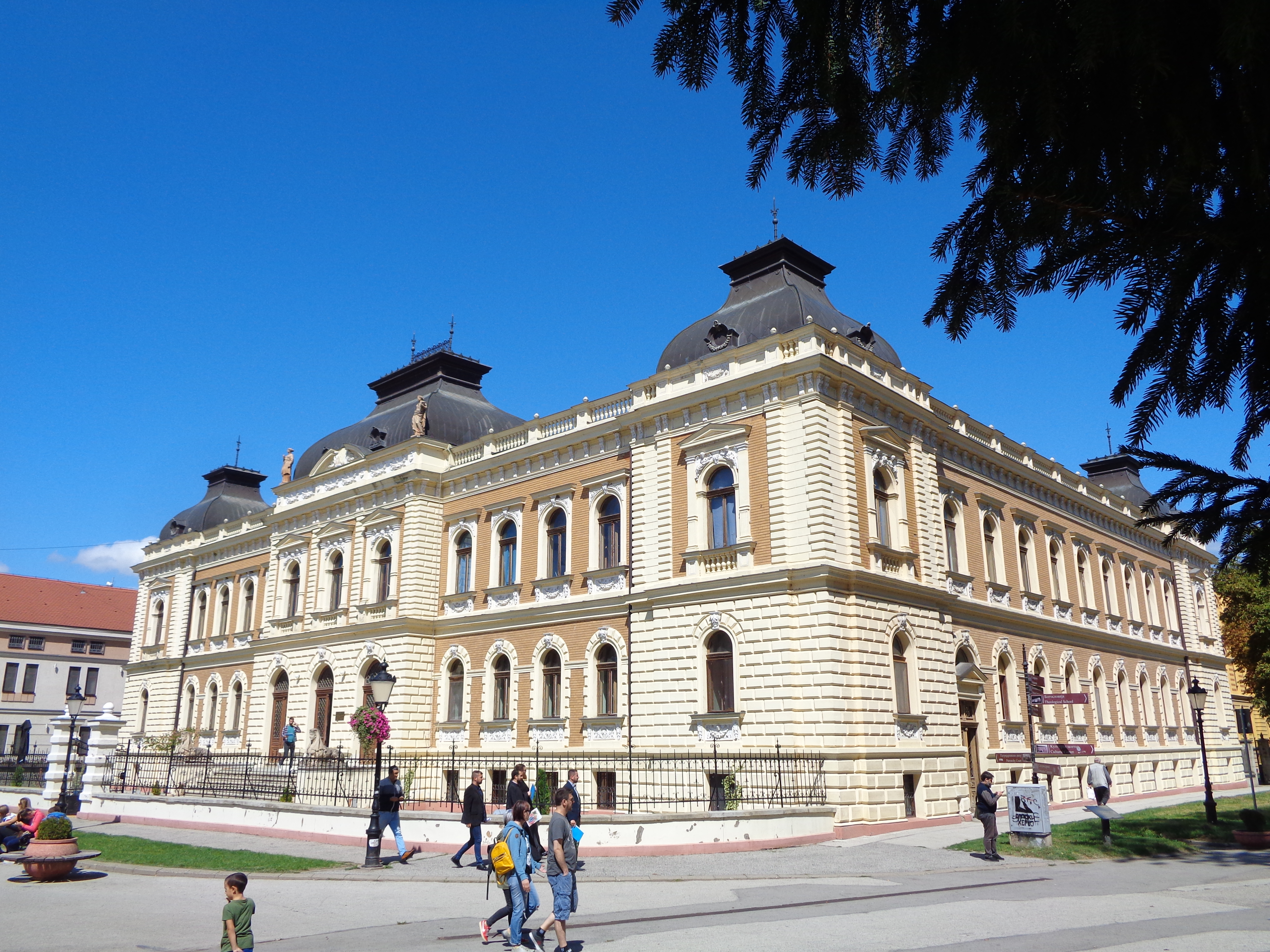
- Trg Patrijarha Brankovića 1 Sremski Karlovci; Serbia

Information
- Type: Seminary
- Religious affiliation: Eastern Orthodox
- Established: 1794
- Language: Serbian
- Campus: Urban
- Website: Official website

Saint Arsenije Serbian Orthodox Seminary (Serbian: Српска православна богословија Светог Арсенија, romanized: Srpska pravoslavna bogoslovija Svetog Arsenija) is a secondary education institution of the Serbian Orthodox Church located in Sremski Karlovci, Serbia. A boarding school, it prepares future clergymen for service in the Serbian Orthodox Church.

Founded in 1794, it is the second-oldest Orthodox seminary in the world, after the Kiev Theological Academy.

== History ==
The seminary was founded in 1794 by Metropolitan Stefan Stratimirović, at a time when the town served as the seat of the autocephalous Metropolitanate of Karlovci (later the Patriarchate of Karlovci).

During the 19th century, along with the Saint Sava Seminary in Belgrade, it formed the basis of Serbian theological education.

The seminary was closed in 1914, at the outbreak of the World War I and reestablished in Belgrade after the war. The modern seminary was established in 1964, in a building called zgrada Crkveno-narodnih fondova, built at the beginning of the 20th century by Patriarch Georgije Branković. The building of the school houses the Archives of Sremski Karlovci, the oldest archives in Serbia.

== Courses and curriculum ==
Seminary education lasts five years. Students study Bible (Old Testament, New Testament), Bible history, history of the Christianity, church singing, catechism, apology of faith, Liturgy, patrology, dogmatics, Canon law, pedagogy, homily, history of religion with Sects, History of the Serbian Orthodox Church, philosophy, ethics with Asceticism, and computer science. In addition to Serbian, students also study Russian, Greek, English, and Church Slavonic.

== See also ==
- Archives of Sremski Karlovci

== Literature ==
- Raković, Aleksandar (2013). "Karlovci Seminary: From one step to the level of the faculty (1914-1920) towards subsequent recognition of the faculty level (1925-1933)" (PDF). Теолошки погледи. 46 (2): 583–598.
