= Georgije Branković =

Serbian bishop

Георгије Бранковић
- Metropolitan of Karlovci
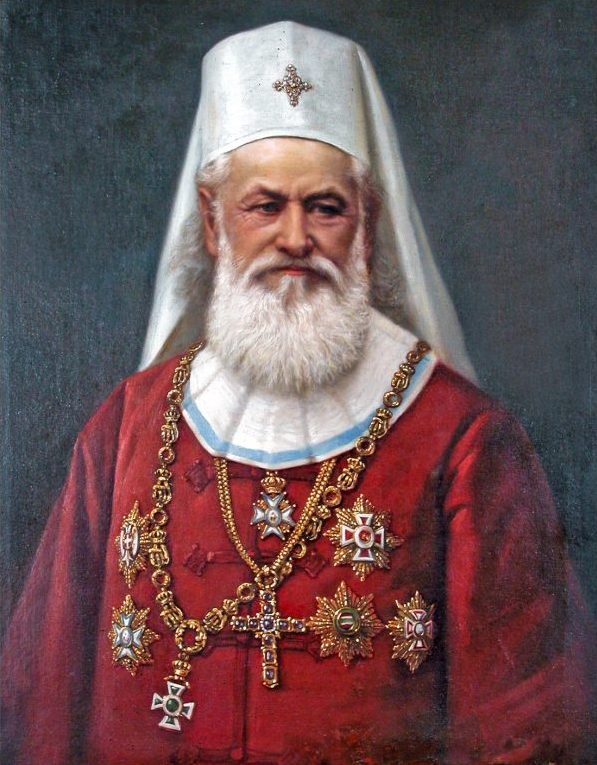
- Church: Serbian Orthodox Church
- Metropolis: Metropolitanate of Karlovci
- Installed: 1890
- Term ended: 1907
- Predecessor: German Anđelić
- Successor: Lukijan Bogdanović

Personal details
- Born: Ђорђе Бранковић; 13 March 1830 Kulpin, Austrian Empire (now Serbia)
- Died: 17 July 1907 (aged 77) Sremski Karlovci, Austria-Hungary (now Serbia)
- Denomination: Eastern Orthodox
- Residence: Sremski Karlovci

Georgije Branković (Serbian Cyrillic: Георгије Бранковић; 1830–1907) was the Patriarch of Karlovci, the spiritual leader of Habsburg Serbs, from 1890 until his death in 1907. He instigated a number of significant religious, educational, and economic reforms within territories covered by the Patriarchate, and was a renowned patron of the arts.

== Biography ==
A painting called Migration of the Serbs was commissioned by Patriarch Georgije for the 1896 Budapest Millennium Exhibition, marking a thousand years of the Hungarian Empire and reaffirming that country's territorial rights. Prompted by patriotism and contemporary politics, Patriarch Georgije convinced painter Paja Jovanović to present the case for the legitimacy of the Serbian historical presence and territorial claims and, as a consequence, contemporary acceptance of the "legal and privileged position of the Serbs in the Austrian monarchy". The Serbian understanding was that their migration was in response to Leopold I, Holy Roman Emperor's request for their assistance in protecting his borders against the Turks. The contemporary message was that this was the genesis of the Serbian presence in the border areas now under Austria-Hungary.

Eastern Orthodox Church titles
Preceded by German Anđelić	Serbian Patriarch of Karlovci; 1890–1907	Succeeded by Lukijan Bogdanović
Preceded by Georgije Vojnović	Bishop of Temišvar; 1882–1890	Succeeded by Nikanor Popović
