= Moračnik (island) =

Coordinates: 42°8′24″N 19°15′25″E

Moračnik (Serbian Cyrillic: Морачник) is an island in Lake Skadar in the Montenegrin municipality of Bar.

== Monastery ==
The Moračnik Monastery (Serbian Cyrillic: Манастир Морачник) is a Serbian Orthodox monastery built on the Moračnik island on the Skadar Lake, modern-day Montenegro. The monastery was first mentioned in 1417 in the chapter issued by Balša III.
