= Moračnik Monastery =

Serbian Orthodox monastery on Skadar Lake, Montenegro

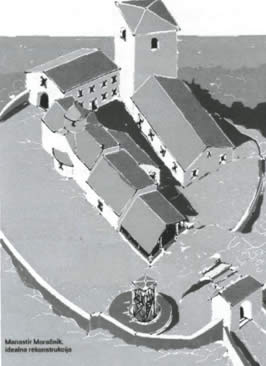
- Ideal reconstruction of the monastery

- Location within Montenegro

Religion
- Affiliation: Serbian Orthodox Church
- Ecclesiastical or organizational status: Metropolitanate of Montenegro and the Littoral

Location
- Location: Moračnik island on Skadar Lake
- State: Montenegro
- Interactive map of Moračnik Monastery
- Coordinates: 42.1400°N 19.2572°E

Architecture
- Funded by: Balša III
- Completed: between 1400 and 1417

The Moračnik Monastery (Serbian: Манастир Морачник, romanized: Manastir Moračnik) is a Serbian Orthodox monastery on Moračnik island on Skadar Lake, Montenegro. It is positioned across from the village of Bobovište, whose residents used it as their church before they converted to Islam.

== History ==
The name of the monastery is derived from the name of the island. The monastery was mentioned in the chapter issued by Balša III in 1417 by which he granted a salt evaporation pond to the monastery. It was built after 1400, probably between 1403 and 1417. The monastery was so poor in the 17th century that in 1665 its hegumen, together with hegumen and monks from Vranjina Monastery, requested help from Catholic bishop of Scutari Pjetër Bogdani. During Montenegrin-Ottoman war in 1853 monastery was attacked by Ottoman forces. Defended by three Leković brothers: Mališa, Savo and Andrija from the nearby Godinje village who were badly outnumbered, it was eventually captured while his defenders according to a local folklore died a heroic death. Until 1997, when the first liturgy was done, the monastery was defunct. Pavel Rovinsky thought that this monastery was part of nearby Prečista Krajinska Monastery.

== See also ==
- List of Serb Orthodox monasteries
