= Sava Petrović =

Sava Petrović may refer to:

- Sava Petrović (prince-bishop) (1702–1782), Metropolitan of Montenegro
- Sava Petrović (botanist) (1839–1889), Serbian botanist and doctor of medicine
- Sava Petrović (painter) (1788–1857), Serbian icon painter and portraitist
