= Platon Atanacković =

Serbian bishop, writer, linguist and patron

His Eminence Platon Atanacković
- Bishop of Bačka
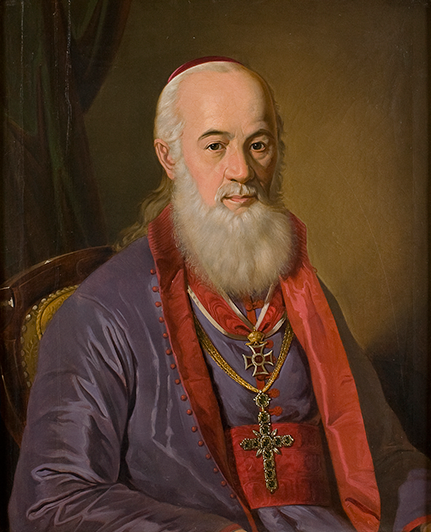
- Aksentije Marodić - Bishop Platon Atanacković, Gallery of Matica Srpska
- Church: Serbian Orthodox Church
- Diocese: Eparchy of Bačka
- Installed: 1851
- Term ended: 1867
- Predecessor: Georgije Hranislav
- Successor: German Anđelić

Personal details
- Born: 10 July 1788 Sombor, Vojvodina, Habsburg monarchy
- Died: 21 April 1867 (aged 78) Novi Sad, Habsburg monarchy

Platon Atanacković (Sombor, Vojvodina, Habsburg monarchy, 10 July 1788 – Novi Sad, Habsburg Monarchy, 21 April 1867) was a writer, linguist, patron of Serb culture, bishop of the Eparchy of Bačka and president of Matica srpska.

Born in the then Austro-Hungarian-occupied Vojvodina, he became the bishop of Bačka and promoted education among his people in the diaspora and the home country. With help of the German translation of Frédéric Eichhoff's works, he demonstrated the cognition of Sanskrit and Serbian (Srodstvo slavenoserbskog jezika sa sanskritam or Affinity of Slavo-Serbian languages and Sanskrit, Letopis Matice srpske, 1843).

Platon's secular name was Pavle. He was involved in literature, politics and humanitarian work. He taught for 70 years as a professor in Szentendre, Hungary. In 1829, he became a monk in Krušedol Monastery, after his wife died. Soon, he was elevated to the ecclesiastical rank of abbot, and then Archimandrite. He became in 1839 bishop of the Eparchy of Buda. Back then, he got transferred to the state government in the Eparchy of Bačka.

He did much for education and the promotion of culture in the nation. He helped financially to establish the Serbian Law Academy in Novi Sad, and he established a foundation in Sombor for the education of poor students, and assisted the Serbian National Theatre.

== Works ==
During his lifetime he wrote more than 40 literary and scholastic works, including a few translations from German:

- Bukvar (Serbian Primer)
- Prinos rodoljubivih mislej na žertvenik narodnoga napretka,
- Dijetalne besede,
- Povjest rezidencije episkopa budimskago,
- Apostoli i Evanđelje u prazničani i nedjeljni dana preko cijele godine,
- Pedagogika,
- Metodika,
- Srodstvo slavenoserbskog jezika sa sanskritam
- Starozavetni Proroci svi sedamnajst, translated from German by Platon Atanackovic, Bishop of Backa, Novi Sad, 1861
- Radost' u isceleiu negovoga kralevskoga erchercoga Iosifa, ungarie palatine, 1864
- Tobias, Judith, Esther, Job, translated from German by Platon Atanackovic, Bishop of Buda, Novi Sad, 1858
- Socinenija Solomonova i Sirachova, translated from German Die Werke Solomons und Sirachs by Platon Atanackovic, Bishop of Backa, Vienna, 1857
- Slovce Presvjascennejseg Gospodina Platona Atanackovica, Episkop Budimskog, Novi Sad, 1839

Eastern Orthodox Church titles
Preceded by Pantelejmon Živković	Bishop of Buda; 1839–1851	Succeeded by Arsenije Stojković
Vacant Title last held by Georgije Hranislav	Bishop of Bačka; 1851–1867	Succeeded by German Anđelić
