= Arsenije Stojković =

Serbian Orthodox Bishop of Buda (1804–1892)

His Eminence Arsenije Stojković
- Bishop of Buda
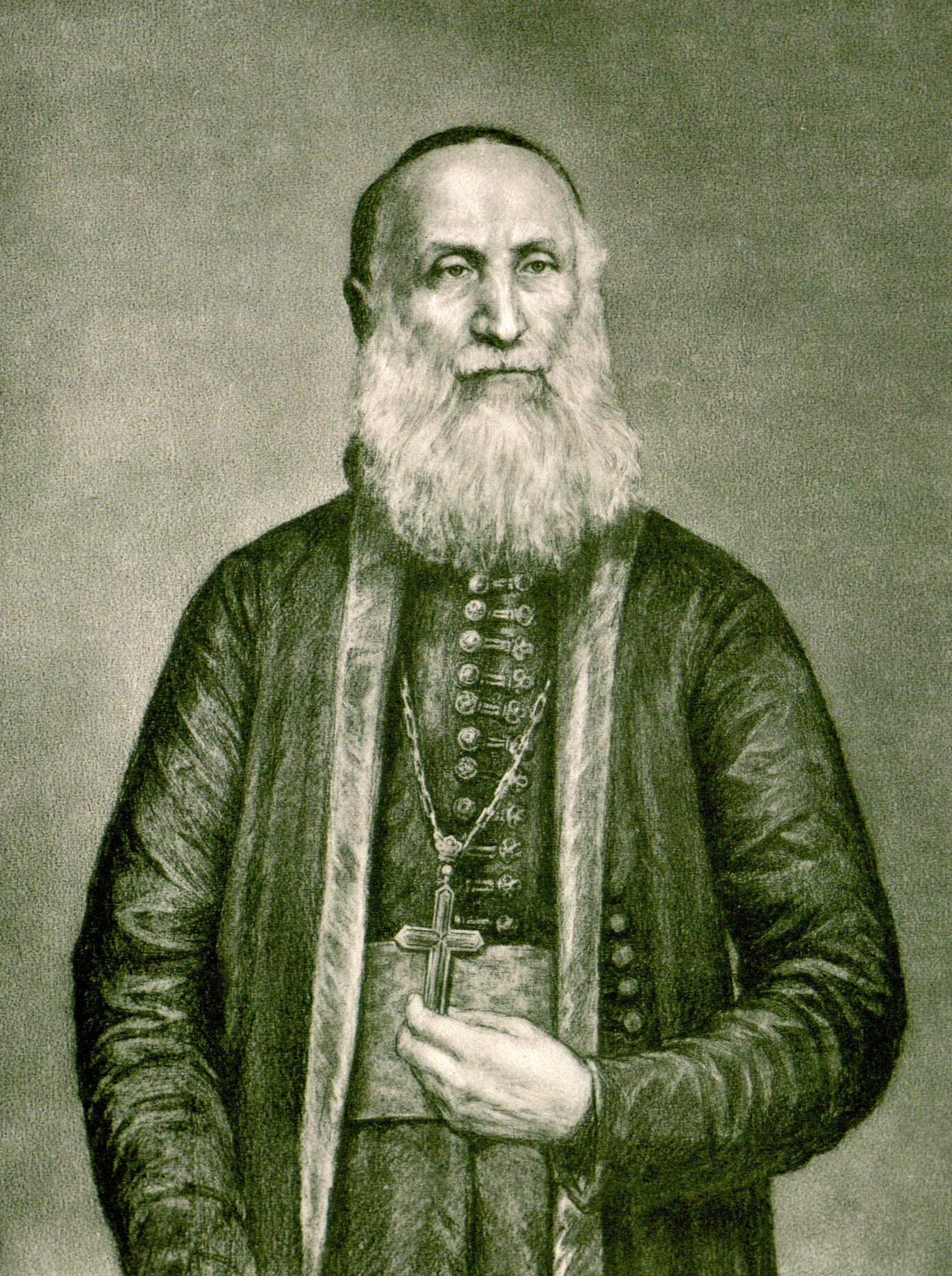
- Church: Serbian Orthodox Church
- Diocese: Eparchy of Buda
- Installed: 1852
- Term ended: 1892
- Predecessor: Platon Atanacković
- Successor: Jeremija Mađarević

Personal details
- Born: 28 October 1804 Mokrin, Habsburg monarchy
- Died: 29 March 1892 (aged 87) Szentendre, Austria-Hungary

Arsenije Stojković (28 October 1804 - 29 March 1892) was bishop of the Serbian Orthodox Church, though elected Serbian patriarch he was never confirmed as such by the Hungarian government. He held the office of Bishop of the Eparchy of Buda from 1853 to 1892.

== Biography ==
Stojković was born on 28 October 1804 in Mokrin, where his father Trifun was a deacon and teacher. After graduating from the gymnasium, he taught at elementary school in Mokrin and Sentivan. He started teaching in high school in Szeged, and ended up in Timișoara. After completing his teacher training in Sombor, he completed the Theological Seminary in Vršac. After graduating from the Theological College he studied philosophy in Szeged and law in Pest.

== Monastic life ==
He was tonsured at the Rakovac monastery by the hieromonk Panteleimon Živković, the deputy archimandrite of Rakovac Antonije Nako, the latter bishop of Timișoara. Upon his ordination to the rank of deacon, he was the associate deacon of Metropolitan Stefan Stratimirović and professor of Theology at the Clerical High School of Saint Arsenije in Sremski Karlovci. He was elevated to the rank of Protodeacon in 1831, and in the rank of archdeacon in 1833. For several years he was also a notary of the Archdiocese of Sremski Karlovci. As a professor of theology, he was nominated in 1839 for the post of archimandrite of Rakovac monastery, and in 1845 he was transferred as archimandrite to the Grgeteg Monastery. After the death of Bishop Georgije Hranislav, he administered the Diocese of Bačka for eight years.

He was elected bishop of Buda on November 10, 1852, and was consecrated by the patriarch Josif Rajačić on 28 April 1853 in the church of Karlovac. He remained in this diocese until 1892. After the death of Patriarch Samuilo Maširević, he was appointed Administrator of the Patriarchate of Sremski Karlovci in 1870, and in 1872 was removed from that position. When he was elected patriarch in 1874, he was unanimously elected Serbian patriarch, but the Viennese government refused to confirm him. The same thing happened again in 1881 when he was elected patriarch by a majority. Both times, the emperor distinguished him but did not want to confirm him as patriarch.

He died on March 29, 1892, in Szentendre and was buried there in the Cathedral of the Serbian Orthodox Church.

Eastern Orthodox Church titles
Preceded by Platon Atanacković	Bishop of Buda; 1852–1892	Succeeded by Jeremija Mađarević
