= Pavel Petrović =

Serbian painter

Pavle Petrović also variously spelled Pavel Petrovits, Paul Petrovits, Paulus Petrovitz, Paulus Petrovits and Pablo Petrovits (Serbian Cyrillic: Павел Петровић: Temesvár, Kingdom of Hungary (now Timișoara, Romania), 1818 - Rome, Kingdom of Italy, 14 June 1887) was a Serbian painter. He can be considered among the first 19th-century European-trained painters who decided to make a living by traveling for forty-year across all continents, leaving portraits behind him that capture the best of European Romanticism of the time. His works can be found in museums and private collections in Serbia, Romania, England, India, China, the United States of America, Hawaii, Chile, Peru, Canada, Australia, Egypt, and Italy.

While travelling to Australia in April 1881, Petrović’s second wife, Elizabeth, suddenly died. Police chief Frederick Standish investigated suicide and found no foul play, though the press still spread rumours overseas that would haunt Petrović's reputation for years to come, eventually contributing to his marginalization altogether.

In the beginning, Petrović was not well-known in his country of origin until Serbian art historian Miodrag Marković began in 2015 researching his life and work.

== Early life and education ==
He was born Pavle Petrović in 1818 in Timișoara (Temesvár), the capital city of today's Romanian Banat, which was at that time a part of the Kingdom of Hungary, in the Austrian Empire (hence he was also mentioned as a Hungarian, Austrian, Romanian and even Russian and Polish national in some obscure sources). His father Sava Petrović (1788-1861), an accomplished painter, seeing in his son a predilection in painting, made sure that he got the best academic training in art. Sava and his wife Maria Sibeslov came originally from a nearby village of Izvin and settled in 1814 in Timișoara's suburb Fabrika, where the majority of the population was Serbian at the time. They had three sons, Nikola, Vladimir, and Pavle, the youngest and the only one who took up his father's profession.

When he was quite young, he served as his father's apprentice. There, he learned drawing, painting, shading, color theory, and the art of mixing paints from various natural pigments and minerals.

After graduating from a gymnasium in Timișoara, Sava sent Pavel to Vienna, where he enrolled at the Academy of Fine Arts. His professor was Leopold Kupelwieser, a follower of the Romantic Nazarene movement. He attended the academy at about the same time as his compatriot artists Dimitrije Avramović and Anastas Jovanović. Upon returning to his hometown, Petrović received numerous painting commissions, primarily for portraits, icons, and iconostases. Later, he decided to make a living as a continent-hopping traveling painter.

Petrović also travelled throughout the United States, living and working in New York, Cleveland, San francisco, Los Angeles, Cincinnati, Chicago, and later, resumed his travels over several years to Honolulu, Calcutta, the Malaysian state of Johor, Bangkok, Cairo, and Rome where he died in 1887.

== International Commissions (partial list) ==
In his travels, Pavel Petrović painted a gallery of portraits that included: Benigna Cornelia Palacios y Bolivar, niece of Simon Bolivar; Carolina Gutierrez de la Fuente, daughter of General Antonio Gutierrez de la Fuente; Lydia Jones, the wife of William Jefferson Jones, and her mother, writer Sarah Rogers Haight, the wife of Richard K. Haight; Edmond Goold, Rabbi Dr. Elkan Cohn; Romualdo Pacheco; General Andres Pico, singer Marie Aimée Trochon (1852-1887); Morris Wukheim; Prudent Beaudry; William Workman and William Workman-Temple I; Maharaja Duleep Singh; Roger Vaughan (bishop); John Williams, Grand Master of Masonic Lodge of New South Wales; Frederick Standish; Dr. Isaac Mayer Wise; William Wiswell; Railroad magnate E. P. Welty and his wife; Walter M. Gibson; Alexander Cartwright; King Kalakaua and his wife Queen Kapiolani; Princess Poomaikelani; Frederick Hamilton-Temple-Blackwood, 1st Marquess of Dufferin and Ava, the 8th Viceroy of India, and and his wife; Sultan Abu Bakar of Johor; Chulalongkorn, King Rama V of Siam; Tewfik Pasha, the Khediva of Egypt; King Umberto I of Italy and Queen Margherita of Savoy.

== See also ==
- List of Serbian painters
