= Saint George Cathedral, Novi Sad =

Cathedral in Novi Sad, Serbia

Saint George the Great Martyr Cathedral
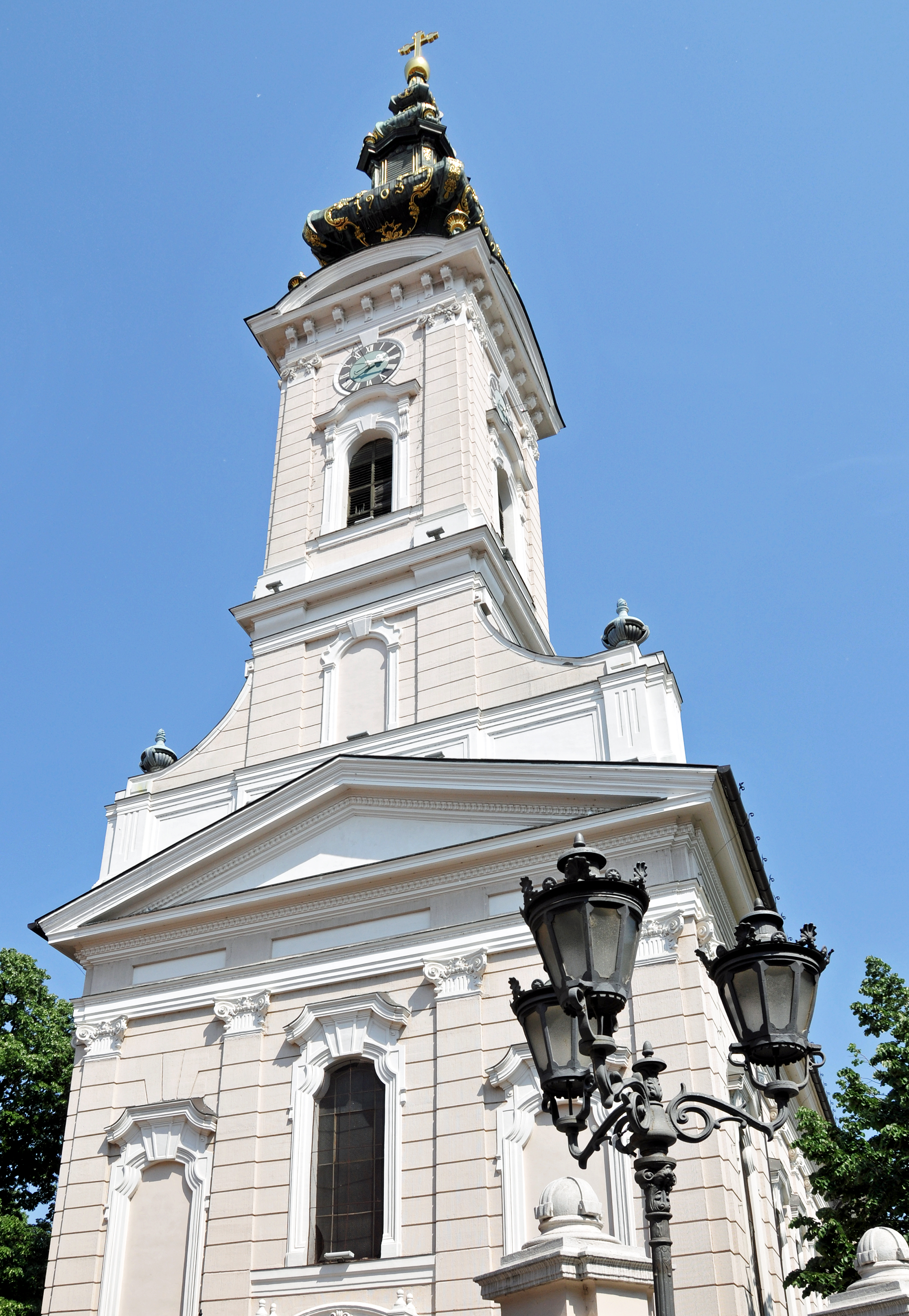
- Saint George Cathedral the Great Martyr, pictured in 2012
- Saint George the Great Martyr Cathedral
- 45°15′26″N 19°50′53″E
- Location: Novi Sad
- Country: Serbia
- Denomination: Serbian Orthodox Church

History
- Status: Church
- Dedication: Saint George

Architecture
- Functional status: Active
- Style: Neo-classicism
- Years built: 1860-1905

Administration
- Archdiocese: Eparchy of Bačka

The Saint George the Great Martyr Cathedral (Serbian: Саборна црква Светог великомученика Георгија, romanized: Saborna crkva Svetog velikomučenika Georgija), is an Eastern Orthodox church located in Novi Sad, Serbia. It is under jurisdiction of the Eparchy of Bačka of the Serbian Orthodox Church and serves as its cathedral church. It is located next to Bishop's Palace, Serbian Orthodox Church parish house and Jovan Jovanović Zmaj Gymnasium.

== History ==
An older church in the baroque style began building in 1720, and extended in 1734, during the time of Empress Maria Theresia, Patriarch Arsenije IV Jovanović and Archpriest Visarion Pavlović. It was burnt down in a bombing in 1849, during the Revolutions in the Habsburg areas. The planning of the present-day church began in 1851, and it was built between 1860 and 1880 on the ruins of the old one, with further renovations and completion by 1905 under design by architect Milan Michal Harminc, during the office of Mitrofan Šević. A new tower with new bells from Budapest was added during the rebuilding.

== Architecture ==
The cathedral is dedicated to Saint George. The church interior includes an iconostasis with 33 icons, historical pictures above both choirs (coronation of Stefan the First-Crowned and Saint Sava pacifying his brothers Stefan and Vukan), as well as two large throne icons of Saint Sava and Virgin Mary, painted by renowned academic Paja Jovanović, which are considered to be his best ecclesiastical works. The wall paintings were made by Stevan Aleksić. The stained-glass windows were installed in 1905. They were created by the Budapest artist Imre Zseller. The windows depict saints and historical figures as standing figures with traditional attributes; a significant part of the composition is occupied by ornamental decor in the Baroque style. The carved structure of the iconostasis was produced by the 'Retej and Benedek' workshop from Budapest. It is one of the foremost monuments of the religious architecture in Novi Sad.

The Theophany Cross (Serbian: Богојављенски крст, Bogojavljenski krst), also known as the Cross of the Holy vow (Serbian: Заветни крст, Zavetni krst), located in the church's courtyard is the oldest surviving monuments in Novi Sad, dating back to the 18th century. The monument was damaged during the Hungarian revolution of 1848 and was repaired with the financial aid of Marija Trandafil in 1867. The monument was originally located at the corner of modern day Zmaj Jovina and Miletićeve streets, before it was moved to its current location in 1956. It is made of rose colored marble, with a half a meter tall cross.

== Gallery ==
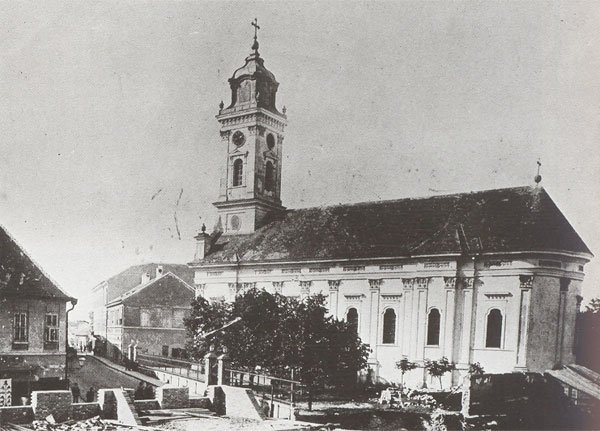
Saint George Cathedral, 1902

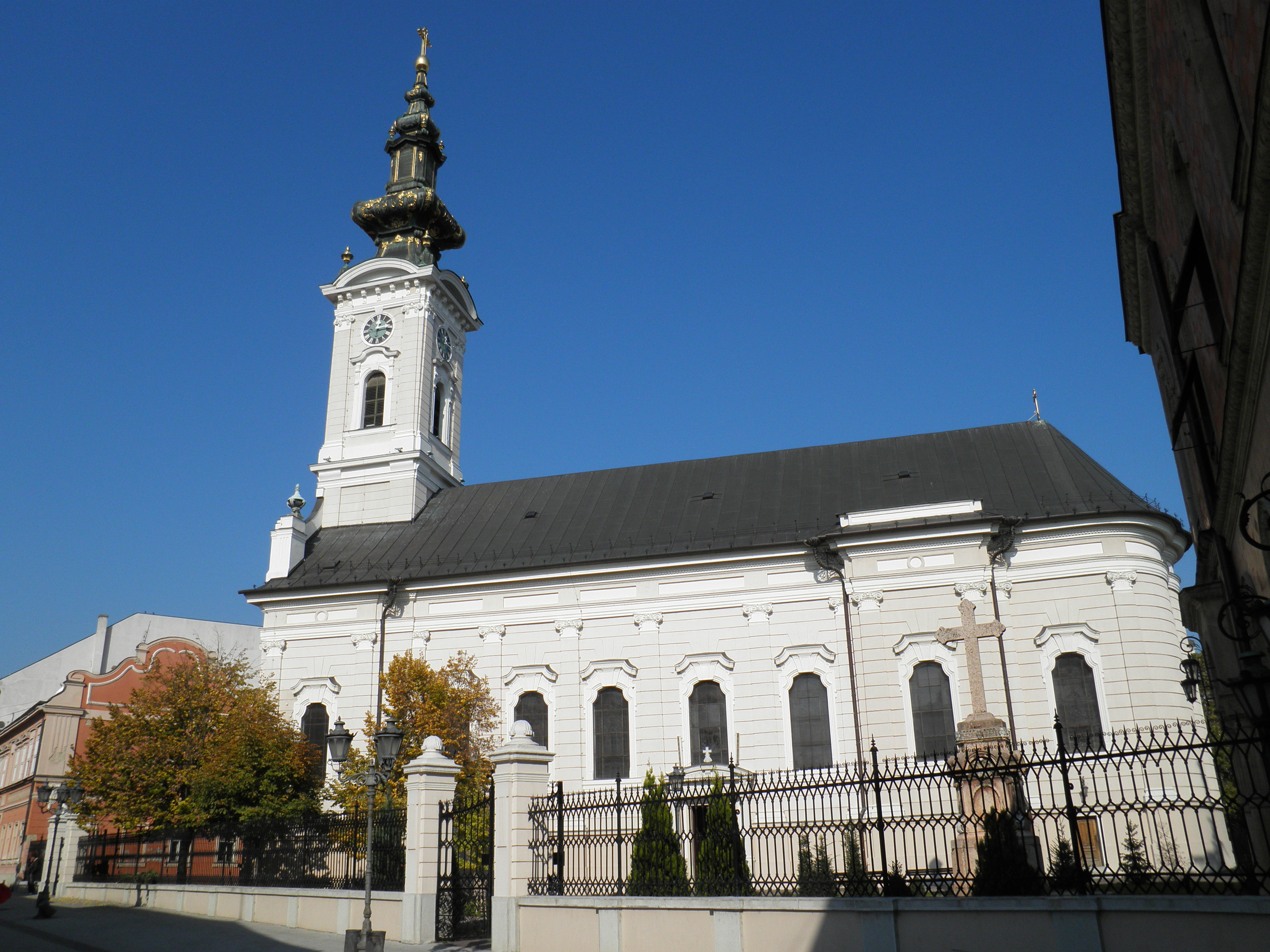
Saint George Cathedral side profile

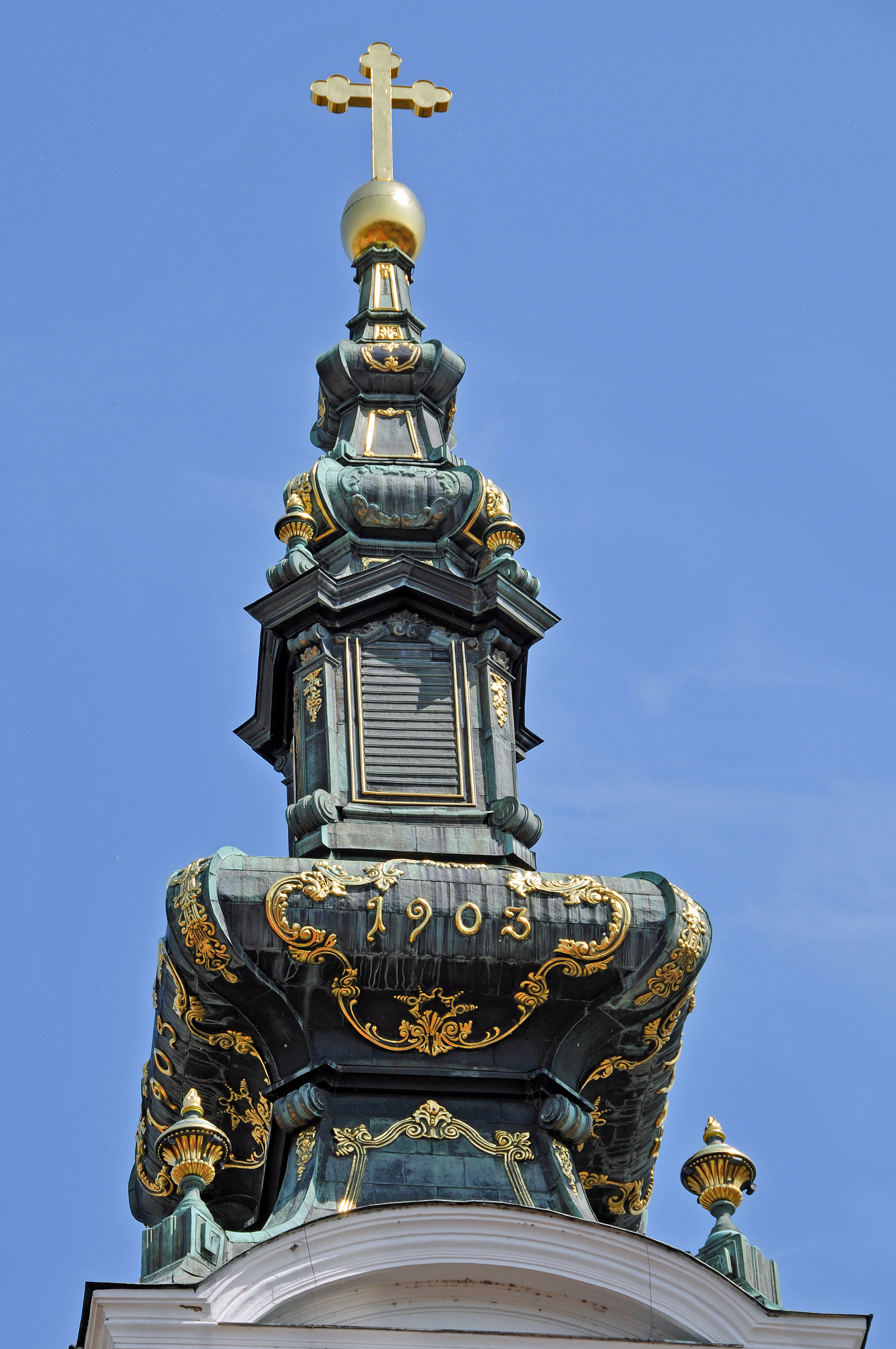
Church bell tower

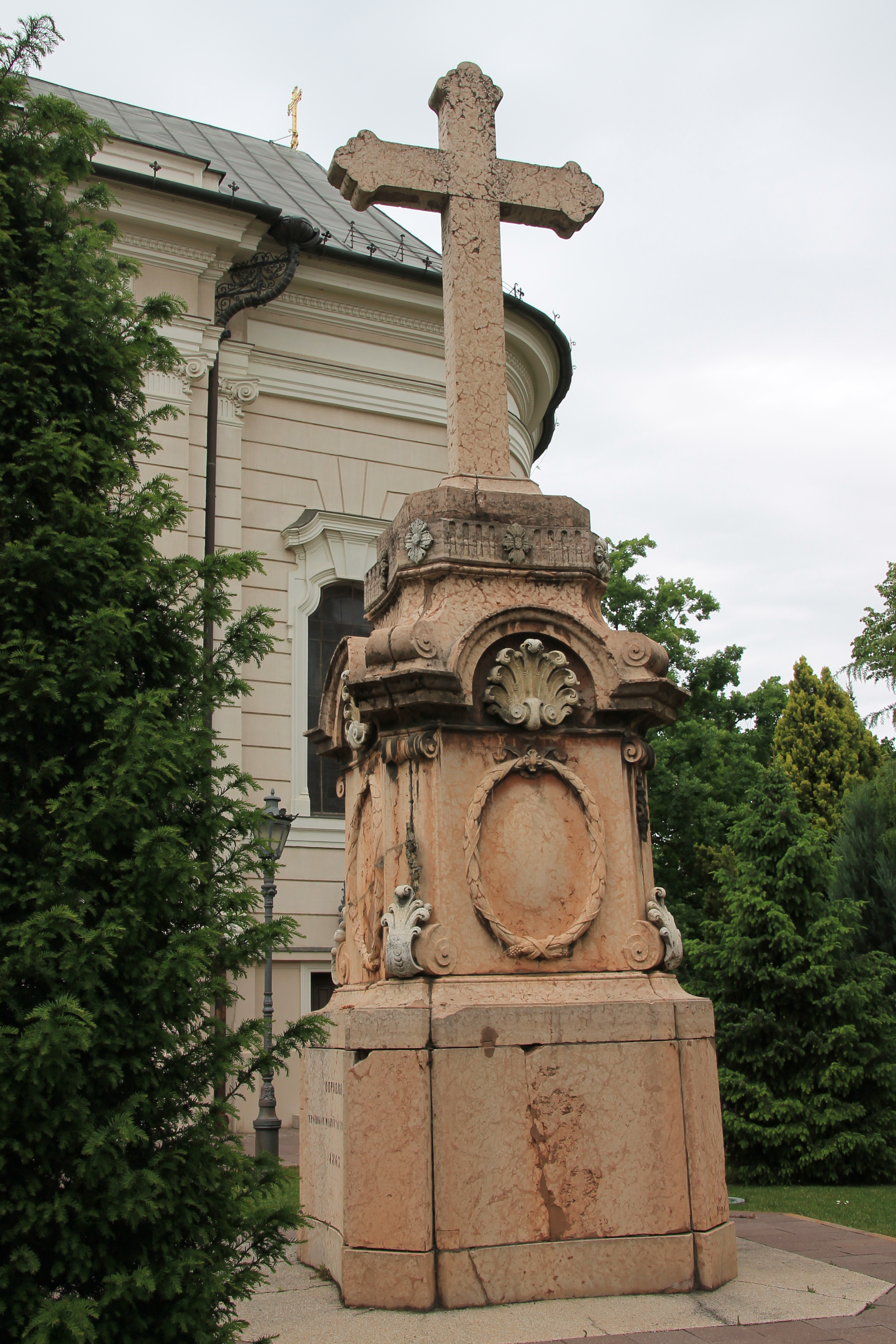
The Theophany Cross monument in the church's courtyard

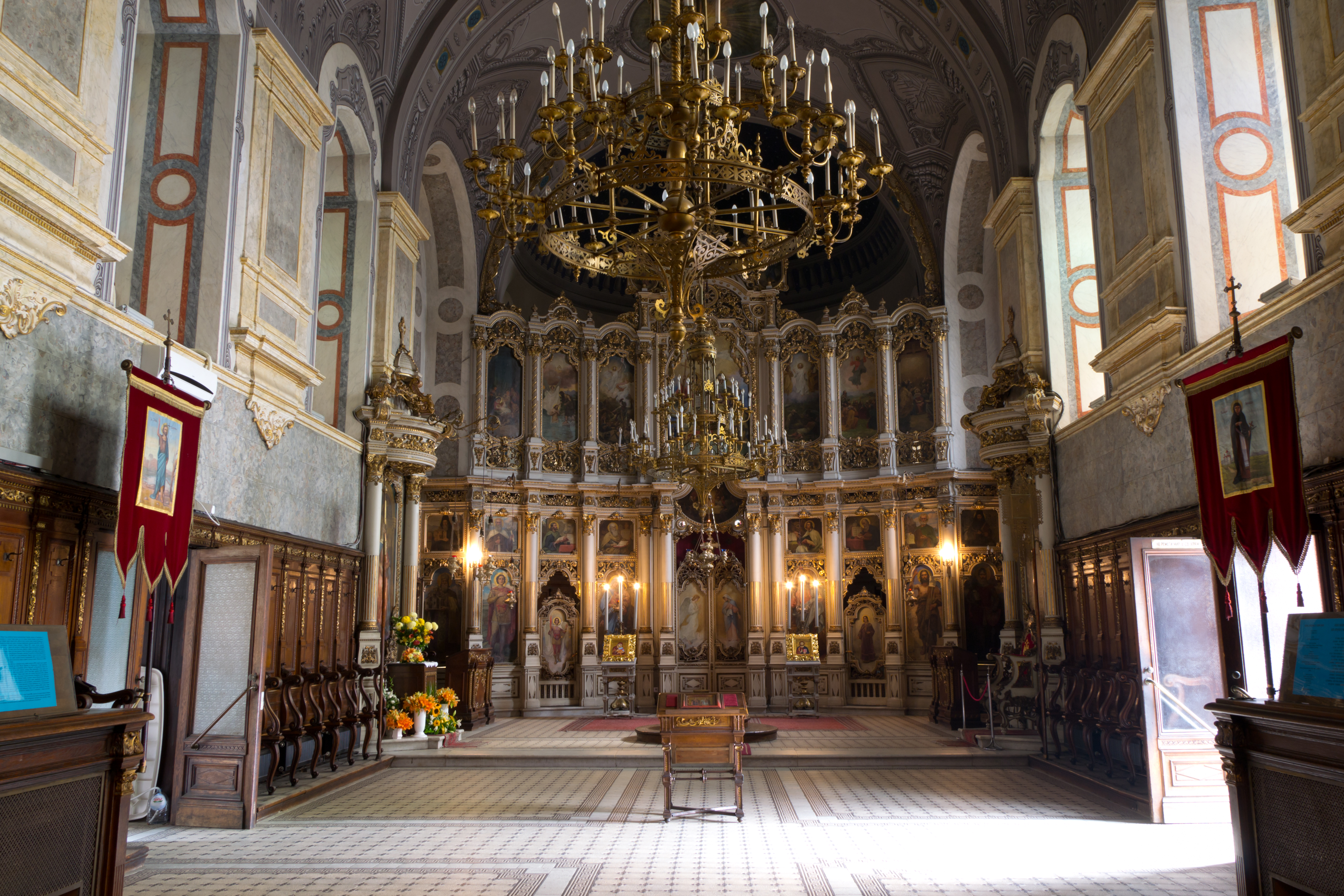
Interior

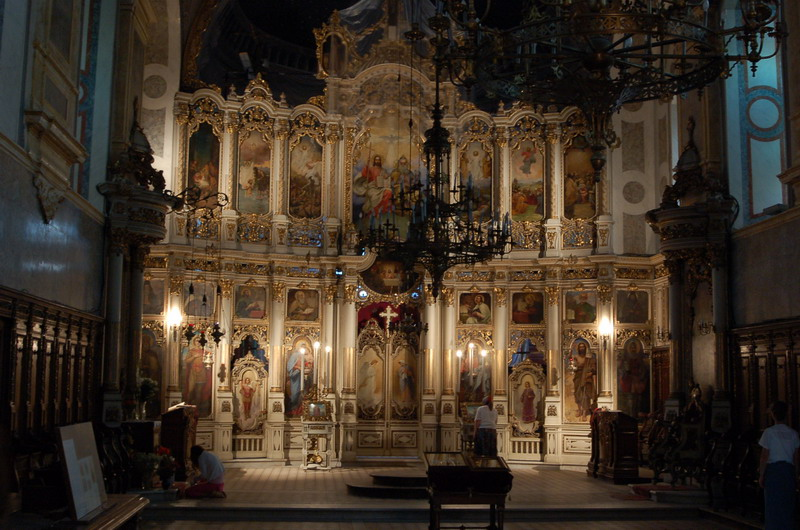
Iconostasis, painted by Paja Jovanović

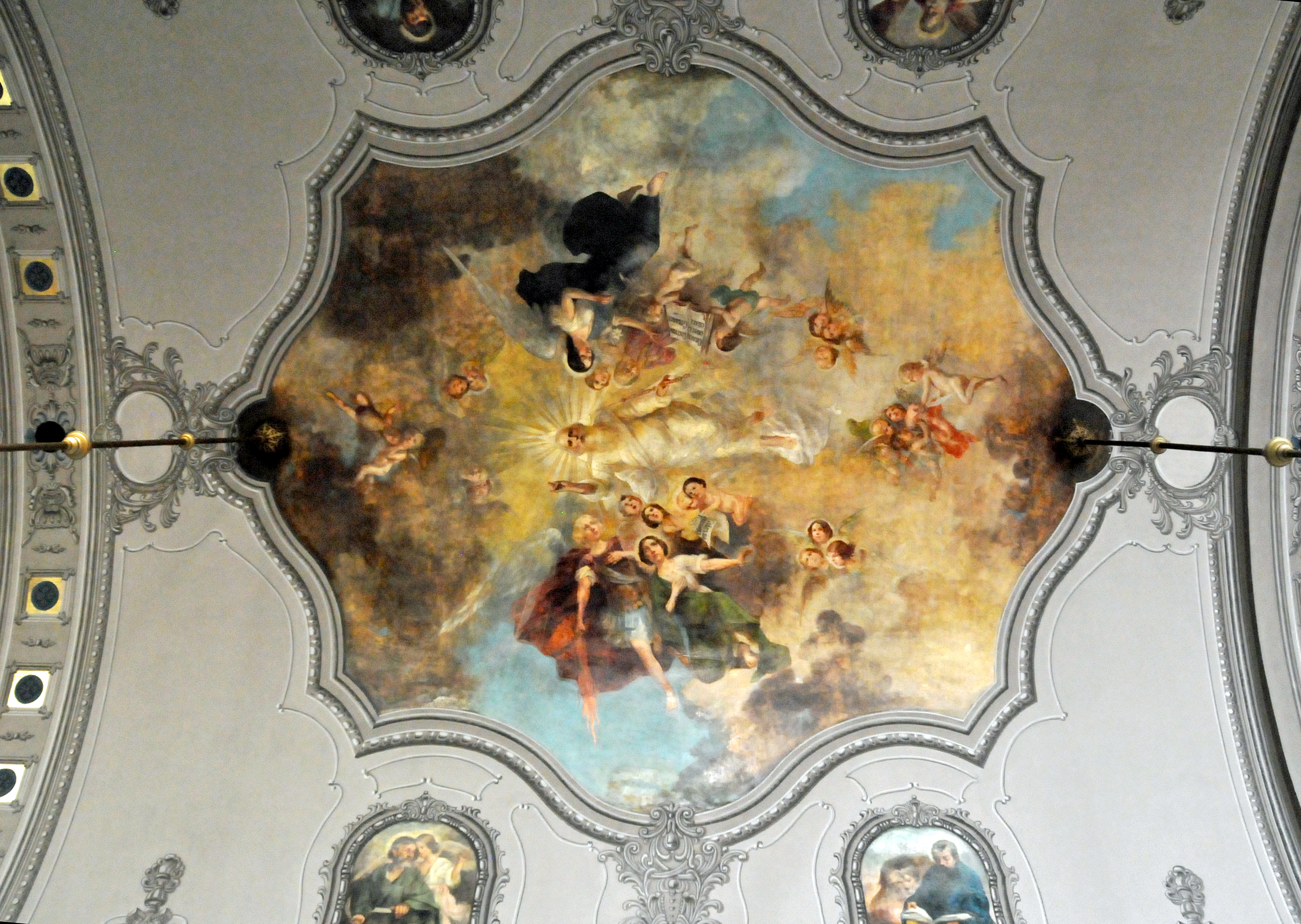
Ceiling fresco, painted by Stevan Aleksić

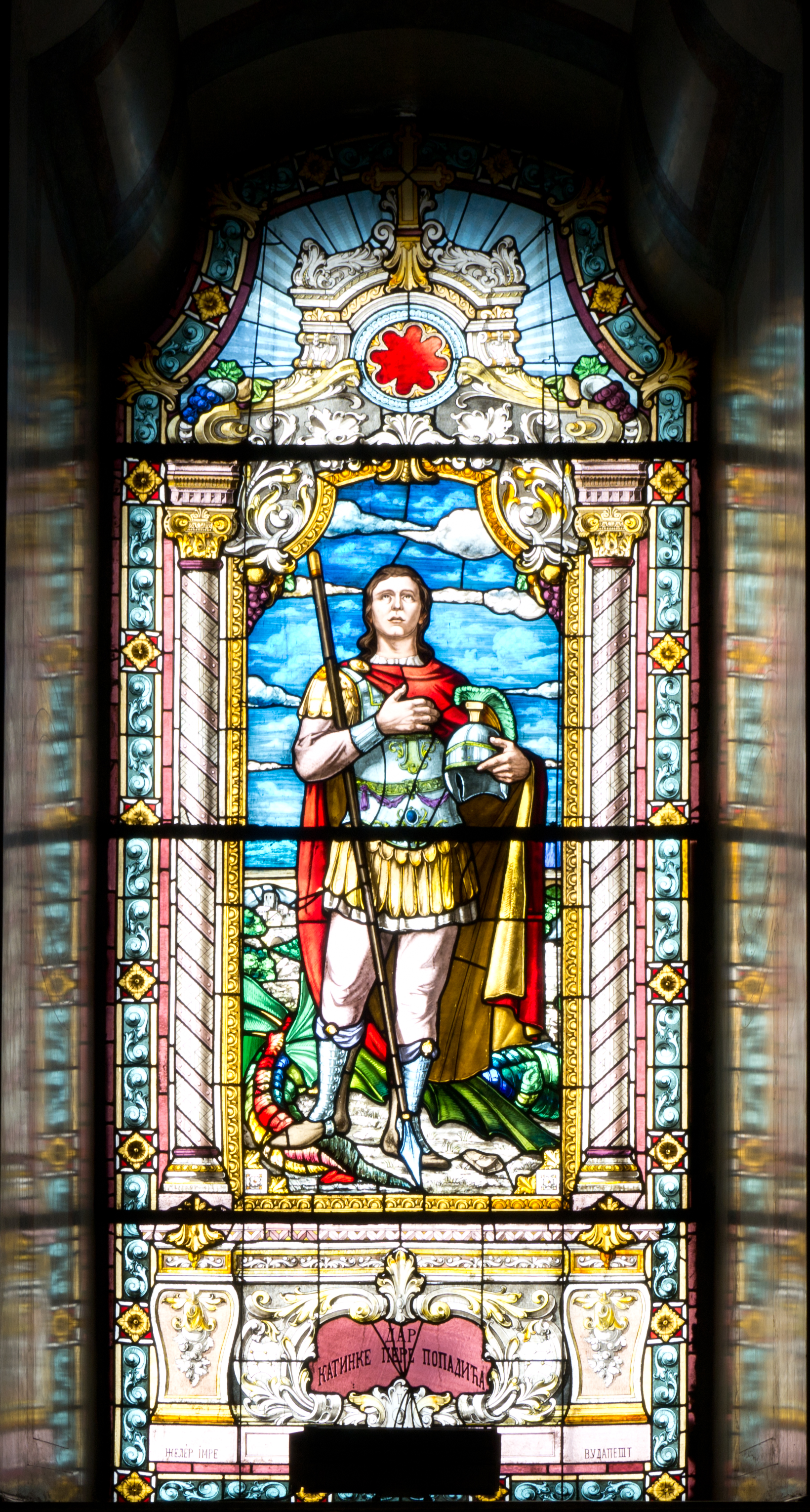
Stained glass of Saint George, done by Kantinka Pera Popadić

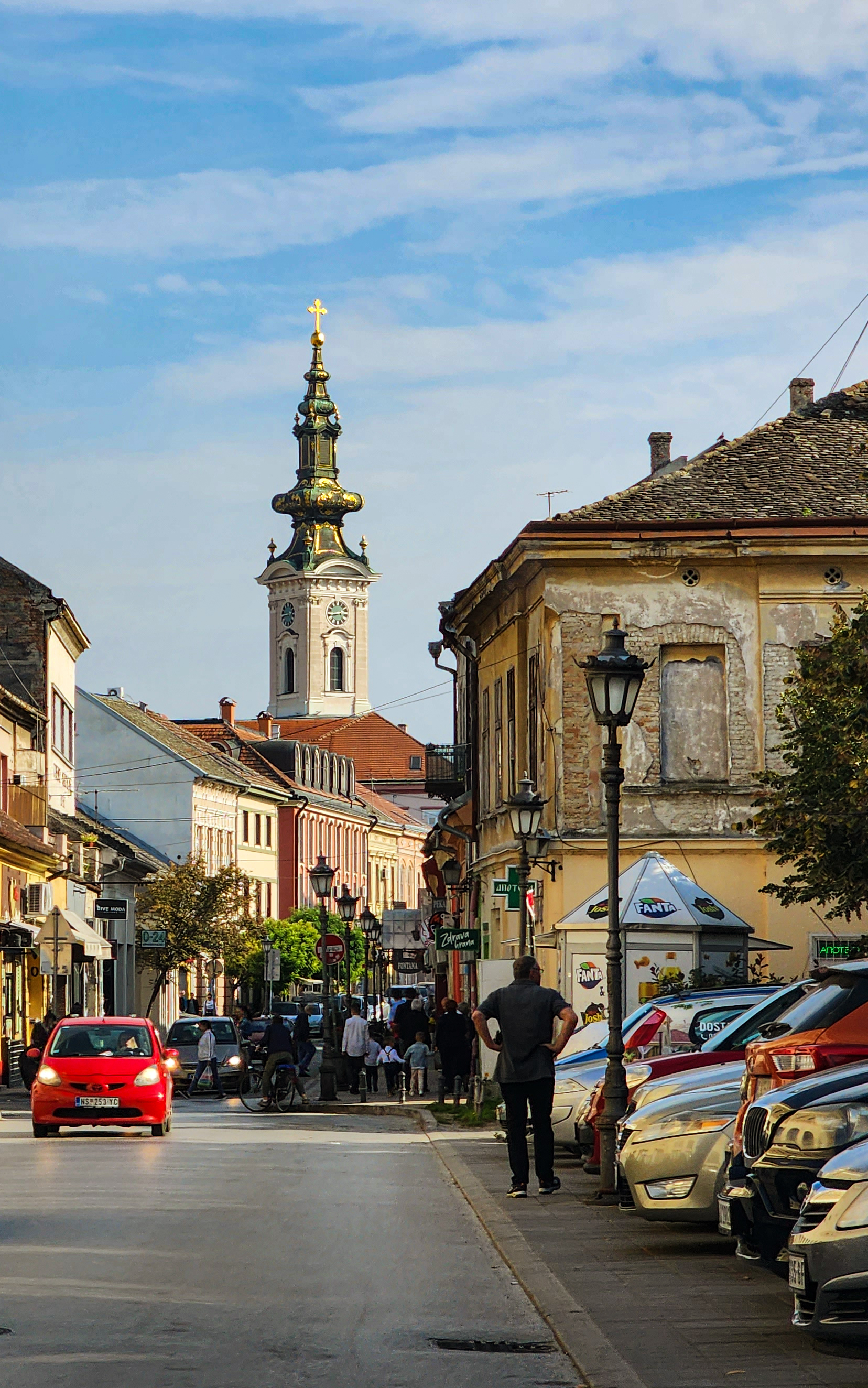
Saint George Cathedral viewed from Nikole Pašića street

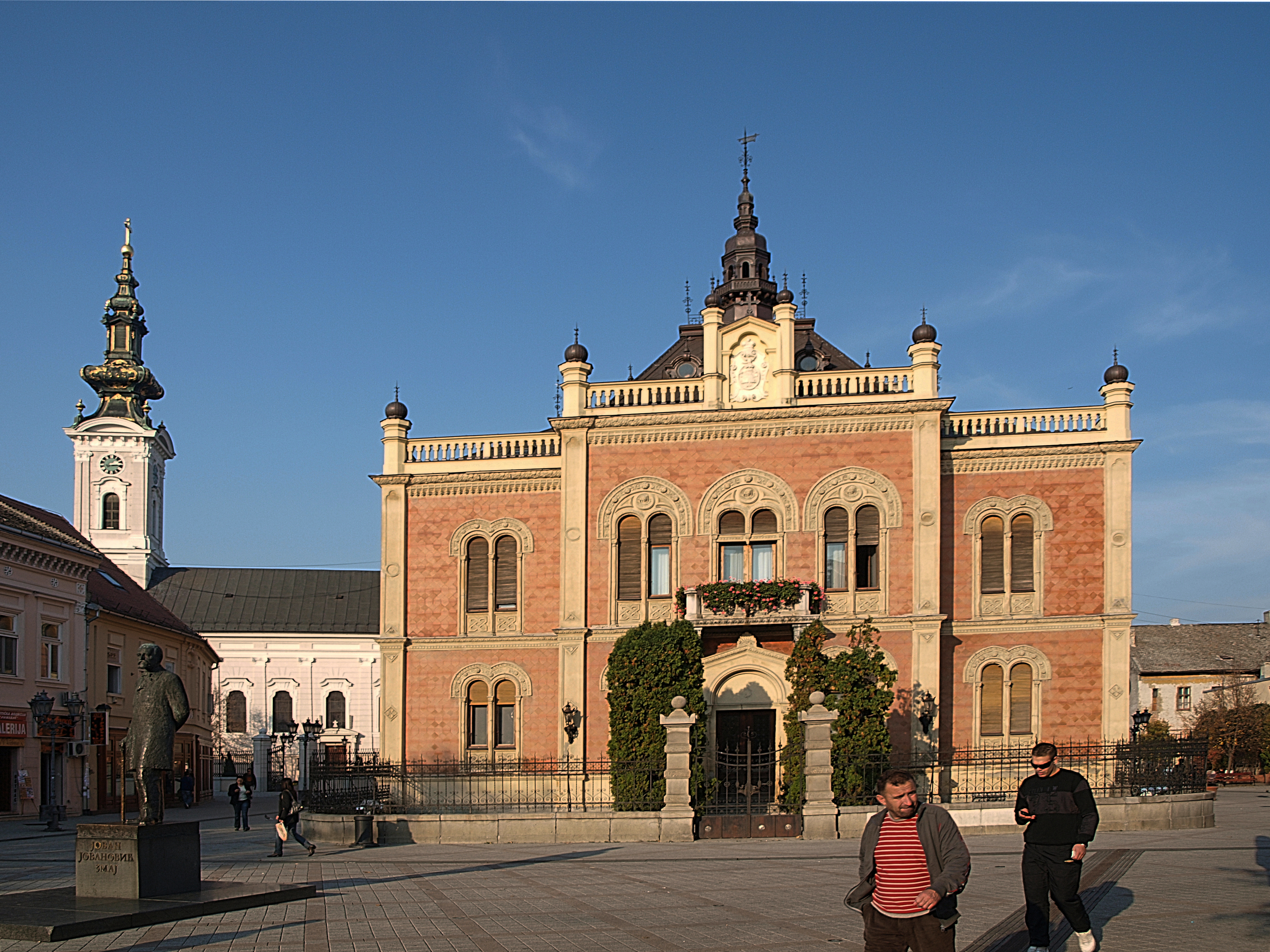
Saint George Cathedral behind the Bishop's Palace viewed from Zmaj Jovina street

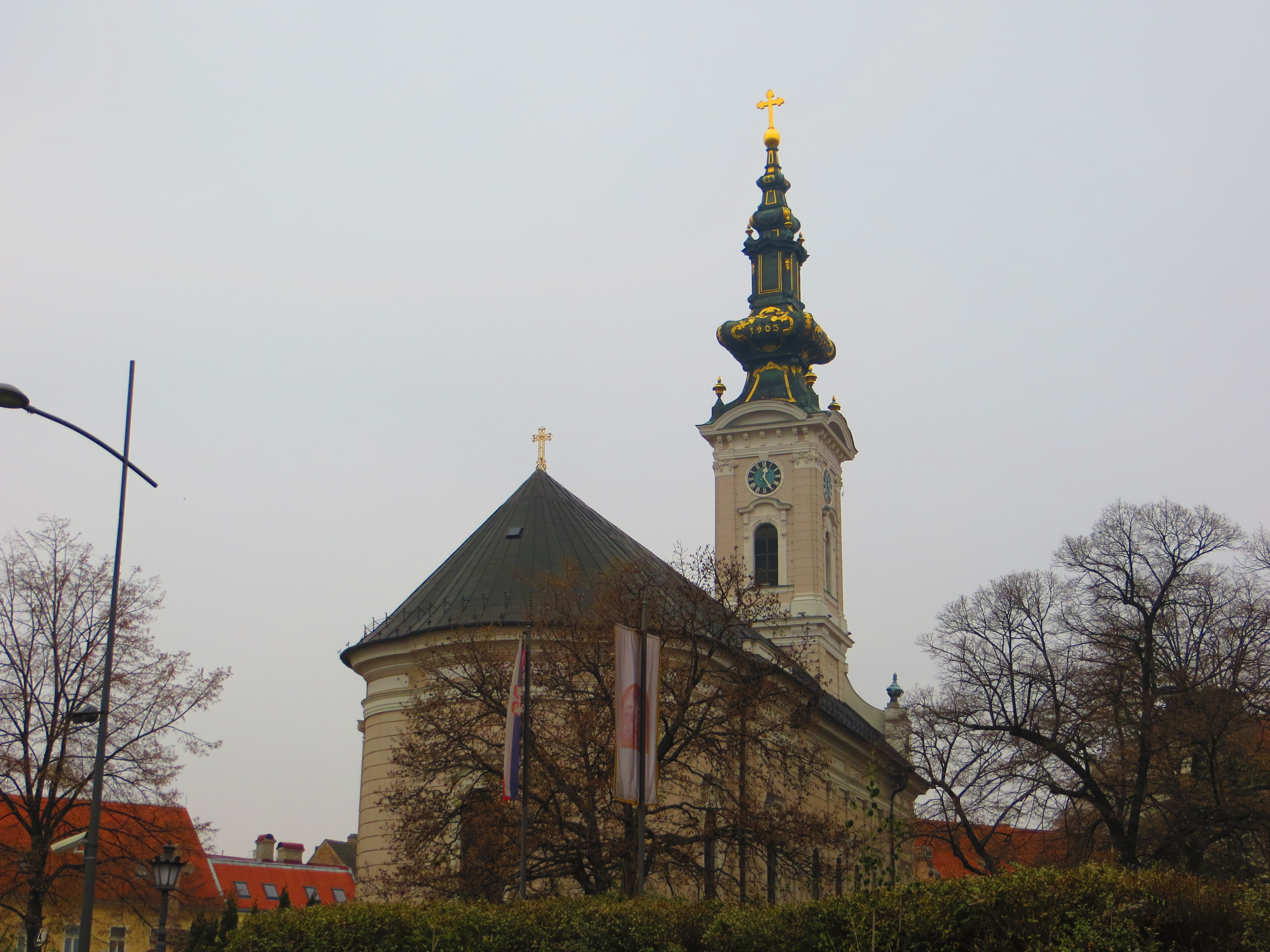
Saint George Cathedral viewed from Republic Square

== See also ==
- List of cathedrals in Serbia
