= Stefan Stanković =

Serbian Orthodox bishop

- Metropolitan of Karlovci
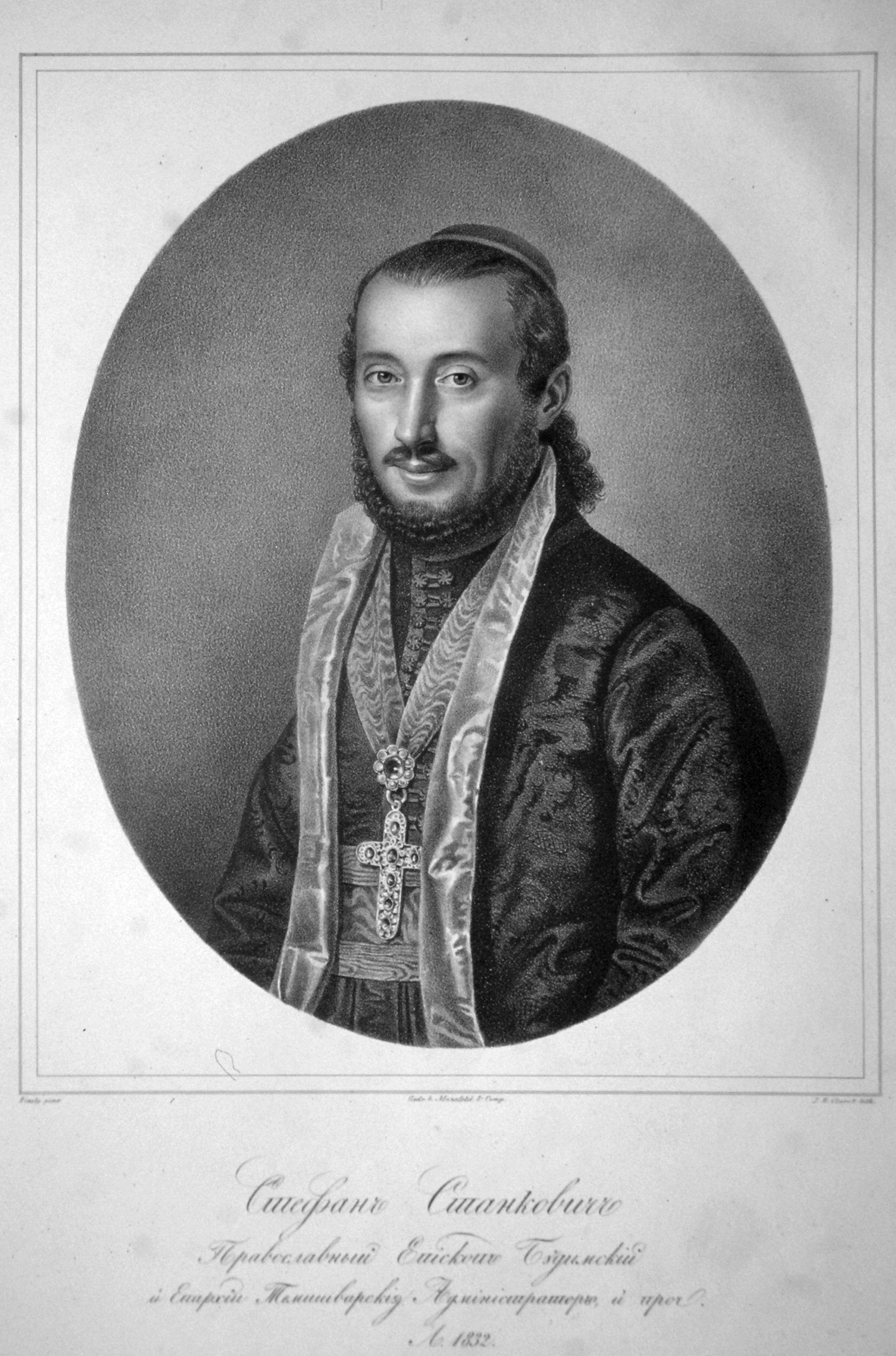
- In office: 1837–1841
- Predecessor: Stefan Stratimirović
- Successor: Josif Rajačić

Personal details
- Born: June 24, 1788 Karlovci, Slavonian Military Frontier, Habsburg monarchy
- Died: July 31, 1841 (aged 53) Karlovci, Slavonian Military Frontier, Austrian Empire

Stefan Stanković (Serbian: Стефан Станковић; Sremski Karlovci, Austrian Empire, 24 June 1788 - Sremski Karlovci, Austrian Empire, 31 July 1841) was a Serbian Orthodox bishop from the Eparchy of Buda and Metropolitan of Karlovci from 1836 to 1841, succeeding Stefan Stratimirović. He was succeeded by Metropolitan Josif Rajačić.

== Biography ==
He was born in Sremski Karlovci to parents Stojko and Pelagija. He completed his high school education in Sremski Karlovci and the Faculty of Philosophy at the University of Pest. In 1807 Metropolitan Stefan Stratimirović appointed him professor in Karlovci. He was ordained deacon on 25 December 1808 by the Bishop Josif Putnik of the Eparchy of Pakrac. Bishop Josif (Putnik) was sympathetic to Stanković and helped him move ahead. Josif took him with him to Croatia, to Pakrac where he received the bishop's throne. He was promoted to the rank of Protodeacon on 15 August 1809 at Lepavina Monastery. He went to the Rakovac monastery where he was initiated in the act of small schima. He was tonsured by the head of the monastery Archimandrite Prokopije Bolić. He was promoted to the rank of Archimandrite of Orahovac on 13 July 1819.

He was elected bishop of Buda at a consecration ceremony in Sremski Karlovci on 20 January 1829 presided by Metropolitan Stefan Stratimirović with the bishops of Timișoara Josif and Gideon of Bačka. In his honour, Adam Dragosavljević wrote an ode in 1829 that was the second book published in Vuk Karadžić's reformed language. Prota Stamatović dedicated his almanac Serbska pčela ("The Serbian Bee") to Metropolitan Stefan (Stanković), initiated in 1830. He was appointed Bishop of Bačka on 30 September 1834. He loved playing bagpipes.

After the death of Stefan Stratimirović, he was elected Metropolitan of Karlovac on 23 November 1837. During his reign as Metropolitan, he provided scholarships for 12 young men, including the painter Dimitrije Avramović. He died in Sremski Karlovci in 1841, where he was buried in the Cathedral Church.

== See also ==
- Metropolitanate of Karlovci
- List of heads of the Serbian Orthodox Church

== Sources ==
- Vuković, Sava (1996). Српски јерарси од деветог до двадесетог века [Serbian Hierarchs from the Ninth to the Twentieth Century] (in Serbian). Evro.

Eastern Orthodox Church titles
Preceded by Dionisije Popović	Bishop of Buda; 1829–1834	Succeeded by Pantelejmon Živković
Preceded by Gedeon Petrović	Bishop of Bačka; 1834–1837	Succeeded by Georgije Hranislav
Preceded by Stefan Stratimirović	Metropolitan of Karlovci; 1836–1841	Succeeded by Josif Rajačić
