= Josif Putnik =

Serbian Orthodox bishop

Josif Putnik (Secular name Jovan Putnik, 28 December 1777 – 4 November 1830) was the bishop of the Serbian Orthodox Church on the throne of the bishops of Pakrac and Timișoara.

== Life ==
Josif Putnik (in the world Jovan) was born in 1777 in Novi Sad to the parents of Dimitrije, a court member, and Marija, born Saplonca and Teodora. He was Jovan "grandson" of Karlovac Metropolitan Mojsije Putnik. The family Hungarian nobility was given to Vojislav (Albert) and Jovan Putnik from Bačka County in 1736. After graduating from the University of Pest, Jovan enrolled in the Karlovac seminary and graduated in 1798. According to the practice of that time, he became a deacon in celibacy at the court of Metropolitan Stefan (Stratimirović), who gathered learned people around him.

He received the monastic rank in the monastery of Krušedol in 1800. As a confidential person, on the order of Metropolitan Stefan (Stratimirović), he mediated for the Tican's rebellion in Srem to end in a peaceful way. For some time, he taught at the Serbian Orthodox High School in Karlovac, as the third professor in a row, succeeding Peter (Jovanović) and Gideon (Petrović), who were also elected bishops.

After the death of the Bishop of Vršac, Josip (Jovanović Šakabenta) (19 December 1805), he became the mandatary and then the administrator of the Diocese of Vršac.

As Archimandrite of Grgeteg Monastery, he became an administrator on 16 August 1807, and on 12 July 1808, the (thirteenth) bishop of the Diocese of Pakrac. Although he was the bishop of Pakrac from 1808 to 1828, Bishop Josif lived in Pakrac for only eleven years. Before that, he lived in Arad for nine years, where, as the last Serbian archbishop, he administered a vacant Arad diocese.

In 1829, Bishop Josif was elected Bishop of Timișoara. He was portrayed in 1830 by the Timișoara painter Sava Petrović. He died on 4 November 1830 and was buried in the Ascension Cathedral in Timișoara.

Bishop Josif was an exceptional person. His main goal was the education and enlightenment of the clergy because that is where the people's goodwill and image come from. To that end, he opened a mandatory boarding school for students of a theological school, which was well organized.

Eastern Orthodox Church titles
Preceded by Kiril ŽIvković	Bishop of Pakrac; 1808–1828	Succeeded by Georgije Hranislav
Preceded by Stefan Avakuvmović	Bishop of Temišvar; 1829–1830	Succeeded by Maksim Manulović
