= Emanuil Antonovich =

Serbian icon painter

Emanuil Manojlo Antonović also spelled Emanuel Antonovich (Serbian Cyrillic: Емануил Манојло Антоновић; Orlovat, c. 1785 – Timișoara, Habsburg monarchy, 21 January 1829) was a Serbian icon painter and goldsmith from the region of Banat.

== Biography ==
Emanuil Antonović was born around 1785 in Orlovat, a Banat military frontier border town. He came from a trading family, whose representatives lived and worked in Čakovo, and Timișoara's suburb of Fabric (Fabrika). He was the son of Antonije, an Orlovac buyer (merchant). He was married to Juliana, who died in Timișoara in 1829.

Manojlo was educated in Timișoara in the 1790s, and later from 1816 until his death he lived in the Serbian suburb of Fabrika, in the city of Timișoara. He died on 21 January 1829 in Timișoara, where he was buried.

It is not known where and with whom he studied icon painting and gilding probably in nearby Veliki Bečkerek. He was more of an artistic craftsman than an academic artist. He belonged to the artistic epoch of the transition period.

Manojlo was a close associate of the famous Timișoara icon painter Sava Petrović. They worked together in a temple in the Timișoara suburb of Mehala from 1819 to 1820 and Parac. Antonović gilded the iconostasis in the Mehala Serbian Orthodox Church.

Manojlo Antonović worked for the churches in Đir (1817), the most extensive work in Ketfelj (1821–1825), Mehala (1819–1820), Parac (1828) and Fabrika (1821; 1828–1829).
