= Sava Petrović (painter) =

Serbian icon painter

Sava Petrović (Serbian Cyrillic: Сава Петровић) (Jazvin, Banat, Austrian Empire, former Holy Roman Empire, 1788 – Timișoara, Austrian Empire, 9 June 1857) was a Serbian icon painter and portraitist. He was the father of international portraitist Pavel Petrović, the globetrotter.

He lived and worked in Temisvar but travelled whenever he received commissions to paint icons or portraits. His well-known works are portraits of Bishop Josif Putnik, done in 1830; Josif Rajačić, completed in 1850; and restoration work of a portrait of Bishop Sofronije Kirilović in 1846. Petrovic was a contemporary of icon painter Arsenije Teodorović and master carvers Arsenije and Aksentije Marković who worked in the Fenek Monastery.

== Biography ==
Petrović was born in 1788 in the village of Jazvina in Banat. He had sons Nikola, Vladimir and Pavel, who became a well-known international painter, though now mostly forgotten. Petrović was a recognized portraitist and icon painter.

He was a student of Arsenije Teodorović, from whom he copied some motives. As a portraitist, he was basically a classicist, who is not always sure of drawing, and who tends to replace his formal shortcomings with warm and tender colours. In his mature years, he settled permanently in the Serbian suburb of Fabrika in the city of Timisoara, Timiș County.

In 1812, Petrović worked in the Orthodox Church in Variaș, together with goldsmith Jovan Bondin. When he married, he acquired civil rights in Timisoara on 2 December 1815. He lived for many years in Timiș County, a Serbian settlement near Timisoara. On 28 October 1815, he painted a portrait of the Timisoara senator Ferenc Meyer. In 1820, he painted the iconostasis of the Serbian Orthodox Church of the Nativity of the Mother of God in Battonya. In March 1819, he concluded a contract with the church municipality of Mehala to paint the iconostasis in the Nikolajevska (St. Nicholas church) for 10,000 florins. The work started in the same year, during 1819–1820. years. He painted the iconostasis of the Orthodox Church of the summer St. Nikola in Mehala, a suburb of Timisoara, together with Emanuil Antonovich, a goldsmith and painter. In the monastery of Bezdin, in 1822, he decided to paint three wall icons about all the woodwork, stoves and shutters of the monastery temple. He is mentioned in 1822 in Arad, together with Mihail Janić, a woodcarver. It seems that in 1826, the goldsmith Aleksija Teodorović worked with Petrović and Antonović also appeared together in 1828 in Parta, where they cleaned an old iconostasis.

He worked as a painter and secular motifs, several portraits of Orthodox church dignitaries and noble citizens. He painted a portrait of the Bishop of Budva, Justin Jovanović, before 1834, in the Arad County. He also painted other well-known metropolitans, bishops and archimandrites, namely Stefan Stratimirović, Josif Putnik, Nestor Jovanović, Josif Rajačić, August Petrovic, Joanikije Milkovic, Justin Jovanovic, Maksim Milovanovic.

== About son Pavel ==
His son Pavel Petrović (1818–1852) was also a painter. Together with his father, he appeared in Timisoara in 1834 as a subscriber to the Painter, a book by Milovan Vidaković. This confirms that Pavel first studied with his father Sava, in their painting workshop. Unlike his father, Pavel graduated from the Academy of Fine Arts in Vienna (1834–1837). After returning from studies, he married Draginja Popov in Modoš in 1838, and that was the reason why he settled there. He painted the iconostasis in the church of St. Nikola in Modoš in 1839. We find it 1839–1841. Pavel was a representative of the Neoclassicism and proved himself to be the best in painting portraits. Two portraits in Modoš were known to be his work: priest Lazar Popović and his wife Mila. After five years of marriage, when he became "fed up" with family life, Pavel made an agreement with his wife that he would leave home under the obligation to send her and his children (Teodor and Kristina) 300 pounds a year for subsistence. Between 1843 and 1852 alone, Pavel travelled the world; toured all of Europe, India, China. He came back to Europe, to Paris in 1847, where he was greeted with honours. He wrote a letter to his family from Hong Kong in 1850. The following year, 1851, he arrived in America, where he lost all his property and studio in a fire in Los Angeles. His father and Pavel's wife officially sought him out, through consular offices, because he was not fulfilling his obligation to his family.

== Work ==
- Iconostasis in the Serbian Orthodox Church in Varias
- Iconsotasis in the Serbian Orthodox church in Mehala, suburb of Timisoara
- Iconostasis in the Serbian Orthodox church in Bata, Arad
- Iconostasis in the Serbian Orthodox church in Parța
- Iconostasis in the Serbian Orthodox church in Sânnicolau Mare

== Portraits ==
- Portrait of the merchant Spirta, in the National Museum of Pančevo.

Sava Petrović also made portraits of the highest Serbian clerical dignitariest, metropolitans, bishops and archimandrites:

- Portrait of Bishop Justin Jovanovic,
- Portrait of August Petrovic,
- Portrait of Joanikije Milkovic,
- Portrait of Josif Putnik,
- Portrait of Nestor Jovanović,
- Portrait of Maksim Milovanovic,
- Portrait of Stefan Stratimirović,
- Portrait of Josif Rajačić.
