= Eparchy of Bačka =

Diocese of the Serbian Orthodox Church

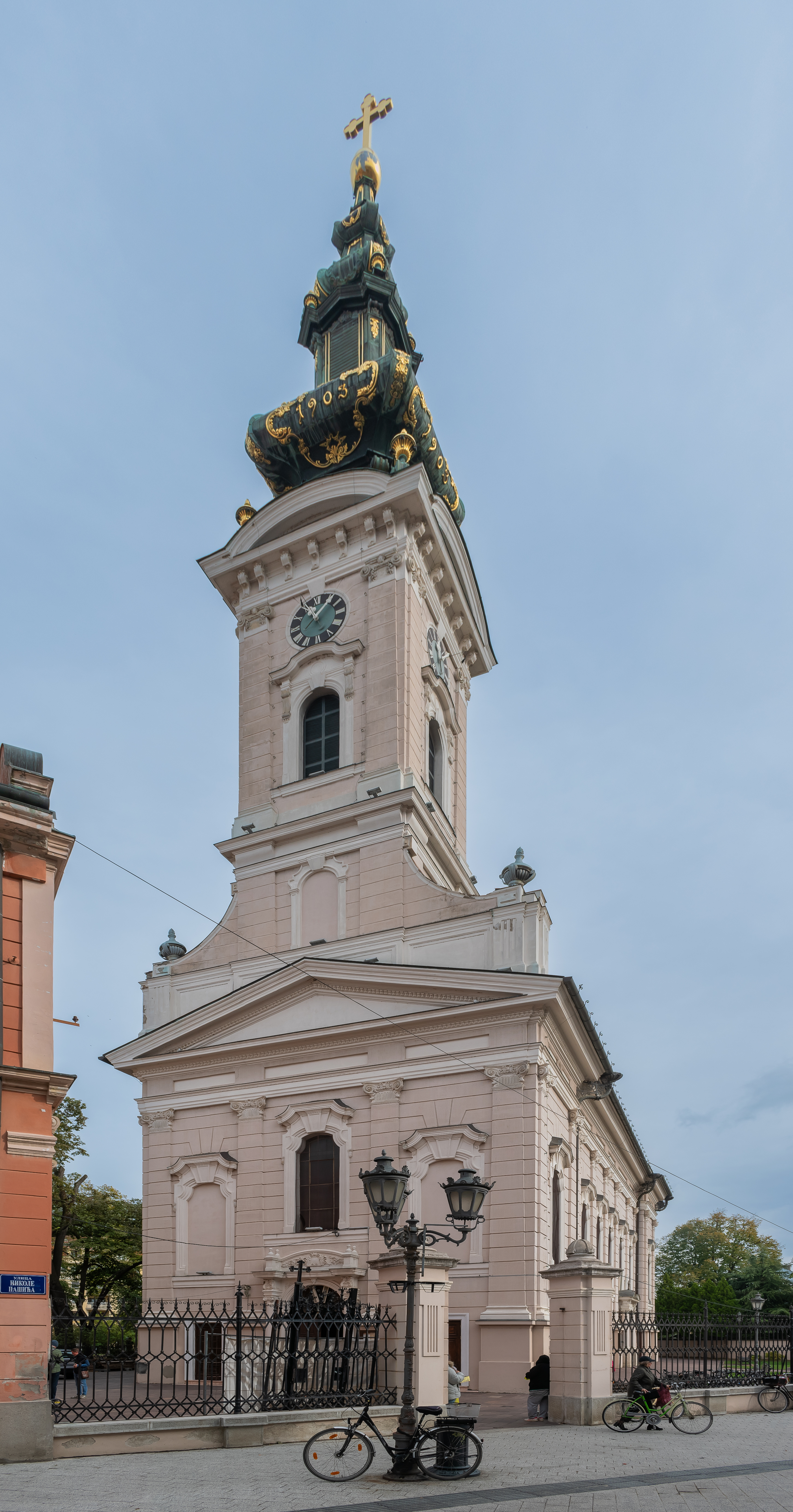
- Saint George Cathedral, Novi Sad

Location
- Territory: Serbian Bačka
- Headquarters: Bishop's Palace, Novi Sad, Serbia

Information
- Denomination: Eastern Orthodox
- Sui iuris church: Serbian Orthodox Church
- Established: 1932
- Cathedral: Saint George Cathedral, Novi Sad
- Language: Church Slavonic, Serbian

Current leadership
- Bishop: Irinej Bulović

Map

Website
- Eparchy of Bačka

The Eparchy of Bačka (Serbian: Епархија бачка, romanized: Eparhija bačka) is a diocese (eparchy) of the Serbian Orthodox Church covering Bačka region in northern Serbia.

The episcopal see is located at the Saint George Cathedral, Novi Sad. Its headquarters and bishop's residence, are also in Novi Sad, both located at the Bishop's Palace.

== History ==
During the Middle Ages, old counties of Bács and Bodrog belonged to the Kingdom of Hungary, that had ambivalent attitudes towards the presence of Eastern Orthodox Christianity in its southern and eastern regions, depending on political relations with the Byzantine Empire, and medieval Serbia. By the end of the 15th century, Serb presence in those regions was gradually enlarged by continuous migrations that were caused by Ottoman invasion of Serbian lands.

The Serbian Orthodox Eparchy of Bačka was established in the 16th century, under the jurisdiction of the Serbian Patriarchate of Peć. In the beginning, the seat of the bishop was in Szeged, the capital city of the Ottoman Sanjak of Segedin. Diocesan seat was later moved to various monasteries in Bačka proper, and was finally stabilized in Novi Sad in the beginning of the 18th century. By that time, the region of Bačka was liberated from Ottoman rule and incorporated into the Habsburg monarchy. Since 1708, the eparchy belonged to the Metropolitanate of Karlovci, independent (autocephalous) after 1766 (it became the Patriarchate of Karlovci in 1848). After World War I and the creation of the Kingdom of Yugoslavia, its territory was united with other Serbian ecclesiastical provinces to form the unified Serbian Orthodox Church, a process completed in 1920.

== List of bishops ==
- Filip
- Sava
- Makarije
- Simeon
- Georgije (1579)
- Mardarije (1609)
- Mihailo (1651)
- Georgije (1667)
- Jeftimije Drobnjak (1695–1708)
- Stevan Metohijac (1708–1709)
- Hristofor Dimitrijević-Mitrović (1710–1712)
- Grigorije Dimitrijević (1713–1717)
- Sofronije Tomašević (1718–1730)
- Visarion Pavlović (1731–1756)
- Mojsije Putnik (1757–1774)
- Arsenije Radivojević (1774–1781)
- Atanasije Živković (1781–1782)
- Josif Jovanović Šakabenta (1783–1786)
- Jovan Jovanović (1786–1805)
- Gedeon Petrović (1807–1832)
- Stefan Stanković (1834–1837)
- Georgije Hranislav (1839–1843)
- Platon Atanacković (1851–1867)
- German Anđelić (1874–1882)
- Vasilijan Petrović (1885–1891)
- German Opačić (1893–1899)
- Mitrofan Šević (1900–1918)
- Irinej Ćirić (1922–1955)
- Nikanor Iličić (1955–1986)
- Irinej Bulović (1990–present)

== Notable monasteries ==
- Kovilj
- Bođani
- Sombor

== Gallery ==
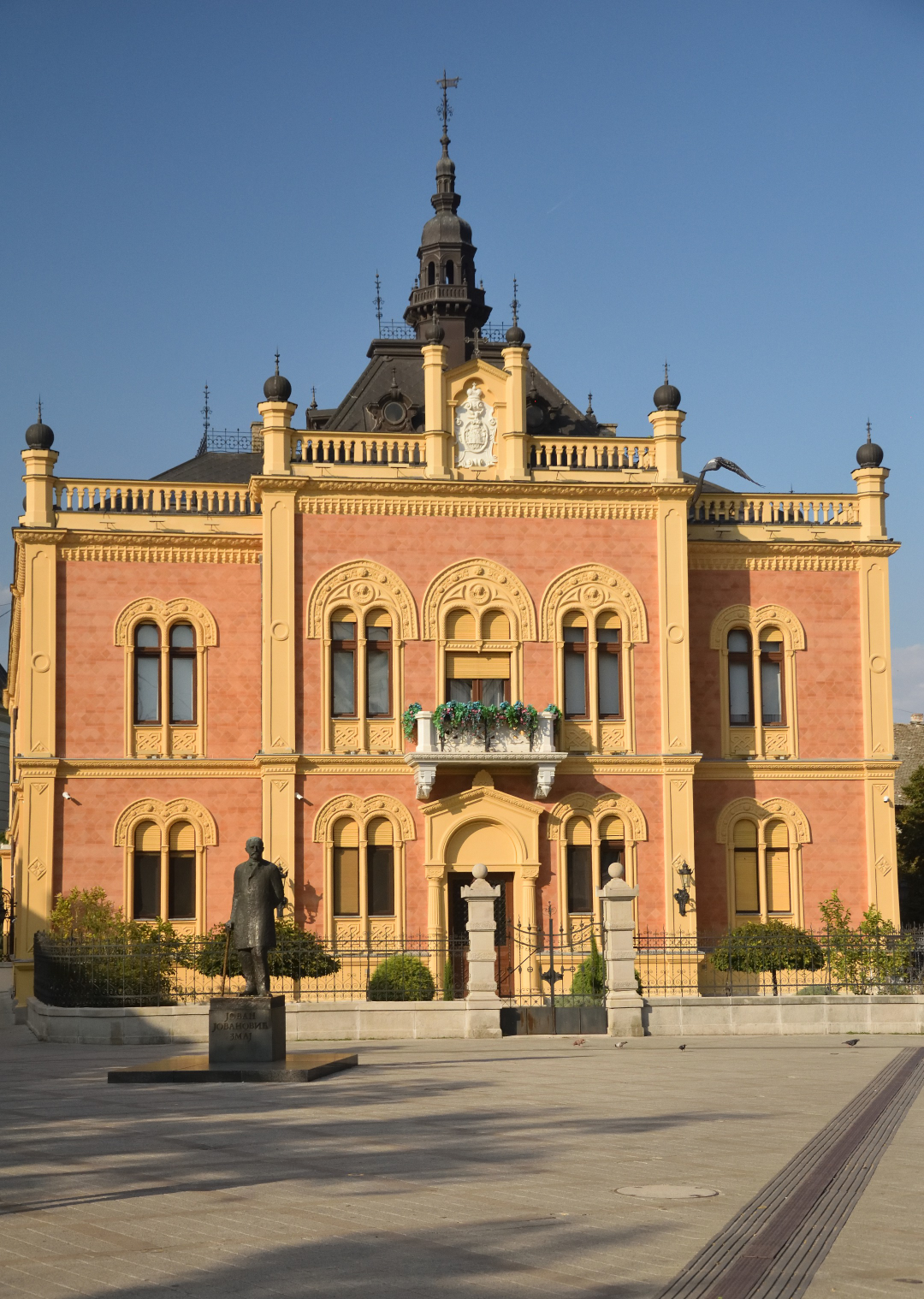
Bishop's Palace

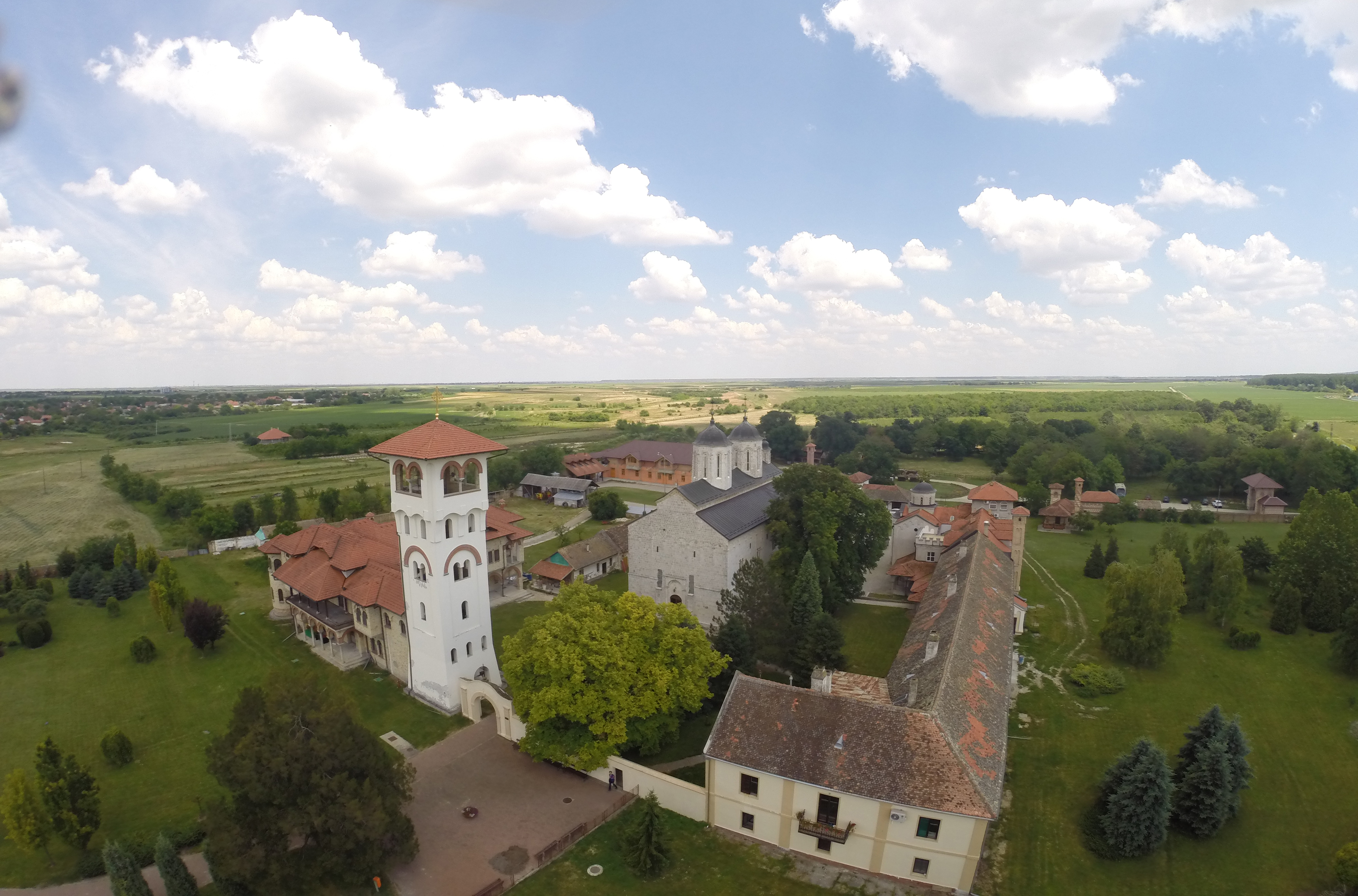
Kovilj Monastery

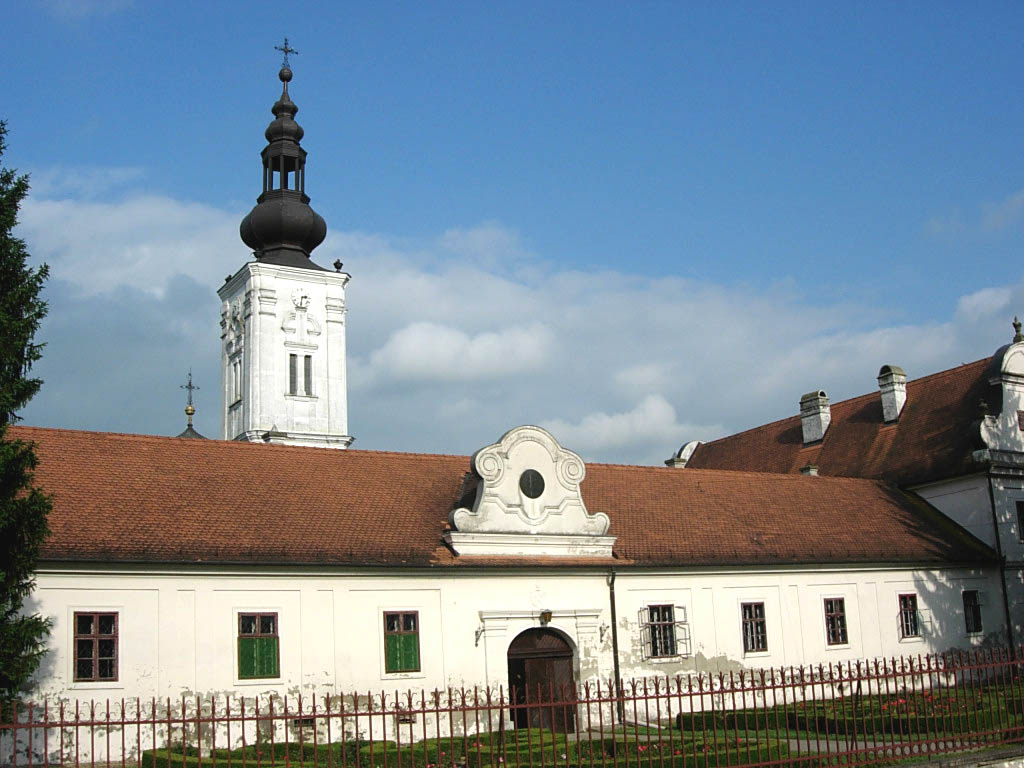
Bođani Monastery

== See also ==
- Eparchies and metropolitanates of the Serbian Orthodox Church

== Sources ==
- Baán, István (1999). "The Metropolitanate of Tourkia: The Organization of the Byzantine Church in Hungary in the Middle Ages". Byzanz und Ostmitteleuropa 950-1453. Wiesbaden: Harrassowitz Verlag. pp. 45–53.
- Bataković, Dušan T., ed. (2005). Histoire du peuple serbe [History of the Serbian People] (in French). Lausanne: L’Age d’Homme.
- Ćirković, Sima (2004). The Serbs. Malden: Blackwell Publishing. ISBN 9781405142915.
- Gavrilović, Slavko (1993). "Serbs in Hungary, Slavonia and Croatia in struggles against the Turks (15th–18th centuries)". Serbs in European Civilization. Belgrade: Nova, Serbian Academy of Sciences and Arts, Institute for Balkan Studies. pp. 41–54.
- Isailović, Neven G.; Krstić, Aleksandar R. (2015). "Serbian Language and Cyrillic Script as a Means of Diplomatic Literacy in South Eastern Europe in 15th and 16th Centuries" (PDF). Literacy Experiences concerning Medieval and Early Modern Transylvania. Cluj-Napoca: George Bariţiu Institute of History. pp. 185–195. Archived from the original on 2024-06-07.
- Sotirović, Vladislav B. (2011). "The Serbian Patriarchate of Peć in the Ottoman Empire: The First Phase (1557–94)" (PDF). Serbian Studies. 25 (2): 143–169. Archived from the original (PDF) on 2016-08-10.
- Točanac-Radović, Isidora (2018). "Belgrade - Seat of the Archbishopric and Metropolitanate (1718–1739)". Belgrade 1521-1867. Belgrade: The Institute of History. pp. 155–167.
