= Georgije Hranislav =

Bishop of the Servian Orthodox church

Georgije Hransislav (secular Gavrilo Hranislav; 8 November 1775 - 22 June 1843) was the bishop of the Serbian Orthodox Church.

== Biography ==
Bishop Georgije was born as Gavrilo Hranislav in Ruma on 8 November 1775, to father Pavle and mother Alka. He studied basic sciences with local teachers in Ruma. In the period 1787–1791, he attended a Slav-Serbian school. He studied high school in Karlovac and Novi Sad, and then was at the academy in Varaždin, listening to philosophy. In the end, he attended postgraduate classes in law and philosophy in Pest and Vienna.

== Monastic life ==
From 1804, Gavrilo Hranislav was a professor at the grammar school in Karlovac until 1812, when Metropolitan Stefan Stratimirović promoted him to the rank of deacon on 6 October, and then protodeacon on 31 January 1813 and archdeacon on 21 November 1814. He became a close associate of the Metropolitan Stefan.

Gavrilo Hranislav accepted monasticism on 11 January 1816 in the monastery of Krušedol by the archimandrite of the monastery Dimitrije (Krestić), who gave him the name Georgije. He was ordained a presbyter on 2 June 1818, and on 21 November he was made protosingel by Metropolitan Stefan.

He was elevated to the rank of Archimandrite of Rakovac by the Bishop of Pakrac, Josif Putnik, on 28 November 1821. Until 1827, he was a professor of theology in Karlovac. At the same time, he was an assistant to the metropolitan and a member of many bodies and commissions. During this time, he paid special attention to the Rakovec Monastery, which was then completely renovated.

== Episcopal vocation ==
On 24 January 1829, Archimandrite Georgije was consecrated Bishop of Pakrac, since the former Bishop Josef (Putnik) moved to the Timisoara Cathedral. Bishop Georgije remained there for a decade.

In 1839, Bishop Georgije was transferred to the Diocese of Bačka on 26 May. With the death of Metropolitan Stefan Stanković, he administered the Metropolitanate of Karlovci in the period from 31 July 1841 until the election of the new Metropolitan in 1842.

Bishop Georgije was a very educated man of his time and had a penchant for literature, translating, writing and collecting books. His contemporaries were men of letters such as Sava Mrkalj, Jovan Muškatirović, Sava Tekelija, Lukijan Mušicki, Pavle Solarić, and Jovan Savić.

In addition, he helped the poor and educated young people. He translated a German cookbook into Serbian in 1804.

Georgije Hranislav died on 22 June 1843. He was buried in the Cathedral of the Serbian Orthodox Church of Novi Sad

Eastern Orthodox Church titles
Preceded by Josif Putnik	Bishop of Pakrac; 1829–1839	Succeeded by Stefan Popović
Preceded by Stefan Stanković	Bishop of Bačka; 1839–1843	Succeeded by Arsenije Stojković
