= Bukovac, Novi Sad =

Bukovac Буковац (Serbian)
- Suburban settlement
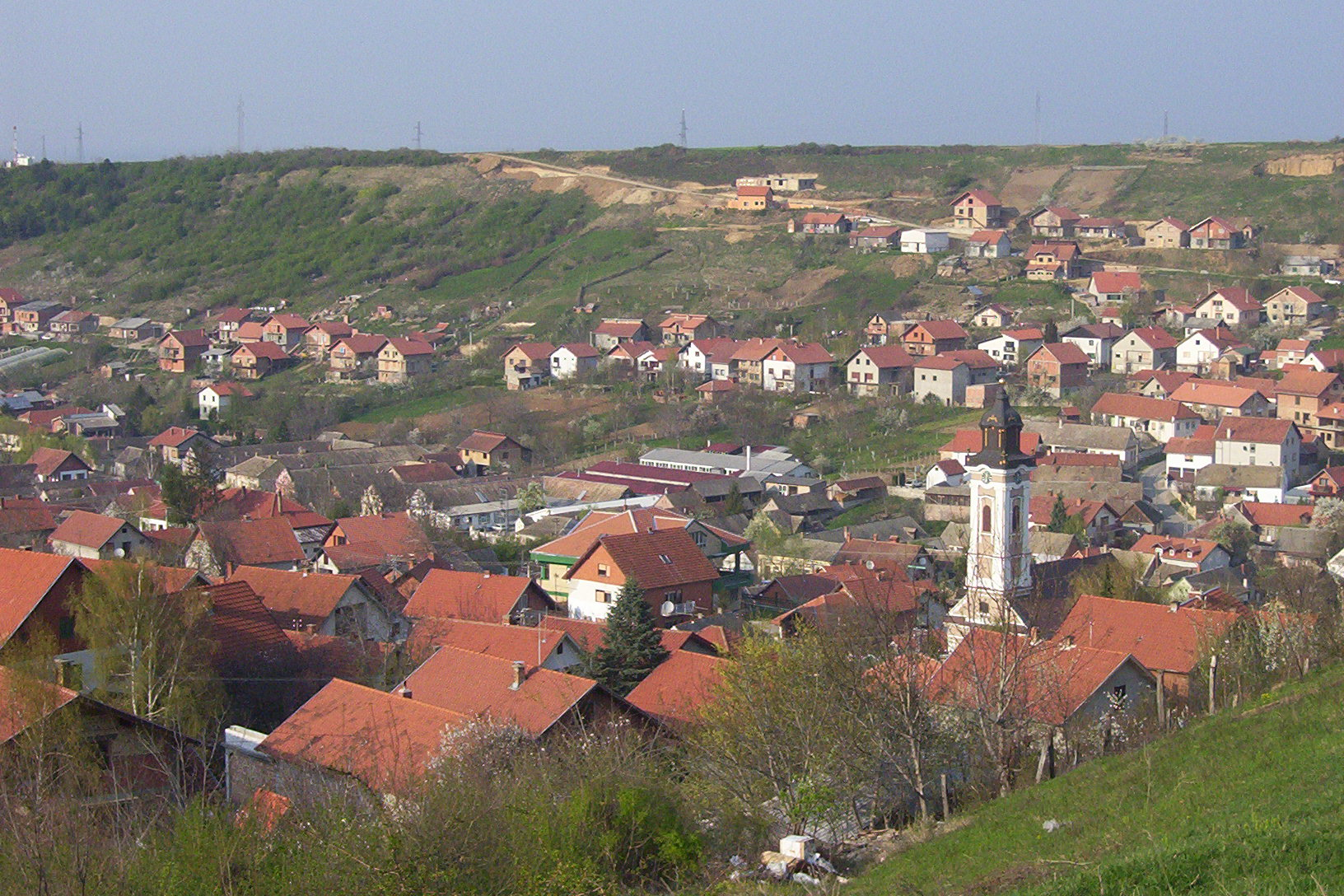
- View of the church in Bukovac from a hill

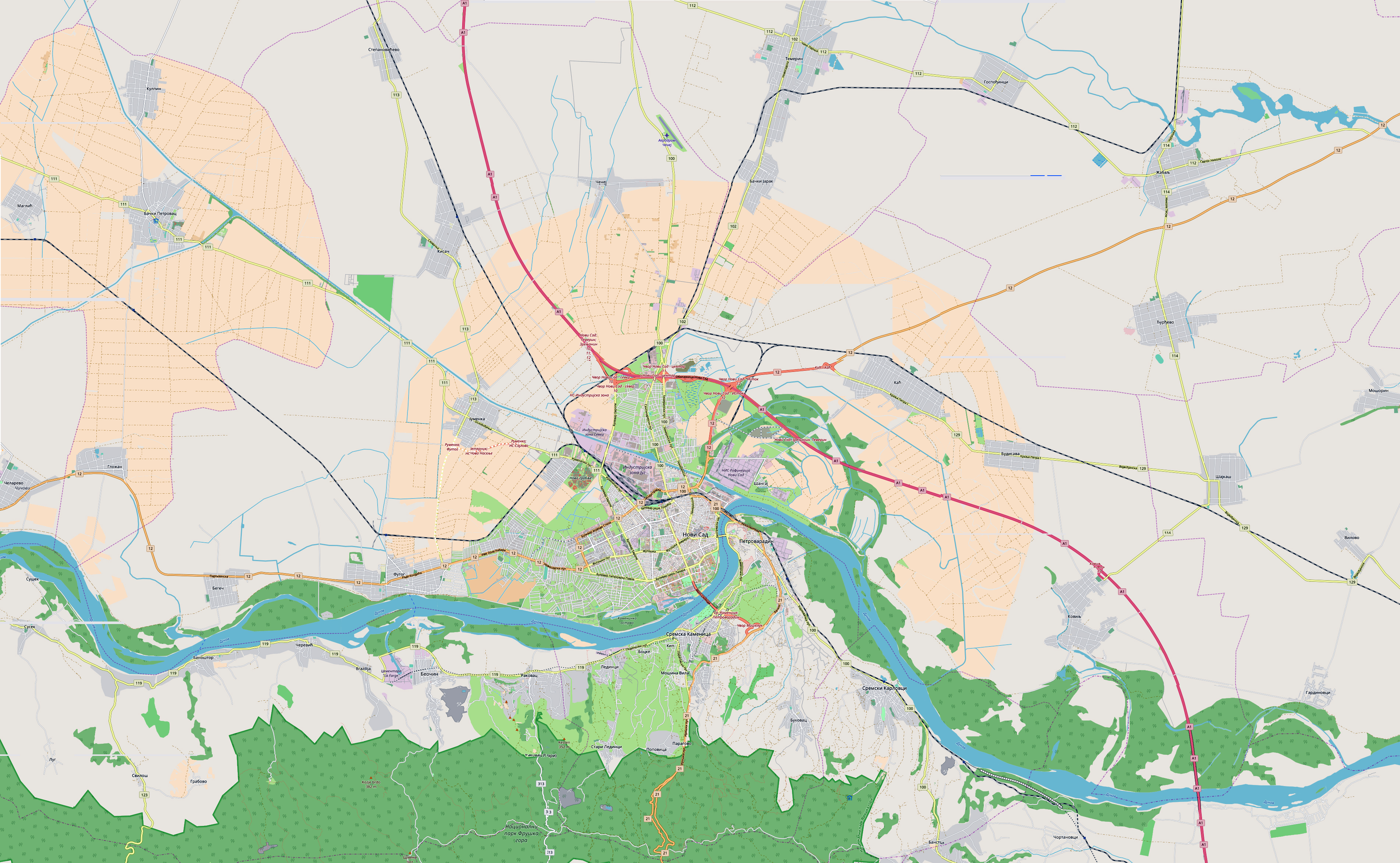
- Location in Serbia Bukovac (Vojvodina) Bukovac (Serbia)
- Coordinates: 45°11′28″N 19°53′41″E
- Country: Serbia
- Province: Vojvodina
- District: South Bačka
- Municipality: Petrovaradin

Area
  - Total: 13.93 km^{2} (5.38 sq mi)

Population
  - Total: 3,936
- Time zone: UTC+1
- Area code: + 381(0)21

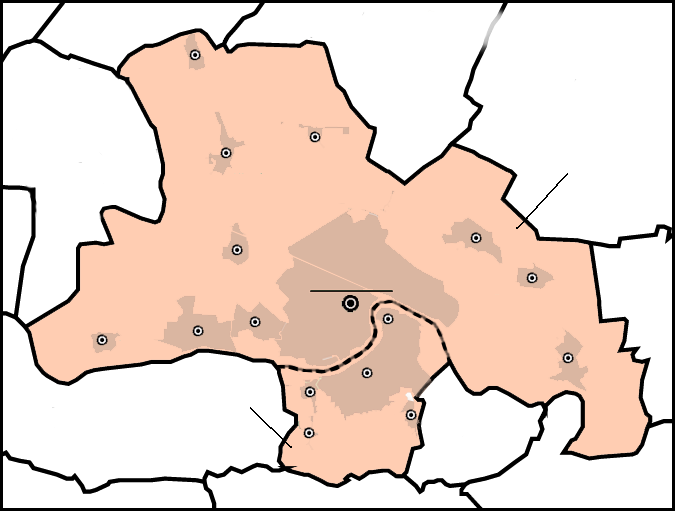

Bukovac (Serbian Cyrillic: Буковац) is a suburban settlement of the city of Novi Sad, Serbia. It is located in the Petrovaradin municipality.

== The name ==
The name Bukovac is thought to be derived from bukva ('beech'). The legend says that when the first settlers settled where now village's center is, there was an old beech so they named the place Bukovac upon that tree.

== Geography ==
The village is situated on the foothills of Fruška Gora mountain, and it is part of the metropolitan area of Novi Sad Around 9 kilometers from Novi Sad city center. Bukovački potok (Bukovac Stream) flows through Bukovac.

== History, culture and education ==
Illyrian tumuli and necropolis have been unearthed in Bukovac, which was founded during the Ottoman rule in the 16th century by Serb settlers.

There is a Serbian Orthodox church of Vaznesenja dating from the 18th century. Ornamental and artistic work in the church is attributed to engraver Marko Vujatović, painters Stefan Gavrilović, Jakov Orfelin, Teodor Kračun and Dimitrije Bačević. There is one elementary school (grades 1-8) and kindergarten.

== Demographics ==
Historical population
| Year | Pop. | ±% |
|---|---|---|
| 1948 | 865 | — |
| 1953 | 859 | −0.7% |
| 1961 | 1,329 | +54.7% |
| 1971 | 2,012 | +51.4% |
| 1981 | 2,641 | +31.3% |
| 1991 | 3,040 | +15.1% |
| 2002 | 3,595 | +18.3% |
| 2011 | 3,936 | +9.5% |
Source: Census

== Notable people ==
- Stjepan Đureković, Croatian businessman
- Boris Kovač, Serbian musician
- Milica Stojadinović-Srpkinja (1830–1878), Serbian writer and poet

== See also ==
- List of places in Serbia
- List of cities, towns and villages in Vojvodina
