= Lazar Serdanović =

Serbian painter

Lazar Serdanović (Serbian: Лазар Сердановић; 1744 in Sombor, Habsburg monarchy – 1799 in Sombor, Habsburg Monarchy) was a Serbian painter. He was part of a group of painters representative of the high Baroque style, consisting of Grigorije Davidović-Obšić, Mojsije Subotić, Grigorije Jezdimirović and himself.

Little known Sombor painter from the Baroque period, Lazar Serdanović, was active mostly in Orthodox churches in Srem and Slavonia. He is most remembered for the icons he painted with colleagues Teodor Kračun and Jovan Isailović (Sr.) in Sombor's Serbian Orthodox Church of St. George (Crkva Svetog Đorđa) which is in mixed Baroque, Roccoco, and Classic styles. He also painted the iconostasis in a Serbian church in Mikluševcima, near Vukovar, in the 1770s.

== See also ==
- List of painters from Serbia
- Serbian art
