= Mihailo Bokorić =

Serbian painter

Mihailo Bokorić also spelled Bukorović or Bukurović (Serbian Cyrillic: Михајло Бокорић; Biskupija near Knin, Dalmatia around 1730 - Pečka, Austrian Empire, 6 November 1817) was a Serbian painter, portraitist, and iconographer.

== Biography ==
He moved from Dalmatia to Lika and then to Banat. He married in Pečka near Arad, and spent most of his life there and worked for the Orthodox churches in Pomorišje. In his time he was a famous and sought after as a painter, iconographer and portraitist.

According to tradition, he learned painting from Georgije Tenecki (or Stefan Tenecki). It is believed that the iconostasis of the Romanian, though formerly Serbian, church in Pečka is his work. And there are icons, the "seal" of the "Holy Trinity" and the "Mother of God", from him made for the temples in the monasteries of Bezdin, in Srpski Sveti Petar (1781), Nađlak (1828), Vašarhelj (1787) and Modoš. There are also a large number of his works held by individual families, and there are several of his portraits in Bezdin Monastery.

== Literature ==
- Serbian Zion, 1901
- Serbian Family Encyclopedia, Volume 4; Narodna knjiga, Politika NM; years. 2006. ISBN 978-86-331-2733-2.
- Borčić, Vera (1989). "BOKORIĆ, Mihailo (Bokorović, Bukorović, Bukurović)". Croatian Biographical Lexicon.
