= Georgije Mišković =

Serbian artist

Georgije Mišković was a Serbian icon painter during the Serbian Baroque period of the 1760s and the 1790s. He worked on commissions with painters Teodor Kračun, Grigorije Davidović-Obšić and many others.

Georgije Mišković was a proponent of European Neoclassicism in the visual arts, founded on the concepts of Enlightenment that followed Baroque but did little to compete with late Baroque. Such tendencies also came to the fore in paintings of other Serbian artists, namely Stefan Gavrilović, Mihajlo Živković and Jovan Isailović.
