= Calma (disambiguation) =

Calma is a former vendor of digitizers and minicomputer-based graphics systems.

Calma may also refer to:

- Čalma, a village in Serbia
- Calma (gastropod), a genus of sea slugs
- "Calma" (song), by Pedro Capó, 2018
- Hector Calma, Filipino basketball player
- Juan Carlo Calma, Filipino visual artist and architect
- Tom Calma, Aboriginal Australian human rights and social justice campaigner
