= Jovan Isailović =

Serbian painter

Virgin Mary-immaculate, 1785

Jovan Isailović Sr. (1756–1825) was a Serbian icon and mural painter who lived and worked in the late eighteenth century and early nineteenth century.

== Biography ==
In 1772 he started painting an iconostasis in the Church of St. George in Sombor with fellow painters Teodor Kračun and Lazar Serdanović. The iconostasis in the Serbian Orthodox Monastery of Saint George, better known as Sveti Đurađ monastery in Romanian Banat, is also linked to Jovan Isailović Senior, dating from 1803 to 1804, and presenting a strong Byzantine influence. Isailović Senior also worked with his colleague painter Janko Halkozović. Many of the iconostasis and icons attributed to him were pillaged during World War II.

== Gallery ==
Virgin Mary-immaculate, (1780)

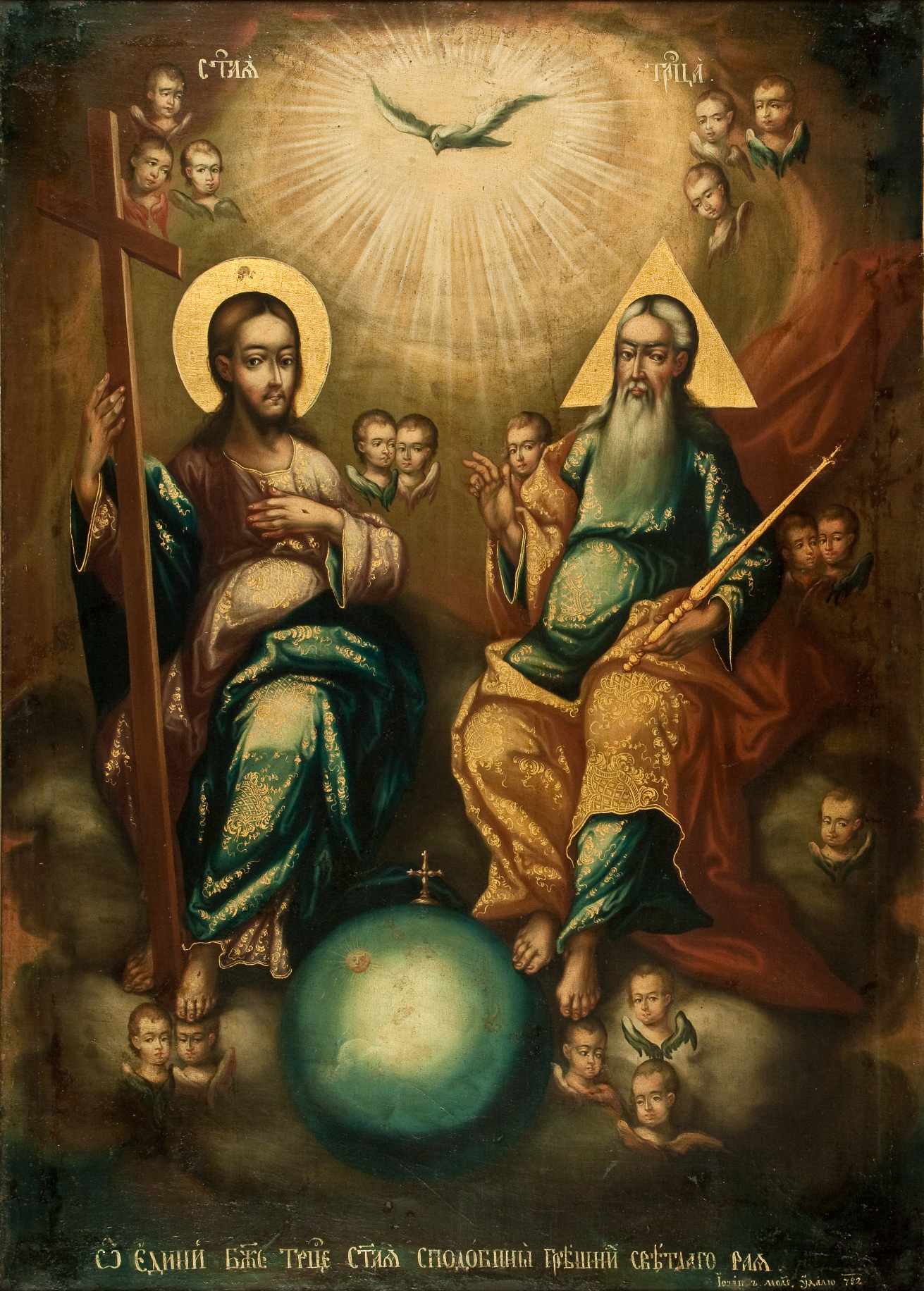
Holy Trinity, (1782)

Nikola Virovac, (1790)

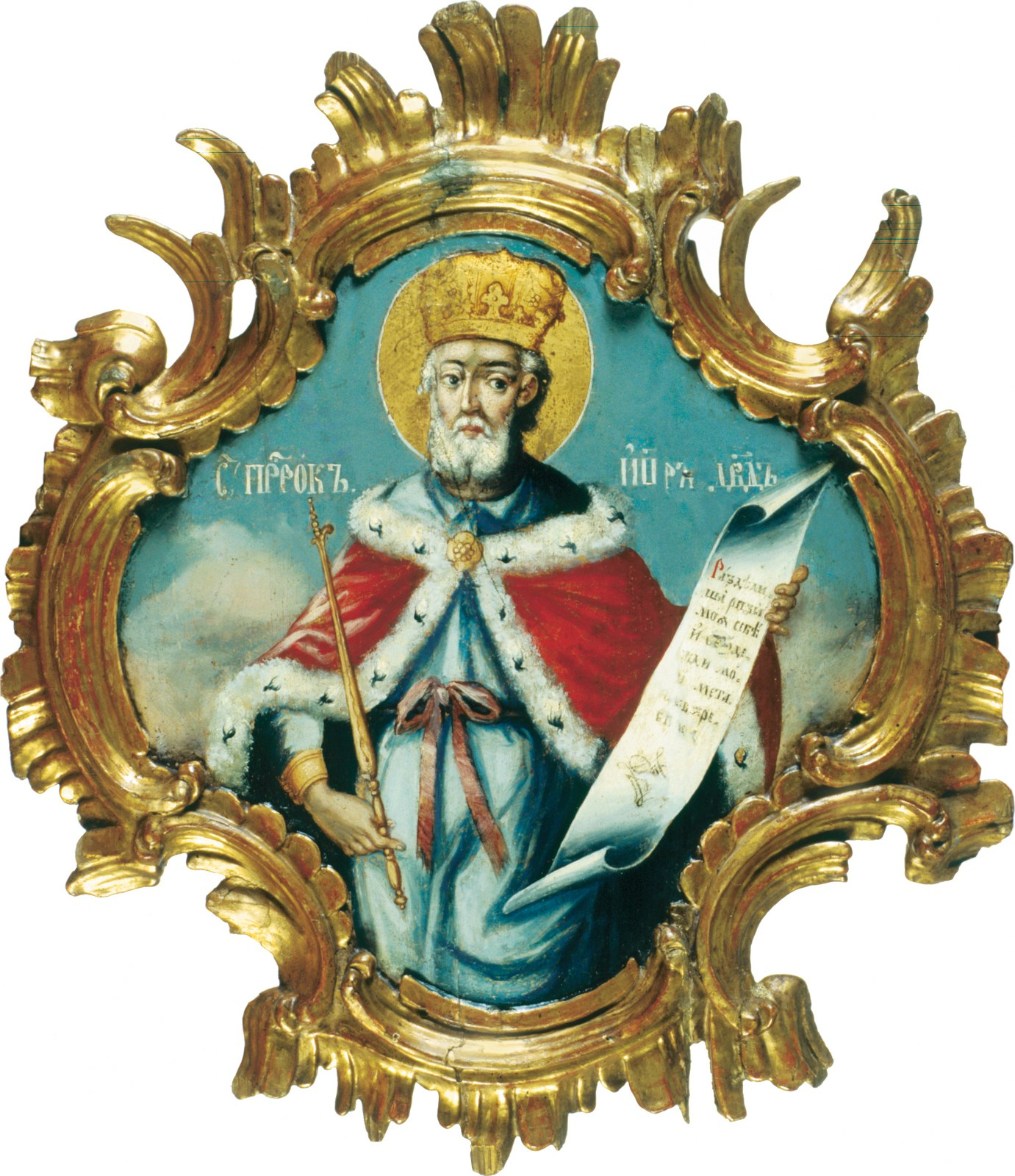
Prophet and Emperor David, (1785)

== See also ==
- List of painters from Serbia
- Teodor Ilić Češljar
- Teodor Kračun
- Jakov Orfelin
- Stefan Tenecki
- Stefan Gavrilović
- Mojsije Subotić
- Georgije Tenecki
- Serbian art
