= Beočin Monastery =

Monastery in Beočin, Serbia

Coordinates: 45°10′38″N 19°43′17″E

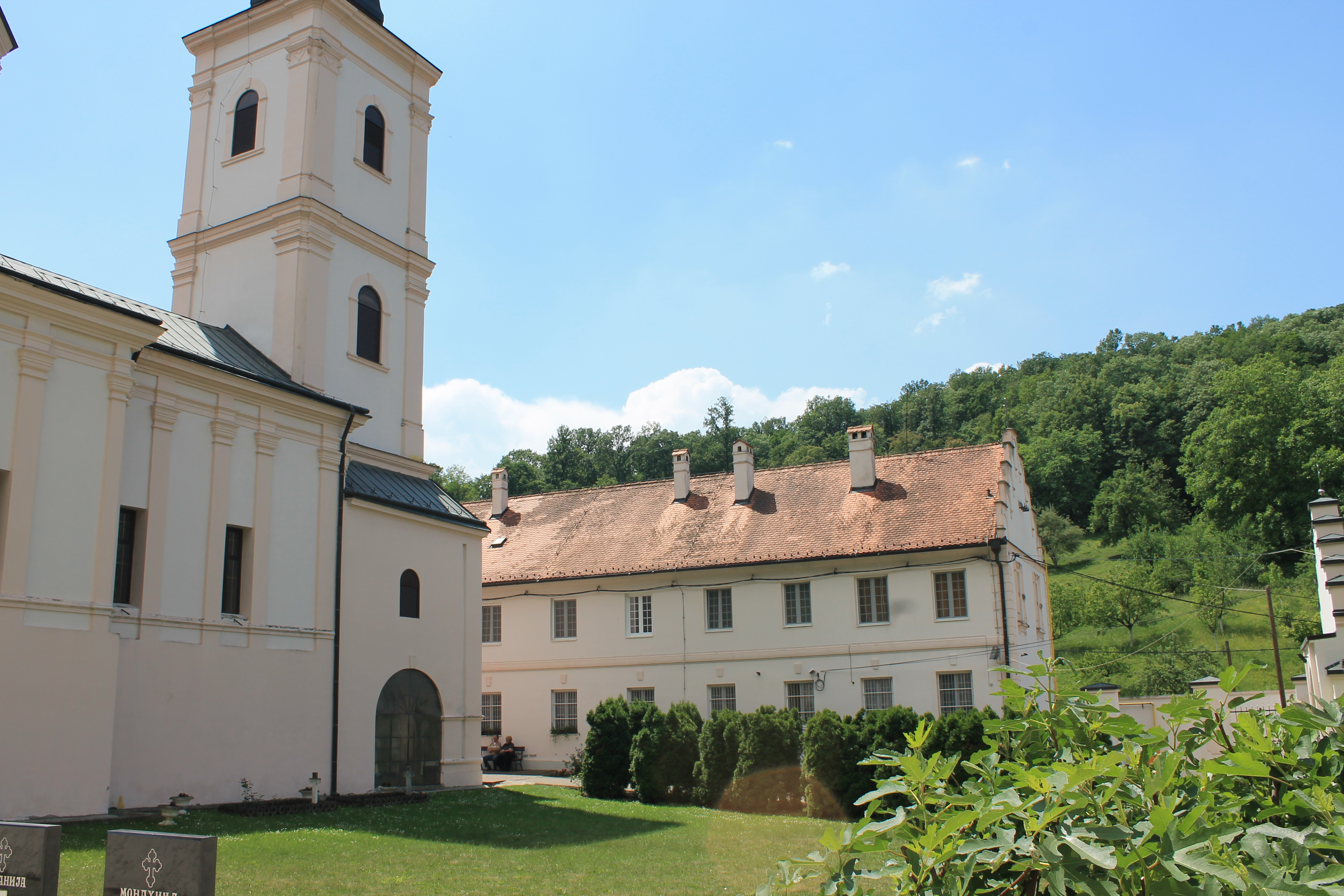
Beočin Monastery

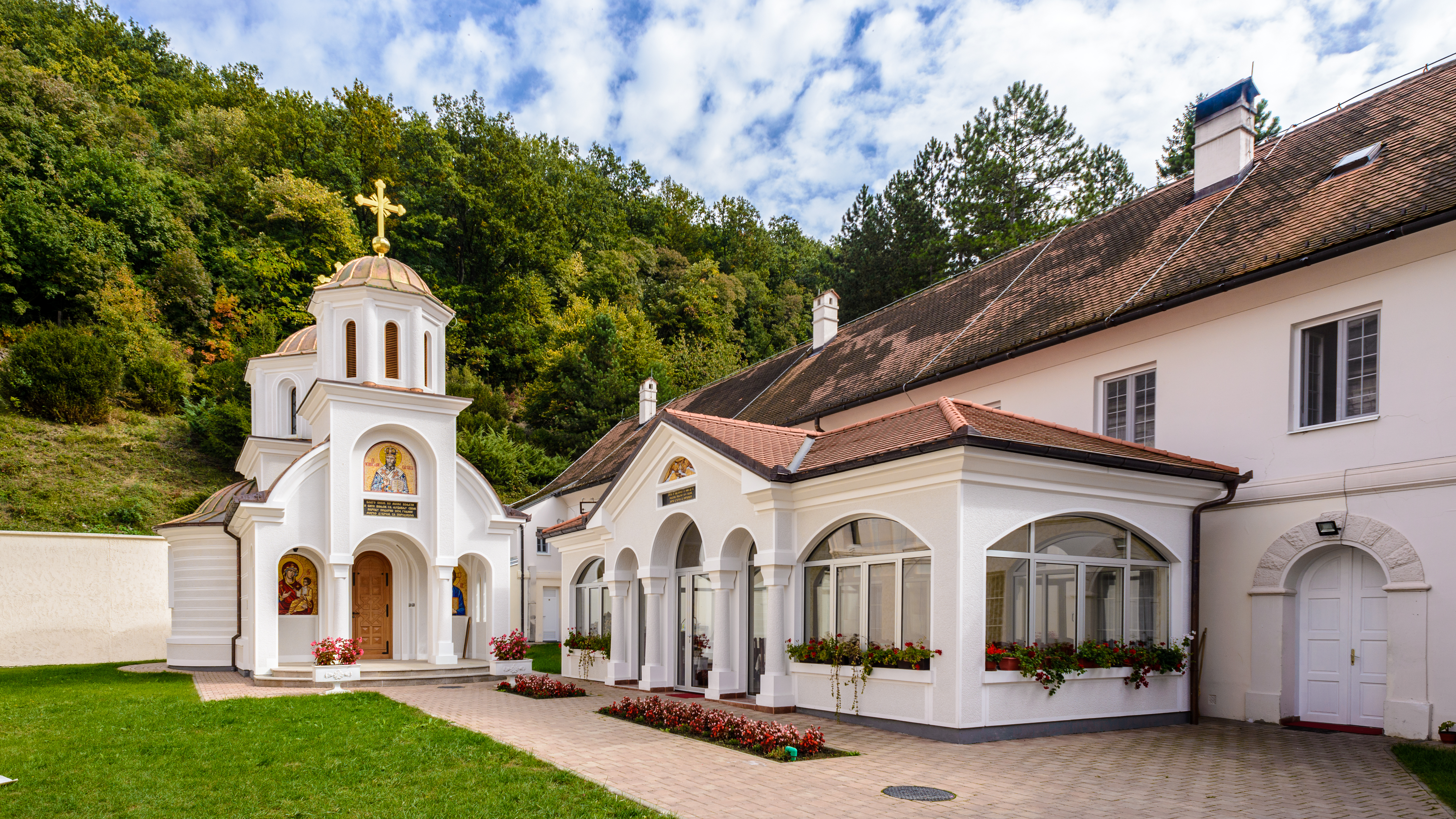
Beočin Monastery

The Beočin Monastery (Serbian: Mанастир Беочин, romanized: Manastir Beočin) is a Serbian Orthodox monastery, located just outside Beočin, on Fruška Gora mountain in the northern Serbian province of Vojvodina.

The date of its founding is unknown. It was first mentioned in Ottoman Turkish records dated in 1566/1567. The monastery suffered heavy damages and was abandoned during the Austro-Turkish Wars (1593–1791), but the monks of Rača (western Serbia) arrived and reconstructed the holy place. The construction works on the extant church lasted from 1732 until 1740, and the bell-tower was completed in 1762. A general reconstruction was undertaken in 1893. The icons were painted by Janko Halkozović, Dimitrije Bačević and Teodor Kračun.

Beočin Monastery was declared a Monument of Culture of Exceptional Importance in 1990 and it is protected by Republic of Serbia.

== See also ==
- List of Serbian Orthodox monasteries
