= Orfelin =

Orfelin is a surname. Notable people with the surname include:

- Jakov Orfelin (died 1803), Serbian painter
- Zaharije Orfelin (1726–1785), Serbian polymath
