= Pahomije Tenecki =

Serbian painter

Pahomije Tenecki (Serbian Cyrillic: Пахомије Тенецки) was a Serbian painter born in the 17th-century.

Pahomije Tenecki comes from an aristocratic pedigree from Lipova on his paternal side. His mother's people came from Poland. Pahomije Tenecki was of the Teneckis who had produced two excellent painters (Stefan Tenecki and Georgije Tenecki) in two generations. He was of the Teneckis who knew that Velazquez had twenty-seven shades of black. This family talent is evident in Pahomije's industriousness and the qualities of his paintings. He naturally became a painter to the Arad Bishops Isaija Antonović, Sinesija Živanović (1749-1768) and Pahomije Knežević (1769-1783). Moreover, he was a senator in the municipal council of Arad, in which status he portrayed himself in what would become the first self-portrait in Serbian painting. The Family home in Arad and his loyalty to that town did not lessen his mobility, and he was willing to work on a great number of commissions from Fruška Gora and Banat to Transylvania in the Carpathian Mountains.

Serbian author Milorad Pavić weaved Pahomije Tenecki in his best-selling novel entitled "The Inner Side of the Wind, Or The Novel of Hero and Leander" (1993).

== See also ==
- List of Serbian painters
