= Bezdin monastery =

Serbian Orthodox monastery in Romania

Coordinates: 46.1399°N 21.0271°E

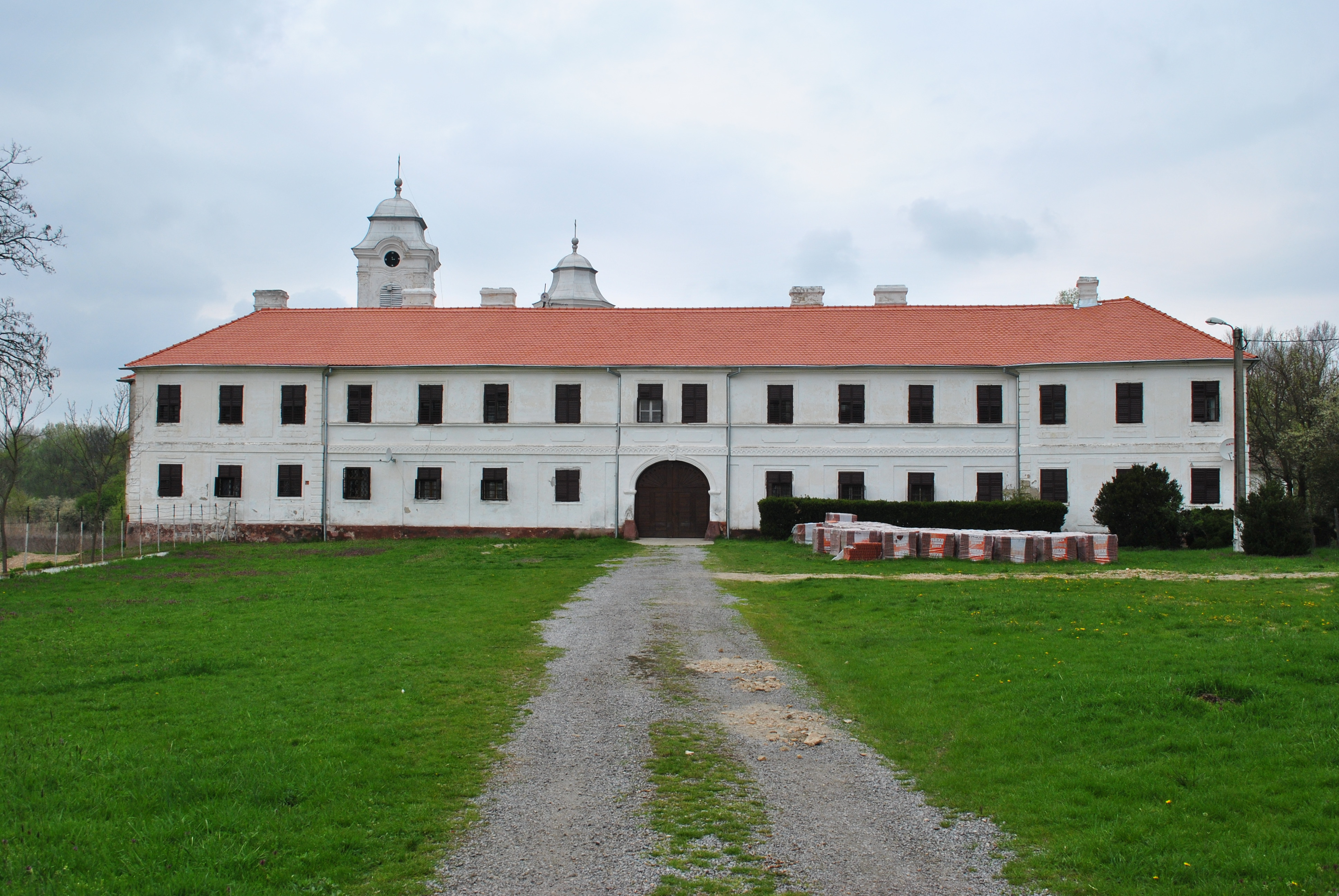

Bezdin Monastery (Romanian: Mănăstirea Bezdin; Serbian: Манастир Бездин) is a Serbian Orthodox monastery, located near the village of Secusigiu in Arad County, Romania, on the right bank of the Mureș River. The monastery was constructed in 1539 and is dedicated to the Assumption of the Theotokos, celebrated on August 28 according to the New Style.

== History ==
In the beginning, Bezdin Monastery was hidden in the dense and towering forest that surrounds it. Nowadays the forest has retreated towards the Mureș River, occupying only the space between the defensive dam behind the monastery and the bank of the river. Architecturally, it proved to be an excellent location.

The name of the monastery comes from the Bezdin stream which forms a series of swamps with a lot of reeds in its western part, creating at the same time a very picturesque landscape.

The construction of the Bezdin Monastery began in 1539 with the zeal of Iovan Iaksici (Jovan Jakšić) from Nadlac who later lived there. However, there is an older mention still concerning Bezdin Monastery in the inscription on Psalter by Božidar Vuković printed in Venice in 1520. It happened during the time of Archimandrite Ioasaf Milutinovici, and the construction was done with the help of Serbian Orthodox faithful and their co-religionists the Orthodox Vlahs. This information is recorded on a Psalter tab (now in Vršac) by Leontije Bogojević, a hieromonk.

The monastery was set on fire by the Turks during the Ottoman occupation of Banat, but was not abandoned by the monks, who built a wooden church in which they served until the construction of the current one. The brick church was built after 1690, in Byzantine style in the shape of a club with three apses.

The existence of the Bezdin monastery meant an important moment in the history of the Serbian community in this province of the Austro-Hungarian Empire, around the holy place keeping alive the faith and the cohesion of brotherhood of this ethnic group.

After 1740 there followed a period of development of the monastery, during the tenure of abbot Teodosie Veselinovici, who came here from the Vincia Monastery in Serbia together with the community, from where they were persecuted by the Turks.

Among the many valuable objects of worship, they also brought the miracle-working Icon of the Mother of God from Mount Athos.

In 1753, the well-known painter from Arad, Stefan Tenecki, painted the iconostasis of the church. In 1755 the carpentry was executed and the holy marble table was donated. In 1771 the mansion of the monastery already had important dimensions, having more than 52 rooms, chapel, hall, refectory. An inventory of the library was taken in 1783 and at that time, 16 monks lived there.

In 1802 the academic painter Jakov Orfelin painted a completely new iconostasis, and in 1833 important repair works were carried out. Between 1912 and 1922 the great Serbian painter Stevan Aleksić worked there, who executed great pictorial compositions found today at the Serbian Orthodox Vicariate in Timișoara for better preservation. Also at the Vicariate of Timișoara, there is part of the painting of the iconostasis (removable parts), as well as most of the rich monastery library. Furthermore, a school was established at Bezdin in 1921.

== See also ==
- List of Serbian Orthodox monasteries
- Eparchy of Timișoara
- Serbs of Romania

== Sources ==
- Krstić, Aleksandar; Magina, Adrian (2021). "The Belmužević Family: The Fate of a Noble Family in South-East Europe During the Turbulent Period of the Ottoman Conquest (the 15th and First Half of the 16th Centuries)". Revue des études sud-est européennes. 59: 105–123.
