= Teodor Ilić Češljar =

- The Martyrdom of St. Barbara
- Born: Teodor Ilić; January 1746 (or December 1745); Čurug
- Died: 1 December 1793 (20 November 1793 according to old calender); Bačko Petrovo Selo
- Notable work: The Martyrdom of St. Barbara Vision of Saint John the Evangelist
- Movement: Baroque, Rococo

Teodor Ilić Češljar (Serbian Cyrillic: Теодор Илић Чешљар; 1746−1793) was a Serbian late baroque painter. His works are regarded as eclectic, combining Baroque and Rococo and is considered to be the main Serb representative of such style. His most famous work is The Martyrdom of St. Barbara.

== Biography ==
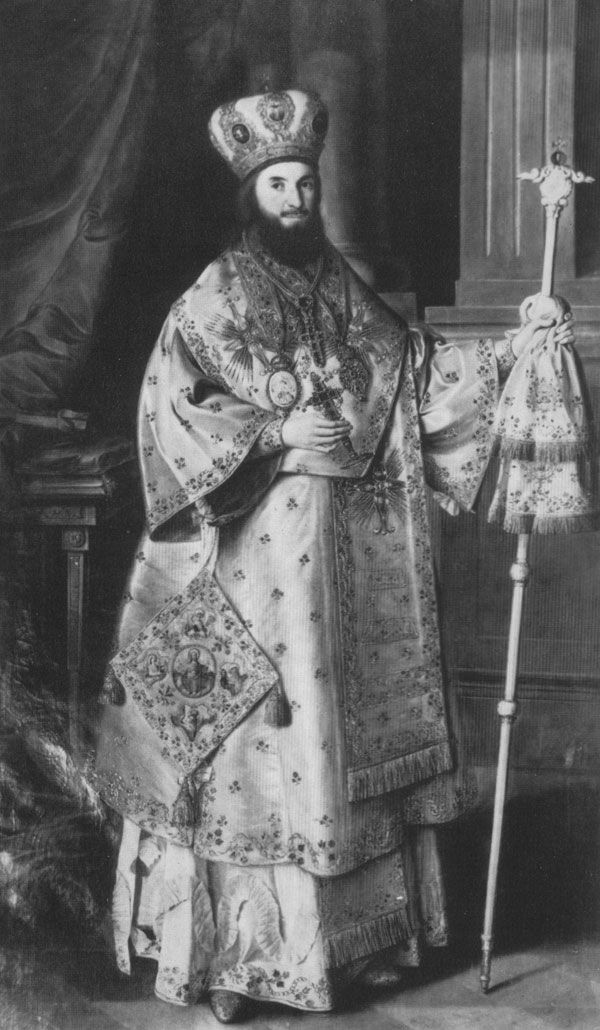
Bishop Josif Jovanovic (1787)

=== Early years ===
Češljar was born in 1746 in Čurug and died on November 20, 1793, at age 47 in Bačko Petrovo Selo (both now in Serbia). During his childhood, his family moved to Kumane before settling in Timisoara. One of the earliest works is a cloak gifted to Kumane monastery where he temporarily resided.It is assumed that he learned to paint from famous masters of Timișoara and Novi Sad, where he lived in 1769. His known work before moving to Vienna was a painting of four evangelists on church belfry in Buda in 1776 on which he worked together with colleague painter Mihailo Skokolović.

=== Move to Vienna ===
According to so some older biographers, Češljar enrolled in Academy of Fine Arts Vienna in 1786. During studies, he was exposed to growing influence of Italian Baroque paintings. In Vienna, he met Italian Rococo for the first time. He was just as well influenced by works of Antoine Watteau and El Greco.

=== Later life ===
He worked on his first iconostasis in 1789 in the church of Mokrin; after that, he worked in Velika Kikinda and Stara Kanjiža in 1791, and in Bačko Petrovo Selo from 1792 to 1793, when he died. Alongside this, he drew several icons for the lower church in Sremski Karlovci and iconostasis of Kovilj monastery which was destroyed in 1848.

According to quotes from Teodor Ilić Češljar biographies, he was a great colorist and exceptionally inventive in composure. He didn't always paint in the style of baroque. He, as his coeval, leaned to softer and more gentle colors, silky facture glaze painting just like French masters of Rococo. There is no accurate information about all of the portraits painted by Teodor Ilić Češljar, but it is certain that his works include portraits of bishop Pavle Avakumović (1789), portrait of an unknown priest (National Museum of Serbia), portrait of Josif Jovanović Šakabenta (1787, Museum of Vršac) and large number of ecclesiastical portraits. On these portraits, Češljar proved to be a master of drawing and also a subtle and aesthetic colorist as he did with icons.

His famous painting of Saint Barbara Anguish (1785) was drawn for Bishop of Nagyvárad. It shows his great sense of composition. This canvas is reminiscent of Venetian decorative painters. Two wall paintings in the St. Nicholas Church in Kikinda show even more intentions for Venetian painting. They are The Last Supper and Christ in Eclat.

A street in Kikinda is named after him.

== Martyrdom of St. Barbara ==
Saint Barbara is an early Christian martyr who was highly revered within the Karlovac Metropolitanate. A few years earlier, Češljar had just graduated from the art academy.

The basic baroque element is the stage drama that rests on the attitudes of the main protagonists. A classical element in the conception of Saint Barbara is the concentration on the unity of the plot. Baroque representations of martyrdom are often burdened with secondary narratives, but the main flow of the plot in the composition is not blurred. It is focused on the culminating moment of the drama when Barbara's father prepares to cut off the saint's head, giving her one more opportunity to bow to the idol, which the pagan priest holds in his hand.

The facade of an ancient building that closes the background of the painting is not an argument for a classicist interpretation of the painting. In the depictions of martyrdom, it appears almost regularly and has a multi-layered symbolic function. It, above all, located the action in a certain time period. These buildings are modeled on the architecture of the classicizing Baroque movement, and not on real ancient buildings. The antique portal, partially obscured by a cloud, a connecting element that in Baroque connects heaven and earth, has in Češljar's painting the symbolic meaning of the vestibule of heaven, the heavenly home of God, and in this way replaces the reduced upper part of the earlier Veliko Varadé variant and its template.

In the entire conception of the space of the Torture of St. Barbara, created for the Pakrac bishopric, Češljar is close to classicist practice, which, unlike Baroque allegories, presents the antique conception of death and immortality. Baroque Christian martyrs die for heavenly glory, while classicist heroes die for earthly glory. Viewed as a whole, the stylistic characteristics of Češljar's composition nevertheless show a harmonious consistency, so the appearance of certain Baroque elements, primarily the interpretation of light, is not a reflection of Baroque disorders, but rather an adherence to the painting practice of the Vienna Academy of Fine Arts, where, at the time of Češljar's education, precisely such art was nurtured - the organic syncretism of classicist art strongly imbued with Baroque tradition.

In Češljar's painting opus, the Pakrac composition The Torture of St. Barbara took on a significant place. During the 18th century, it became certainly Češljar's most famous work. Arsenije Teodorović copied it during his stay in Pakrac, while another copy of Češljar's St. Barbara was made by Pavel Đurković for the residence of the Bishop of Bačka in Novi Sad.

== Works ==
Martyrdom of St. Barbara, 1785, Narodni muzej Srbije

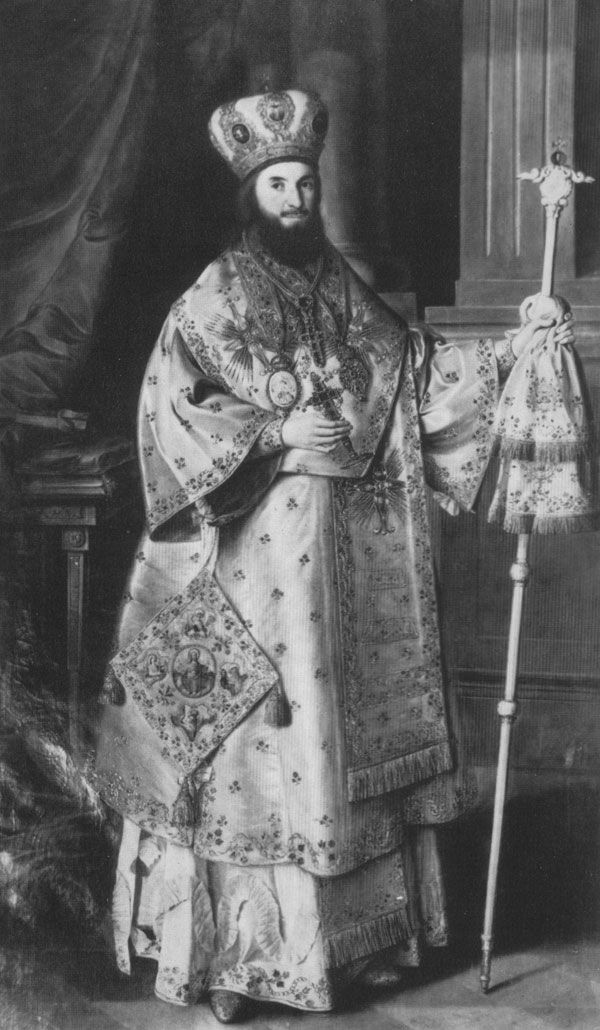
Josif Jovanović, Bishop of Vršac, 1787, Vršac City Museum

Alojzija Alka Putnik, 1783, Matica srpska gallery

Vision of Saint John the Evangelist, 1790,Matica srpska gallery

Mary with Jesus, 1767-70, Matica srpska gallery

Jesus Christ, 1767-70, Matica srpska gallery

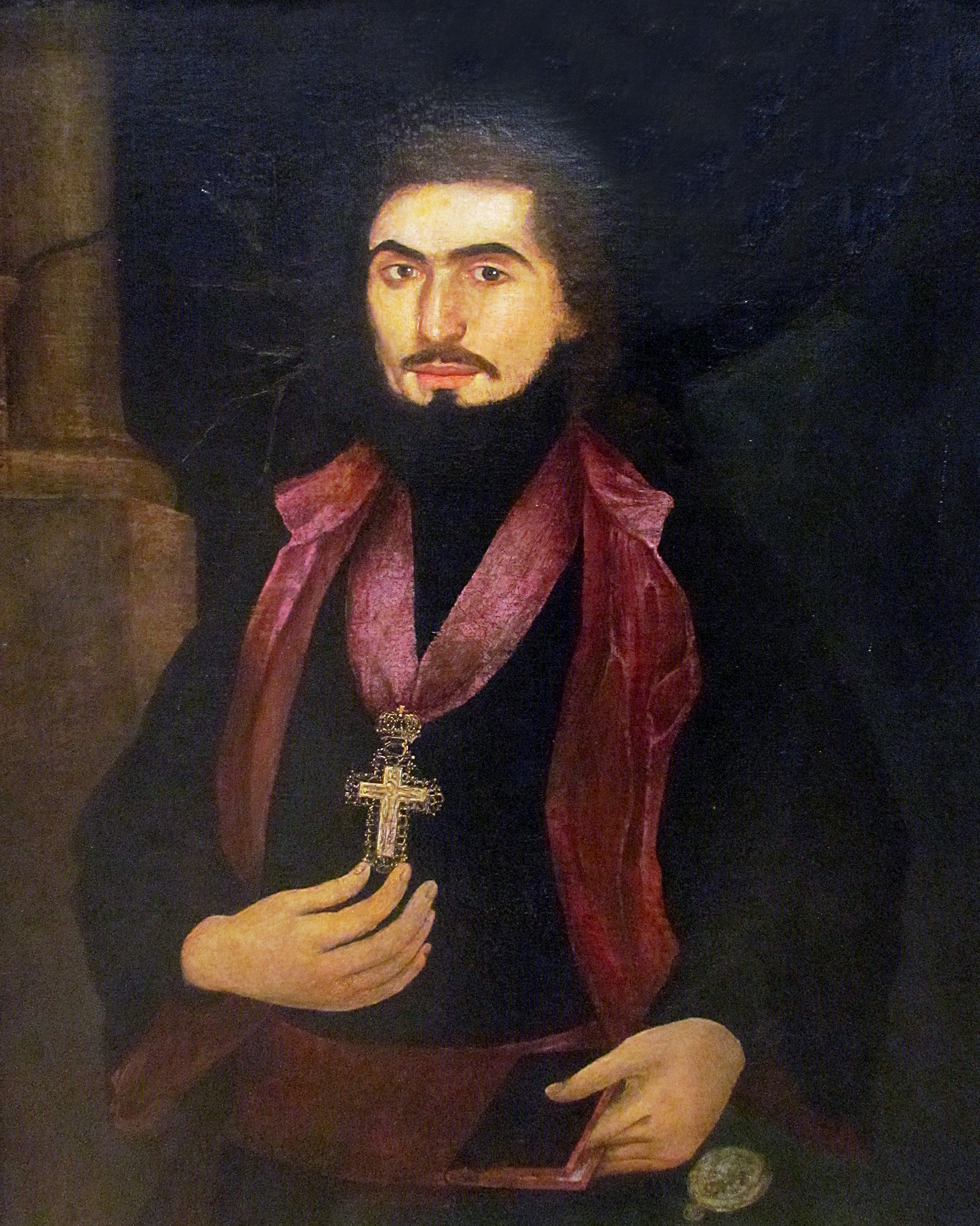
Bishop Stefan Avakumović, c. 1790, National Museum of Serbia

Sara Avakumović (~1790)

== See also ==
- List of Serbian painters
- Jakov Orfelin
- Stefan Tenecki
- Teodor Kračun
- Stefan Gavrilovic
- Jovan Isailović
- Mojsije Subotić
- Georgije Tenecki
- Joakim Marković
