= Stefan Gavrilović =

Serbian painter

Stefan Gavrilović (Serbian Cyrillic: Стефан Гавриловић, Sremski Karlovci, c. 1750-Sremski Karlovci, 1823) was an 18th-century-19th-century Serbian painter known best for his iconostasis and frescoes. He was a student of Jakov Orfelin

He is considered one of the masters of Neoclassical and late Baroque paintings, and was very influenced by Jakov Orfelin and Teodor Kračun. Georgije Bakalović was one of his pupils.

Gavrilović, whose work anticipated the arrival of the new artistic tendency—the Neoclassicism—had his studio workshop in Sremski Karlovci. He made many flags for the First Serbian Uprising against the Ottoman Empire. He authored Mojsije Putnik's portrait, among many other paintings, icons and frescoes.

== Selected works ==
Meropolitan Mojsije Putnik, (1790)

Poleksija pl. Čokić, 1780-90

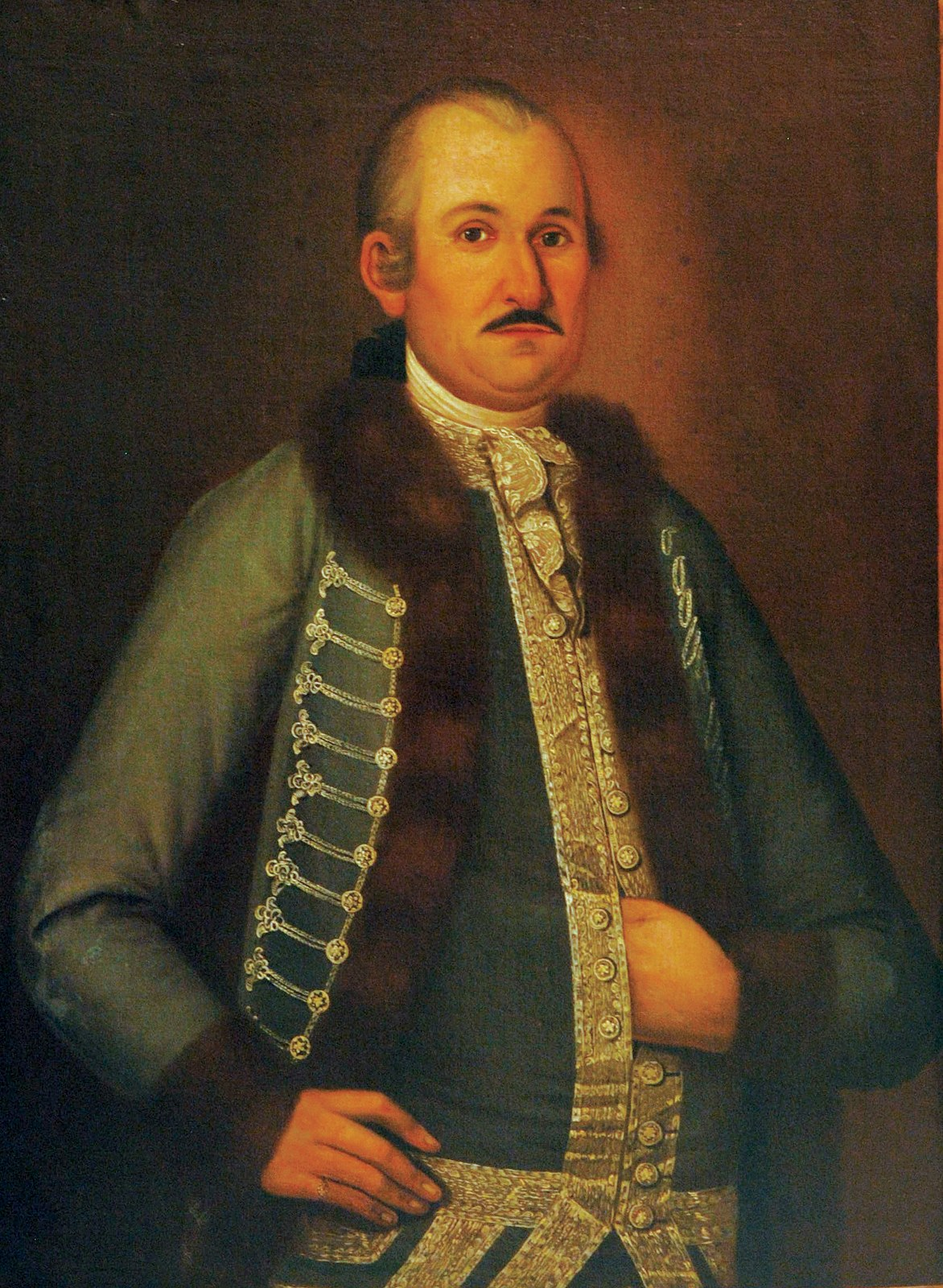
Portrait of Jakov Čokić, spahija from Bečej, (1780)

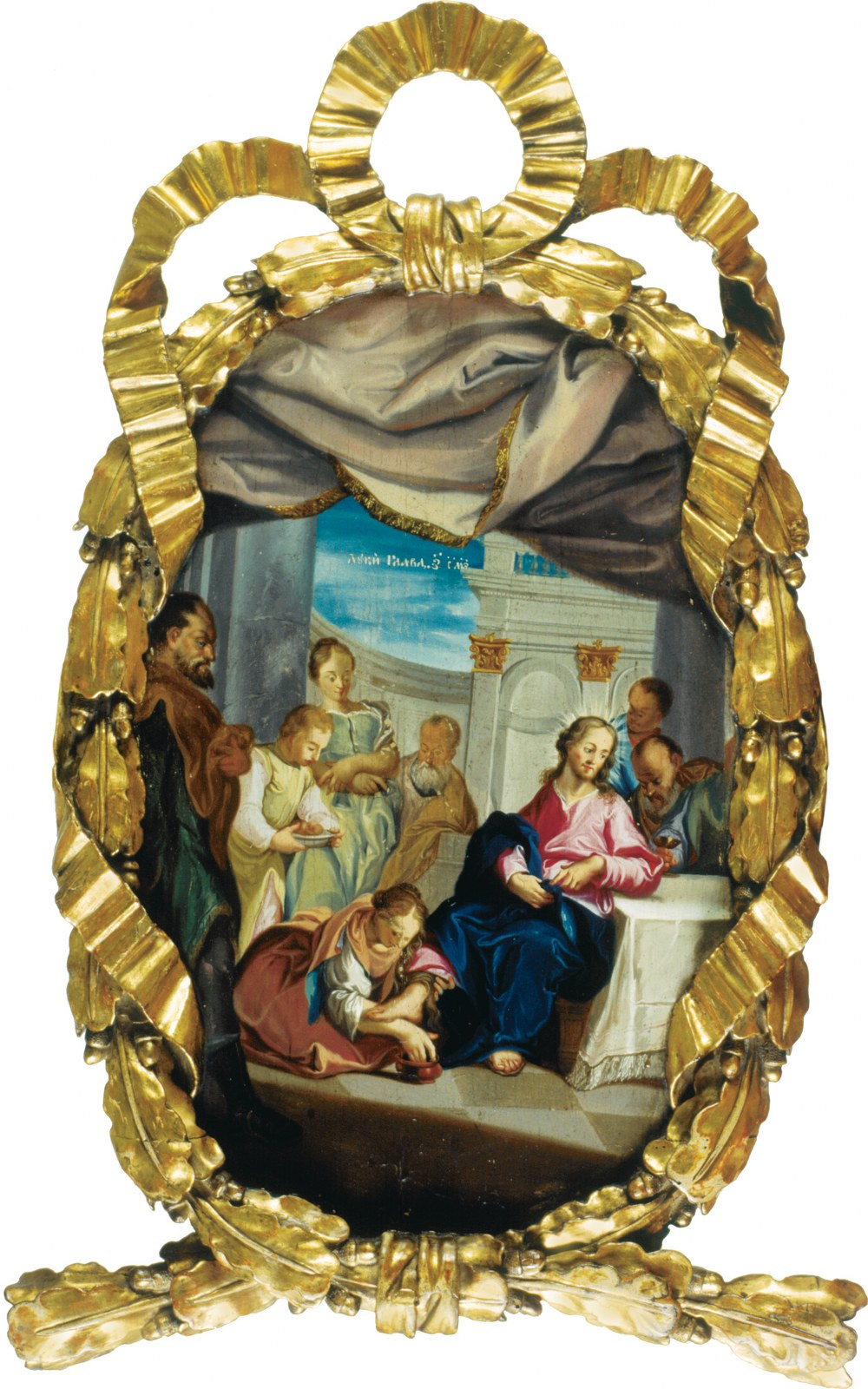
Christ and a Sinner, (1795)

=== Flags ===
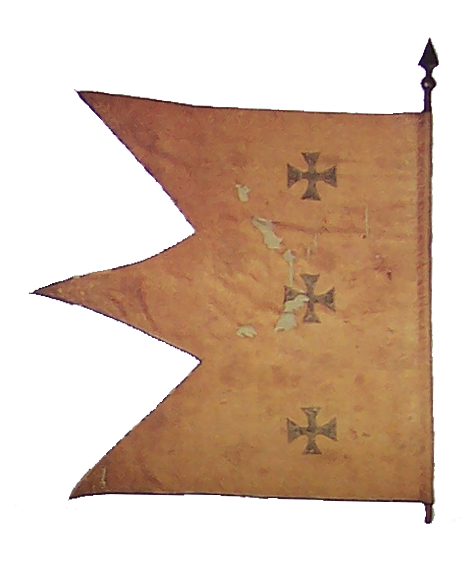
Flag, early 1804

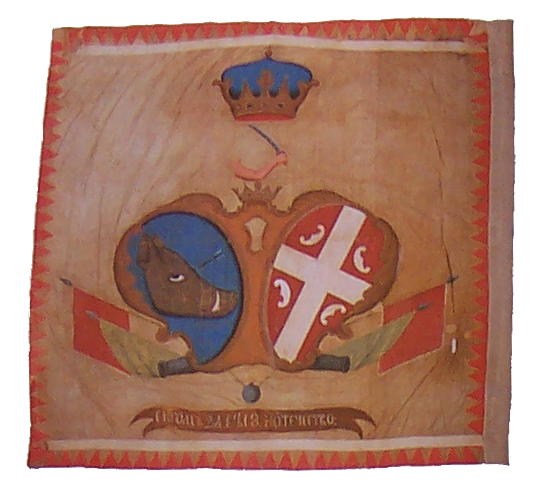
Flag, early 1809

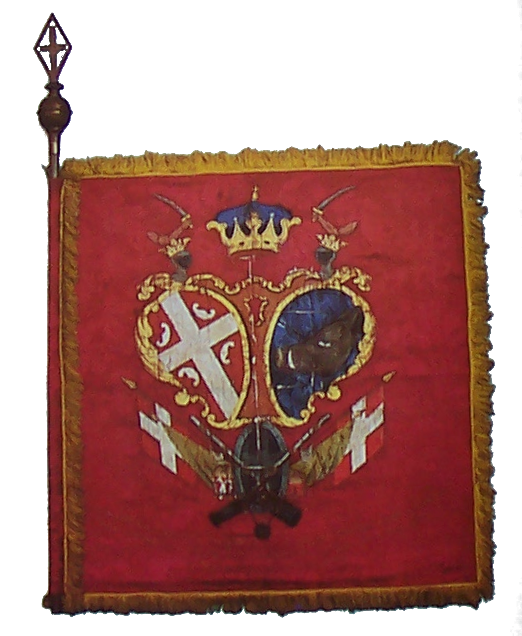
First Serbian Uprising voivode flag, 1811

== See also ==
- Teodor Ilić Češljar
- Teodor Kračun
- Jakov Orfelin
- Stefan Tenecki
- Jovan Isailović
- Mojsije Subotić
- Georgije Tenecki
