= Jakov Orfelin =

Serbian painter (d. 1803)

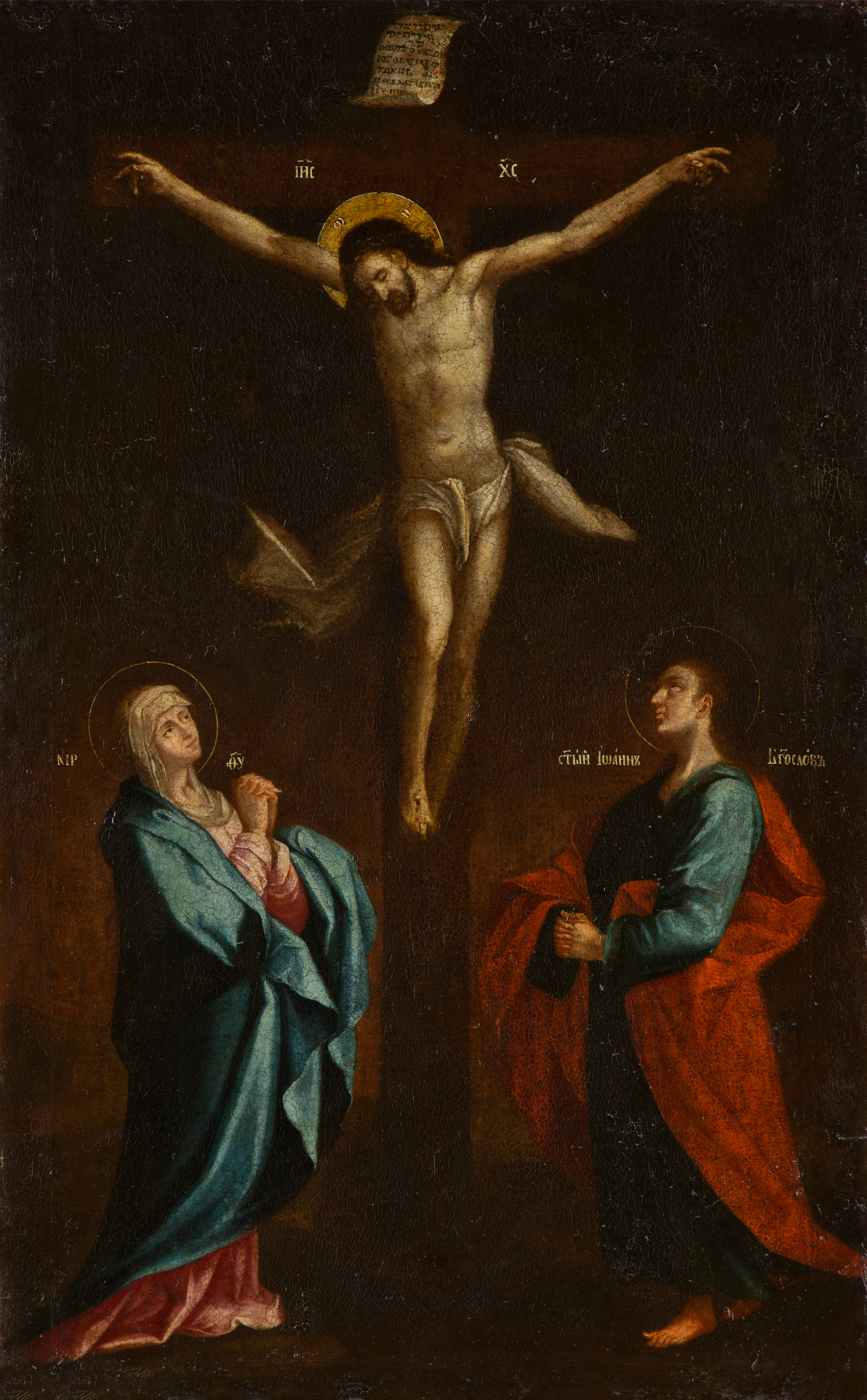
- Crucifixion - Jakov Orfelin (1780)
- Born: Jakov Orfelin; First half of 18th century Vukovar
- Died: 20 October 1803; Arad
- Notable work: Crucifixtion, portaits of Arsenije Jovanovic and Stefan Stratimirovic
- Movement: Baroque, Rococo

Jakov Orfelin (Serbian Cyrillic: Јаков Орфелин; c. mid-18th century – 20 October 1803) was a Serbian Baroque painter. He made iconostases for the churches of Bačka and Syrmia regions and also some portraits.

== Biography ==
Jakov Orfelin was born in Vukovar or in Sremski Karlovci, at the time part of the Habsburg monarchy, and received his first artistic education from his uncle Zaharije Orfelin, with whom he collaborated on church commissions later. In 1766, he pursued his art studies in Vienna at the Art Academy and took courses at the newly-founded engraving academy directed by Jacob Matthias Schmutzer (1733-1811).

One of his earliest works was the iconostasis in Grgeteg Monastery (1774), which was replaced in 1902 with the iconostasis done by Uroš Predić. In 1780-1781, he collaborated with Teodor Kračun in the iconostasis painting of the St. Nicholas Cathedral of Sremski Karlovci, considered by the Serbian Academy of Sciences and Arts to be "a summit of Baroque painting in Vojvodina".

He died in Arad.

== Works ==
=== Paintings ===
Pyramid (1768), first recorded work of Jakov Orfelin

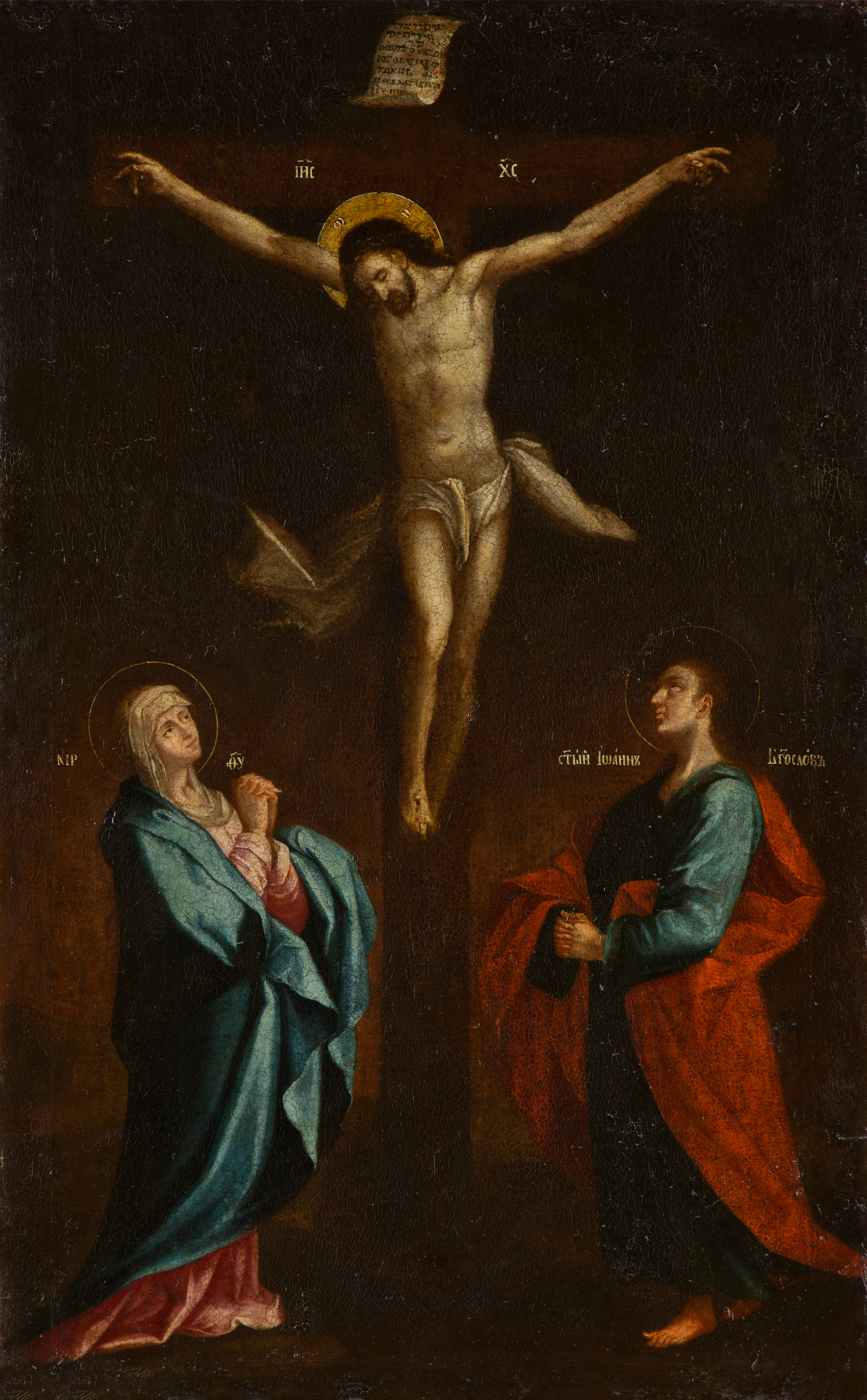
Crucifixion (1780)

Holy Trinity (1780-81)

Jesus Christ (1780-81)

Marta Tekelija (1790)

Metropolitan Stefan Stratimirovic portrait

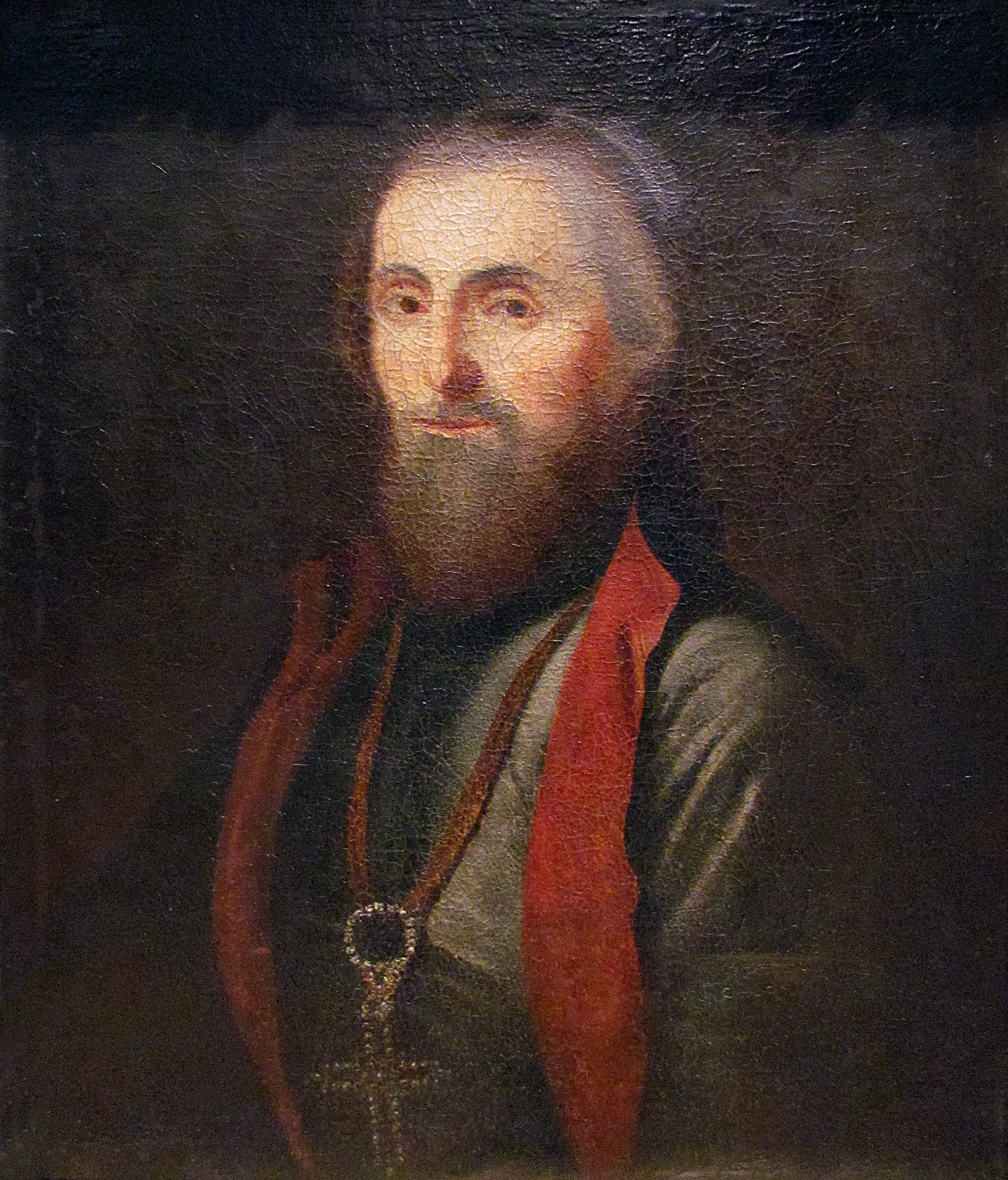
Arsenije IV Jovanović Šakabenta (~1785), National Museum of Serbia

Saint Nicholas (1773), Kikinda

=== Iconostases ===
The iconostasis of the St. Nicholas Cathedral of Sremski Karlovci is his most famous work.

- 1773: the iconostasis of the Church of St. Nicholas of Kikinda, sometimes attributed to Teodor Ilić Češljar;
- 1774: the first iconostasis of the church of the monastery of Grgeteg;
- 1776: the iconostasis of the Church of St. Sava in Maradik;
- 1778: the iconostasis of the Church of the Transfiguration of Obrež;
- 1780: the iconostasis of the church of St. Luke Kupinovo, attributed to Jakov Orfelin;
- 1780-1781: the iconostasis of the St. Nicholas Cathedral of Sremski Karlovci, in collaboration with Teodor Kračun;
- 1788: the iconostasis of the church of St. Theodore-Tiron of Irig;
- 1790: the iconostasis of the Church of the Presentation-of-the-Mother-of-God-in-Temple of Stapar;
- 1792: the iconostasis of the Church of St. George Ratkovo;
- 1793: the iconostasis of the church Saint-Gabriel (Saint-Michel) of Veliki Radinci;
- 1794: the iconostasis of the Church of St. Nicholas of Kraljevci;
- 1797: the iconostasis of the Church of St. George of Jarak, in collaboration with Stefan Gavrilović
- 1802: The iconostasis of the church of Bezdin Monastery near Arad.

=== Portraits ===
- Portrait of Jovan Haranitović, priest in Kraljevci
- Portrait of Marta Tekelija (the wife of Jovan Tekelija), before 1791, Gallery of the Matica srpska

Other

- Jakov Orfelin's representation of Tsar Dušan the Mighty to illustrate Jovan Rajić's "Istorija raznih slovenskih narodov, najpače Bolgar, Horvatov i Serbov" (History of various Slav peoples, especially Bulgarians, Croats and Serbs), published for the first time in 1768 and in an edition in four volumes in 1794-1795, also served as a direct source of inspiration for those who came after him, for example, Đura Jakšić's painting of the same ruler in 1857.

== See also ==
- List of painters from Serbia
- Teodor Ilić Češljar
- Teodor Kračun
- Stefan Gavrilović
- Stefan Tenecki
- Jovan Isailović
- Mojsije Subotić
- Georgije Tenecki
