= Teodor Kračun =

Serbian icon and altar painter

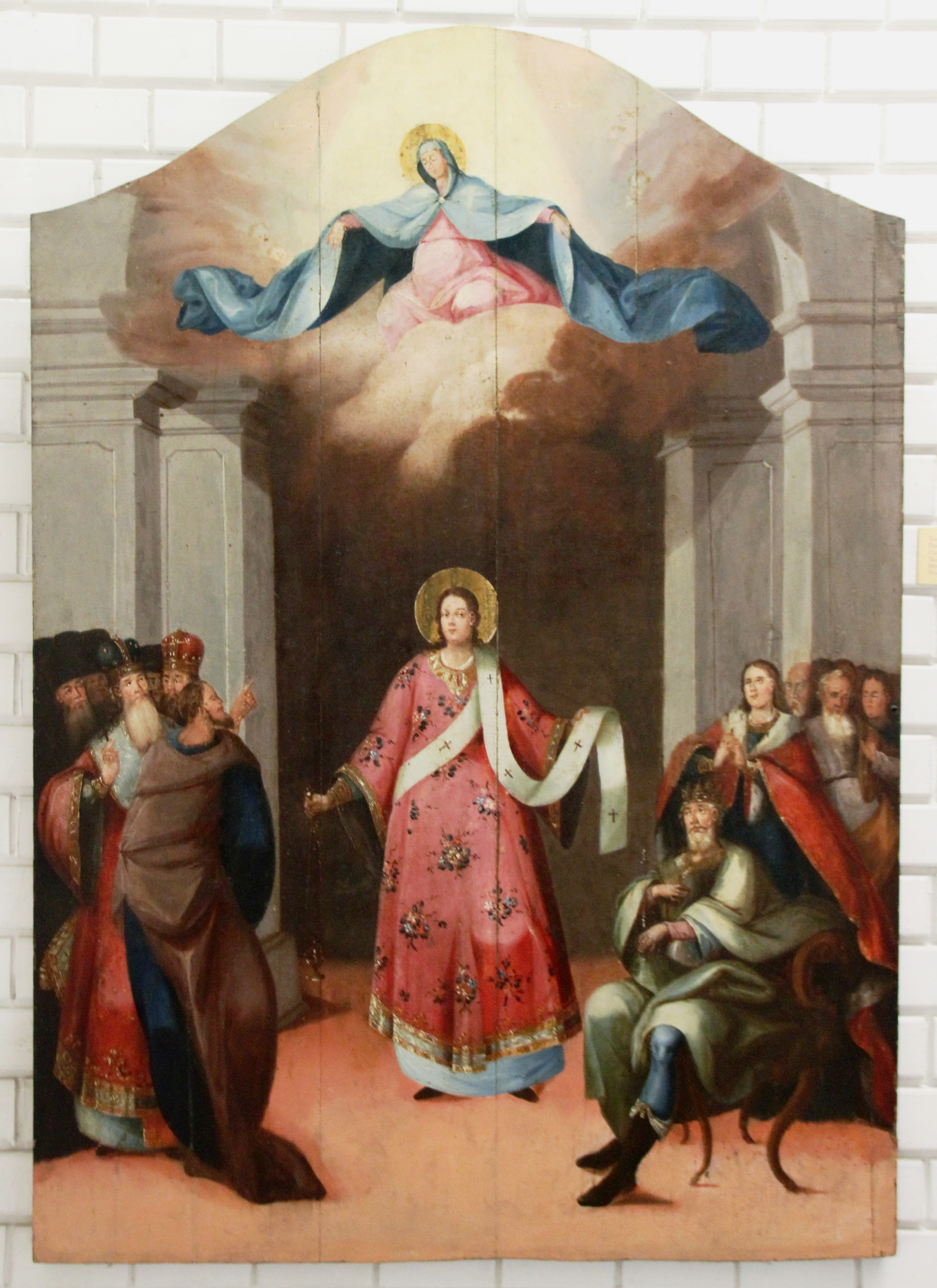
- The Intercession of the Virgin Mary
- Born: Teodor Dimitrijević; 1730; Sremska Kamenica
- Died: 10 April 1781 (aged 50–51); Sremski Karlovci
- Notable work: Pavle Nenadović portrait, Ascension of Christ
- Movement: Baroque

Teodor Dimitrijević (Serbian Cyrillic: Теодор Димитријевић; 1730 – 10 April 1781), known as Teodor Kračun (Теодор Крачун) was a Serbian icon and altar painter.

== Biography ==
He was born at Sremska Kamenica in 1730. His original surname was Dimitrijević, but later the nickname "Kračun" stuck. He studied art under Dimitrije Bačević, a well-known icon- and portrait painter, before taking monastic vows and entering the Vienna Academy in 1769. During his lifetime he produced numerous icons and altarpieces that are still extant today in Serbian Orthodox and Roman Catholic churches and cathedrals throughout the province of Vojvodina. He was an acknowledged master of the Baroque period, considered the first great modern Serbian painter, and the most renowned of the Baroque and Rococo painting style in northern Serbia. His contemporaries were Stefan Tenecki, Dimitrije Popović, another student of Bačević, Jakov Orfelin, Georgije Mišković and Grigorije Davidović-Obšić.

His greatest and most important works, done between 1771 and 1781, are the two iconostases in the Cathedral Church of St. Nicholas in Sremski Karlovci. The smaller one in the chapel of St. George in the choir area (now in the Gallery of Matica Srpska, Novi Sad) and the other, larger one, in the church which was the most representative structure of the Serbian baroque built between 1752 and 1762, by Metropolitan Pavle Nenadović. For the Cathedral Church, Kračun did ten icons mounted on wood and for the upper church in Karlovci a series of icons. Several iconostasis icons in the Church of the Holy Archdeacon Stefan in Sremska Mitrovica, are also attributed to him. Some of the historians point out the resemblance of Kračun's painting to the art of the great El Greco, which is characterized by the light-dark effects, vibrating movements and the interplay of draperies and the background. In Kračun's work, the elements or rocaille art are also present. He also painted portraits. His best work is the portrait of Archimandrite Jovan Jovanović of Novo Hopovo Monastery. According to the records of St. Nicholas Church in Sremski Karlovci, Kračun died on 10 April 1781.

== Selected Works ==
Saint George (1773)

Jovan Jovanović as Archimandrite of Hopovo, (1776)

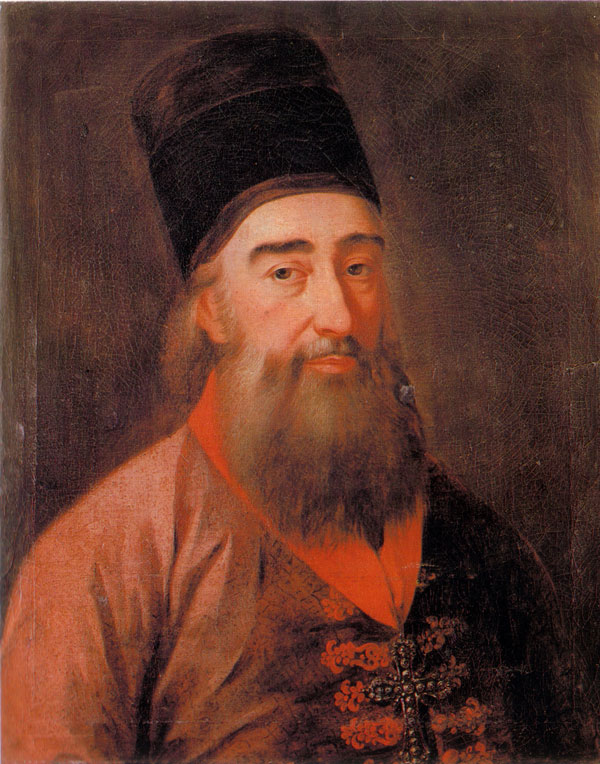
Metropolitan Pavle Nenadović, (~1768)

Jesus Christ, (1772)

Mary with Jesus, (1772)

Ascension of Christ, (1780)

Saint John the Evangelist (1780)

Baptism of Jesus

== See also ==
- Teodor Ilić Češljar
- Stefan Gavrilović
- Jakov Orfelin
- Stefan Tenecki
- Jovan Isailović
- Mojsije Subotić
- Georgije Tenecki
- Jovan Popović (Baroque painter)

== Sources ==
- Matica Srpska (1972). Teodor Kračun. Galerija Matice srpske.
