= Dimitrije Bačević =

Serbian painter (1735–1770)

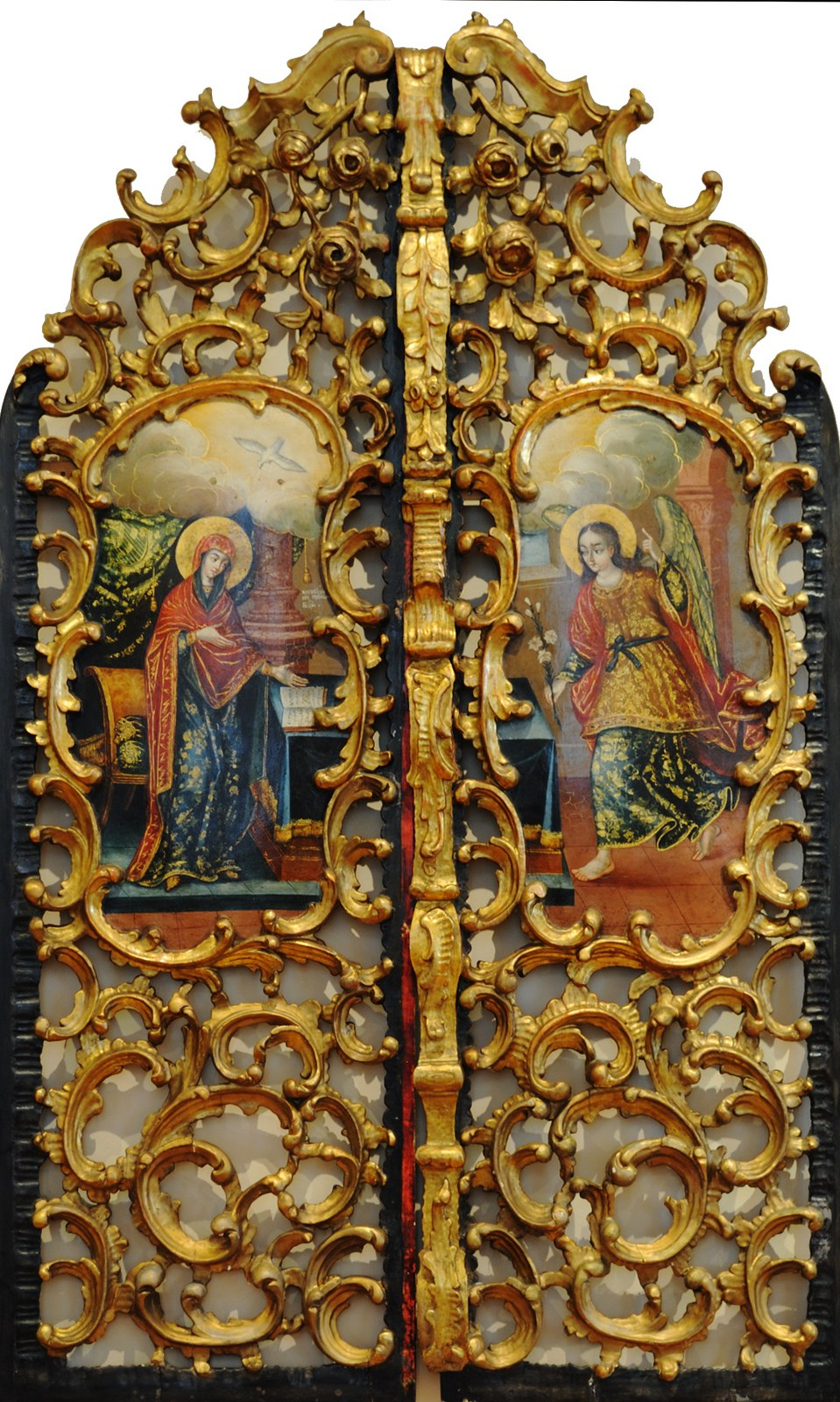
The Annunciation on the Imperial Gates, c. 1767-69

Dimitrije Bačević (1735–1770) was a Serbian icon painter and muralist in the Baroque style.

== Biography ==
Bačević studied painting at the workshop of Vasilije Romanovich and Jov Vasilijevich who came to Sremski Karlovci from Kyiv, Imperial Russia, in 1741. It was in Vasilievich's atelier that the first Serbian Baroque artists were trained, including Janko Halkozović, Vasa Ostojić, Teodor Kračun, Grigorije Davidović-Obšić, Aksentije Ostojić and Nikolaj Petrović and later at Bačević's own workshop in Sremski Karlovci. He is considered the most important representative of the Ukrainian baroque for the painted icons for the Nikolajevska crkva (Church of St. Nicholas) in Zemun in 1762. He also painted the iconostasis in Krušedol village church (1767–1769), in the upper church in Sremski Karlovci and the large iconostasis in Jaska Monastery, significant for its numerous figures of Serbian rulers and saints. The icons in the upper tiers of the iconostasis in Beočin Monastery, and the iconostasis in the village of Servas by Osijek are attributed to him as well. Among his icons the most significant are: the icon of St. John the Baptist (depicted with wings) in Kovilj Monastery, and the head of Christ kept in the National Museum in Belgrade. His icons have the dark gamma and dark green shades of the saints.

The style of painter Dimitrije Popović who did the iconostasis in Ciacova (1771), Orlovat, Itebej, and Srpski Pardanj was very close to Bačević's.
