= Janko Halkozović =

Serbian painter

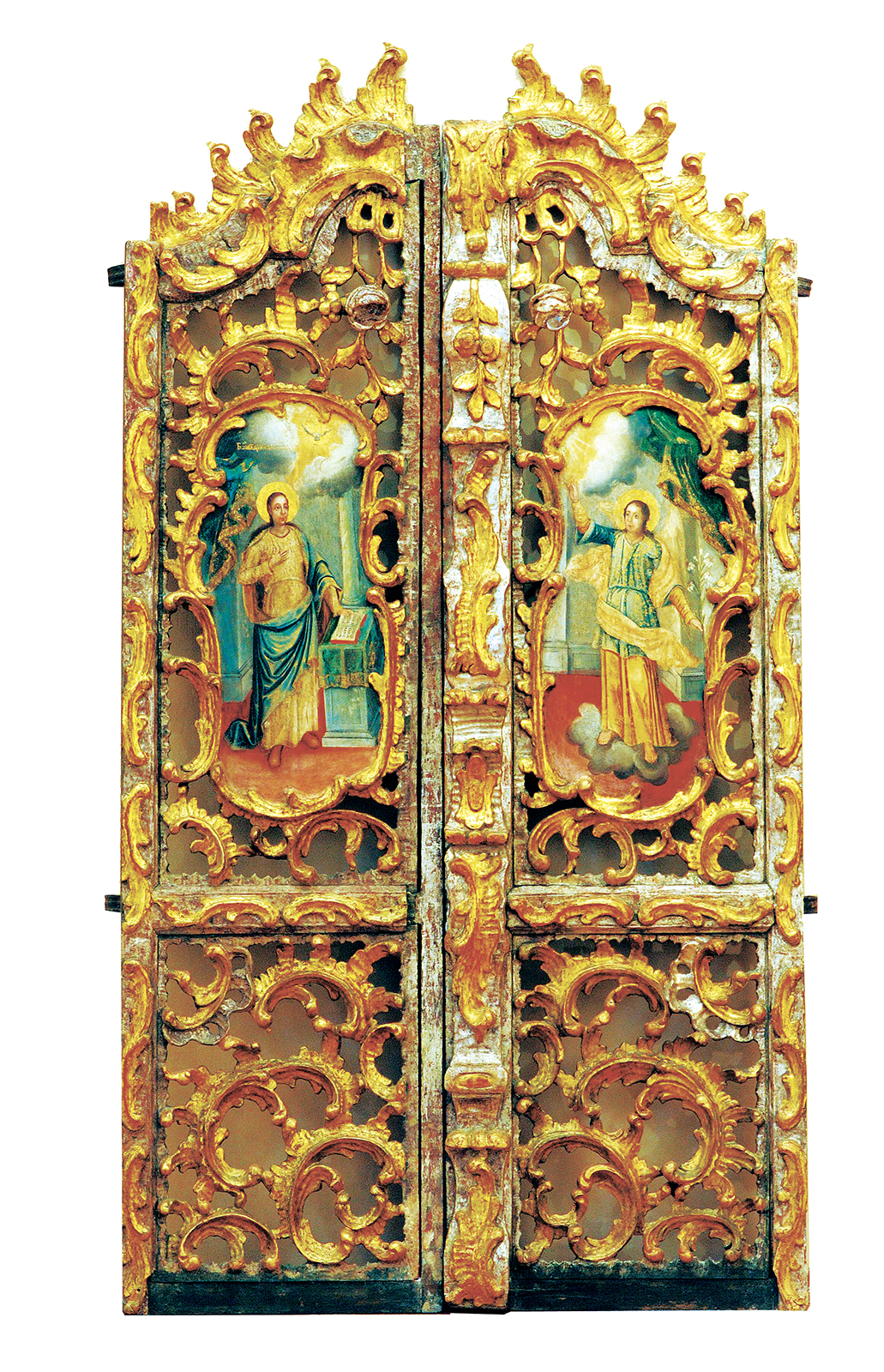
Annunciation by Janko Halkozović and Marko Gavrilović, 1772

Janko Halkozović was a Serbian painter from Old Serbia, modern-day North Macedonia.

His art, like Hristofor Žefarović's, developed in the tradition of Serbian southern regions. He became a renowned artist when he moved to Vojvodina in the northern part of Serbian regions. In 1757 he painted the iconostasis for Mala Remeta Monastery, and the next year he did parts of the iconostasis in Beočin Monastery, where he painted several murals in 1777. Halkozović also painted the iconostasis in Osijek and the main icons on the iconostasis of the Church of Holy Mother's Ascension in Novi Sad, among which the dominating one is the central component of the Coronation of the Mother of God that has been attributed to him. He also collaborated with other painters, including Jovan Isailović Senior. Halkozović lived and worked at about the same time as painters Stanoje Popović, Vasa Ostojić, Aleksije Lazović, Arsenije Teodorović, Joakim Marković, Jovan Četirević Grabovan, Teodor Ilić Češljar, Pavel Ćurković, Jovan Isailović, Pavle Simić Ilija Lončarević, and others. Unfortunately, a great deal of their iconostases and individual paintings were destroyed or disappeared during the invasion of the Kingdom of Yugoslavia and the Genocide of Serbs in the Independent State of Croatia during World War II. The remaining icons and individual paintings that were recovered are now in museums throughout Serbia.

Although there are elements of the old manner of painting in Halković's work, the dominating influences are highlighted by the trends of the baroque era.

== See also ==
- List of painters from Serbia
