= Grigorije Davidović-Obšić =

Serbian painter

Grigorije Davidović-Obšić or Grigorije Davidović Opšić, was a Serbian painter of the late 18th century. Most of his works can be seen on the iconostases of the monasteries of Fruška Gora in Serbia.

== Biography ==
Grigorije Davidović Obšić was born in the Srem village of Čalma in the mid-18th century. Obšić was a rich man of the time and at the same time a painter in the then-popular Baroque style. Grigorije name appears in 1807 as the sole subscriber of a philosophical book in his hometown of Čalma.

He worked under the influence of Teodor Kračun and Georgije Mišković, and his works are mostly found in village and town churches in both Srem and Slavonia. He was the first assistant to Dimitrije Bačević and Teodor Kračun. He was a prolific painter in the second half of the 18th century. He also signed his works as "Grigorije Čalmanski". A great number of his art pieces were destroyed or disappeared during the invasion of the Kingdom of Yugoslavia.

At the Orthodox Church in Irig, he painted the Virgin's throne in 1774. His most famous work is the large iconostasis of the monastery Šišatovac in the Fruška Gora region that dates from 1794, though destroyed in World War II. His next artistic achievement was for the church in Divoš on 7 October 1795. There he painted the walls: "Christ Coming to Earth" " and three icons on the chancel of the same Orthodox Church. Davidović is the author of the 1804 iconostasis in the church in Gornji Tovarnik and the iconostasis of the 1786 Serbian Orthodox Church in Laćarak (known as Srpska pravoslavna crkva Svetog arhanđela Mihajla u Laćarku).

His work can also be found in the churches of Opatovac, Jazka, his native Čalma, Manđelos, Veliki Radinci, Platičevo, and Ležimir.

== See also ==
- List of painters from Serbia
- Serbian art
