= Juan Carlo Calma =

Filipino visual artist and architect

- Born: Juan Carlo Calma; May 22, 1981 (age 44); Makati, Manila, Philippines
- Education: California College of the Arts, San Francisco and Architectural Association School of Architecture, London
- Known for: Conceptual art, architecture and interior design

Juan Carlo Calma (born 22 May 1981) is a Filipino visual artist and architect based in Makati, Manila, Philippines. His work involves art and architecture, with his practice, Carlo Calma Consultancy, Inc., extending from private residences to public installations.

With a degree from artisans and architects, he finished multidisciplinary courses in sculpture, painting, and light design at the California College of the Arts in San Francisco (2000–2003). He later completed his studies at the Architectural Association School of Architecture in London (2009).

Calma also serves as an architectural design consultant at Multi Development and Construction Corporation, where he has contributed to several architectural and interior design projects. As a visual artist, Calma's work has been shown in San Francisco, London, and Manila, and he has participated in numerous solo and group exhibitions. Calma also owns and curates the Manifesto Gallery in Manila and operates a fine-dining restaurant, Gallery Vask.

== Selected works ==
- 2008 The Aranaz Boutique, shortlisted in the Best Retail Interior Awards 2008 in London.
- 2011 MI+CASA
- 2011 The Constellation, Diamond Hotel
- 2014 Mesa
- 2014 VASK
- 2015 Brutalist House
- 2015 Envelope House
- 2015 Bolean House
- 2019 Infinity House
- 2024 Asador Alfonso

== Solo and group exhibitions ==
- 2011 Grammar of Movement, Ayala Museum, Makati, Philippines
- 2013 Greenstallations, Nuvali, Laguna, Philippines
- 2014 Carlo Calma: Golden Horse Perforations, Makati Shangrila Lobby, Makati, Philippines
- 2014 Obsession + Fetishes by Carlo Calma, Manifesto Gallerie, Philippines

== Public installations ==
- 2001 Eculer Series, Posh Salon and Gallery, Fillmore St., San Francisco, California, United States
- 2005 Novelist Solutions, Monster Architecture, AA Exhibit, London, UK
- 2006 Pimp my Ride, Movement in Architecture, AA Exhibit, London, UK
- 2007 Sweat Colonies, AA Exhibit, London, UK
- 2008 SESC Paraisopolis, Sustainable Environments, AA Exhibit, London, UK
- 2009 Self Help City Masterplan, Urban Farm, AA Exhibit, London, UK
- 2009 Grammar of Movement Series, Ayala Museum, Makati, Philippines
- 2011 Carlo Calma: Manufactured Landscapes 0, NOW Gallery, Manila, Philippines
- 2012 Carlo Calma: Manufactured Landscapes 1, ManilaArt (art fair), Philippines
- 2012 Carlo Calma: Cabinet Curiosities 1&2, Manila Art, Vask Gallery, Manila, Philippines
- 2013 Carlo Calma: Get Sassooned Installations, pop-up installation by Mega Group Inc., Philippines
- 2013 Carlo Calma: Green Installations, Public Garden Art in Nuvali, Philippines
- 2014 Topography, Magnum Art Installations, SM Aura, Taguig, Philippines
- 2014 Carlo Calma: Solaire 2, Manufactured Landscapes 3, Solaire, Parañaque, Philippines
