= Karamata Family House =

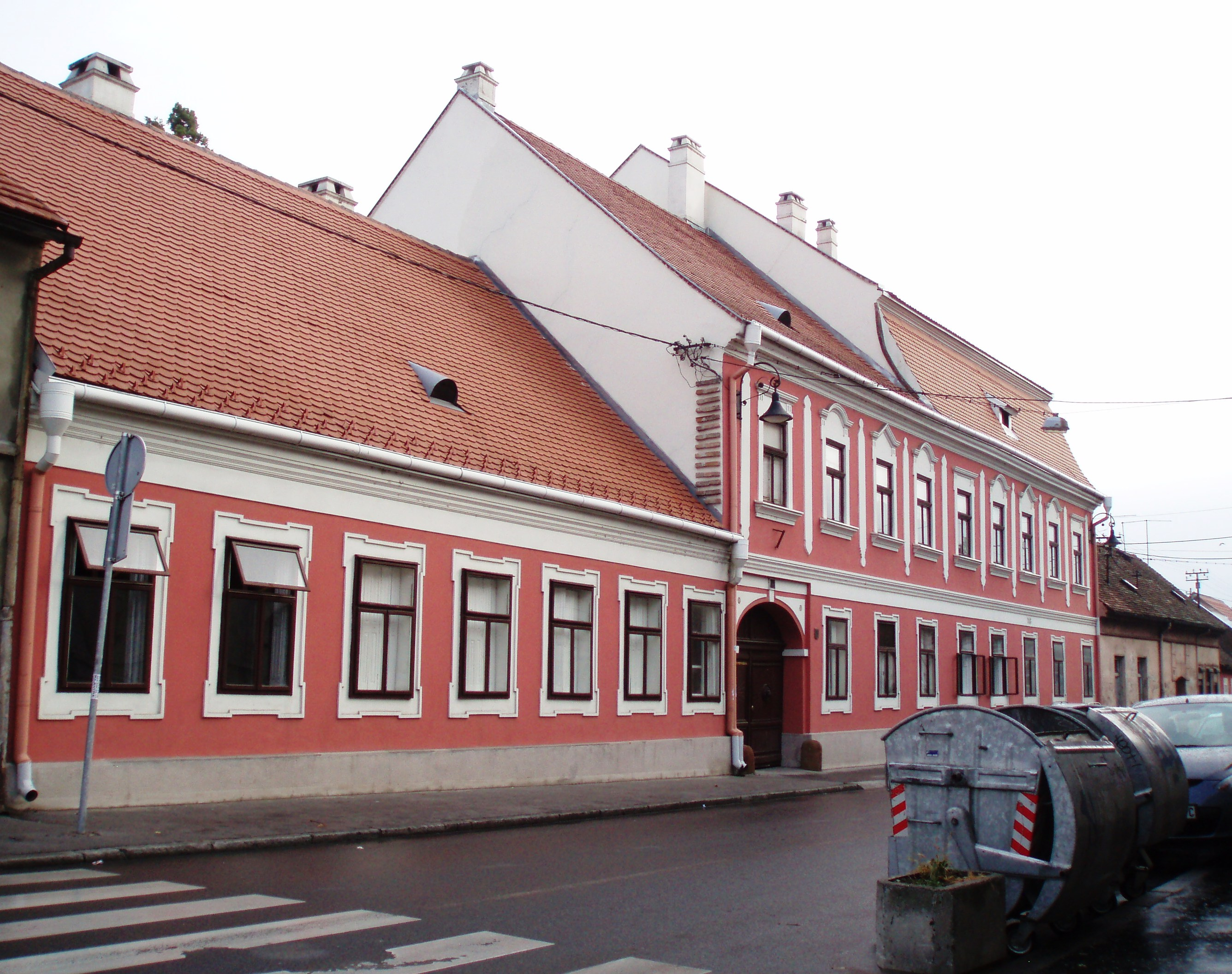
- Karamata Family House

- Location within Serbia

General information
- Status: Cultural Heritage of Great Importance
- Location: Zemun-Belgrade, Serbia Karamatina 17
- Coordinates: 44°50′47″N 20°24′41″E
- Completed: 1783/1827
- Cost: 8.000 Hungarian forint
- Owner: Karamata Family

Technical details
- Floor count: 1

Karamata family house is the cultural monument. It represents the cultural property of a great importance to Belgrade and is situated in Zemun, at 17 Karamatina Street.

== The Description ==
The house consists of three parts: ground floor, one floor with a simple roof and one floor with a cellar and mansard roof. All of the three parts are connected with a uniform facade and one main entrance. The highest part of the house was built in 1764 by a rich merchant from Zemun, Kuzman Jovanović. In 1772, the house was bought for 4,000 forints by Dimitrije Karamata, an immigrant from Katranitsa in Aegean Macedonia which at that time belonged to Turkey (nowadays Pyrgoi, Greece). Since then the house has been in the possession of the Karamata family.

In the plans of Zemun from the late 18th century, the house has the present-day volume. Jovan Karamat, son of Dimitrije, built a new story to the middle part of the house and finished the overall adaptation of the building in 1827. The facade is designed in the style of classicism, whereas the building as a whole had the characteristics of a typical baroque town residential building. The former Baroque gate was in the eastern part of the house. The builders of the house have remained unknown so far, and the original plans are lost. The house represents one of the most significant monuments of the old downtown of Zemun.

At the time of the Austro-Ottoman war, in 1788, Emperor Joseph II stayed in the Karamata family house, along with his headquarter members. The house was also the venue of the War Council with Josef II, field-marshals Lacy and Laudon. For that occasion, a big Austrian two-headed eagle, carved in wood and colored, probably the work of a local carver, was placed on the ceiling of the first floor, along with the symbols of the Monarchy. During the Revolutions of 1848 in the Austrian Empire, Serbian patriarch Josif Rajačić stayed in the house. The house was also the venue of the meetings of the Main National Board of the Voivodeship of Serbia and Banat of Temeschwar, where Atanas Karamata at the time was its treasurer. Vuk Stefanović Karadžić was also one of the prominent persons who stayed in the house. The architects of the house are not known and there are no original plans.

During the period of Serbian movement 1848-49, in the autumn of 1848 Serbian Patriarch, ecclesiastical and political leader of Serbs in Vojvodina of that time - Josif Rajačić lived in the house, along with the main committee, and in it were held sessions of the General People's Committee of Serbians in Vojvodina, where he was cashing Atanas Karamat (today rang the Minister of Finance). The first '' assignee '' of 13 August 1848, and all subsequent, on the right side was signed predsedatelj president Stevan Šupljikac, a left Athanasius Karamat.

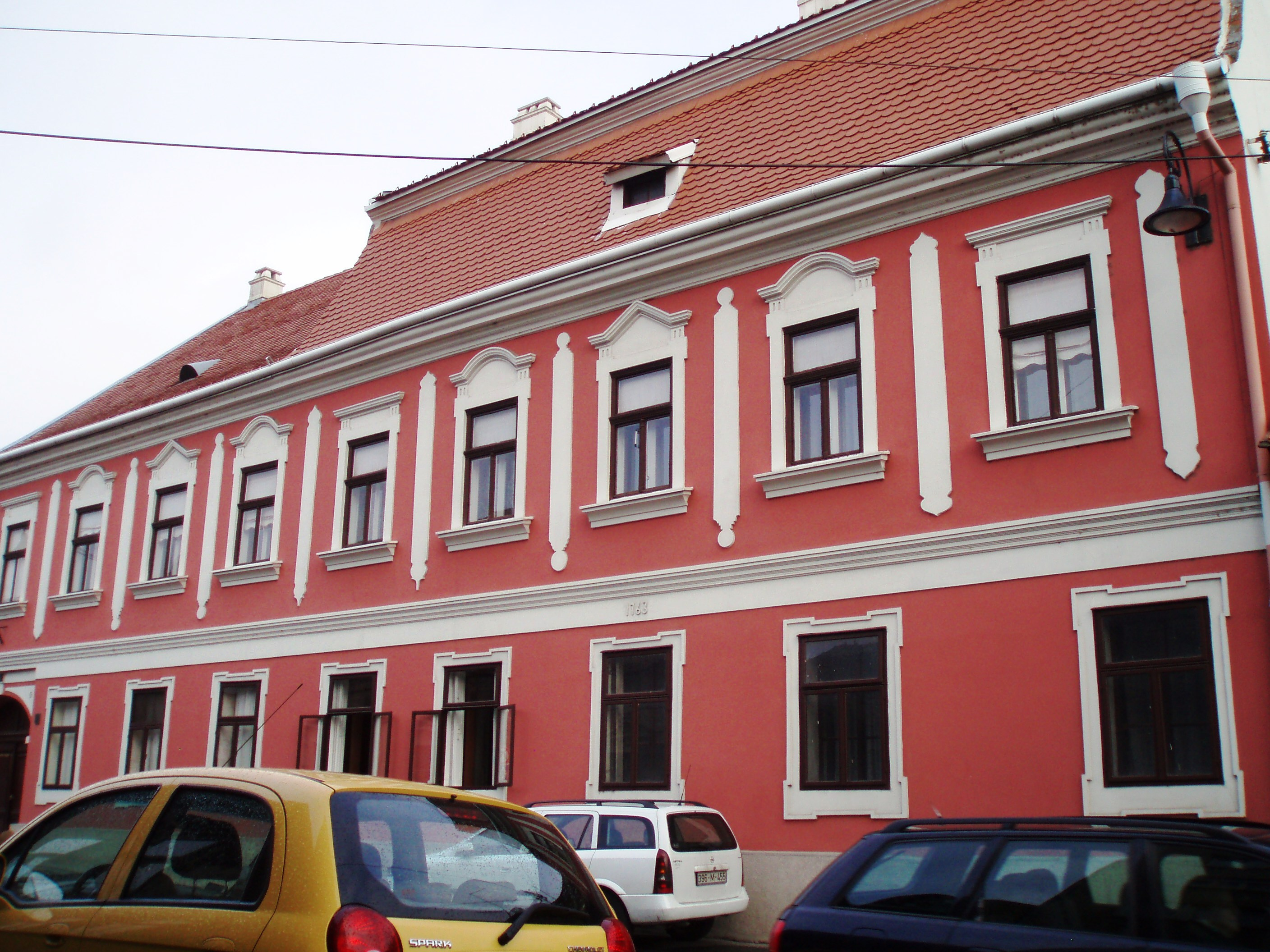
The appearance from Karamata Street

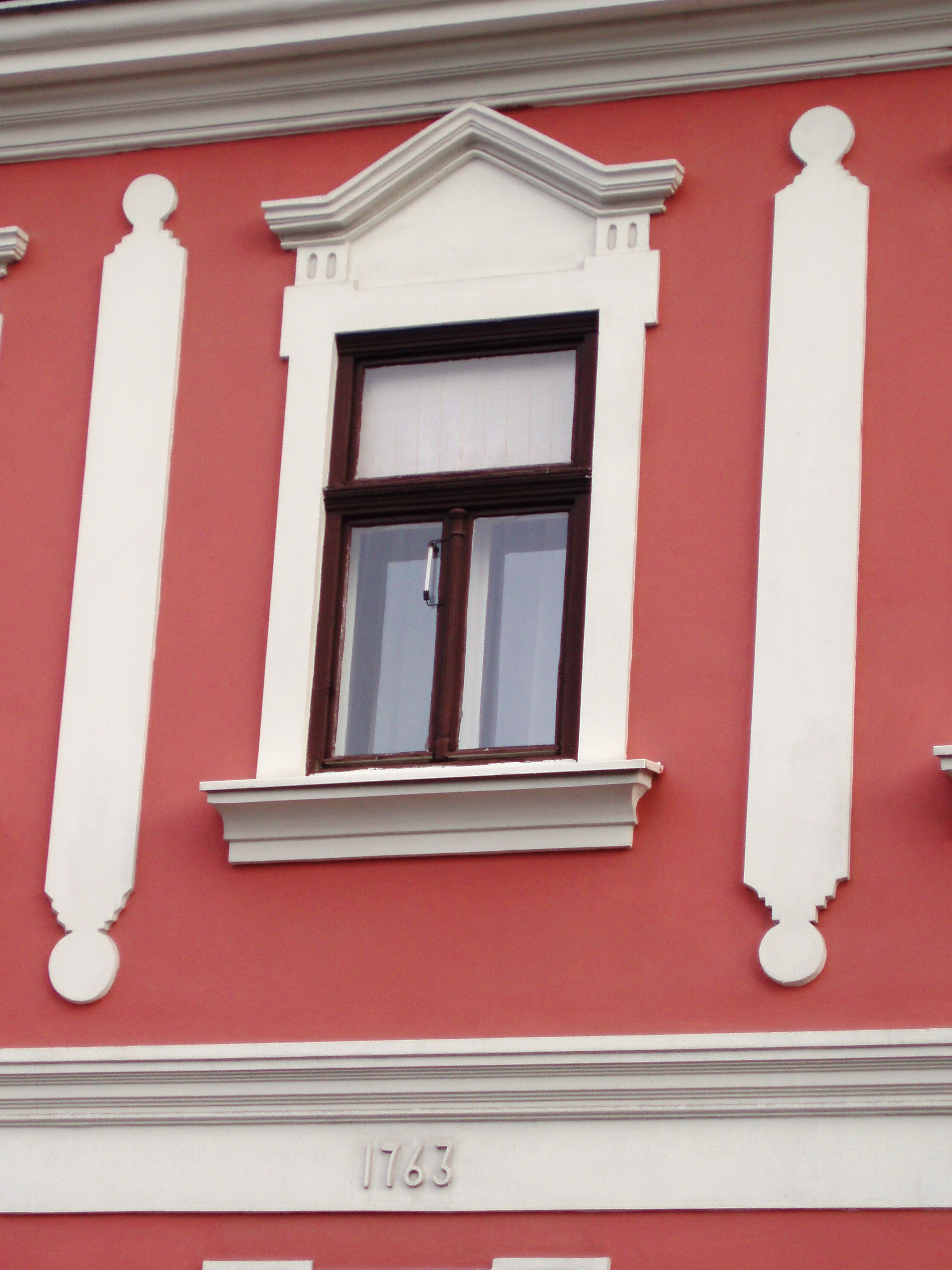
A detail with the year of construction

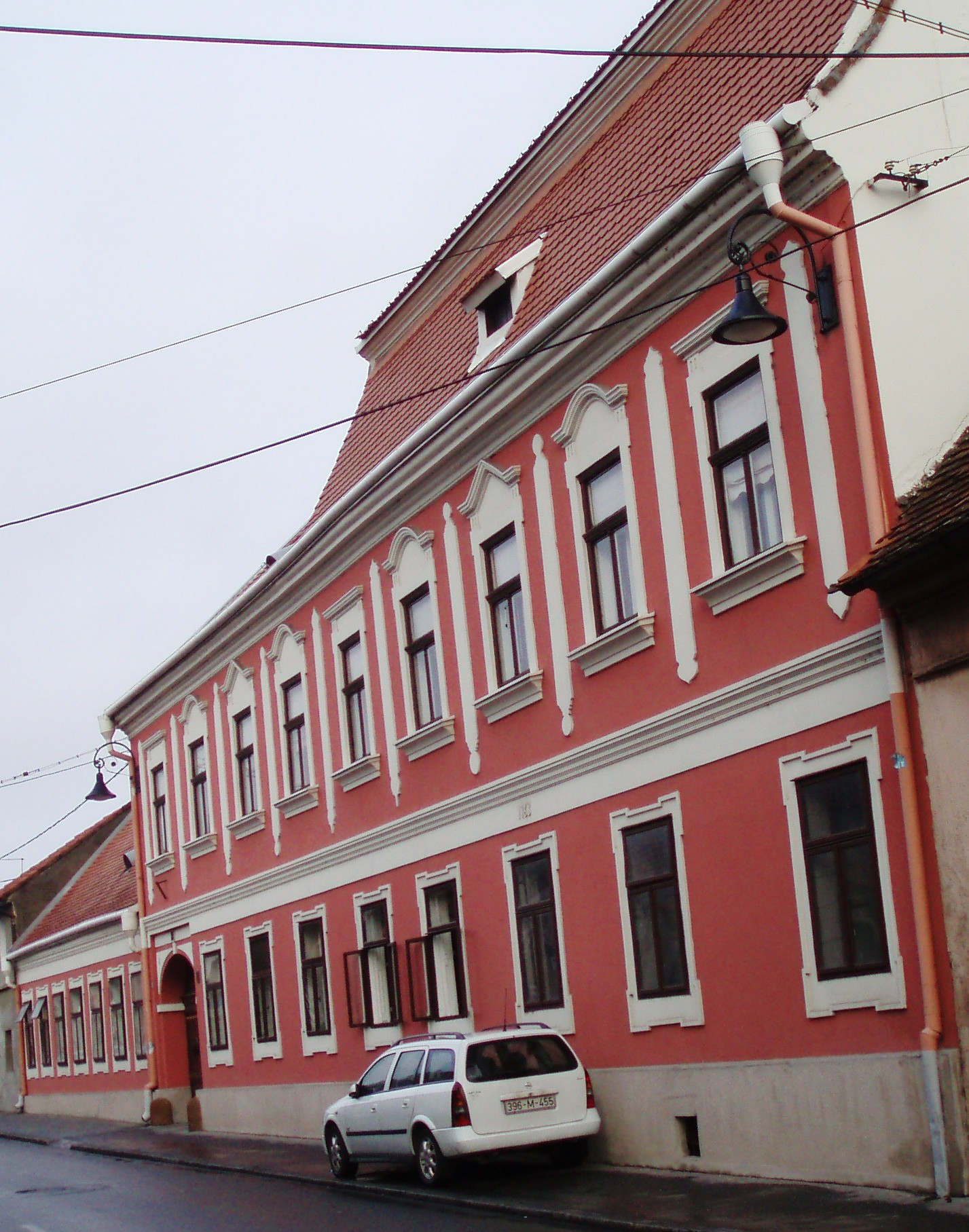
The appearance from the Danube side

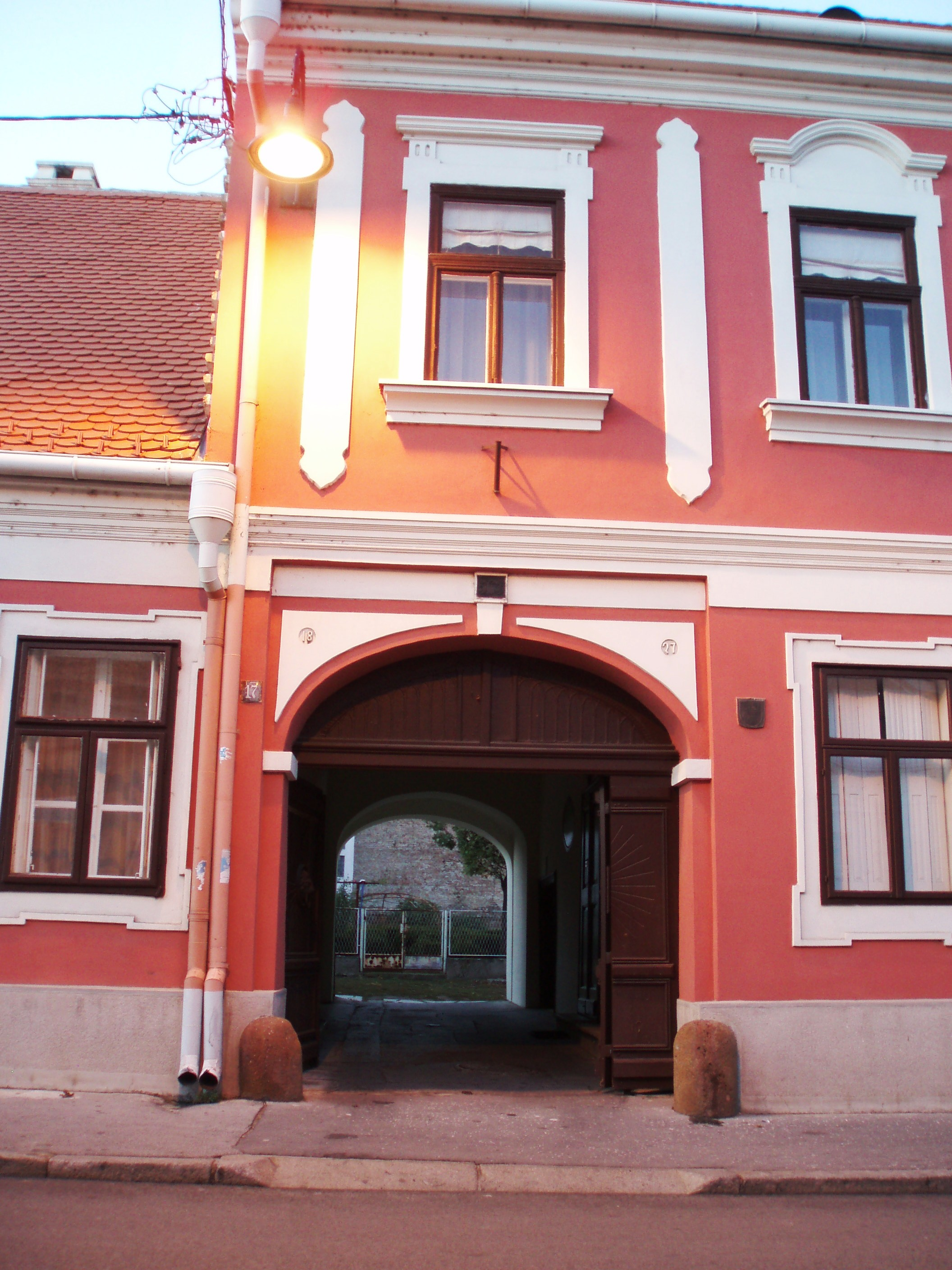
The appearance of the part of the house with the door

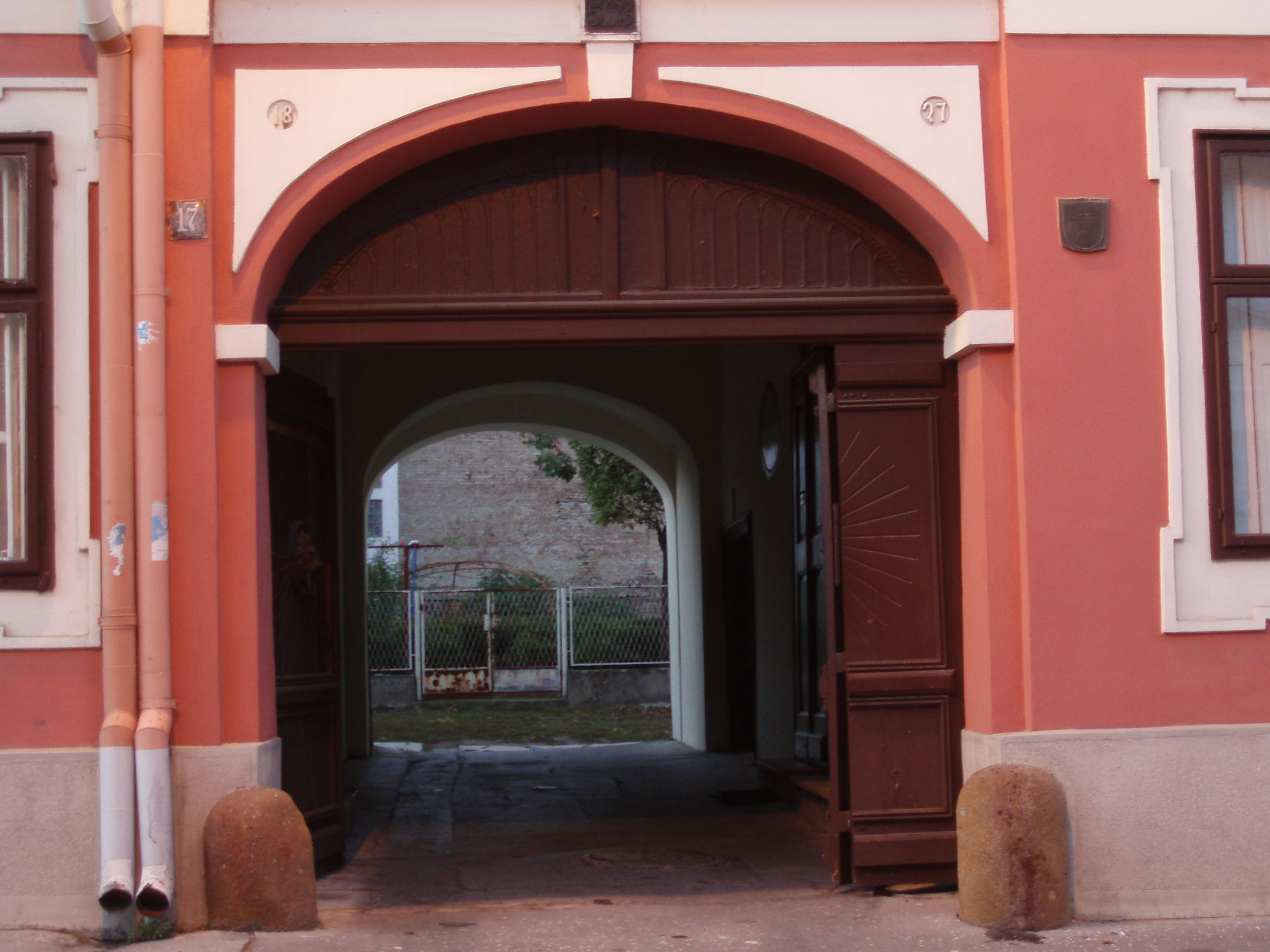
A detail at the entrance door
