= Kraljevci, Ruma =

Kraljevci Краљевци (Serbian)
- Village (Selo)
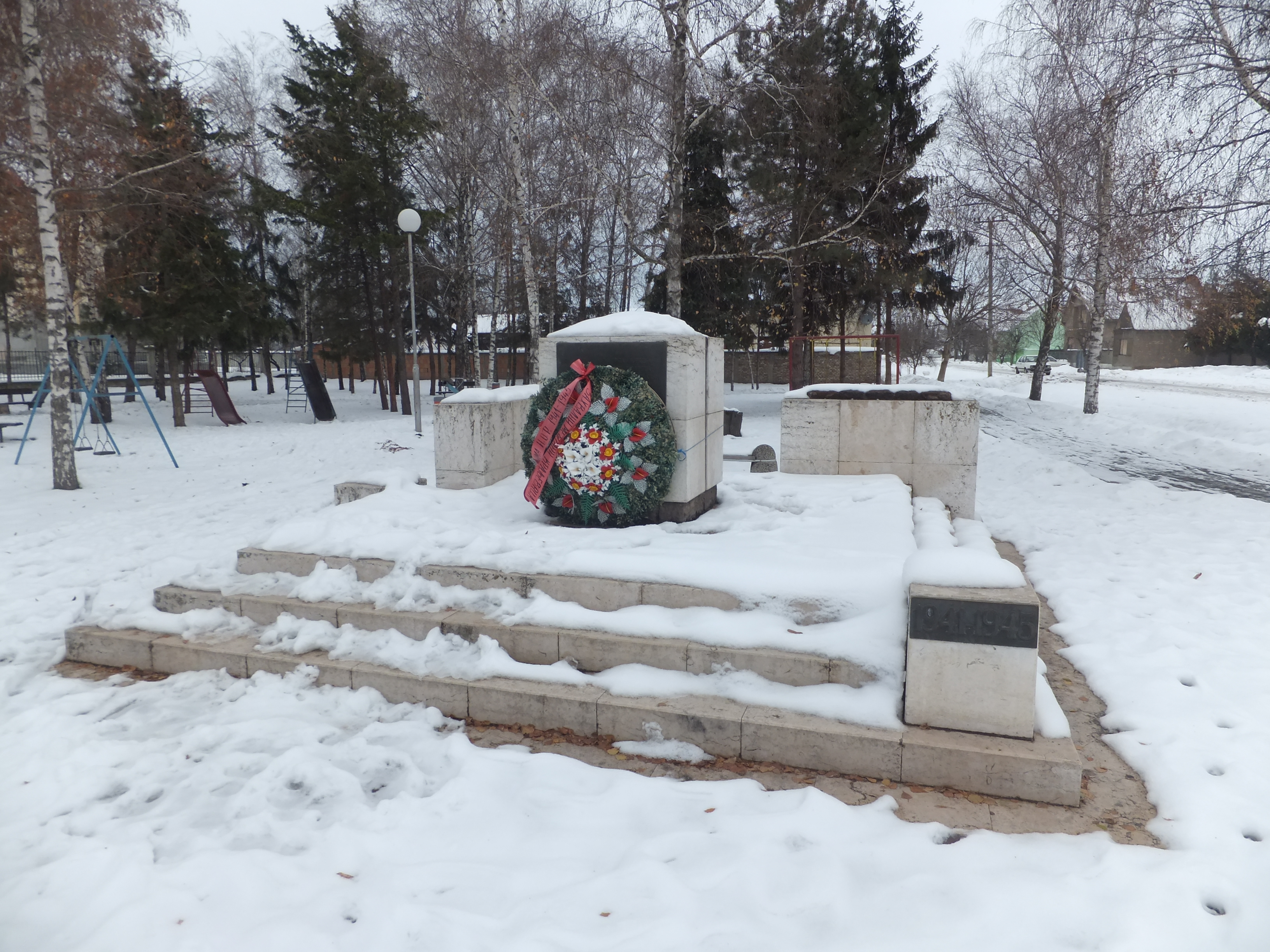

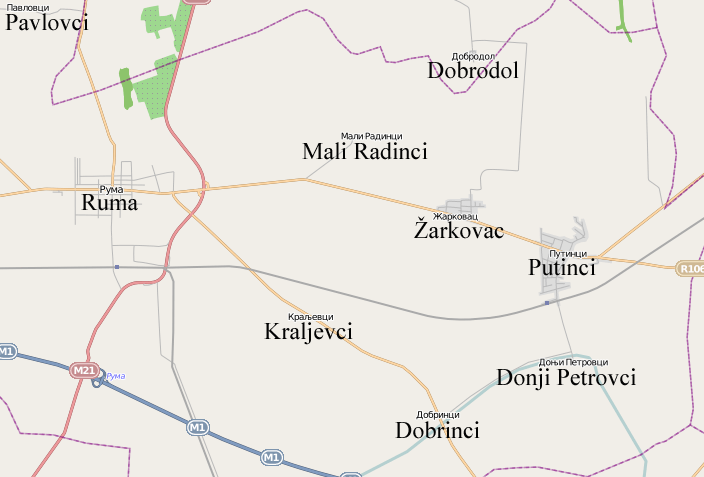

- Location within Vojvodina Location within Serbia Location within Europe
- Coordinates: 44°59′N 19°53′E
- Country: Serbia
- Province: Vojvodina
- Region: Syrmia
- District: Srem
- Municipality: Ruma

Population (2002)
  - Total: 1,232
- Time zone: UTC+1 (CET)
  - Summer (DST): UTC+2 (CEST)

Kraljevci (Serbian Cyrillic: Краљевци) is a village in Serbia. It is situated in the Ruma municipality, in the Srem District, Vojvodina province. The village has a Serb ethnic majority and its population numbering 1,232 people (2002 census).

== Name ==
The name of the town in Serbian is plural.

== See also ==
- List of places in Serbia
- List of cities, towns and villages in Vojvodina
