= Stefan Tenecki =

Serbian painter

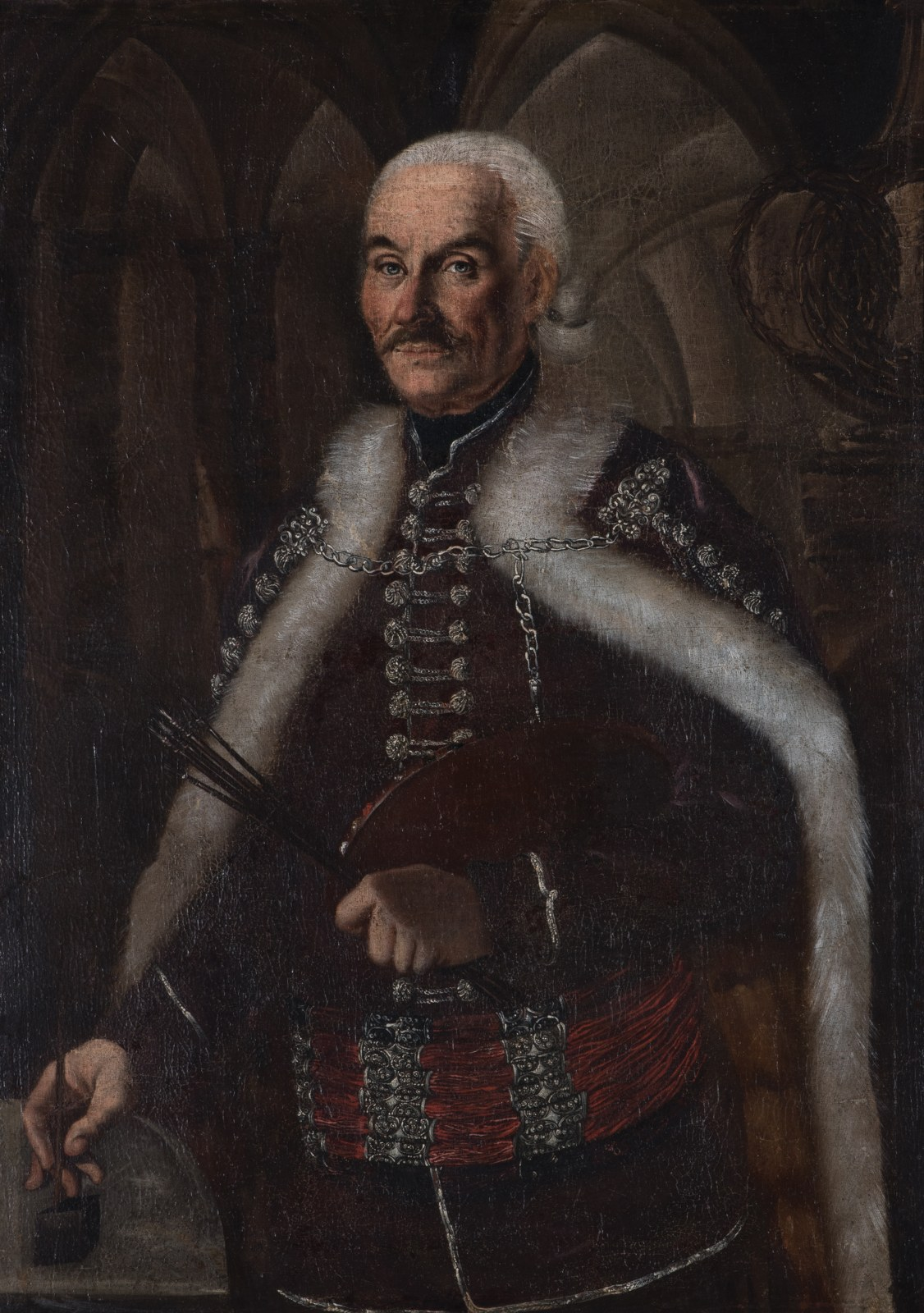
- Self-portrait of Stefan Tenecki in the Gallery of Matica Srpska
- Born: Stefan Tenecki; 1720; Lipova, Arad
- Died: 1789 (aged 68–69); Certege, Alba (near Câmpeni)
- Notable work: Self-portrait, Rakoczi's rebel, Austrian cavalier, Portrait of Sava Tekelija
- Movement: Baroque

Stefan Tenecki (Serbian: Стефан Тенецки; 1720 in Romanian Ștefan Tenețchi; Lipova, Arad, Habsburg monarchy – 1789 in Certege, Alba (near Câmpeni), Habsburg Monarchy) was a prolific Serbian icon painter of Aromanian origin who developed a rich artistic activity in Serbia, Romania and Hungary in the eighteenth century. Tenecki is regarded as the first painter who adapted the Byzantine tradition with the style of the Baroque to the needs of Orthodox Serbs and Romanians.

== Biography ==
Stefan Tenecki was born in the town of Lipova, near the city of Arad, in 1720. He was among the first Serbian artists to study painting in Kiev and at the Vienna Academy. His work was sought by several Serbian bishops in the course of his long career as an artist, Tenecki was an example of the Russian and Ukrainian Baroque style. Observing the talent of this young painter, Serbian Orthodox Bishop Isaja Antonović of Arad and Metropolitan of Karlovci (1731-1749) sent Tenecki to study at the painting school of Kiev Pechersk Lavra. After completing his studies in Kiev, Imperial Russia, he continued to perfect his art at the Vienna Academy of Painting. After graduating from the Academy, he began taking important commission works from the Arad bishops Isaija Antonović, Pavle Nenadović (1748-1749), Sinesija Živanović (1749-1768) and Pahomije Knežević (1769-1783). He developed an intense activity as a painter of icons, thus lining himself among the most important and influential painters of the second half of the 18th century.

Later, he was a senator in the municipal council of Arad, in which status he portrayed himself in what would become the first self-portrait in Serbian painting.

The family residence in Arad (since 1746) and his loyalty to that town did not lessen his mobility, and he was willing to work on a great number of Serbian Orthodox Church commissions from Fruška Gora and Banat to Transylvania in the Carpathian Mountains.

In 1747, he married Maria Mihailović, the daughter of Stojko Mihajlović of Arad. Stefan and Maria had ten children, of whom two, Atanasije and Mihajlo chose their father's career as artists.

He died in Certege, near Câmpeni, in 1798.

== Works ==
=== Paintings ===
Pavle Tekelija, (1749)

Rakoczi's rebel on horse, (1750)

Austrian imperial cavalier, (1750)

Jovan Popovic, (1770)

Ranko Tekelija, (1740-50)

Lazar Tekelija, (1773)

Saint Emperor Uros, Saint Prince Lazar and Saint Theodor Tiron, (1764)

Saint Stefan Siljanovic the Venerable, Saint Simeon of Serbia, Saint Archbishop Sava of Serbia and Saint Arsenije, (1764)

Tri Holy Hierarchs, (1764)

=== Iconostasis ===
In Serbia (Vojvodina):

- 1752: Iconostasis of the Stefan Dečanski Church in Vilovo
- Iconostasis in the Church of Vaznesenje in Ruma
- Frescoes in the church of the Krušedol Monastery
- Iconostasis of the old Serbian Orthodox church in the village of Opatovac in 1758

In Romania:

- Iconostasis of the old Serbian Orthodox Episcopal Palace in Arad
- 1765: Iconostasis of the Greek Catholic Cathedral of the Holy Trinity in Blaj
- Old Iconostasis of the Serbian Orthodox Monastery in Bezdin

== See also ==
- List of painters from Serbia
- Teodor Ilić Češljar
- Jakov Orfelin
- Jovan Isailović
- Stefan Gavrilovic
- Mojsije Subotić
- Georgije Tenecki
