= Čalma =

Čalma Чалма (Serbian)
- Village (Selo)
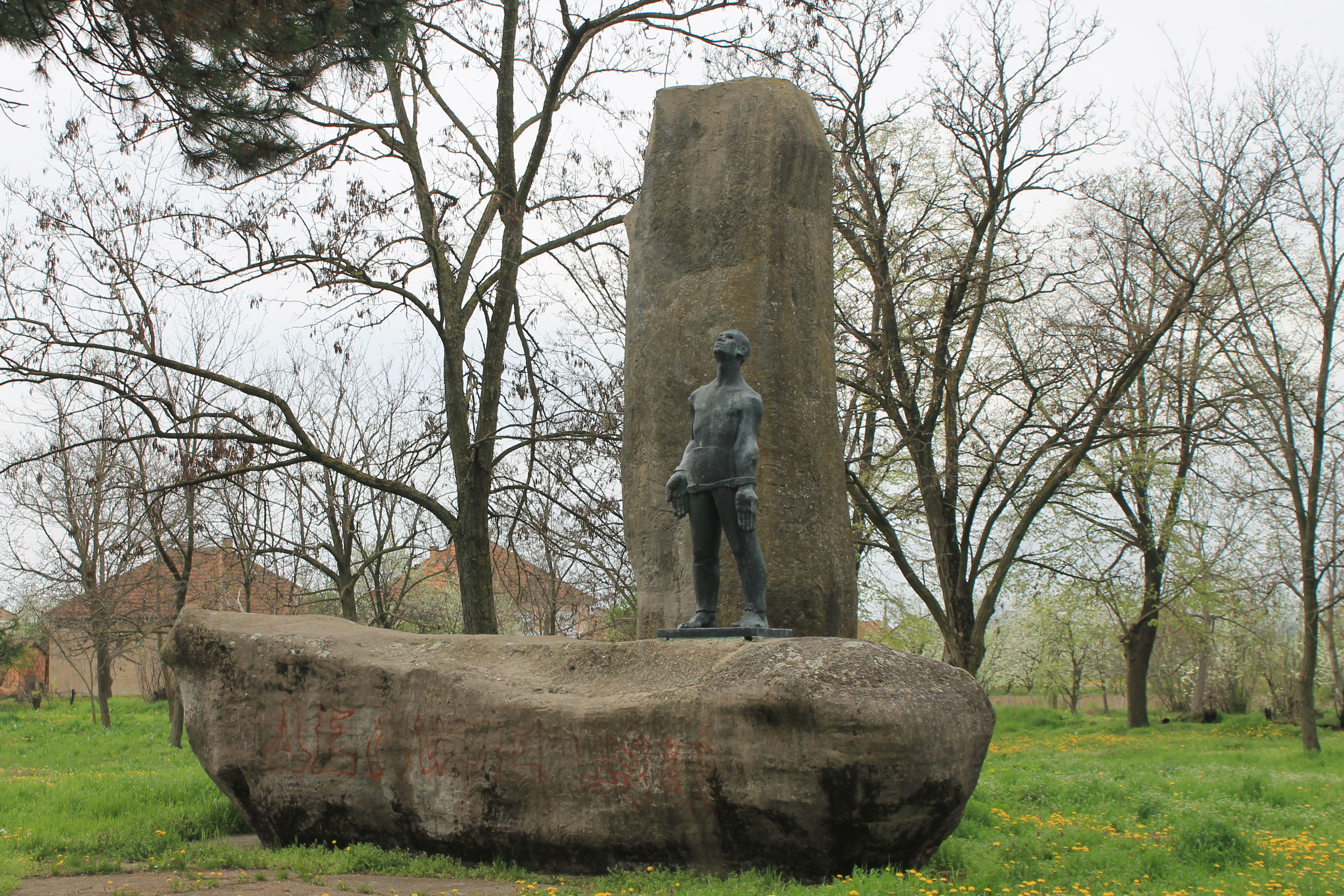

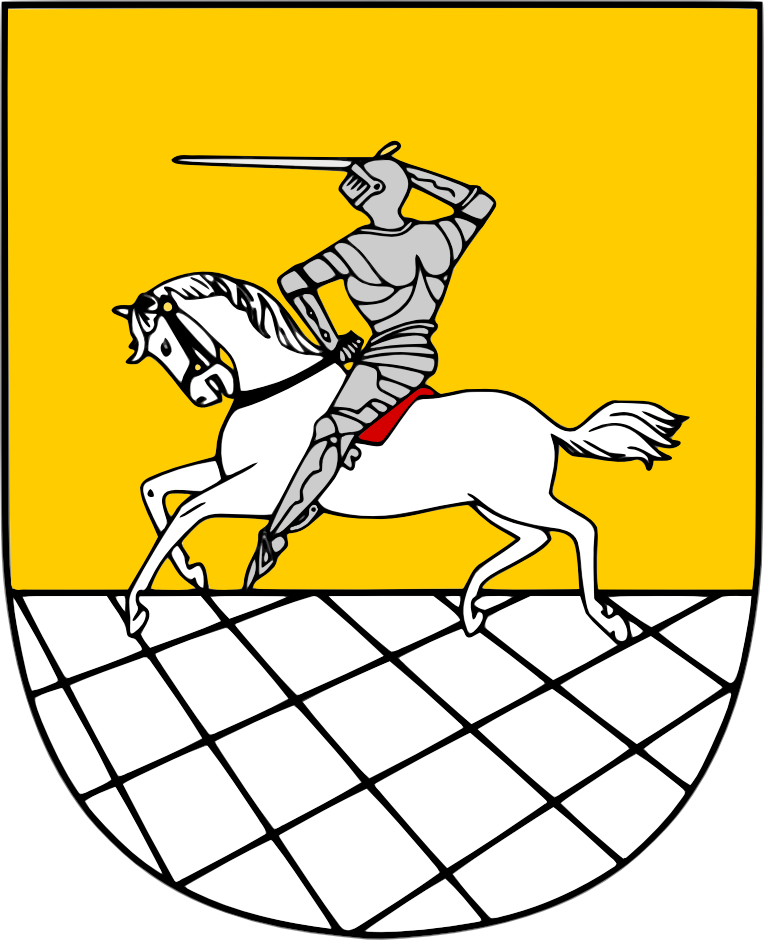
- Seal

- Location within Vojvodina Location within Serbia Location within Europe
- Country: Serbia
- Province: Vojvodina
- Region: Syrmia
- District: Srem
- Municipality: Sremska Mitrovica

Population (2002)
  - Total: 1,675
- Time zone: UTC+1 (CET)
  - Summer (DST): UTC+2 (CEST)

Čalma (Serbian Cyrillic: Чалма) is a village located in the Sremska Mitrovica municipality, in the Syrmia District of Vojvodina, Serbia. It is situated in the autonomous province of Vojvodina. The village has a Serb ethnic majority and its population numbering 1,675 people (2002 census).

== Name ==
In Serbian, the village is known as Čalma (Чалма), in Croatian as Čalma, in Hungarian as Csalma, and in German as Tschalma.

== Demographics ==
Ethnic groups (2002 census):

- Serbs = 1,634 (97.55%)
- Croats = 14 (0.84%)
- others.

The ethnic Germans consisted half of the village population before The Second World War.

== Historical population ==
- 1961: 1,704
- 1971: 1,787
- 1981: 1,855
- 1991: 1,776
- 2002: 1,675

== See also ==
- List of places in Serbia
- List of cities, towns and villages in Vojvodina
