= Georgije Tenecki =

Serbian Baroque painter

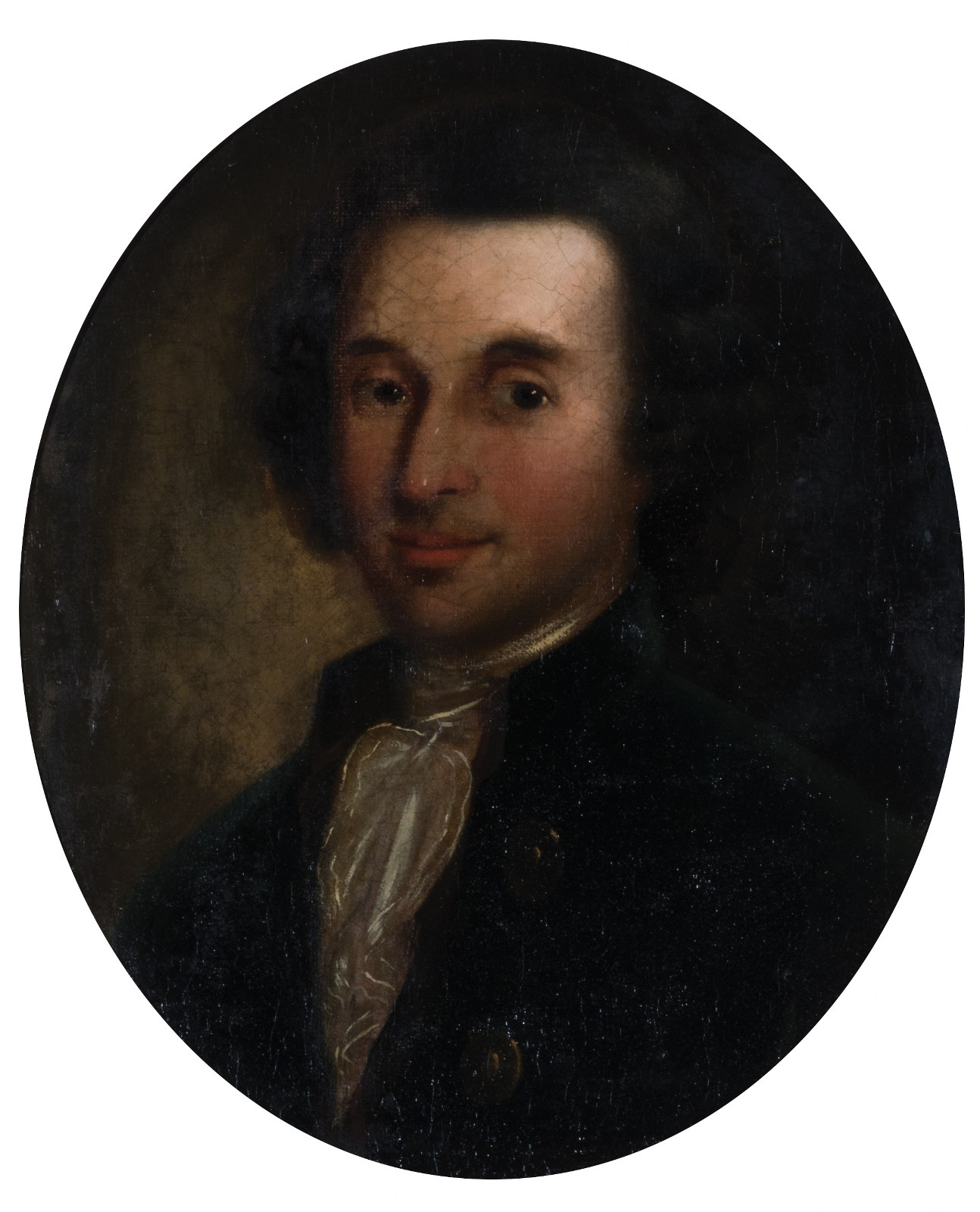
Portrait of a young Sava Tekelija, c. 1786, in the Gallery of Matica Srpska

Georgije Tenecki was a Serbian Rococo and Baroque painter who became well known among the prominent families in Banat for his portraits in the 18th century. He is best remembered for the portraits of three members of the Karamata family. Also, a portrait of young Sava Tekelija, painted by Georgije Tenecki in 1780, is part of the collection of Gallery of Matica Srpska

Georgije Tenecki is related to painter Pahomije Tenecki of the 17th century.

== Gallery ==
Young Karamata, (1785)

== See also ==
- List of Serbian painters
