= Mojsije Subotić =

Serbian painter

Resurrection of Jesus (1785)

Mojsije Subotić (c.1730–1789) was born in Syrmia County and was among the first Serbian painters to be academically educated in art at Vienna.

== Work ==
The dominance of Western orientation in Serbian religious painting in the eighteenth century is seen in the iconostases of Subotić in the village of Martinci and in the Serbian Orthodox Church of St. George in the village of Veliki Bastaji (1785), both done in baroque and rococo styles. In the third tier on the iconostasis in Bastaji, a standing Mother of God with outstretched arms and a dove on her breast is represented amongst the prophets. A dove is a symbol of the Holy Spirit, and in Austrian church art represents a form of the Annunciation.

The most complete gallery of Serbian rulers and saints is depicted in the second tier. Instead of representations of the Mother of God and St. John the Baptist, there are figures of Saint Sava and St. Simon, who are presenting Serbian rulers and saints to Christ.

== Gallery ==
Crowning Mary (1782)

Prince Lazar (1785)

Tsar Uroš (1785)
