= Stemmatographia (1741) =

1741 work by Hristofor Zhefarovich

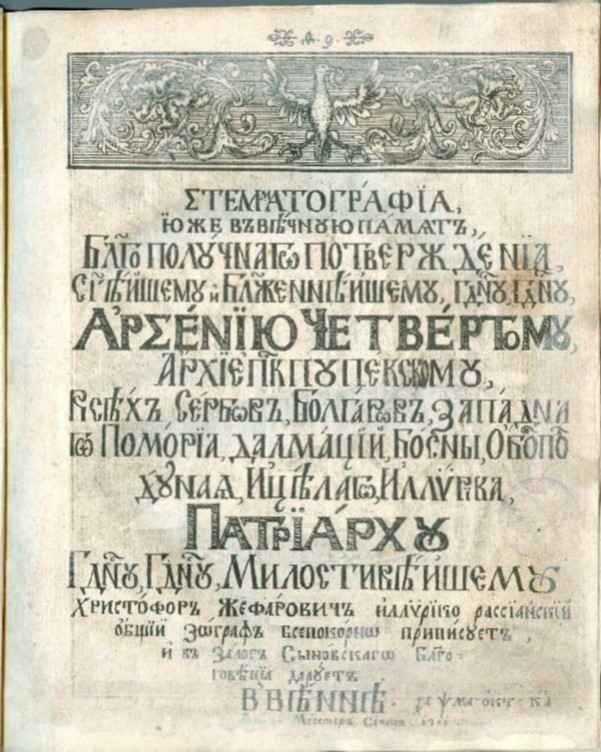
- Author: Hristofor Žefarović
- Original title: Стематография, Изображение оружий илирических
- Translator: Hristofor Žefarović
- Illustrator: Hristofor Žefarović
- Language: Serbian
- Subject: armorial
- Published: 1701
- Publication place: Vienna

The Stemmatografia (Slavonic-Serbian: Стематография, Serbian: Стематографија, Latin: Stemmatographia) was a 1741 book commissioned by the Serbian Orthodox Metropolitan of Karlovci, funded by Arsenije IV Jovanović Šakabenta, illustrated by Bulgarian–Serbian artist and writer Hristofor Žefarović (fl. 1734–1741), who translated and reillustrated the Stemmatographia (1701) of Austrian–Croatian Pavao Ritter Vitezović (1652–1713), who in turn based it on Mavro Orbini's Il Regno de gli Slavi (1601).

== History ==
In 1701, Austrian–Croatian historian and artist Pavao Ritter Vitezović (1652–1713) published Stemmatographia in Vienna, in Latin, including 56 coat of arms of Slavic and "Illyrian" (South Slavic) lands. He used examples from the Illyrian Armorials and other armorials. In 1741, Hristofor Žefarović translated into Serbian and reillustrated the 1701 work, with added portraits of Serbian saints and emperor Stefan Dušan (r. 1331–1355). The engravings were made by Toma Mesmer. Žefarović dedicated the work to Patriarch Arsenije IV Jovanović Šakabenta. All coat of arms are the same as in the 1701 work, except that for Raška.

The book was commissioned by the Serbian Orthodox Metropolitan of Karlovci, and funded by Arsenije IV.

The Stemmatografia of Žefarović had immense influence on the Serbian Revolution, and the rebel generals used the coat of arms in it on seals and war flags. It was re-printed in 1972.

== Gallery ==
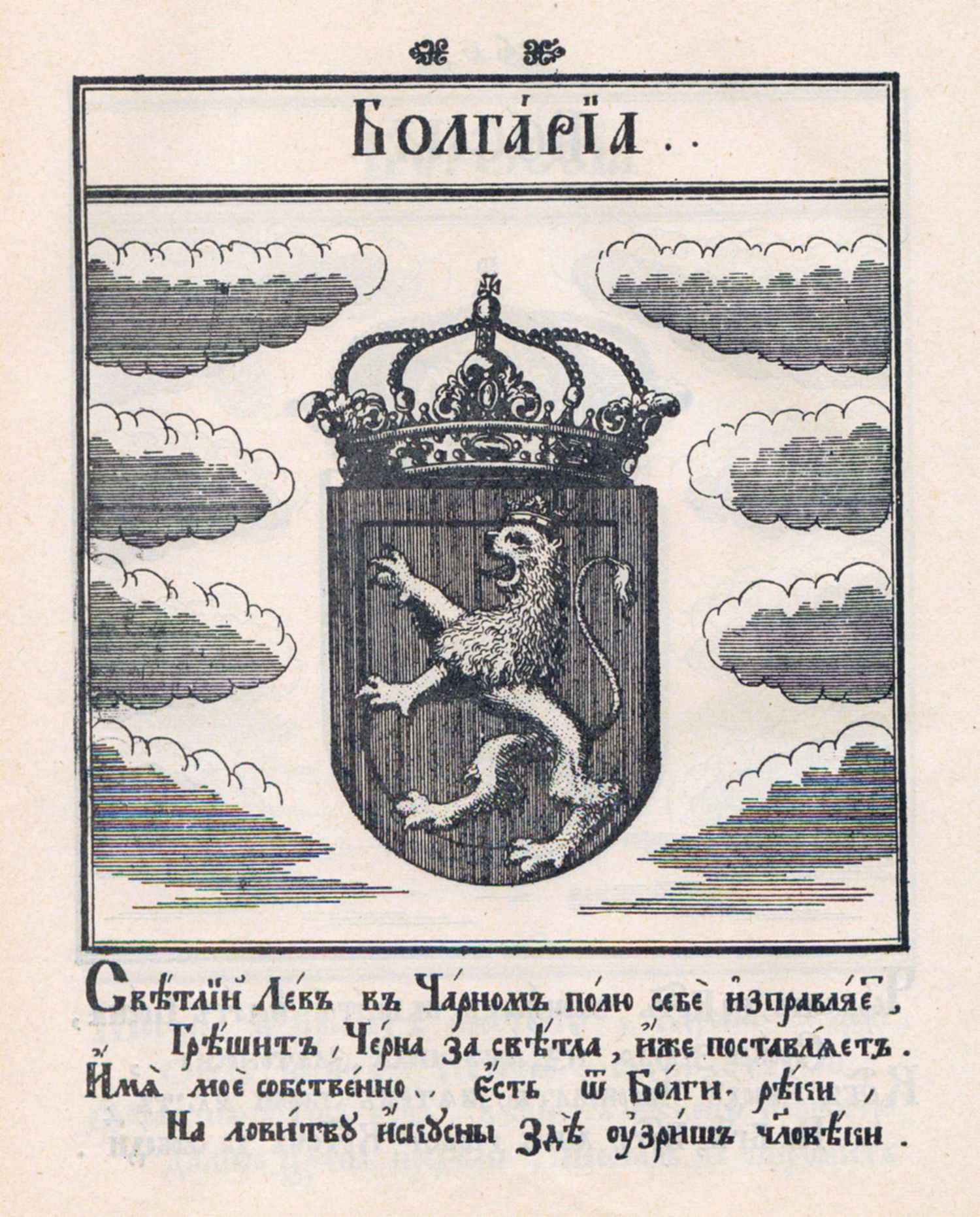
Bulgaria

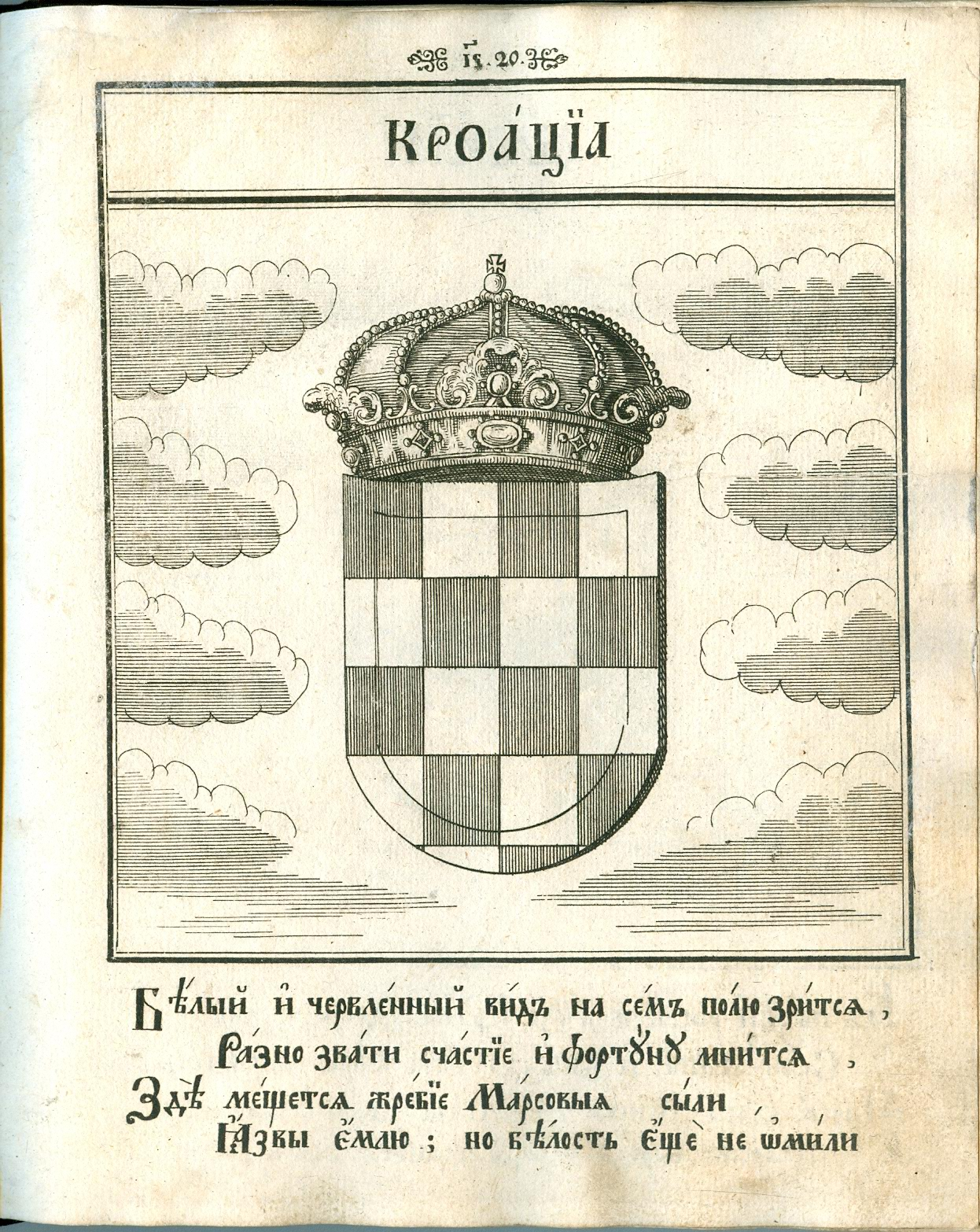
Croatia

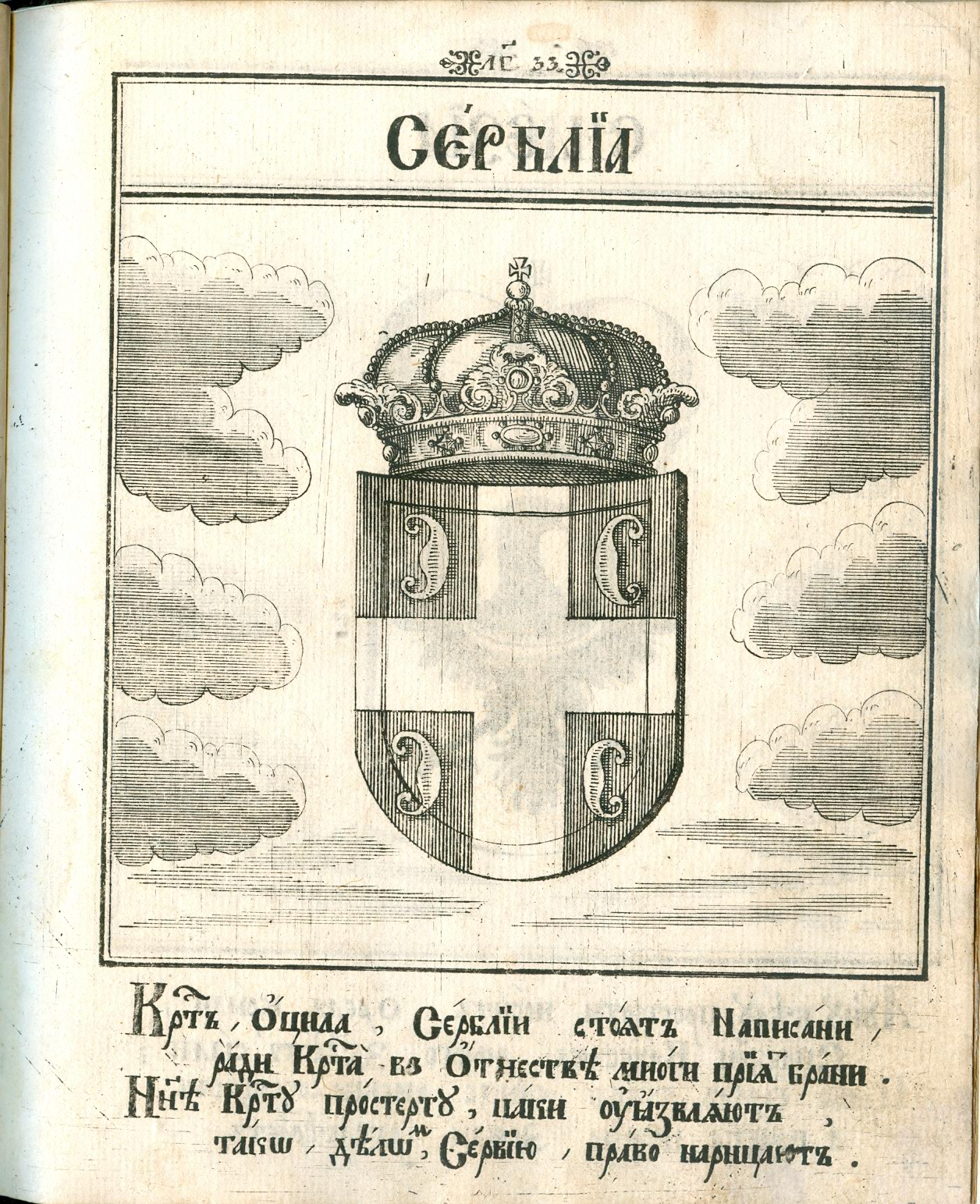
Serbia

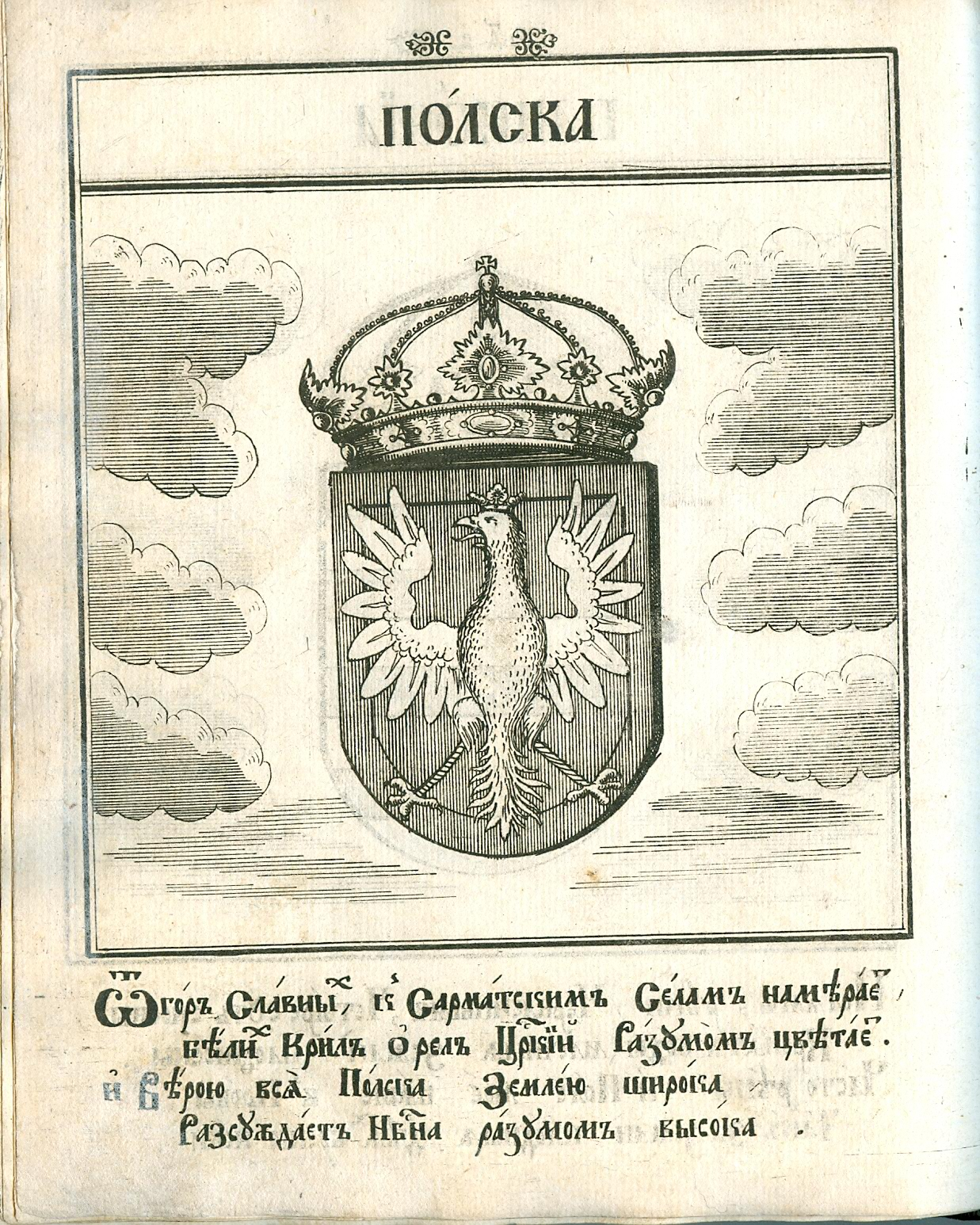
Poland

== See also ==
- Stemmatographia (1701)
- Illyrian Armorials

== Sources ==
- Kolundžija, Jovana (2016). "ÎNCEPUTUL TENDINȚELOR STILULUI BAROC ÎN CĂRȚILE SÂRBEȘTI ILUSTRATE STEMMATOGRAPHIA: ANALIZA PORTRETULUI ÎMPĂRATULUI DUSAN ÎNTRE CHRONOS ȘI MINERVA" [Beginning of Baroque Tendencies in the Serbian Illustrated Books Stemmatographia: Analysis Portrait of Emperor Dusan between Chronos and Minerva]. Studii de ştiinţă şi cultură. 12 (1): 183–190.
- Kostić, Miroslava (2016). "Art and the renewal of the medieval political tradition in the Metropolitanate of Karlovci in the mid-18th century.journal=Imagining the past. The reception of the Middle ages in Serbian art from the 18th to the 21st century": 47–58.
- Ninković, Nenad. "The Karlovci Archbishopric and the Legacy of Antiquity in 18th Century." Yearbook of the Society for 18th Century Studies on South Eastern Europe 7 (2024): 136-150.
- Palavestra, Aleksandar (2010). Илирски грбовници и други хералдички радови. Београд: Завод за уџбенике – via Academia.edu.
- Romanowska, Justyna (2014-11-26). "Stematografija Hristofora Žefarovicia jako dokument kulturowych i narodowych dążeń Serbów w pierwszej połowie XVIII wieku" [Stemmatographia” as a document of the cultural and national aspirations of the Serbs in the first half of the eighteenth century]. Adeptus (4). Institute of Slavic Studies Polish Academy of Sciences: 22–34. doi:10.11649/a.2014.017. ISSN 2300-0783.
