= Odiljenje sigetsko =

1684 poetic work by Pavao Ritter Vitezović

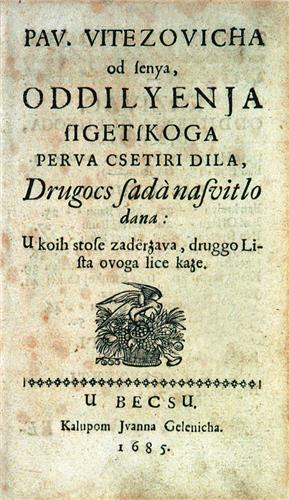
- Title page of the second edition of Odiljenje sigetsko (1685)
- Author: Pavao Ritter Vitezović
- Language: Croatian
- Genre: Lyric commentary
- Publisher: Gaspar Frajsmidović; Ivan Gelenić; Pavao Ritter Vitezović
- Publication date: 1684
- Publication place: Habsburg Monarchy
- Media type: Print (hardback)
- Pages: 88 pp

Odiljenje sigetsko (English: Farewell at Siget) is an intertextual poetic work by Pavao Ritter Vitezović first published in 1684. It is regarded as the first and most important vernacular piece by the author. Odiljenje sigetsko was written sometime between 1679 and 1682 and covers the 1566 Siege of Szigetvar relying on previous adaptations of the same subject.

Being particularly notable for its unusual form, there is a distinct lack of discernable classification regarding its genre, which often led to debates among literary historians. It is sometimes described as a "mosaic" incorporating a vast array of literary elements and devices, with a fragmented form. It was well received by its contemporaries, subsequently inspiring a number of authors in the 18th century.

== Form and interpretation ==
=== Classification ===
The most striking feature of the text is its unusual form, which had been a subject of controversy in earlier critical analyses. Historians originally perceived the work as an attempt to create an epic based on the Siege of Szigetvar, in similar vein as its predecessors Vazetje Sigeta Grada and Siege of Sziget. Most modern analysts, such as Nikica Kolumbić and Pavao Pavličić regard it as a lyrical commentary of Petar Zrinski's epic poem Obsida sigecka, stressing its intertextual features. According to Pavličić, Vitezović wanted to portray aspects which he considered important for shaping contemporary literature; reliance on tradition, foundation pertaining to themes which are socially or nationally important and accessibility to as many people as possible. More specifically, he argues its intent was to rework the existing epic in a lyric way, making it more accessible for people of lower education, but expanding and emphasizing certain aspects of it for programmatic and perhaps, political purposes. Vanja Budišćak classifies it as a kind of lyric-epic-dramatic hybrid, arguing that it isn't completely devoid of epic or even dramatic elements. Dunja Fališevac describes the form as innovative genre with baroque elements.

=== Structure ===
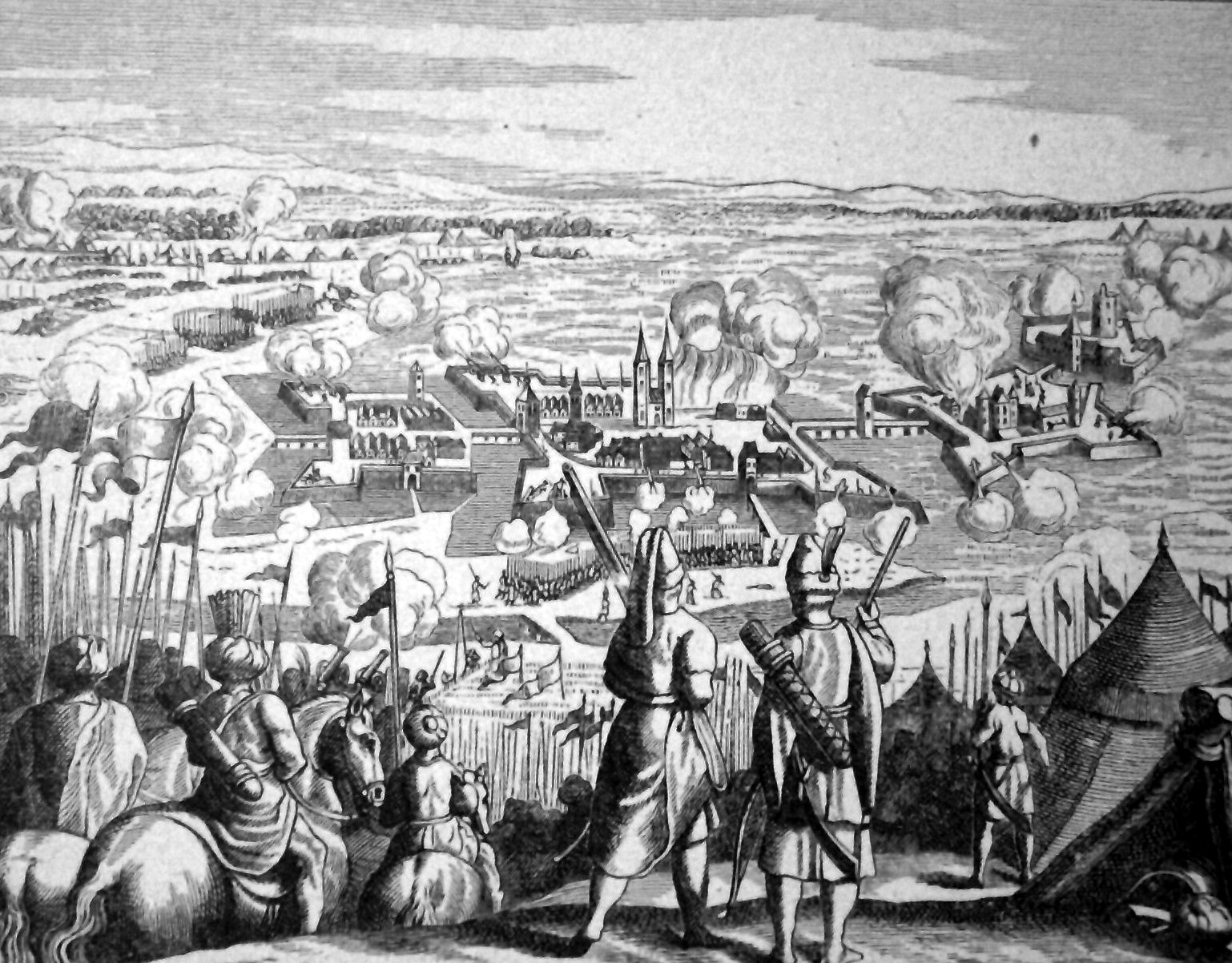
Siege of Szigetvár Fortress by overwhelming Ottomans

Odiljenje sigetsko takes a nostalgic and elegiac tone. It consists of four parts (dil), of which three consist of letters to other parties, monologues, or dialogues which express sorrow or departure at the end of after the aforementioned siege with the Ottomans. These parts utilize literary devices such as anthropomorphism and fantastic elements such as fairies. The dialogue between Sophia, the muse of one of the participants of the battle Gašpar Alapić and the hawk, who informs her of Alapić's death taking part shortly after the conclusion of the siege was a motive taken from a folk song. The last part provides shorter poems similar to occasional poetry which are called tombstones (nadgrobnice) and represent voices from a number of killed individuals such as Suleiman the Magnificent and Nikola Šubić Zrinski. Proverbs are particularly present throughout Odiljenje sigetsko, showing a tendency to bring it closer to lesser-educated parts of society. These largely deal with inevitability of death, appropriate for the subject of "farewell" during or after battle.

=== Meter and language ===
The meter is dominated by the northern doubly-rhymed dodecasyllable (a standard in Croatian literature since Judita), but it also uses a variety of other forms including the hexameter. Literary forms and inventions such as echoes are also present, along with Vitezović's experiments in homonymic rhymes. In the foreword of the first edition, Vitezović expresses his views on language, using a verse in defense of linguistic purism:

Človik najdičnije svoju halju nosi
a šta doma nije, to se vani prosi

The language was on a tri-dialectal basis, incorporating elements of Čakavian, Štokavian and Kajkavian, similar to the language used by authors from the Ozalj literary circle.

=== Portrayal of Ottomans ===
The depiction of Turks is a departure from earlier works on the overall subject, which show them in a stereotypically negative light. Vitezović, conversely, gives a considerably more balanced view in which he praises their strength and acknowledges their motives to serve their leader and their people in the name of glory, thus equating them with the defenders. This is additionally emphasized in Vitezović's metaphor where Ottomans are equated with the "scourge of god", as means to bring Christians back on the right track from their sinful deviations.

== Creation ==
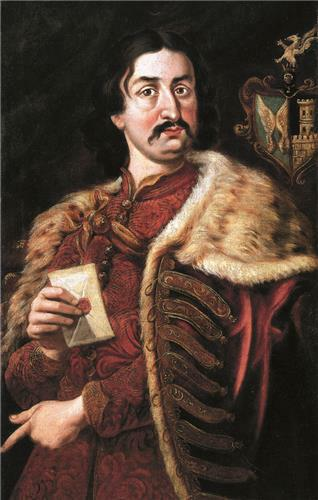
Motives were borrowed from Petar Zrinski's epic poem Obsida sigecka

Vitezović claimed to have written the work in 1679, which some historians put closer to 1682 instead. Vitezović intended to publish additional three parts, which never came to fruition, as some have speculated that what was initially written in 1679 was subsequently revised and shortened. Vitezović had political and historiographical motivation which likely inspired him to write Odiljenje sigetsko, but did not take away from his primarily lyrical and emotional worldview. The gradual weakening of the Ottoman threat from within the Habsburg monarchy led to espouse an ambition in retrieving the lands previously being part of Croatia within the same monarchy from the Ottomans. Vitezović served in the Habsburg-Ottoman wars around the time of writing and likely experienced motives he portrayed within the work such as death. The patron who financed the first edition was Adam Zrinski.

=== Publication history ===
It was initially published in Linz, which was followed by a reissue in 1685, Vienna. In 2016, a third edition was discovered in the library of the Lorand Eotvos University in Budapest. This edition was evidently self-published by Vitezović in Zagreb, 1695.

== Legacy ==
The details regarding the contemporary reception of Odiljenje sigetsko are uncertain due to lack of surviving documentation, but it is known that all printed copies were sold out by 1695, and that public interest continued to exist for a third edition. The work influenced a number of authors from the 18th century, who borrowed certain elements from the book for their own writing, such as Juraj Malevac, Luka Vladimirović, Antun Ivanošić, Mateša Antun Kuhačević and Andrija Kačić Miošić.

=== Modern critical assessment ===
The modern reception of Odiljenje sigetsko has been mixed. The book was reprinted in 1836, with renewed interest in Vitezović's works during the 19th century brought by the Illyrian movement, it was viewed in positive light. The following century, however, brought it under a more negative critical scrutiny. Mate Ujević dismissed the work as "artistically worthless" with Vitezović having little talent for poetry. This was echoed by many subsequent Croatian literary historians such as Milivoj Šrepel, Mihovil Kombol and Branko Vodnik, claiming a lack of cohesive structure and excessive reliance on the work of his predecessor. On the other, admitting he was adept at versification and noted certain "positive places". This predominantly negative initial assessment was subsequently challenged by newer authors such as Kolumbić and Pavličić on grounds that Vitezović's intentions and ideas were never fully recognized and, as such, no deeper analysis of the work was actually conducted. Both of them placed emphasis on the originality and uniqueness of the work, and not just within the context of Croatian literature, revising the view that Odiljenje sigetsko lacked the uniformity of structure. Pavličić underlines that Odiljenje sigetsko is "more important for understanding the literature that is derived from it, than its own literary accomplishments". He concludes that the work is therefore important as an experiment of poetics, which attempts reaching the literate populace to instil ideas pertaining to literature, or contemporary issues such as the Ottoman threat, which highlights the secondary nature of its character.

Kolumbić stated that Vitezović was more natural and varied in writing verse than many of his predecessors (such as Zrinski, Marulić), and has shown genuine virtuosity in some parts such as constructing hexameter lines, which are difficult to apply in Croatian. However, he criticized his lack of concision, often repeating the same thoughts, which is a trait he inherited from previous poets within the Croatian canon. Despite his ambition as a historian being viewed as detrimental to his poetic side, he is considered to have created admirable poetry in a number of places within the book. The section done in "echo verse" (Putnik i jeka) was particularly praised, being executed better than by previous authors (such as Zrinski, Gundulić) and achieving maximum unity between the appropriate mood and phonaesthetics. In her exhaustive analysis, Vanja Budišćak called it "one of the best works of the Croatian baroque" and one of the most peculiar in Croatian literature.

Noted German Slavist Reinhard Lauer regards Odiljenje sigetsko as an important linguistic step towards a unified Croatian poetic language, and as among the most astonishing poems covering the Siget subject.
