= Coat of arms of Bulgaria =

Versions
- Armiger: Republic of Bulgaria
- Adopted: 1997
- Shield: Gules, a lion rampant crowned Or
- Supporters: Two lions rampant Or crowned Or
- Compartment: Two crossed oak branches fructed proper
- Motto: „Съединението прави силата“ ("Strength through Unity")
- Other elements: The shield is ensigned with the crown of Bulgarian tsars of the Second Bulgarian state proper

The coat of arms of Bulgaria (Note: Bulgarian: Герб на България, pronounced [ˈɡɛrp na bɐɫˈɡarijɐ]) consists of a crowned golden lion rampant over a dark red shield; above the shield is the Bulgarian historical crown. The shield is supported by two crowned golden lions rampant; below the shield there is compartment in the shape of oak twigs and white bands with the national motto "Unity makes strength" inscribed on them.

== Description ==
The current coat of arms of Bulgaria was adopted in 1997. The current arms are a slightly redesigned version of the coat of arms of Bulgaria from the period 1927–1946. Those arms were based on a similar earlier form, firstly used by Tsar Ferdinand I (1887–1918) as his personal ruler's coat of arms. The previous emblem, which combined the traditional gold lion rampant with the pattern of the coat of arms of the Soviet Union, was abandoned since Communist rule ended in the country in 1989. The new Constitution of Bulgaria, adopted in 1991, describes the Bulgarian coat of arms as follows:

Art. 164. The coat of arms of the Republic of Bulgaria shall depict a gold lion rampant on a dark gules shield.

For many years, agreement on the design of the coat of arms was a source of great controversy in the Bulgarian government, as different parties argued over the design elements. The final design was legitimized in the Law for the coat of arms of the Republic of Bulgaria of 4 August 1997:

Coat of arms of the Republic of Bulgaria

Art. 1. The coat of arms of the Republic of Bulgaria shall be a state symbol expressing the independence and the sovereignty of the Bulgarian people and state.

Art. 2. (1) The coat of arms of the Republic of Bulgaria shall be a rampant golden crowned lion on a dark red field with the shape of a shield. Above the shield there shall be a big crown which originally were the crowns of Bulgarian Tsars (i.e. Emperors) of the Second Bulgarian state with five crosses pattée and another cross pattée over the crown. The shield shall be supported by two golden crowned rampant lions, turned towards the shield from the right and left heraldic sides. They shall stand above two crossed oak branches with fruits. Below the shield, over a white band put over the oak branches with a three-colored edge, shall be written with golden letters "Unity makes strength".

(2) The graphic and color image of the coat of arms according to the appendices shall be an inseparable part of this law.

Art. 3. (1) The coat of arms of the Republic of Bulgaria shall be depicted on the state seal in a way determined by a law for the state seal.

(2) The depiction of the coat of arms of the Republic of Bulgaria in other places as well as the reproduction of elements of the emblem on badges, commemoration medals etc. shall be admitted only by an act of the Council of Ministers.

== History ==
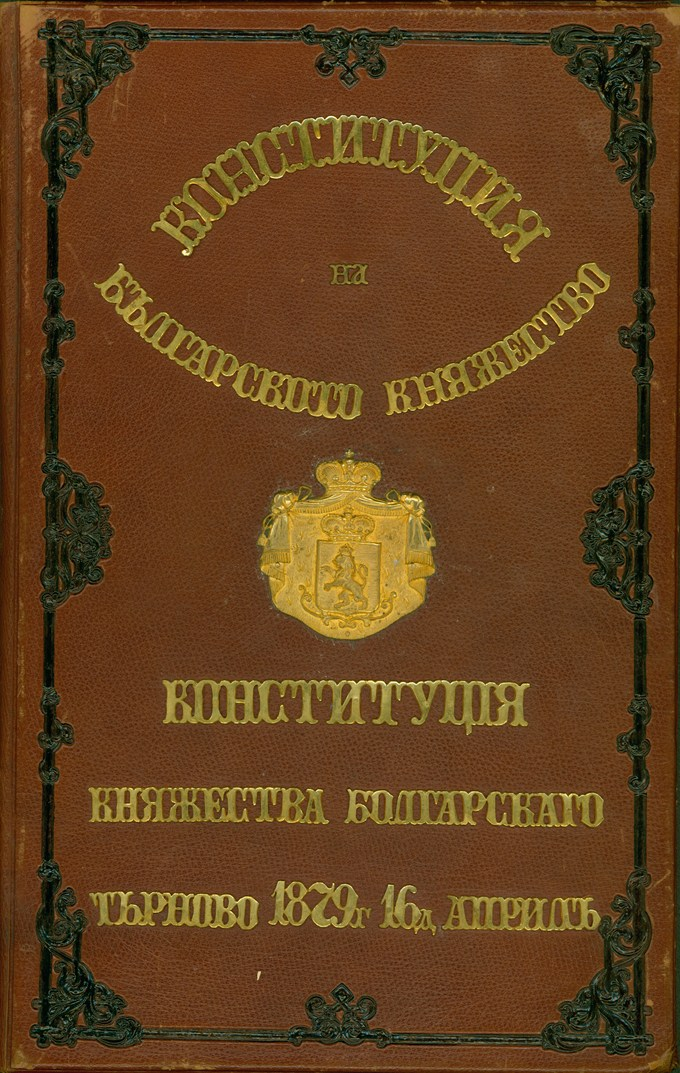
Front cover of the first Bulgarian Tarnovo Constitution from 1879 with early version of the coat of arms on it.

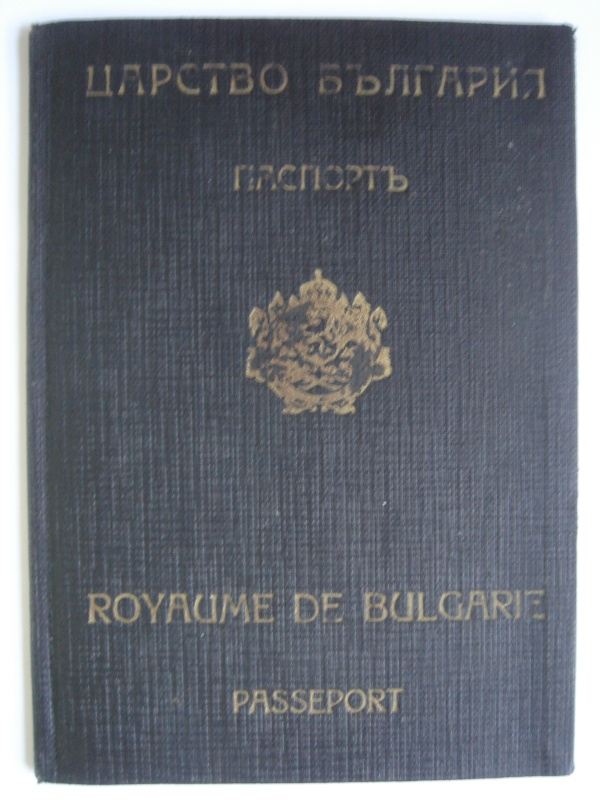
Passport of the Kingdom of Bulgaria with version of the coat of arms from the period 1927–1946 on it, c. 1944.

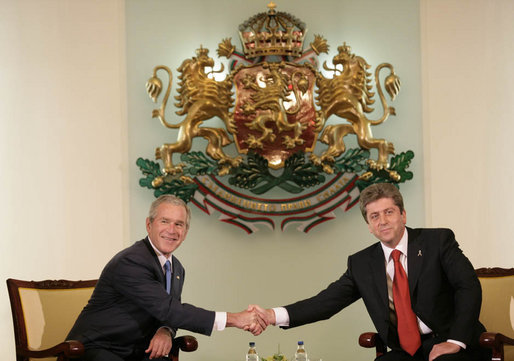
President of Bulgaria Georgi Parvanov and President of the United States George W. Bush in front of the coat of arms in Sofia, June 11, 2007.

Lion imagery has been used by the Bulgarian state at least since the Chatalar Inscription inscribed in 815–834 AD by Khan Omurtag, which mentions two lion sculptures being erected on top of columns in the Palace of Omurtag. The earliest example of a lion's image as the heraldic symbol of Bulgaria is documented in the Lord Marshal's Roll, composed around 1294 AD and preserved in a copy from about 1640. In its first part under №15 is represented the coat of arms of Le Rey de Bugrie or the King of Bulgaria, most probably this of Tsar Smilets (1292–1298) or may be some of his recent predecessors. It consists of an argent lion rampant with golden crown over sable shield. In the end of 14th century an anonymous Arab traveller, who visited the capital of the Second Bulgarian Empire Tarnovo, saw and depicted three lions guardant passant gules painted on the round golden shields carried by the personal guards of Tsar Ivan Shishman (1371–1395). His manuscript is now kept in the National Library of Morocco.

After 1396, when all Bulgarian lands were subjugated by the Ottoman Empire but the Bulgarian crown was not given to the Ottoman dynasty formally, the latter Bulgarian heraldic type as a sign of symbolically independent state was preserved in several European and Balkan collections of coats of arms. Gradually, new and in some cases quite different versions appeared, but the lion remained the most widespread heraldic symbol of Bulgaria and its rulers. In the Illyrian collection of Korenich-Neorich from 1595 the three walking lions, usual for some earlier Western Europe's collections, were replaced by one red lion rampant over golden crowned shield. In the beginning of the 18th century the Croatian heraldist Pavao Ritter Vitezović in two editions of his heraldic collection from 1701 and 1702 reversed the colours of this type and thus the lion became golden and the shield dark red.

This variant was adopted by the famous painter Hristofor Zhefarovich in his Stemmatographia, printed in 1741. His version became the most influential among Bulgarian intellectuals and revolutionaries in the period of the national awakening of Bulgaria, when the lion was considered and widely used as a major national symbol. After the liberational Russo-Turkish War (1877–1878) the coat of arms of Zhefarovich was laid in the base of the new state coat of arms, described in the Tarnovo Constitution of 1879 as follows:

Art. 21. The Bulgarian state coat of arms is a golden crowned lion on a dark red field. Above the field a princely coronet.

The type and the details regarding the state coat of arms were not described clearly and were not standardized by a special Act. Because of this, for several decades they took different forms: lesser form; lesser form without supporters, compartment and motto, but covered with mantle from 1879 to 1880; greater form with supporters, bearing two national flags, compartment, motto and mantle from 1881 to 1927; middle form with supporters, compartment and motto from 1915 until 1918/20. Besides these there were different variations within these types. This perplexed situation was resolved by a special parliamentary commission, which sat after 1923. In 1927 it legitimated the middle form of the coat of arms, similar to these used as personal coats of arms by Bulgarian monarchs Ferdinand I and his son Tsar Boris III (1918–1943), but excluding all dynastic elements and preserving only the pure state symbolism.

Following 1944, new times began for the Bulgarian heraldry. In the communist era, the traditional type of coat of arms was replaced by an emblem which preserved the golden lion rampant placed over an oval azure field, but encircled by the ears of wheat, folded by banners, a gear-wheel, a five-pointed red star and some other elements. This composition was derived principally from the pattern of the emblem of the Soviet Union. After the breakdown of the Bulgarian socialist republic in 1989 and several years of fierce partisan disputes, the traditional middle coat of arms from the period 1927–1946 was restored in 1991 with some minor changes.

The crown on top of the shield, and thus upon the shielded lion, according to the Coat of Arms of the Republic of Bulgaria Act, is supposed to be not that of the last Bulgarian monarchy (1879–1946), but that of the Second Bulgarian Empire (1185–1396). This empire was established by the brothers Peter and Asen, after it was freed from Byzantine control in the end of the 12th century, and it was subjugated by the Ottomans in the very end of the 14th century. In fact it significantly differs from the crowns known from medieval portraits such as these from the Tetraevangelia of Tsar Ivan Alexander (1331–1371).

== Historical coats of arms ==
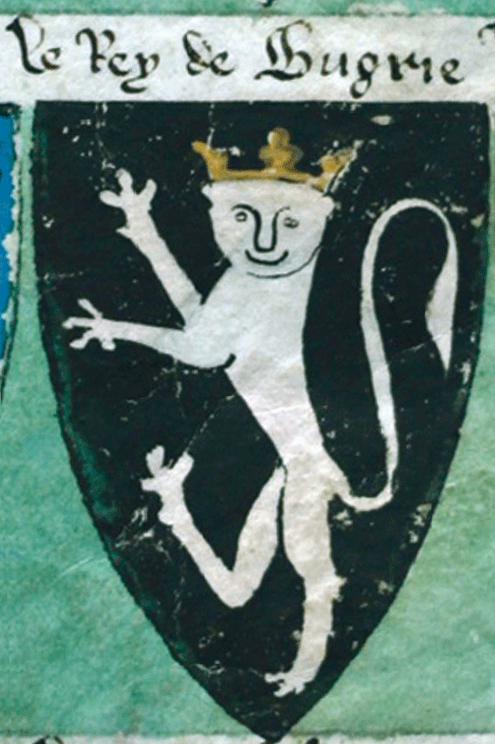
Coat of arms of the King of Bulgaria ca 1295 from the Lord Marshal's Roll.

Shield of a royal warrior from the end of 14th century, anonymous Arabic traveler.

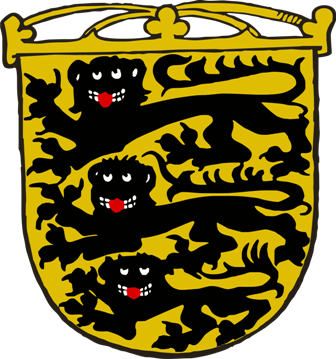
Coat of arms of the Emperor of Bulgaria, Armorial by Conrad Grünenberg, Konstanz Codex, 1483

Coat of arms of Bulgaria from the Fojnica Armorial, from 17th century.

Coat of arms of Bulgaria, from a map by Vincenzo Coronelli, 1692

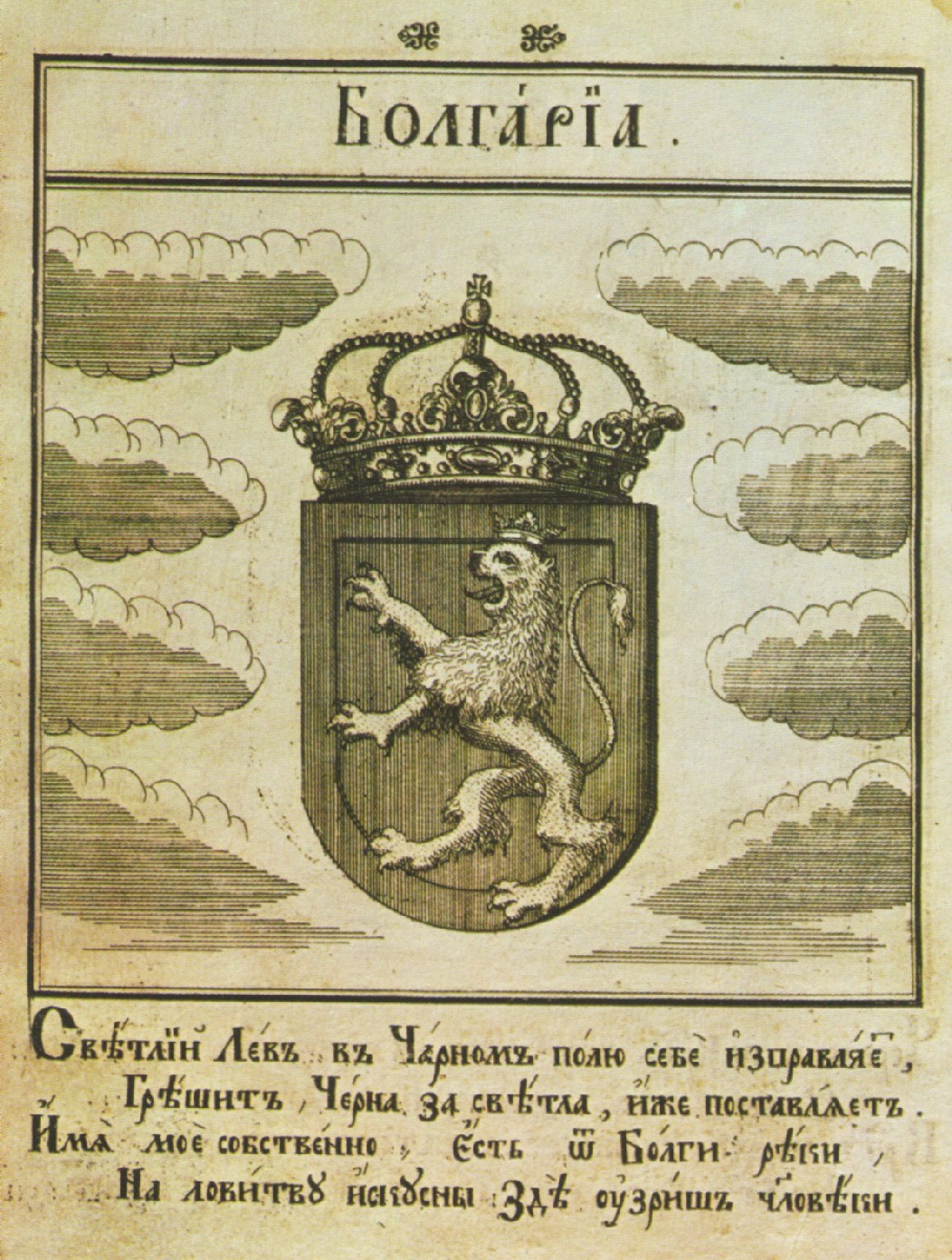
Coat of arms of Bulgaria from Stemmatographia by Hristofor Zhefarovich, 1746

Coat of arms of Bulgaria (1879–1880)

Coat of arms of Bulgaria (1881–1927)

Coat of arms of Bulgaria (1927–1946)

Coat of arms of the People's Republic of Bulgaria (1946–1947)

Coat of arms of the People's Republic of Bulgaria (1947–1948)

Coat of arms of the People's Republic of Bulgaria (1948–1968)

Coat of arms of the People's Republic of Bulgaria (1968–1971)

Coat of arms of the People's Republic of Bulgaria (1971–1990)

Coat of arms of the Republic of Bulgaria (1990–1991)

== See also ==
- Flag of Bulgaria
- Emblem of the People's Republic of Bulgaria
- Mila Rodino
- National Guards Unit of Bulgaria
