= Mojsije Rašković =

Serbian writer and orator

- Born: c. 1750
- Died: 1773
- Occupations: Intellectual, writer
- Known for: Neo-Latin rhetoric, early secular thought in Serbian culture

Mojsije Rašković (c. 1750 – 1773) was a Serbian intellectual and Neo-Latin rhetorician of the 18th century, known for early expressions of secularism in Serbian culture and for his mastery of Ciceronian Latin style.

== Biography ==
Rašković was likely born around 1750 (exact date unknown). He studied at the Lyceum in Bratislava (then Pozsony), where in 1768 he delivered a Latin farewell oration titled Oratio quam Musis valedicens Posoniensibus ... habuit Moses Rascovitsch. The oration was printed that same year and received favorable attention in Leipzig academic circles. Rašković died prematurely in 1773.

== Intellectual contributions ==
=== Rhetoric and style ===
Rašković's oration is regarded an example of Neo-Latin Ciceronian oration. It combines classical-humanist motifs (litterae, studia, Musae) with reflections on the social role of education. He used well-known rhetorical topoi such as monumentum / memoria litterarum and exempla / praecepta virtutis, framing literature as a utilitarian vehicle for moral and intellectual improvement. In doing so, he repeated the humanist slogan litterarum lumen (“the light of letters”) from Cicero's Pro Archia, emphasizing the civilizing function of education.

=== Secularism and critique ===
Rašković's most frequently cited statement asserts that books donated to monasteries “gather dust” and “are sullied by flies,” one of the earliest expressions of a secular outlook in Serbian letters. In the dedication of his 1768 oration to Metropolitan Pavle Nenadović of Karlovci, he reproached the ecclesiastical leader for encouraging education but failing to support secular Serbian literature. Through this act, Rašković sought to direct Serbian cultural life toward higher secular and literary standards, following the example of Roman engagement with Greek learning.

== See also ==
- Pavle Nenadović
