= Georgijević =

Georgijević is a surname. Notable people with the surname include:

- Dejan Georgijević (born 1994), Serbian footballer
- Gerasim Georgijević (fl. 1791–d. 1804), Serbian abbot
- Jovan Georgijević (c. 1710–1773), Serbian Eastern Orthodox leader
- Luka Milovanov Georgijević (1784–1828), Serbian writer and philologist
