= 9 September 1944 (disambiguation) =

9 September 1944 is a date.

9 September 1944 may also refer to:

- 1944 Bulgarian coup d'état, which occurred on 9 September 1944
- Order of 9 September 1944, a Bulgarian order awarded from 1945 to 1990

== See also ==
- "9 IX 1944", the motto on the emblem of the People's Republic of Bulgaria from 1947 to 1971
