= Pavle Nenadović =

Serbian Metropolitan

Metropolitan of Karlovci Pavle Nenadović
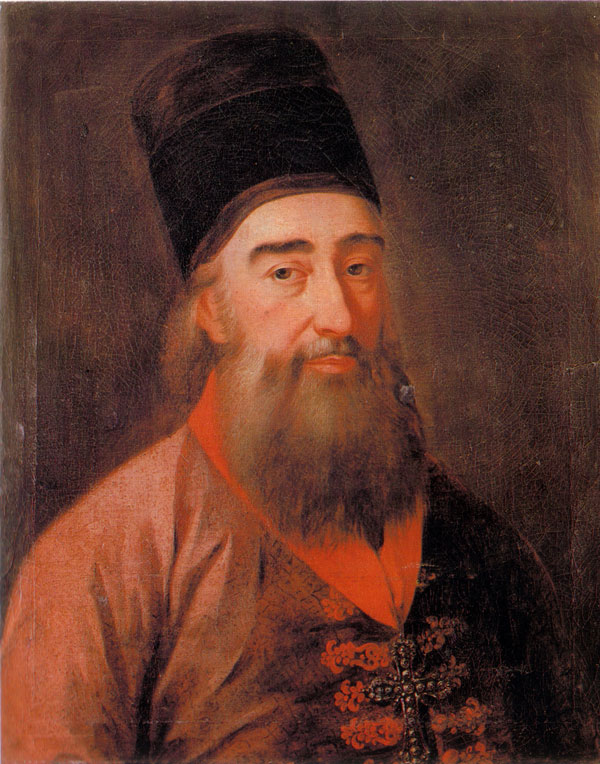
- Oil painting by Teodor Kračun.
- Church: Serbian Orthodox Church
- Province: Military Frontier, Austrian Empire
- Metropolis: Sremski Karlovci
- Installed: 1749
- Term ended: 1768
- Predecessor: Isaija II
- Successor: Jovan Đorđević

Personal details
- Born: 14 January 1703 Budim, Habsburg monarchy (modern Hungary)
- Died: 15 August 1768 (aged 65) Habsburg monarchy
- Denomination: Eastern Orthodox

Pavle Nenadović (Serbian Cyrillic: Павле Ненадовић, pronounced [pâːʋle nenǎːdoʋit͡ɕ]; 1703–1768) was the Serbian Orthodox Archbishop and Metropolitan of Karlovci from 1749 to 1768.

== Biography ==
Pavle Nenadović was born on 14 January 1703 in Budim, Hungary. At the age of eighteen, he was employed as a clerk in the Budim Magistrates Office. He became a Serbian Orthodox cleric in 1726, after which he took monastic vows in the Rakovac Monastery. In 1737, Serbian Patriarch Arsenije IV appointed Pavle as his general exarch, and in 1742 the patriarch appointed him as the bishop of the Eparchy of upper Karlovac.

Arsenije IV also commissioned Pavle Nenadović, a cleric who was by then well known as a poet, to compose a heraldic handbook, Stemmatographia (meaning "the drawing of ancestry" in Greek). This heraldic album was modelled after a book of the same title on Slavonic heraldic bearings, engraved in 1701 by Croatian poet Pavao Ritter Vitezović (who modelled his Stemmatographia after an older version of Slavic heraldry composed by Mavro Orbini). Arsenije IV's Stemmatographia was perceived by some as an illustrated political programme that was supposed to act both as a verification of the Serbian historical past and as a clear geopolitical statement of the lands belonging to the Serbs in the Balkans. His intention, however, was educational, and for this work he hired three people: Hristofor Žefarović, originally from Dojran, as an artist; German-born Thomas Mesmer as an engraver; and clergyman Pavle Nenadović as a poet.

In 1748, Pavle Nenadović was elected Bishop of Arad, but shortly after the death of metropolitan Isaija Antonović he was chosen to succeed him as new metropolitan of Karlovci in 1749. He worked on the promotion of culture and education of the Serbs in the Habsburg monarchy. A result of his work was a significant increase of interest in science and literature among the Serbs. Metropolitan Pavle fought against the conversion of Serbs in Croatia and Romanians in Transilvania into Uniates. He died on 15 August 1768.

After the suppression of the Serbian Patriarchate of Peć in 1766, his Metropolitanate of Karlovci became an autocephalous Serbian Orthodox Church continuator.

== Works ==
- Orḟodok͡sos omologіę. (Орѳодоѯос омологіѧ.) (1758). Srēmski Karlovt͡si.
- Orḟodok͡sos omologіę. (Орѳодоѯос омологіѧ.) (1763). Vēnēt͡siјa: shtampariјa Dimitriјa Tēodosiјa.

== Legacy ==
He is included in The 100 most prominent Serbs.

== See also ==
- Metropolitanate of Karlovci
- List of heads of the Serbian Orthodox Church

== Sources ==
- Вуковић, Сава (1996). Српски јерарси од деветог до двадесетог века (Serbian Hierarchs from the 9th to the 20th Century). Београд: Евро.

Eastern Orthodox Church titles
Preceded by Isaija II	Metropolitan of Karlovci; 1749–1768	Succeeded by Jovan Đorđević
