= Mateša Antun Kuhačević =

Croatian poet and politician

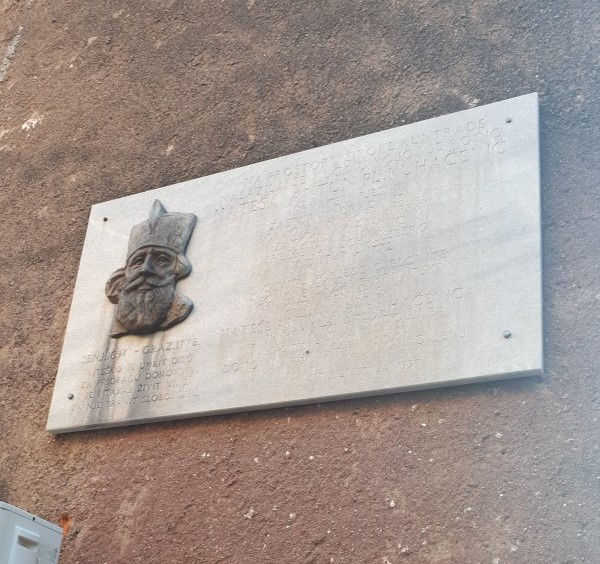
Plaque of Mateša Antun Kuhačević in Senj, designating his place of birth

Mateša Antun Kuhačević (21 November 1697 – 7 September 1772) was a Croatian poet and politician from Senj.

Kuhačević came from the Senj uskok family Kuhačević, which originally emigrated to the town from Bosnia. He was educated in Senj, Rijeka and Graz, after which he enlisted in the army of the Habsburg monarchy. He subsequently participated in the War of the Polish Succession (1733–36) and the War of the Austrian Succession (1742–45) in various capacities. Following the Brinje-Lika revolt of 1746, he was sentenced to life imprisonment due to suspicion of helping to instigate the rebellion. He wrote a text titled Synoptica informatio circa vetus et novum regulamentum generalatus Carlostadiensis, which argued in favor of civil rule in his hometown of Senj. He wrote nearly all of his literary opus during his time in prison, and likely turned to this activity in order to continue influencing policies towards Senj.

His works include six versed epistolaries, five reflexive-religious poems, eight epic poems and lyric-epic hybrids all of which were written in his native Chakavian dialect. Of these, his most notable work is titled Narikovanje staroga Senja vrh mladoga Senja po vili Slovinjkinji, which is a critique of everyday life in Senj. A satire, titled Vile slovinkinje s mladežom jednoga neimenovanoga grada u meritu prot vladiki cich oskvernjene Vire uzdignuta zuluma is also attributed to him. He was influenced both by domestic literature such as Odiljenje sigetsko by Pavao Ritter Vitezović and by war poetry during his stay in Austria.

== Works ==
- Molitva nevoljnika u pržunu nahodećega
- Narikovanje staroga Senja vrh mladoga Senja po vili Slovinjkinji
- Vile slovinkinje s mladežom jednoga neimenovanoga grada u meritu prot vladiki cich oskvernjene Vire uzdignuta zuluma
