= Hristofor Žefarović =

18th-century painter, writer, engraver, and poet

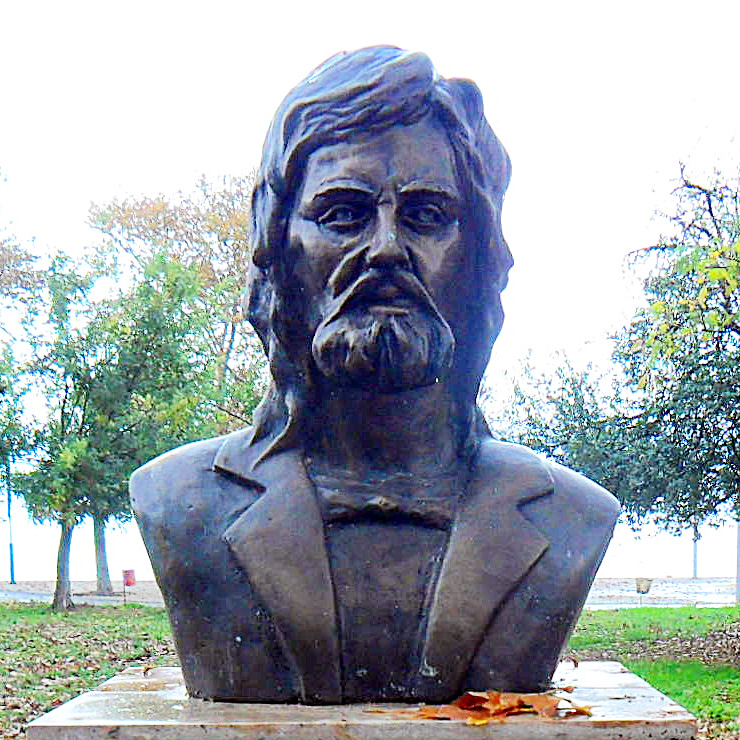
Bust of Hristofor Žefarović in Star Dojran

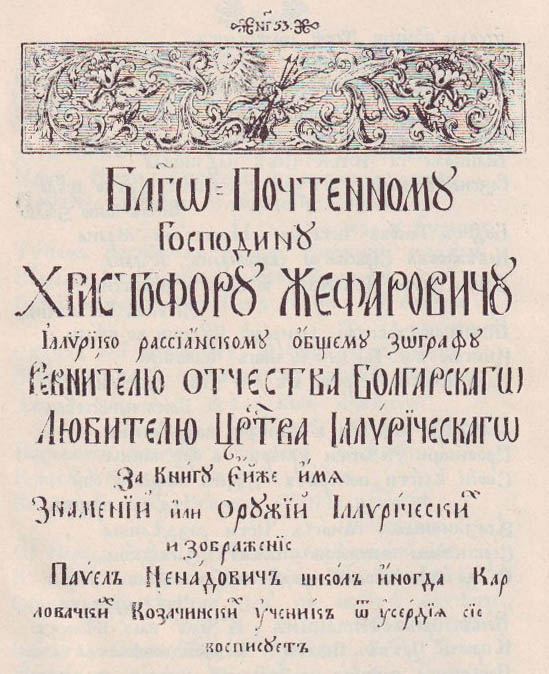
Pavle Nenadović's praise to Hristofor Žefarović in Stemmatographia: "To the well reputable gentleman Hristofor Zhefarovich, Illyro-Rascian universal icon-painter, zealot of Bulgarian fatherland, lover of Illyrian Empire"

Hristofor Žefarović (Bulgarian: Христофор Жефарович, Serbian Cyrillic: Христофор Жефаровић, Hristofor Zhefarovich) was an 18th-century painter, engraver, writer and poet and a notable proponent of early pan-South Slavism.

== Biography ==
Born at the end of the 17th century, Hristofor Žefarović (Old Cyrillic: Христофоръ Жефаровичъ) descended from a priestly family from Dojran in Ottoman Empire, (present-day North Macedonia) and became a monk himself. As a highly educated and well-learned itinerant monk, he painted and traded with books, icons, and church plate. He spent some time in the St. Naum Monastery in Ohrid. His name was first mentioned in 1734 in Belgrade, where he was well known as an artist. His first well-preserved work are the frescoes in the churches of the Bođani Monastery in Bačka, then Habsburg monarchy (today in Serbia) from 1737 and the Siklós Orthodox Monastery from 1739. He was exclusively engaged in copper engraving and book illustration after 1740. he engraved copper plates for his books and printed them in the "etching-typographical workshop" of his collaborator Thomas Mesmer in Vienna. His engraving was of great cultural-historical importance to the Baroque art of the time. His style of 'bright cut' engraving was thoroughly masterly and original, specializing in the higher branches—engraving for printing—of the engraver's art.

Žefarović made a pilgrimage to Jerusalem through Thessaloniki and Jaffa and later established himself in the Epiphany Monastery in Moscow, where he died on 18 September 1753. He was responsible for making the writing genre called proskynetaria popular with descriptions of the holy places and monasteries of Palestine and elsewhere, often giving prayers and devotions associated with each place. Žefarović was the author of two religious works, an instruction to newly appointed priests (Поучение святителское к новопоставленному йерею, Pouchenie svyatitelskoe k novopostavlennomu yereyu) from 1742 and a description of Jerusalem from 1748 (Описание светаго божия града Йерусалима, Opisanie svetago bozhiya grada Ierusalima), the travel book was published by Jerusalem Archimandrite Simeon Simonović at his own expense. Žefarović's name is also associated with two textbooks — a primer and a grammar book, as well as numerous copper gravures of renowned personalities from modern-day Vojvodina.

His work was acknowledged in Europe and he became an honorary member of the Imperial Academy in Vienna and the Royal Academy of Munich.

He died in Moscow on 18 September 1753.

== Stemmatographia ==
Žefarović's work of greatest importance for the South Slavic Revival was his Stemmatographia published in Vienna in 1741. The book was commissioned by the Serbian Orthodox Metropolitan of Karlovci, Arsenije IV Jovanović Šakabenta, who also funded its production. During its composition Žefarović used the Stemmatographia of Croatian Pavao Ritter Vitezović of 1701, who on his part used Kingdom of the Slavs by Mauro Orbini of 1601. Stemmatographia was illustrated by Žefarović with copperplate engravings and black and white drawings. It contains 20 copperplates depicting 28 Serbian and Bulgarian rulers and saints; 15 of them are Serbian princes, princesses, kings, and tsars (mostly of the Nemanjić dynasty), and 7 of them are Serbian archbishops and patriarchs. Stemmatographia also contains 56 coats of arms of South Slavic and other Balkan countries with descriptive quatrains under them, regarded as the first example of modern secular Bulgarian and Serbian poetry. Stemmatographia had a crucial influence on the Bulgarian National Revival and made a great impact on the entire Bulgarian heraldry of the 19th century, when it became most influential among all generations of Bulgarian enlighteners and revolutionaries during the period of national awakening of Bulgaria and shaped the idea for a modern Bulgarian national symbol.

The pattern of Bulgarian coat of arms of Stemmatographia was used as the state symbol of the royal Bulgarian administration in 1878, but set in an ermine mantle and with a prince's crown above it. This coat of arms continued to be used on the state seal and the seals of state institutions well after an official one (also influenced by the one in Stemmatographia) was introduced by the National Assembly. The coat of arms of the short-lived Ottoman province of Eastern Rumelia was also created after the coat of arms of Constantinople (called "coat of arms of Romania") in Žefarović's work.

Žefarović's coat of arms of Bulgaria was depicted on the reverse of the Bulgarian 2 levs banknote, issued in 1999 and 2005.

== Nationality and ethnicity ==
Hristofor Žefarović worked for the spiritual resurgence of the Bulgarian and Serbian people, as he considered them to be one and the same "Illyrian" (South Slavic) people. Pavle Nenadović, exarch of the Serbian Patriarch, had called him "Illyro-Rascian universal painter, zealot of the Bulgarian homeland and kinlover of the Illyrian Empire" ("иллирïко рассïанскому общему зографу, ревнителю отчества Болгарскагѡ и любителю царства Иллѵрïческагѡ"). Žefarović noted "our Serbian motherland" ("отечество сербско наше", otechestvo serbsko nashe) and signed as a "Illyro-Rascian universal painter" ("иллирïко рассïанскïи общïй зографъ", illirïko rassïanskïy obshtïy zograf). In his testament, he explicitly noted that his relatives were "of Bulgarian nationality" ("булгарской нации", bulgarskoy natsii) and from Dojran. The ethnicity of Žefarović has been the subject of some dispute between the Bulgarian and Serbian historiography. Western scholars prefer to emphasize his contributions to the history of both peoples, and maintain that Žefarović belonged to both nations.

== Honours ==
Zhefarovich Crag on Fallières Coast, Antarctica is named after Hristofor Zhefarovich.

== Gallery ==
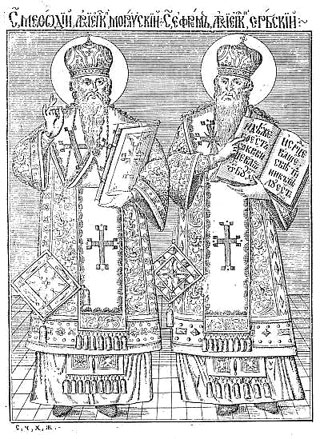
Engraving of Saint Methodius and Saint Jefrem of Serbia

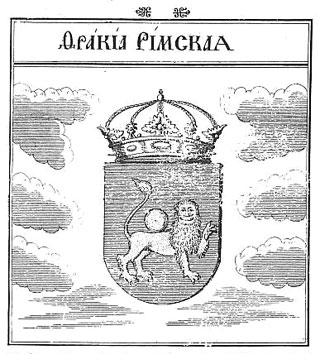
Coat of arms of Roman (i.e. Byzantine) Thrace

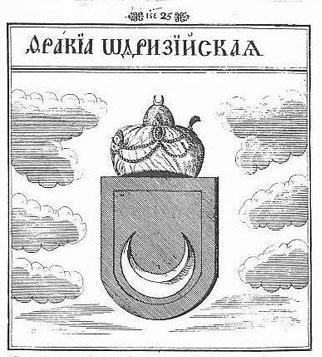
Coat of arms of Ottoman Thrace

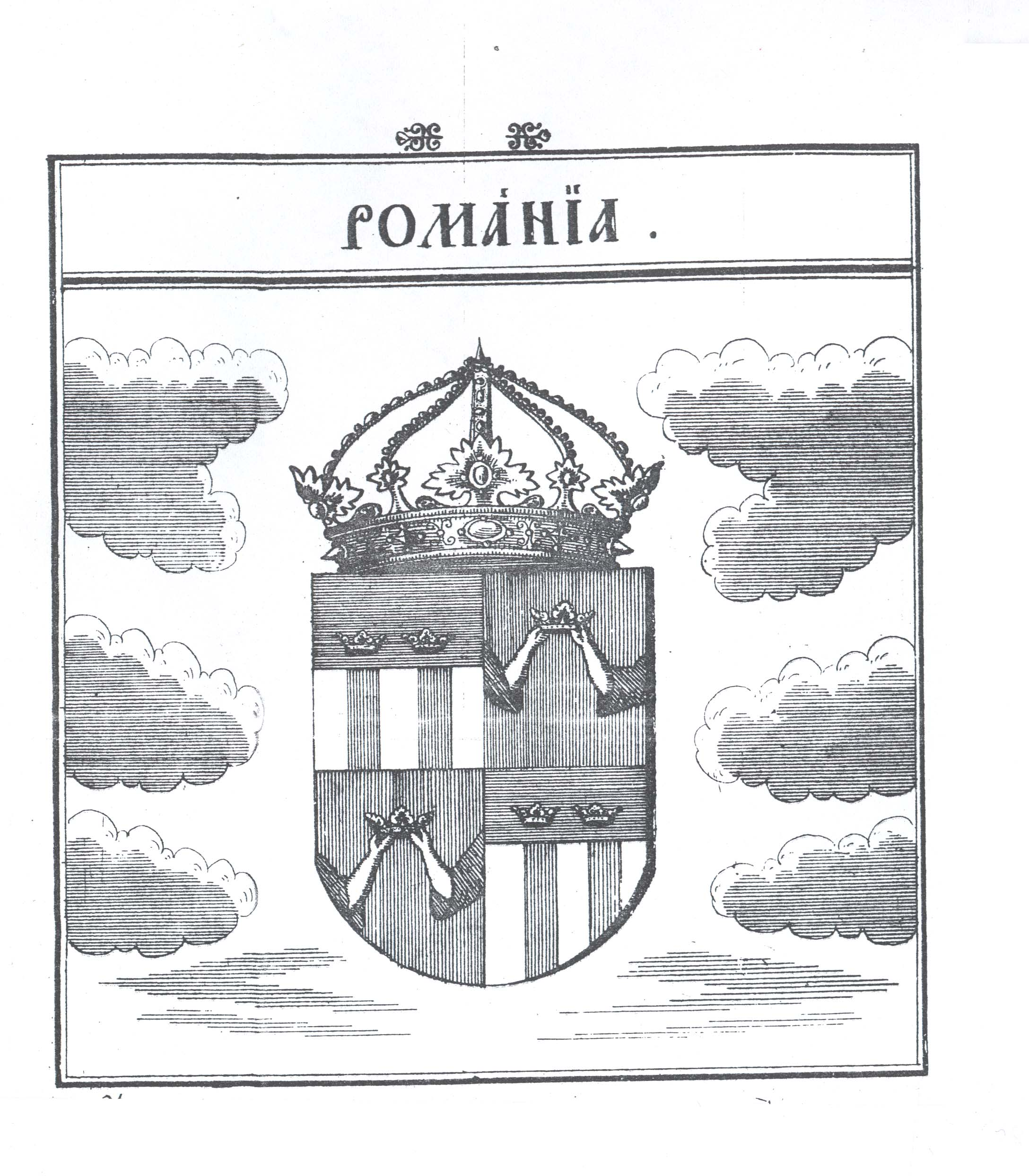
Coat of arms of "Romania", later adopted as the state symbol of Eastern Rumelia

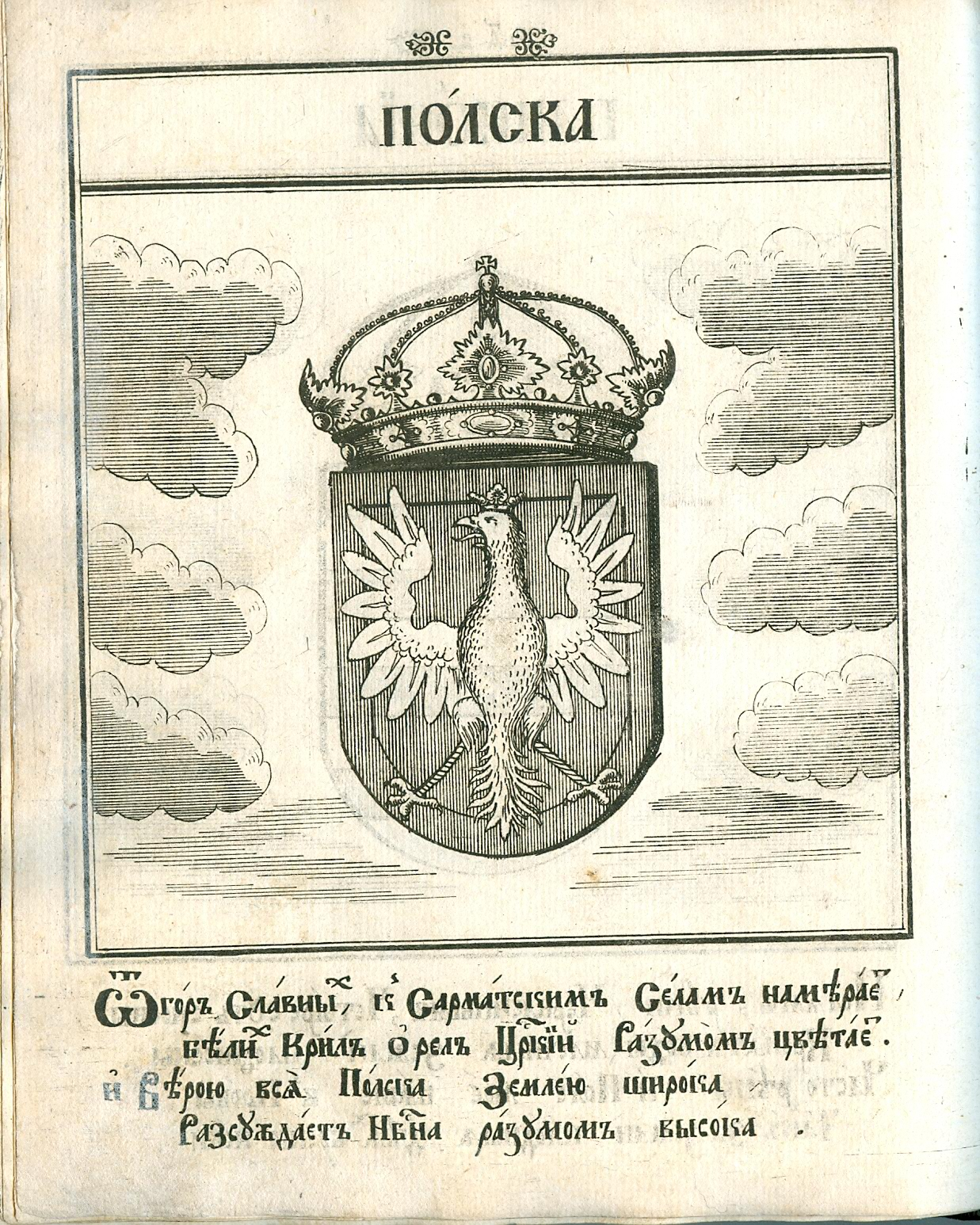
Coat of arms of Poland

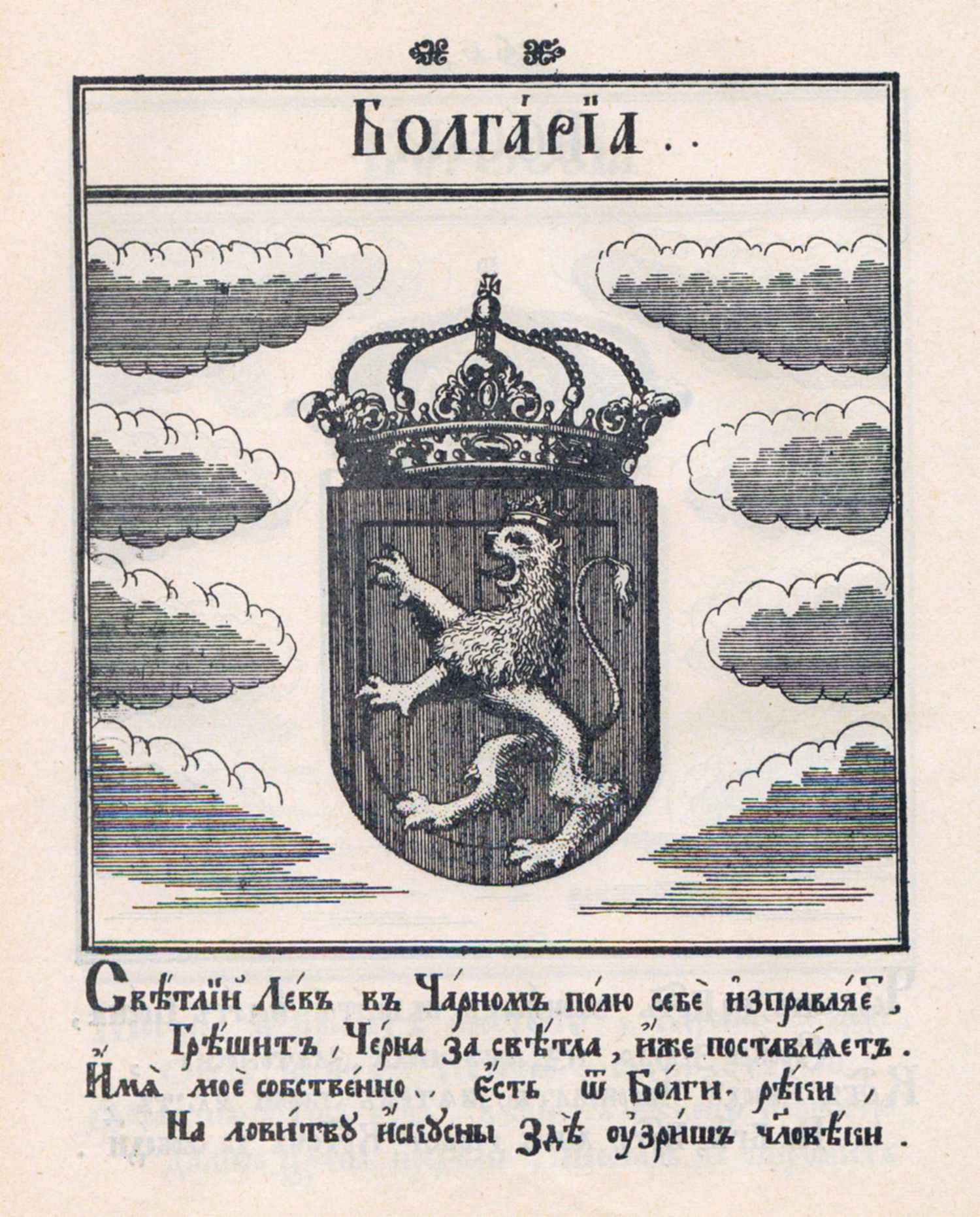
Coat of arms of Bulgaria

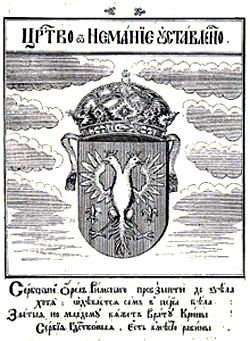
Coat of arms of the Serbian House of Nemanjić

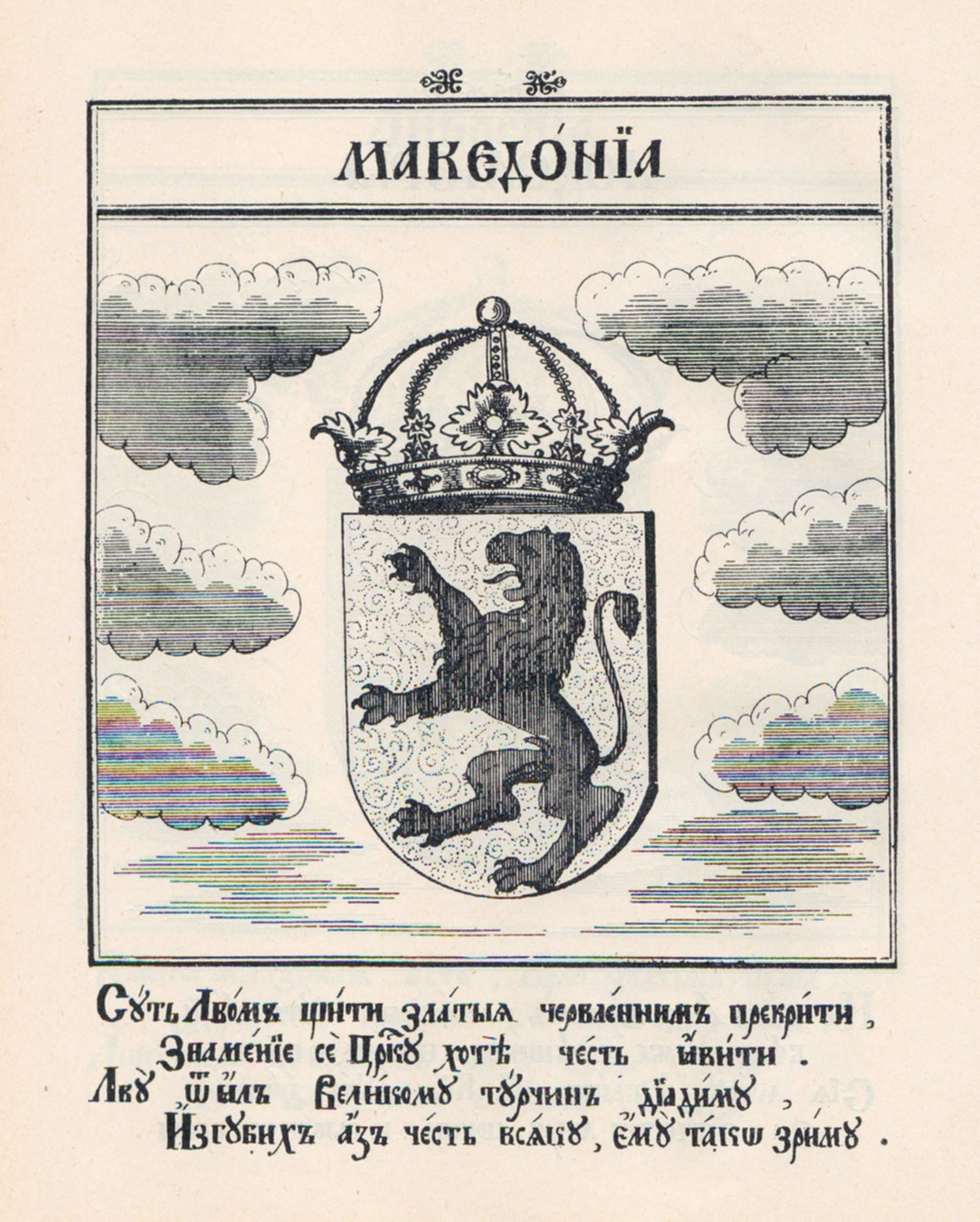
Coat of arms of Macedonia

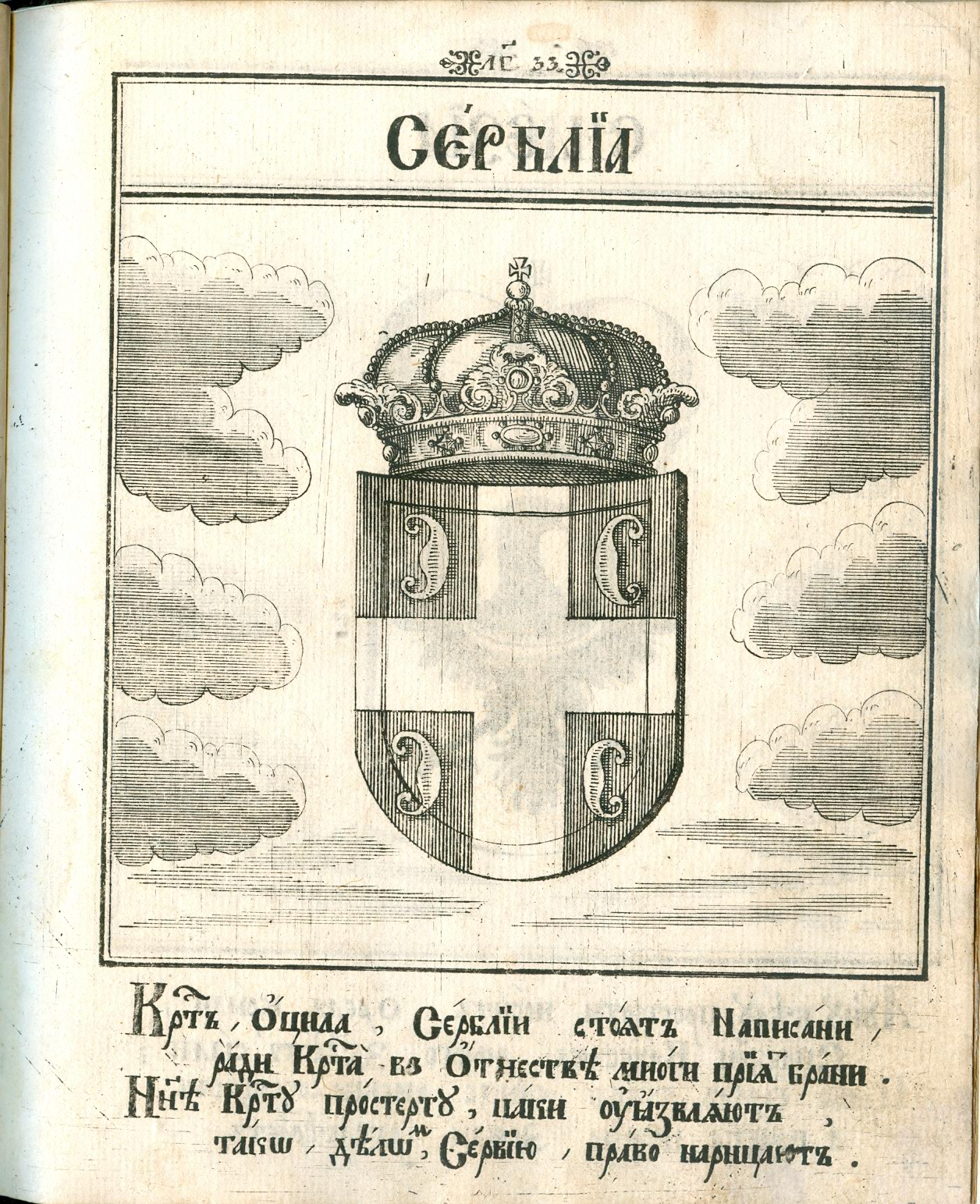
Coat of arms of Serbia

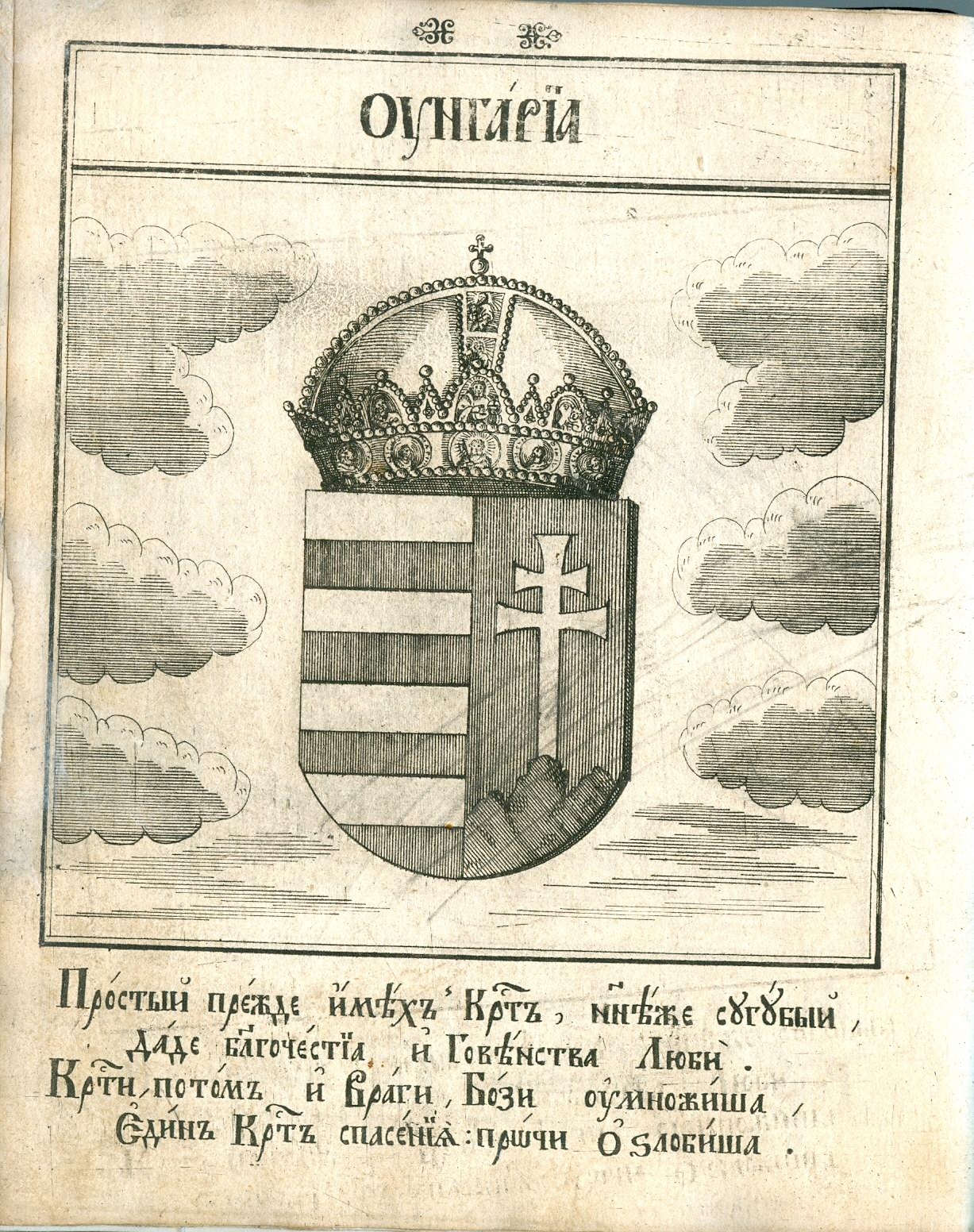
Coat of arms of Hungary

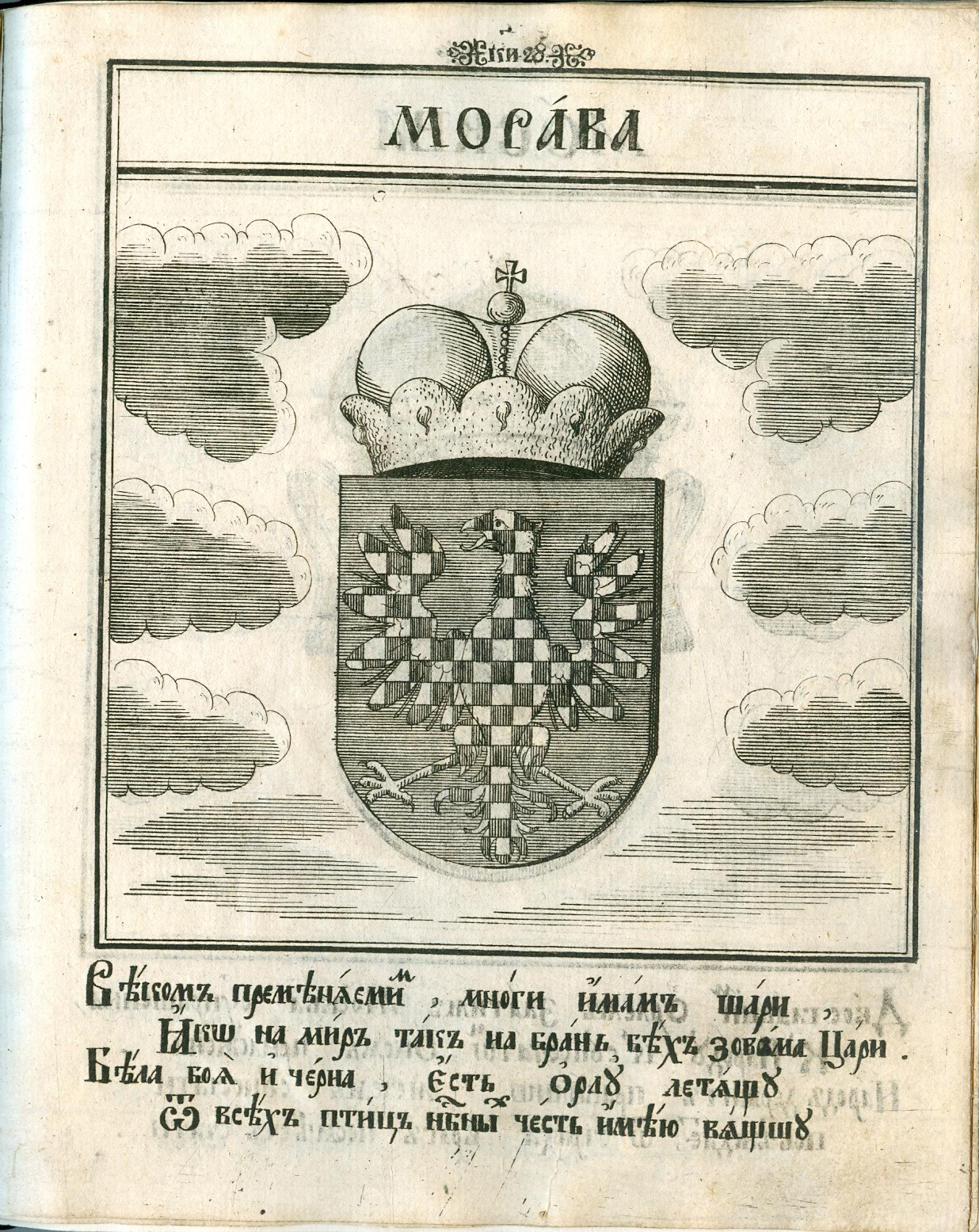
Coat of arms of Moravia

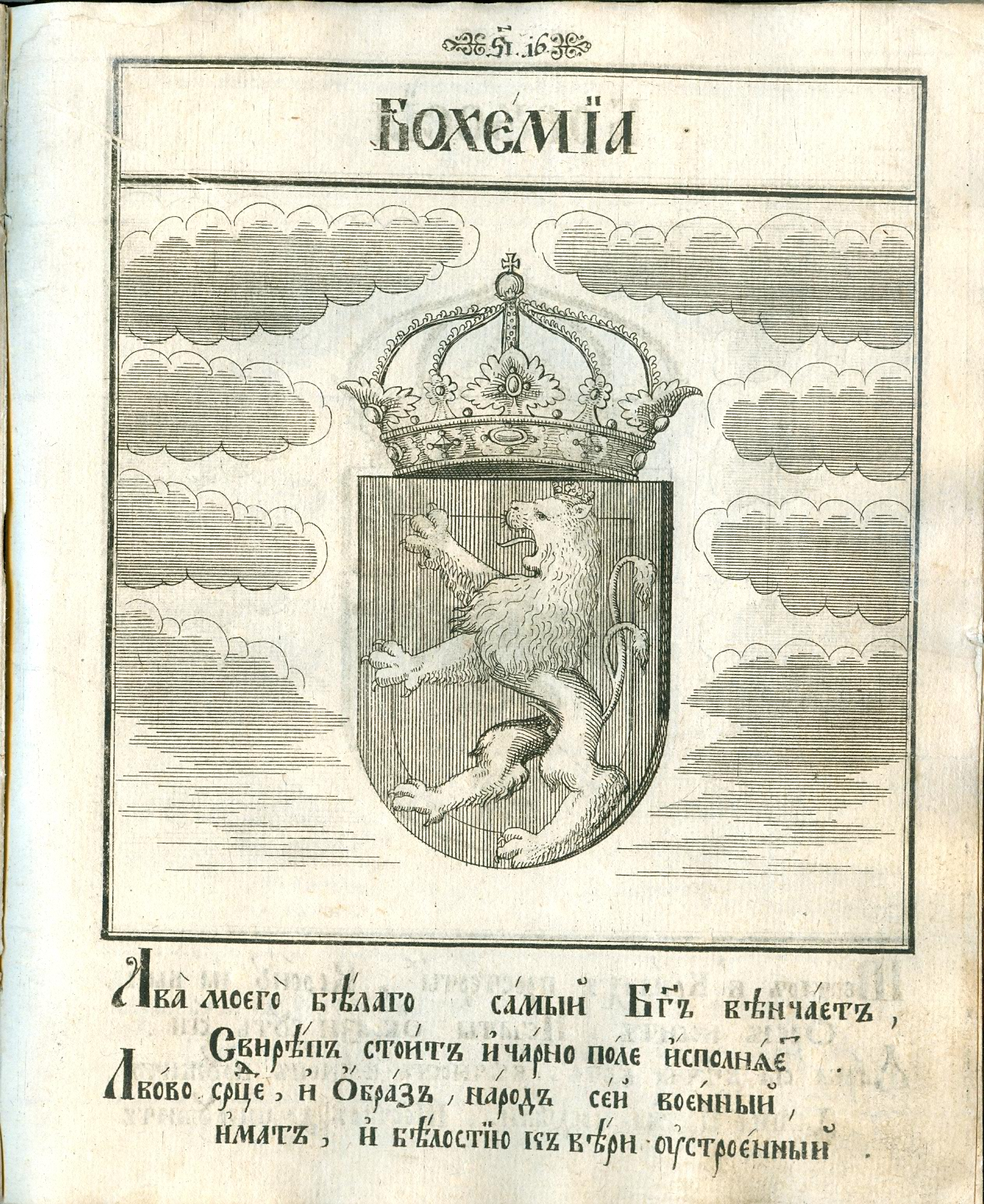
Coat of arms of Bohemia

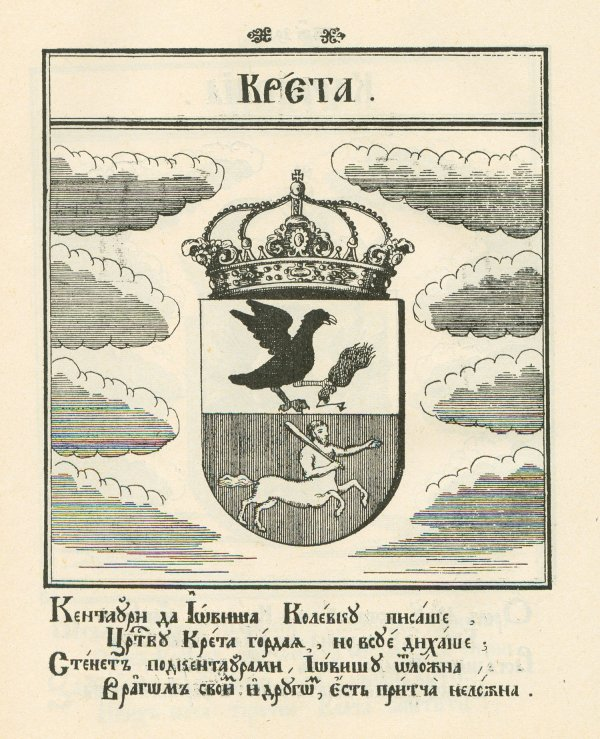
Coat of Arms Crete
