= Plorantis Croatiae saecula duo =

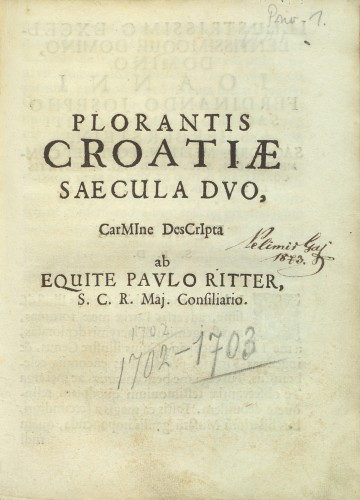
Title page of the 1703 edition

Plorantis Croatiae saecula duo (English: "Two centuries of Croatia in mourning") is a poetical work by Pavao Ritter Vitezović, published in 1703 in Zagreb. As with many of Vitezović's works, it is written in Latin. The unusual structure of the work makes it difficult to classify, being variously described as a poeticized chronicle, historical epic, pseudo-autobiography, or allegory. Containing nearly 2000 lines of verse, the poem recounts the previous two hundred years of Ottoman Wars being narrated in first person by a personified Croatia, who is presented as an allegory to the Catholic topos of the weeping mother (Stabat Mater). These events, including wars, plagues, famines, are given as a history of personal suffering to the personification, containing detailed psychosomatic elements. It is dedicated to the Austrian field marshal Johann Ferdinand Josef Herberstein.

== Reception ==
On the last three pages, Vitezović included three poems written by the Zagreb canons Petar Črnković, Franjo Josip Vernić and Franjo Kralj. These were written in honor of Vitezović and represent a valuable insight into contemporary reception of his work. They praise Vitezović as an equal to Virgil.

Zrinka Blažević of the University of Zagreb praised his work Two Centuries of Croatia in Mourning as among the best Croatian poetical works in Latin, containing great aesthetic qualities and an unusual narrative structure.
