= Croatia Rediviva =

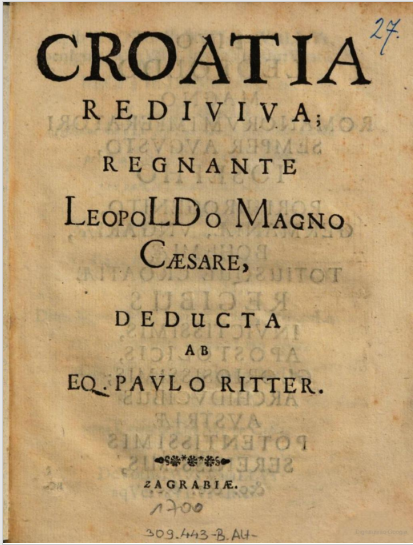
- Croatia Rediviva, 1700
- Author: Pavao Ritter Vitezović
- Original title: Croatia Rediviva; Regnante LeopoLDo Magno Cæsare
- Language: Latin language
- Genre: Historiography, Onomastics, Political manifesto, Poetry
- Publication date: 1700
- Publication place: Habsburg monarchy

Croatia Rediviva (translated as Revived Croatia, or Croatia Reborn) is a work by Pavao Ritter Vitezović published in 1700. Although the main intent of Vitezović was to prove that the borders of Croatia (back then part of the Habsburg monarchy) were originally considerably larger, it grew into a political program based on a separate pan-South Slavic identity, related to the rebirth of the Croatian national idea, called the Illyrian movement. It is Vitezović's best known historiographical work, which had an immense influence on the later Illyrian movement.

== Background ==
Following the 1699 treaty of Karlowitz, a commission was set up under the leadership of Luigi Ferdinando Marsili and meant to establish the borders between the Ottoman Empire and the territories of the Habsburg Monarchy. Pavao Ritter Vitezović became part of this commission in various roles to play, which subsequently was the main cause and inspiration for writing this work. Its precursor was a memorandum Vitezović presented to Marsili, as a protest to this treaty.

=== Publication history ===
The work was published by Vitezović in Zagreb, and there are currently only three copies preserved. One originated from the inheritance of Marsili at Bologna, and others are kept in the Croatian State Archives.

== Description ==
The work is actually a brochure numbering only 32 pages. It was intended as a draft for a much larger work, which the author never managed to realize.

It begins with a dedication to Emperor Leopold, naming him, among others, "king of all Croatia", as a reflection of political ambitions outlined in this book. This is followed by an introductory in verse Monitio ad Prodromum, where goals and ideas of the work are laid out. In the same poem consisting of 9 couplets, he encourages the reader to send him more material such as sources and coats of arms. The whole introductory part is meticulously structured, thoroughly stylized (demonstrating Vitezović abilities as a printer), and ornamented with rhetorical devices such as puns, litotes, homeoteleuton, etc.

In Croatia Rediviva, Vitezović sets out to first establish the origin of the Croat name (ethnogenesis), and then the extent of boundaries of Croatia, trying to reconcile contradictions in various sources ranging from chronicles such as Chronicle of the Priest of Duklja to historians Mavro Orbini and Johannes Lucius. Using White Croatia, White Croats and the legend of Lech, Czech and Rus as basis, Vitezović declared all Western and Eastern Slavs as Croats. The second part is a polemic against those who view Croats as different to Slavs and Illyrians. He maintains Slavs and Croats are synonyms, holding the term "Illyrian" as merely a Greek and Latin name for Slavs. By denouncing Lucius as a Venetian apologist, he negates Venetian claim to Dalmatia.

Finishing the book with the newly attained belief that all Slavs held the Croat name, he views all the Slavic lands as being divided in two main parts: Northern Croatia (Croatia Septemtrionalis, which included Hungary) and Southern Croatia (Croatia Meridionalis), the latter being further divided into Red Croatia and White Croatia.

White Croatia he divided in four regions:

- Maritime Croatia
- Mediterranean Croatia
- Mesopotamian Croatia
- Alpine Croatia

These newly coined terms corresponded to actual region of Dalmatia, Slavonia, Noricum, whereas Red Croatia consisted of Serbia, Macedonia, Bulgaria and Odryssia.

== Interpretations and influence ==
According to historian Ivo Banac, Vitezović treated his "pan-Croatianism" both as a historical construct and as a political programme, originating as an outrage against the centuries-long fragmentation of Croatian lands and the whole Slavic south. The work is also a polemic against Venetian territorial pretensions and in favor of legitimising Habsburg expansionism. However, Vitezović did not treat his Greater Croatia as a unified whole, acknowledging different customs, names and emblems of territories included. Although he maintained, these were not important for the common nationhood and lineage of the Croats. Banac also argued against treating this work as a case of national exclusivism, stating that this work also influenced the national movement of the Serbs and Bulgarians. Ferdo Šišić once regarded the work as a "Bible of Croat national policy in the 19th century", inspiring such individuals as Ljudevit Gaj, Eugen Kvaternik and Ante Starčević. Vitezović anticipated the Romanticist movement with his treatment of "nationhood". As was common for nationalist writers of that period, he speculated on the origins his people, drawing on a variety of historical sources. His work is in some ways a precursor to modern nationalist ideology. He manipulated and misrepresented sources, perhaps deliberately, in order to support his own political intention in the book.
