= Juraj Malevac =

Croatian poet, writer and priest

Juraj Malevac or Maljevac, writing under pseudonym Gregur Kapucin (Slovene: Jurij Malevec; 2 March 1734 – 20 January 1812), Croatian poet, writer and priest.

== Biography ==
He was born on 2 March 1734 in Perudina, which was a part of the Duchy of Carniola (today in Slovenia). Since 1755, he had been a member of the Capuchin Order, and was educated in Zagreb, where he was subsequently ordained and spent much of his life and career. He wrote poetic works of secular and religious themes in the Kajkavian dialect (with elements of Chakavian) of Croatian, often occasional in nature. He was influenced both by medieval religious, and contemporary secular enlightenment literature with Baroque elements. At first, he mostly wrote occasional poetry such as those written for Ivan Krstitelj Paxy (1771) and Maksimilijan Vrhovac (1788), when they were named Bishops of Zagreb and Ivan Nepomuk II Erdődy, when he was named Ban of Croatia (1790). A number of other publications, published anonymously in Zagreb, are ascribed to him such as Dar za novo leto (1784), two poems for soldiers (published 1787 and 1789), and a poem written during the occasion of the priest's jubilee (1787).

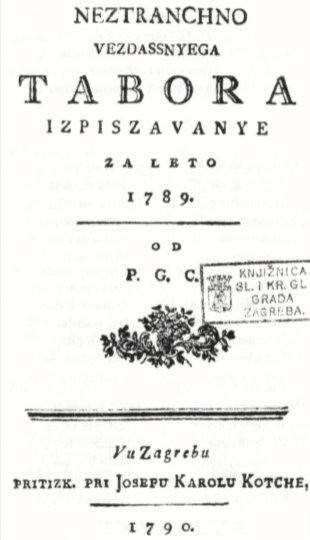
Cover of second issue of Nestrančno vezdašnjega tabora izpisavanje (1790), popularly known as Epic trillogy

His first major work Nestrančno vezdašnjega tabora izpisavanje (1789, 1790 and 1791), an epic poem in three parts dealing with the Austro-Turkish War (1788–1791), which was based on information provided by the Imperial Court's newspaper in Vienna. The poem uses a simple style with elements borrowed from folk and Andrija Kačić Miošić poetry, with the main influence being Pavao Ritter Vitezović and German war poetry. The work was consequently described by August Šenoa as a "newspaper in verse", in which it depicts the Ottomans in ironic and satirical fashion. This was followed by a biblical-allegoric epyllion titled Nebeski pastir pogubljenu ovcu išče (1795), in which Malevac covered the Parable of the Lost Sheep, drawing from earlier sources. Another work depicting the birth of Christ, Horvacka od Kristuševoga narođenja vitija (1800, Zagreb), is difficult to categorize, but is described by some critics as Malevac's aesthetically best work, on grounds that it is written in a particularly humorous and original way.

From 1770, he published the folk calendar Novi kalendar (a type of periodical publication similar to a magazine) in which he served as main editor (1801-1811) and to which anonymously contributed a number of literary texts and poems, among which the most notable is the anti-revolutionary poem Horvat Horvatom horvatski govori (A Croatian Speaks Croatian to a Croatian, 1801). He died in Varaždin on 20 January 1812.

== Works ==
- 1768. Cabala to je na vszakoiachka pitanya kratki ter vendar prikladni odgovori vu horvaczkom jeziku na szvetlo dani od Ruga Raga Kaga Racze Den Turszki Pop ChtaVCzeM IsztInszko aLDVVanI. Vu Zagrebu: Naidesze pri posteexpeditoru Ivanu Vretscheru.
- 1771. Applausus excellentissimo illustrissimo ac reverendissimo domino domino Ioanni Baptistae Paxi, dono Dei et Apostolicae Sedis gratia episcopo Zagrabiensi […] pro festiva sacrae inaugurationis die oblatus a Zagrabiensi pp. Capucinorum conventu. Zagrabiae: Typis Antonii Jandera.
- 1781. Trojverztna Marie Theresie, rimzke czeszaricze y apostolzke kralyicze, krepozt vu vremenu mertvechkoga obszlusavanya tak od szlavne varmegyie kak od plemenitoga magistratussa : dan 16. meszecza proszincza leto 1781. Vu Zagrebu: Pritizkana po Josefu Karolu Kotsche.
- 1789. Neztranchno vezdassnyega tabora izpiszavanye. Vu Zagrebu: Pritizk. pri Josefu Karolu Kotche.
- 1790. Naizvisseneissi Johan Erdodii na viszokv banalzkv chazt po Leopoldv izvissen. Vu Zagrebu: Pritizkano po Josefu Karolu Kotsche.
- 1793. Duhovni kalendar iz pobosne knisicze Tomassa od Kempis vzet 1793. V-Zagrebu: Pri Trattnern.
- 1795. Nebeszki pasztir pogublyenu ovczu ische. Vu Optuju: Pri Ferenczu Shüczu.
- 1800. Horvaczka od Kristussevoga narodyenya vittia. Vu Zagrebu: Novoszelzkimi szlovotizki.
