= Emblem of the People's Republic of Bulgaria =

Official government symbol of Bulgaria from 1946 to 1990

Emblem of Bulgaria Емблема на Народна Република България
- Armiger: People's Republic of Bulgaria
- Adopted: 1948
- Crest: Red star
- Shield: Bleu Celeste, a lion argent
- Supporters: Stalks of wheat
- Compartment: Cogwheel
- Motto: 681/1944
- Use: 1971-1990

The Emblem of the People's Republic of Bulgaria (Bulgarian: Емблема на Народна Република България) was first used from 1946 until the end of communist rule in 1990. Following the communist September 9, 1944 coup d'état, the insurgents used royal flags defaced by cutting out the crown and the royal cyphers. Around the arms was a garland of branches of oak and olive. On 15 September 1946, the People's Republic was proclaimed. On 6 December 1947 an emblem patterned after the State Emblem of the Soviet Union was adopted which consisted of a red five-pointed star with eight ears of wheat or tied with a red ribbon inscribed with the motto 9 IX 1944.

In 1948, the ribbon was changed to the colors of the flag of Bulgaria. In 1967, the design of the emblem was changed slightly, with the white wheat replacing the gold. The most recent version of the emblem was used from 1971 with the motto changed to 681/1944, with 681 indicating the year of the establishment of the First Bulgarian Empire by Asparuh.

A new coat of arms of Bulgaria was adopted in 1997 and replaced the Emblem of the People's Republic.

== Gallery ==
1946–1947

1947–1948

1948–1967

1967–1971

1971–1990

== See also ==
- Coat of arms of Bulgaria
