= Scourge of God =

Scourge of God may refer to:

- Divine retribution, divine punishment
- Attila (fl. c. 406–453), Hunnic king
- Slavic migrations to the Balkans, the Slavic settlement of the Balkans during 6th–7th centuries
- Genghis Khan (c. 1162–1227), Mongol khan
- Black Death, an Afro-Eurasian bubonic plague pandemic during 1346–1353
- Bohdan Khmelnytsky (c. 1595–1657), Cossack hetman
- The Scourge of God (film), a 1920 Austrian film directed by Michael Curtiz
- Scourge of God (wargame), a 1982 wargame published by Simulations Canada
- The Scourge of God (novel), a 2008 novel by S. M. Stirling
