= Stemmatographia (1701) =

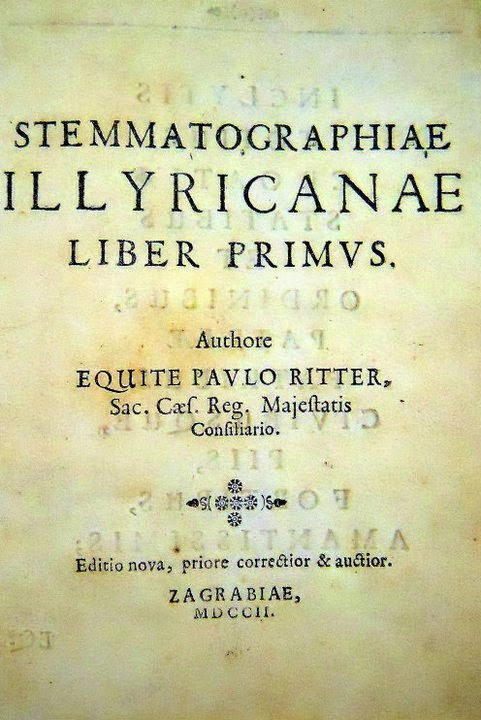
- Cover of the 2nd edition, 1702.
- Author: Pavao Ritter Vitezović
- Original title: Stemmatografia sive Armorum Illiricorum delineatio, descriptio et restitutio
- Language: Latin language
- Genre: Heraldry, Prose, Poetry
- Publication date: 1701
- Publication place: Habsburg monarchy

Stemmatographiae Illyricanae, known by its full name Stemmatographia sive Armorum Illyricorum delineatio, descriptio et restitutio ("Stemmatography, or the sketch, description and revival of the Illyrian coats of arms") is a heraldic essay written and illustrated by Pavao Ritter Vitezović, and originally published in 1701.

== Publication history ==
Its first edition was published in 1701, most likely in Vienna, considering the place of printing was never explicitly named. The second edition was published by Vitezović in Zagreb (1702). In the foreword to the second edition he notes that "the first edition was printed and published in many numbers, was sold out and that there exists a great interest, which led to publishing the second edition of the work". It is regarded as among Vitezović's most popular works.

There he also claims that the work is a "testament to his dear homeland, because in the published arms the glow of the homeland radiates", personally hoping that a luckier progeny will embrace "Croatia in all its parts again whole" and "all of Illyricum which will unite with Croatia in love and devotion", demonstrating patriotic and somewhat Romanticist tendencies.

== Description ==
The original work contains a total of 56 coats of arms from various lands drawn by Vitezović, which are arranged alphabetically. Each page of the book contains an engraving of the coat of arms, along with its name in decorative letters and two Latin couplets describing or interpreting the coat of arms. The featured territories range from Muscovy, to Poland, Austria, Illyria, Albania and Turkey. The book contains both historical, fictional and contemporary coats, including those of former Roman provinces. In creating his work, Vitezović used a variety of sources, such as seals, coins, stone monuments. At the end of Stemmatografia, he lists short description of every coat of arms featured.

Vitezović himself stated his intentions are to disclose every individual coat of arms of each kingdom, province, notable city and fortress of the Illyricum, as well as their customs, nature, and movement of clans. He intended to publish a separate book detailing every noble lineage, including those who have descended from them in other European lands.

== Hristofor Žefarović edition ==
Forty years after its original Vienna release, the book was translated by the monk Hristofor Žefarović into the Slavo-Serbian, under the orders of Serbian patriarch Arsenije IV Jovanović. The copper engravings of the coats of arms were done by the young Viennese artist Thomas Messmer. According to Ivo Banac, this edition had a strong influence on the development of heraldry in Bulgaria, Serbia and Romania. The book is also regarded as the first "Serbian book" published in the 18th century.

== Gallery ==
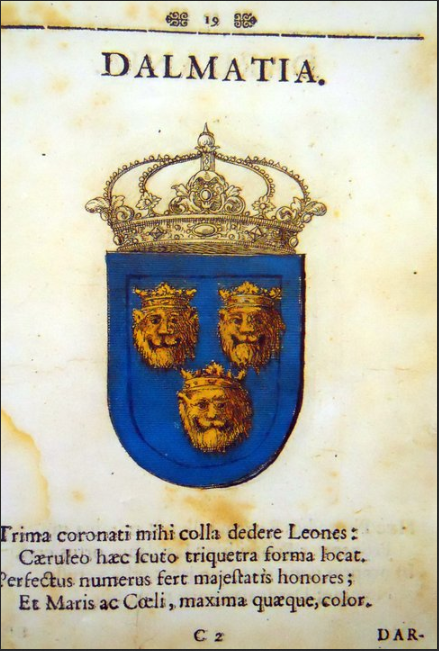
"Dalmatia"

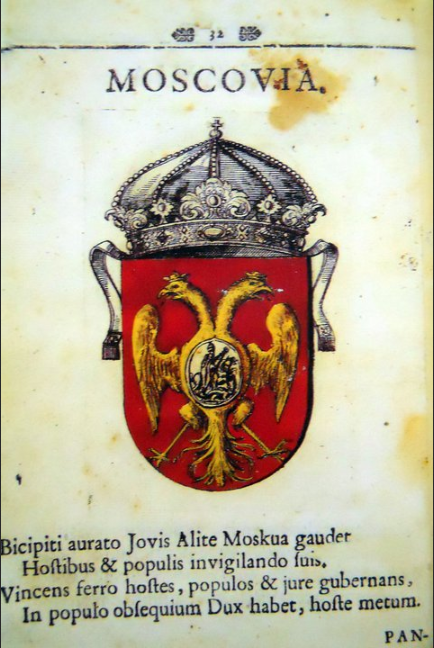
"Moscovia" (Grand Duchy of Moscow)

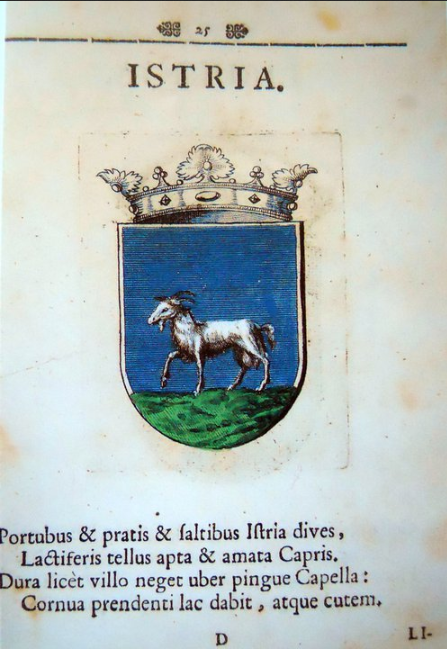
Istria

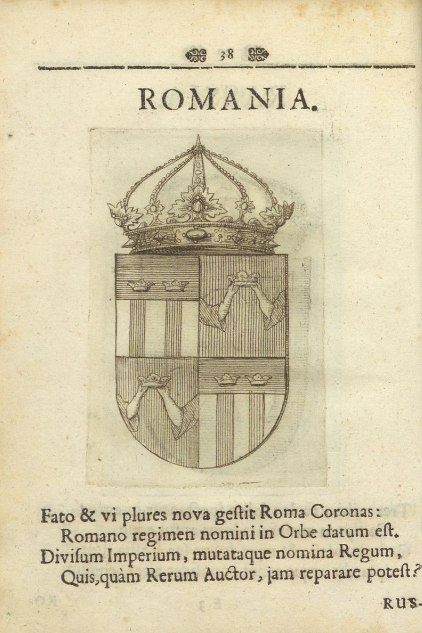
"Romania" (Eastern Rumelia)

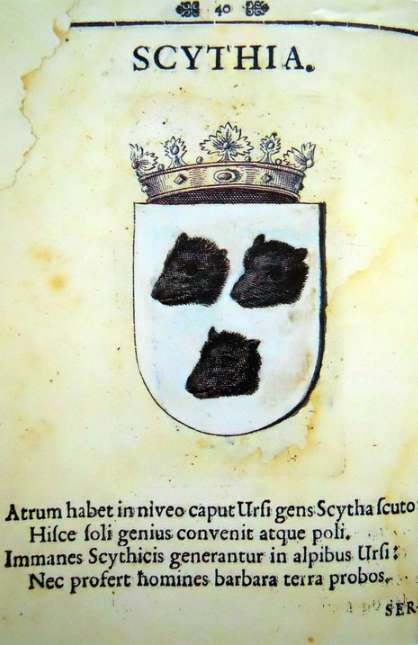
"Scythia"

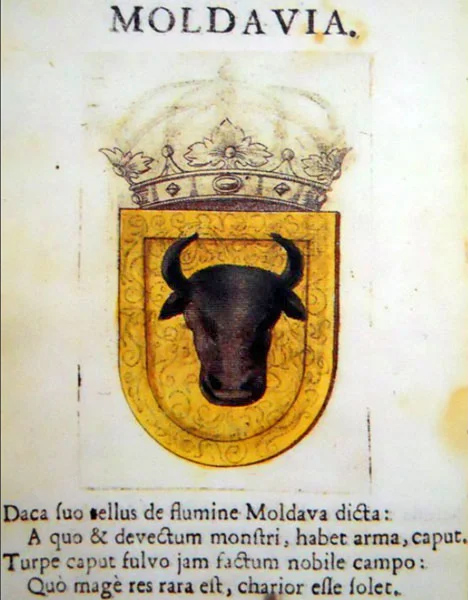
"Moldavia"

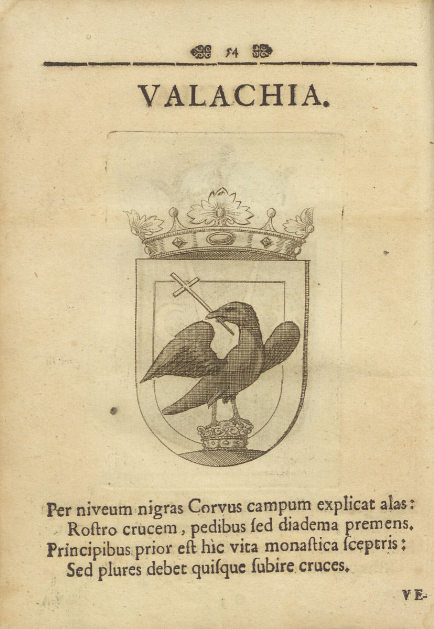
"Valachia" (Wallachia)

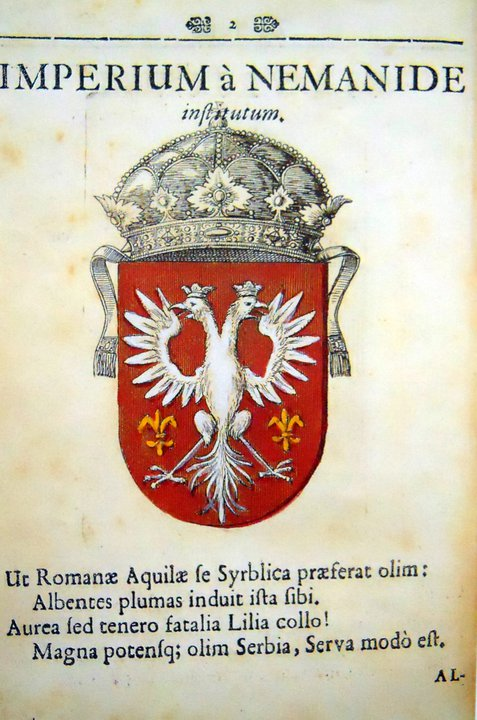
"Empire of the Nemanjić"

== Literature ==
- Grbovi Senjskih Rittera Vitezovića, E. Ljubović
- The pen and the sword: studies in Bulgarian history, James Franklin Clarke, Dennis P. Hupchick, East European Monographs, 1988
- Paissi of Hilendar: Father of the Bulgarian Enlightenment, Velcho Velchev, Sofia Press, 1981
- Empires and Peninsulas: Southeastern Europe Between Karlowitz and the Peace of Adrianople, 1699-1829, Plamen Mitev, LIT Verlag Münster, 2010
