= Jovan Georgijević =

Serbian Eastern Orthodox leader

- Metropolis: Karlovci
- In office: 1769–1773
- Predecessor: Pavle Nenadović
- Successor: Vićentije Jovanović Vidak

Personal details
- Born: c. 1710 Sremski Karlovci, Habsburg monarchy
- Died: 23 May 1773 Sremski Karlovci, Habsburg monarchy
- Denomination: Eastern Orthodox

Jovan Georgijević or Jovan Đorđević (Serbian Cyrillic: Јован Георгијевић/Ђорђевић; 1710 — 1773) was the Metropolitan of Karlovci from 1769 to 1773. He succeeded Metropolitan Pavle Nenadović.

He assumed the office of the Metropolitan of Karlovci in a dramatic period (1769-1773) when orders were issued from the highest place for a revision of the Orthodox calendar. It was at a time when prelates of the Metropolitan See of Karlovci were powerful "Princes of the Church," though their power gradually diminished with the passage of time, though they had considerable influence on the Austrian court at the time.

The Metropolitanate tended to look towards Imperial Russia when things were wanting in Austria and the same the other way around. In 1770 the Austrian authorities finally issued the necessary permits for the establishment of a Serb Cyrillic press in Vienna (given to Josef von Kurzböck) with the proviso that there be no more importation of books from Imperial Russia, an aim of lessening Russian influence among the Serbs. At the request of Empress Maria Theresa to reduce the number of religious holidays celebrated by the Roman Catholic and Orthodox churches, as many as fifty-six feast days were abolished in the Orthodox calendar, thanks to the expedient efforts of Metropolitan Georgijević. It was a measure that caused great discontent among Serbian critics of the Metropolitanate of Karlovci, though Georgijević was least fazed by it because he believed that it was for the best. Also, he was a great benefactor of Serbian art as well as an eloquent interpreter of national ideas in all foreign-occupied areas of the Empire populated by Serbs. He wrote and disseminated religious and secular literature in cities, towns, villages and all remote rural regions contributing to the advancement of education and literacy among his people and their co-religionists, Vlahs and Greeks. In addition, he commissioned three important engravings for the needs of the Metropolitanate of Karlovci, where the first attempts at reforming Church Cyrillic in 1762 were made.

He died in Sremski Karlovci on 23 May 1773 and was succeeded by Vićentije Jovanović Vidak.

== See also ==
- Metropolitanate of Karlovci
