= Isaija II =

Isaija II (Antonović) or Isaija Antonović (worldly name: Jovan Antonović; Budapest, Habsburg monarchy, 1696 - Vienna, Habsburg Monarchy, 22 January 1749) was Metropolitan of Karlovac from 1748 to 1749.

== Biography ==
He was born in Budapest in 1696 to father Antonije and mother Susanna. He was named Jovan at his baptism in the Serbian Orthodox Church. He received a good education, married his childhood sweetheart, and joined the priesthood in Buda in the rank of a married man, but when he became a widower he joined the Serbian Kovin Monastery and was tonsured there and on the island of Csepel, he took the monastic name of Isaija. In 1731 he was elected Archimandrite of the Monastery of Kovin where he was also made Bishop of Arad on 15 December of that year. With another bishop (Nikola Dimitrijević of Timišvar) he was instrumental in getting a Serbian divinity college established in the region. Metropolitan Mojsije Petrović sent him as his deputy to the Varaždin Generalate to conduct a canonical visit. However, the authorities did not receive him because he allegedly was a friend of priest Nikola, who called for border guards to revolt.

Beyond the knowledge of the church authorities, he was confirmed in 1741 as the bishop of Vršac, which led to some unrest at the church-national assembly in Sremski Karlovci in 1744, but it all simmered down. He was elected Metropolitan of Karlovci at the Church and People's Assembly in Sremski Karlovci on 27 August 1748. Under the circumstances, he was forced to swear an oath where the part that emphasized the dependence of the Metropolitan of Karlovci on the Patriarchate of Peć was omitted. A few days after he was elected Metropolitan (31 August 1748), he made one appeal to the people, requesting that voluntary contributions be made for the purpose of establishing a college fund for higher education.Shortly afterward, on September 2, 1748, the Holy Synod of Bishops made the decision to refer the Bishop of Osijek to Bishop Sofronije (Jovanović) of Pakrac in the Eparchy of Slavonia. But ten years later, in 1758, the Bishop of Osijek was once again returned to the Metropolitanate of Karlovci.

He was elected Metropolitan of Karlovac at the Church and People's Assembly in Sremski Karlovci on 27 August 1748. Under the circumstances, he had to swear an oath where the part that emphasized the dependence of the Metropolitanate of Karlovci on the Patriarchate of Peć was dropped. A few days after he was elected Metropolitan (31 August 1748),he made one appeal to the people. He requested that voluntary contributions be made for the purpose of establishing a college fund for higher education. Also, he appealed to Maria Theresa to allow Serb merchants from the Ottoman Empire to settle the port city of Trieste on the Adriatic. Shortly afterward, on 2 September 1748, the Holy Synod of Bishops made the decision to refer the Bishop of Osijek to Bishop Sofronije Jovanović of Pakrac in Slavonia. Ten years later, in 1758, the Osijek region was again returned to the Metropolitanate of Karlovci.

Metropolitan Isaija did not stay long as Metropolitan of Karlovac. He died in Vienna on 22 January 1749 and was buried on 6 February at St. Dimitrije's Congregational Church in Budapest. This church was demolished after World War II by the Communists who came into power.
