= Pavao Ritter Vitezović =

Croatian writer

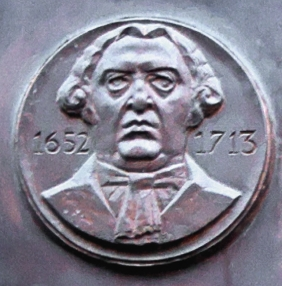
- Born: Paulo Ritter; 7 January 1652; Senj, Croatian Military Frontier, Habsburg monarchy
- Died: 20 January 1713 (aged 61); Vienna, Habsburg Monarchy
- Occupations: Historian, linguist, publisher, poet, political theorist, diplomat, printmaker, draughtsman, cartographer, writer, printer.
- Writing career
- Pen name: Paul Vitezović
- Language: Latin, Croatian
- Notable works: Odiljenje sigetsko; Croatia Rediviva; Stemmatografia; Plorantis Croatiae saecula duo

Pavao Ritter Vitezović (Croatian pronunciation: [pâʋao rîter ʋitěːzoʋitɕ]; 7 January 1652 – 20 January 1713) was a Habsburg-Croatian polymath, variously described as a historian, linguist, publisher, poet, political theorist, diplomat, printmaker, draughtsman, cartographer, writer and printer.

== Biography ==
=== Early life ===
Pavao Ritter Vitezović was born as Pavao Ritter in Senj, the son of a frontier soldier. His father, Antun Ritter, was a descendant of an ethnic German immigrant from Alsace, while his mother, Dorotea Lučkinić, was a native Senj woman.

He finished six grades of the Jesuit-run gymnasium in Zagreb before moving to Rome, where he stayed at the Illyrian College and met the renowned Dalmatian historian Ivan Lučić. He then moved to the castle of Bogenšperk (German: Wagensberg) near the town of Litija in Carniola (now in Slovenia), where natural historian Johann Weikhard von Valvasor influenced him to study his national history and geography. There he also learned German and the skills of printing and etching.

=== Early writings ===
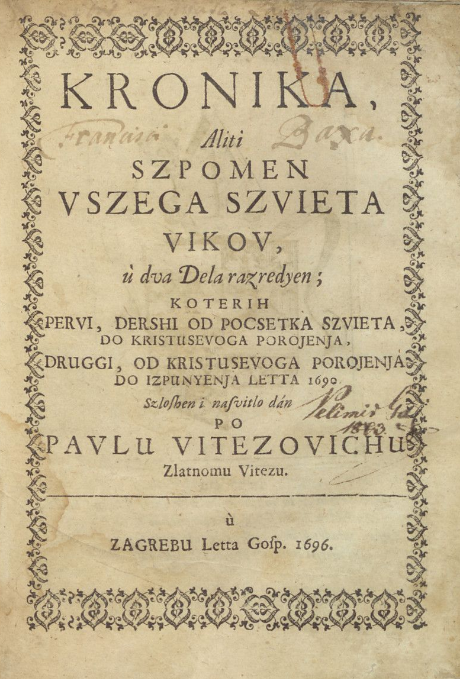
Kronika aliti spomen vsega svijeta vikov (1696, Zagreb) is the only Croatian-language history book published in the 17th century.

In 1677 he wrote a treatise on the Gusić clan, published in 1681, the same year he wrote a number of poems for Father Aleksandar Mikulić, a Zagreb canon. As he developed a reputation of a learned man, his native town of Senj elected him as their representative in the various parliaments in Sopron, Požun and Vienna. On 19 April 1683, due to the efforts of Ritter Vitezović, the Austrian Imperial chancellary proclaimed a charter granting the town of Senj their ancient rights, protecting them from the local military commander captain Herberstein who had terrorised the citizens at the time.

Because of the Ottoman wars he was enlisted and stationed in the Međimurje tabor (garrison) under ban Nicholas Erdödy. In 1683, when the Great Turkish War started, he participated in the capture of the forts of Lendava and Szigetvar. After the war, ban Erdödy employed him as an officer of his court, where he also met Adam Zrinski, the son of Nikola Zrinski. He was initially named the podžupan of Lika a purely honourable title with no actual significance.

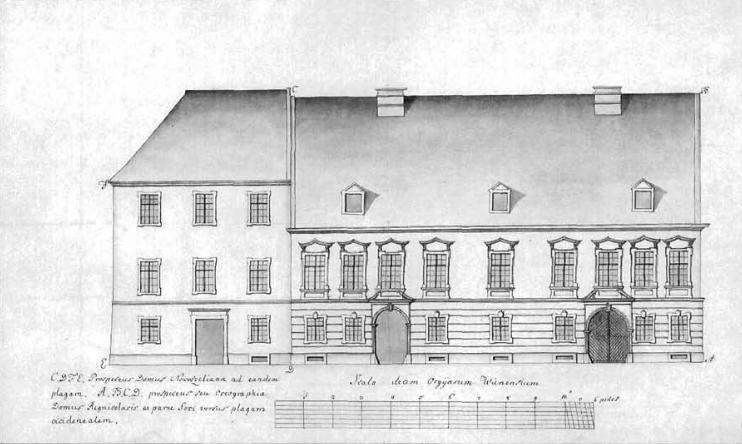
Vitezović's house in the Upper town in Zagreb (left)

Then Croatian Parliament named him as their representative in the Imperial commission for the delimitation with Venice and Turkey, but despite his contribution, the borderlines were drawn against Croatian interests, which greatly frustrated Ritter Vitezović. During his work at the royal and imperial diets in Vienna and Bratislava, Vitezović met many dignitaries from Croatia, and at one point wished to return home to live in Zagreb.

=== Later years ===
Sometime in the early 1690s, he returned to Croatia, where he found out that there was a printing house in the Bishop's Palace in the city of Zagreb, acquired in 1663, but long since abandoned. He asked his long-time friend Aleksandar Mikulić, who had by that time been named Bishop, to let him put it to use. He was soon in business, printing calendars and leaflets, and he appealed to the Croatian Parliament to give that printing house an official capacity. On 11 November 1694, the Parliament did indeed appoint him as the manager of the facility. He then proceeded to move it from the Vlaška street to his house on Grič, and then travelled to Vienna, where he bought a new printing press and everything else necessary for the printing of books. He named the new printing office the "Museum" (like Valvasor before him), and printed the first books in Latin and in Croatian.

The printing house was in operation between 1695 and 1706, and his best known work Croatia Rediviva ("Croatia Revived") was printed there in 1700. On 14 June 1706, the press was largely destroyed in a great fire, and Vitezović's wife died two years later, rendering him entirely distraught.

In 1710 he moved to Vienna, where he continued to publish, and was awarded an honorary title of a baron at the Austrian court. This however did not help his material status before he died in 1713.

== Historiography and linguistics ==
His first work, a tractate abouth the dukes of Krbava, Gusić, was written in 1677, and subsequently published in 1684, Ljubljana.

Upon establishing his printing press in Zagreb, he published a didactic work in Croatian Kronika aliti spomen vsega svieta vikov (1696), which was essentially a compilation of works from Antun Vramec (1578). In it he argued that Dalmatia had always been part of Croatia. He continued to advocate for such stances in an unpublished critique of Johannes Lucius' De regno Croatia et Dalmatiae.

In 1700, he published his most significant work, Croatia Rediviva, in which he worked out an idea of equating Croats with all South Slavs, a concept which he expanded in a large unfinished work De aris et focis Illyriorum (On Illyrian altars and hearths).

By the end of his life, he published a history of Bosnia (1712, Bosna captiva) and a lineage of Ladislaus I of Hungary (1704), in which he attempted to prove that Ladislaus did not originate from the Arpads, but from the Trpimirović. He also wrote a number of shorter texts, remaining only in manuscript; biographies Saint Vladimir and Skanderbeg, a history of the Ban of Croatia (Banologia), a lost text about the Hungarian acquisition of Croatia during the Middle Ages, and histories of Serbia.

His only linguistical work, a Latin-Croatian dictionary Lexicon Latino-Illyricum, was preserved in manuscript. When writing in Croatian, he initially used his native Chakavian regiolect, but subsequently also embraced Shtokavian and Kajkavian elements, similar to the Ozalj literary circle.

== Printmaking and cartography ==
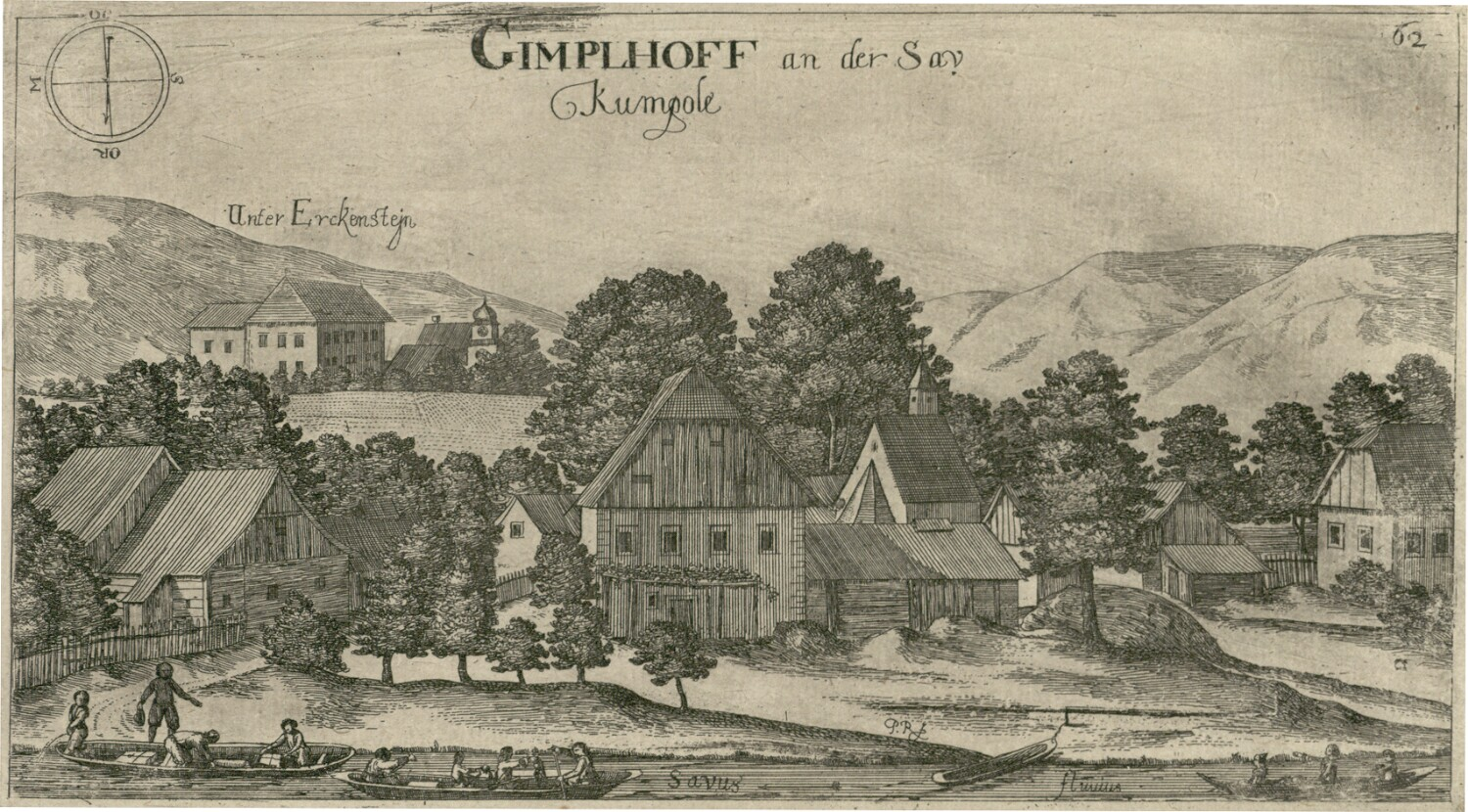
Depiction of Kompolje, Slovenia, signed as P.R.f (Paul Ritter fecit - made by Pavao Ritter) c. 1679

Vitezović contributed between 54 and 60 prints to Valvasor's Topographia Ducatus Carnioliae Modernae (1679) and Glory of the Duchy of Carniola (1689), both as draftsman and engraver. These were typically cities and places of Croatia and Carniola, which according to Vjekoslav Klaić, he "visited carrying a sketchbook, drew them, transcribing them later onto copper plates". His abilities as a graphic artist were later used in his 1701 heraldic book Stemmatografia. He studied cartography under Austrian Georg Matthäus Vischer, whose maps of Austria influenced his later works, which he used in his 1700 work Croatia rediviva.

As a skilled cartographer, he became a member of the Austrian military commission for the demarcation of the Croatian lands and the Ottoman Empire (1699), under Ferdinand Luigi Marsigli. He, along with other contributors sketched the neighbouring areas, much of which is preserved in the National Archives of Austria. A total of five maps are preserved in the Croatian State Archives, which are attributed to him.

== Poetry ==
He wrote his poems both in Latin and Croatian. His first major poetical work Odiljenje sigetsko (The Separation of Siget) was first published in 1679, in Linz. The third edition of the work was later self-published in Zagreb in 1695. It is variously described as an epic poem centered on the aforementioned siege (similar to Vazetje Sigeta Grada) or a lyrical commentary of Petar Zrinski's Adrianskoga mora Sirena (Siren of the Adriatic Sea), all written in doubly rhymed dodecasyllable, typical rhyming scheme in Croatia at the time. He wrote Latin epistles to a number of Croatian, Austrian and Hungarian dignitaries and friends, numbering roughly 9000 lines of verse. In 1703, he self-published (Zagreb) Plorantis Croatiae Saecula Duo (Two Centuries of Croatia in Mourning), a work which is described as a poeticized chronicle framed as a pseudo-autobiography, and an allegory to the baroque Stabat Mater topos. It is centered on first-person narration by a personified Croatia (presented as mother-homeland), which tells its tale as a personal history of suffering with detailed psychosomatic manifestations. This was followed by a vernacular poem Senjčica (1704), which demonstrates Vitezović was primarily motivated by patriotism, making him a precursor of such Croatian poets of the 19th century. He wrote another similar work, Novljančica, which was lost.

Overall reception to Vitezović's poetry has been mixed. While the historian Violeta Moretti praised his epistolaries as "mainly rich, well formed and fluent", she criticized his other Latin poems as being elusive in their meaning. Zrinka Blažević of the University of Zagreb praised his work Two Centuries of Croatia in Mourning as among the best Croatian poetical works in Latin, containing great aesthetic qualities and an unusual narrative structure. Conversely, Mihovil Kombol regarded his work Odiljenje sigetsko as lacking great poetic invention, instead treating its value primarily in historiographical terms. This interpretation was criticized by literary historian and writer Pavao Pavličić, stating Vitezović had excellent knowledge of language and skill in versification, managing to create great and inventive poetry in certain places within the work. Pavličić claimed this negative view stemmed from misinterpretation of Vitezović's intentions, which is not to create an epic, but a lyrical collection intended to expand the existing aspects of the Siege of Siget.

== Legacy ==
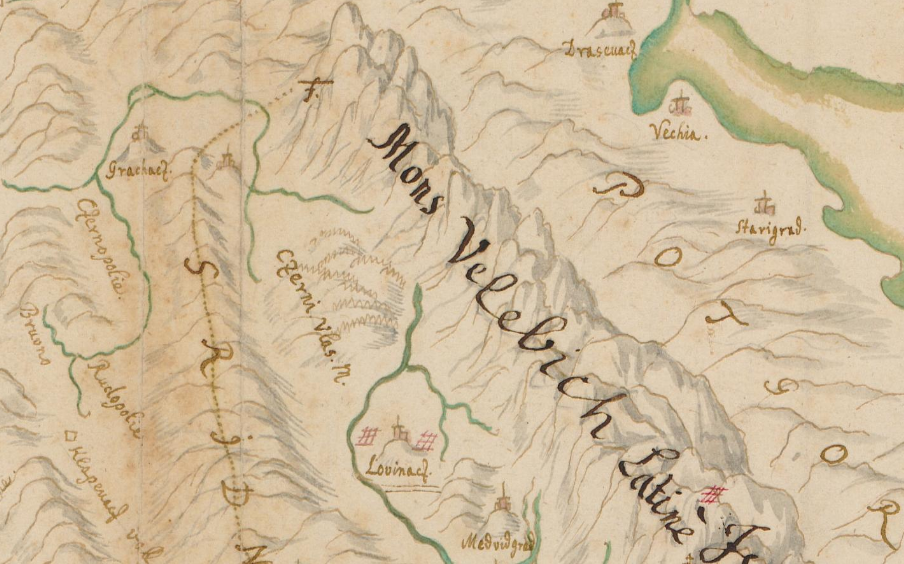
Map of Velebit and the surrounding area, as drawn by Vitezović in 1701 (detail)

Literary historians such as Branko Vodnik, Mihovil Kombol regard him as a major figure of his age, particularly important for his ideas, using his vast energy and considerable talent to produce more works than perhaps all other individuals combined within Croatia proper during the 18th century. They also describe him as the most visionary and complete Croatian author of his time. In his literary works, he was traditional and innovative on one hand drawing parallels with Ignjat Đurđević, and on the other strove to bring his books to the masses and those less educated, which brought him closer to the Age of Enlightenment. He wrote his works in Latin and Croatian, covering a great variety of genres and themes, which included his many interests in historiography, heraldry, poetry, copper engraving, publishing and printing monthly periodicals, proverbs, puzzles, poetics, linguistics and geography.

Ritter Vitezović proposed an idea for orthography solution for the Croatian language that every sound should have only one letter, and this idea later inspired the linguist Ljudevit Gaj to reform the Croatian variant of Latin script and create Gaj's Latin alphabet.

He created the Croatian exclusivist discourse within the early Illyrian movement and introduced the 'historical appropriation' concept to the Balkans which is actually an idea to claim national territory on the basis of the past conquests. He was the first ideologist of Croatian nation who proclaimed that all Slavs are Croats. The foundations of the concept of Greater Croatia are laid in Vitezović's works. His works were used to legitimize the expansionism of the Habsburg Empire in southeastern Europe by asserting its historical rights to claim Illyria. "Illyria" as Slavic territory projected by Vitezović would eventually incorporate not only most of southeastern Europe but also Hungary. Vitezović defined Croatian territory, as including, besides Illyria and all Slavic-populated territory, the territory between the Adriatic, Black and Baltic seas. Ferdo Šišić consequently regarded "Croatia Rediviva" as a "Bible of Croat national policy in the 19th century", inspiring such individuals as Ljudevit Gaj, Eugen Kvaternik and Ante Starčević.

His heraldic works influenced Balkan nationalistic iconography of the 19th century in Serbia, Bulgaria and Romania. He also wrote the first history of the Serbs, which remains in manuscript. He skillfully fabricated numerous genealogies and forged most of the Trophaeum nobilissimae domus Estorasianae (a genealogical treatise ordered by Pál Esterházy).

== Written works ==
In Latin:

- Apographum ex Joanne Lucio (1681)
- Novus Skenderbeg (1682)
- Nova Musa (1683)
- Anagrammaton liber primus (1687)
- Croatia Rediviva (Revived Croatia Archived 2016-01-14 at the Wayback Machine, or Croatia Reborn, 1700)
- Stemmatografia sive armorum Illyricorum delineatio, descriptio et restitutio (1701; Zagreb, 1702)
- Plorantis Croatiae saecula duo (Two Centuries of Croatia in Mourning, 1703)
- Bossna captiva (Bosnia in Captivity, 1712)

In Croatian:

- Odiljenje sigetsko (1684)
- Priričnik aliti razliko mudrosti cvitje (1703)
- Senjčica (1704)
- Kronika aliti spomen vsega svieta vikov (1696)
- Lado horvacki iliti Sibila (1701 ?)
- Zoroašt hervacki, later Misečnik hervacki (periodical, 1695–1705)

Unpublished (in manuscript):

- Banologia
- Indigetes Illyricani sive Vitae Sanctorum Illyrici (about 1706), a hagiography of 120 Illyrian saints
- Opuscula varia ad historiam illyricam spectantia (manuscript)
- Sive de banatu Croatiae
- Serbia illustrata
- Lexicon Latino-illyricum
