= Church of Saint Demetrius, Budapest =

Church of Saint Demetrius
- Church of the Holy Trinity
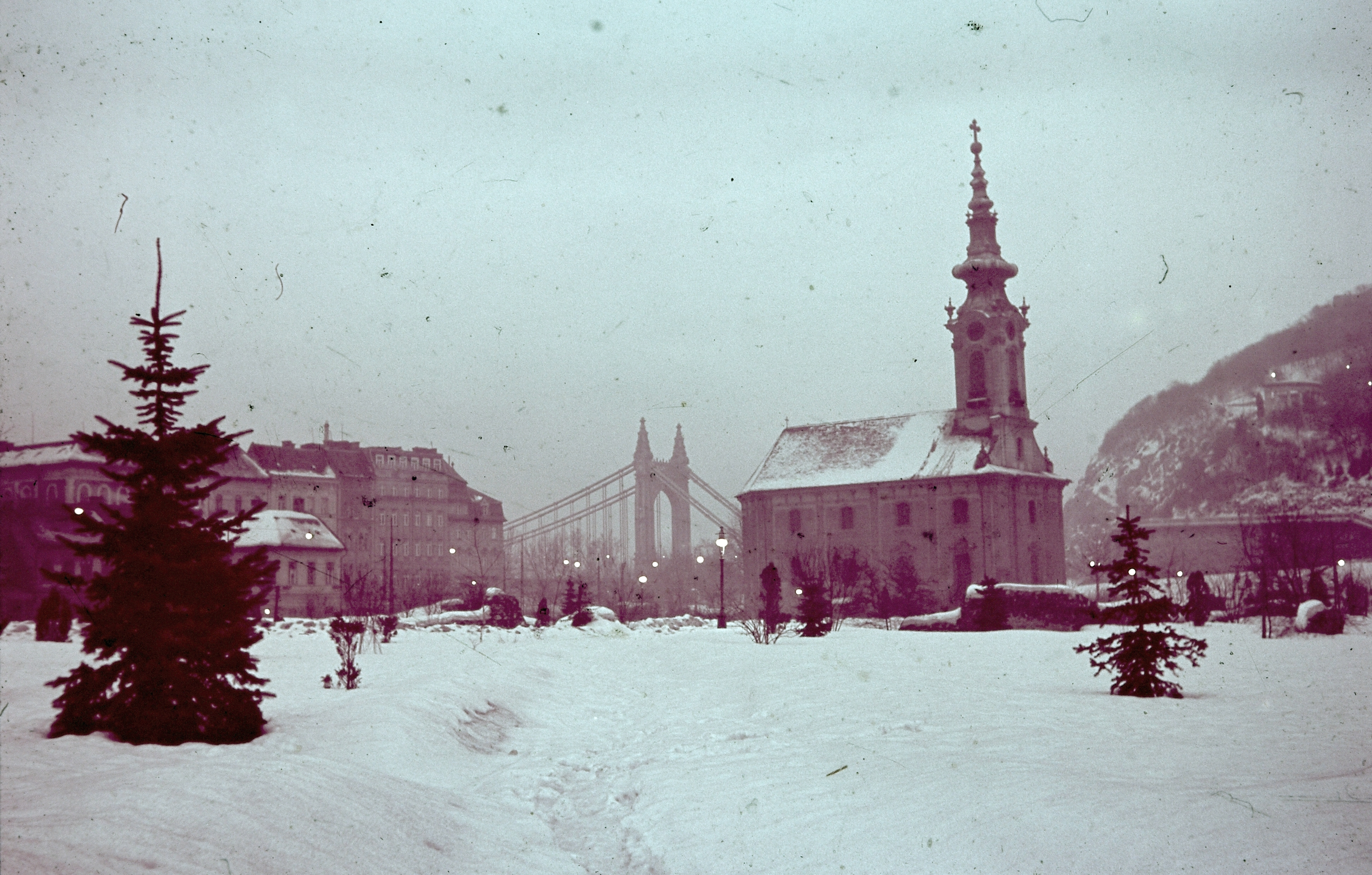
- The church from Tabán Park in 1943
- Church of Saint Demetrius
- 47.491246°N 19.043760°E
- Location: Budapest
- Country: Hungary
- Denomination: Serbian Orthodox Church

History
- Status: parish church, co-cathedral
- Founded: 1697
- Founder: Arsenije III Crnojević
- Dedication: Saint Demetrius, Holy Trinity
- Consecrated: 1698, 1751

Architecture
- Functional status: Demolished
- Heritage designation: Listed
- Designated: 1936
- Architect: Adam Mayerhoffer
- Architectural type: Single-nave church
- Style: Central European Baroque
- Groundbreaking: 1742
- Completed: 1751
- Closed: 1945
- Demolished: 1949

Specifications
- Materials: stone and brick

Administration
- Diocese: Eparchy of Buda

The Church of Saint Demetrius or the Church of the Holy Trinity, also known simply as the Serbian Church in Tabán (Hungarian: Tabáni szerb templom, Szent Demeter-templom, Szentháromság-templom, Serbian: Tabanska crkva, Srpska crkva u Tabanu, Crkva Svetog Dimitrija, Crkva Svete Trojice) was a Serbian Orthodox church in Budapest, Hungary, located in the Tabán quarter. It was built between 1742 and 1751 in Central European Baroque style by the Serbian community of Buda, and served as the co-cathedral of the Eparchy of Buda. The church was seriously damaged during the siege of Budapest in 1945, and was demolished in 1949.

== History ==
=== Establishment and early history ===
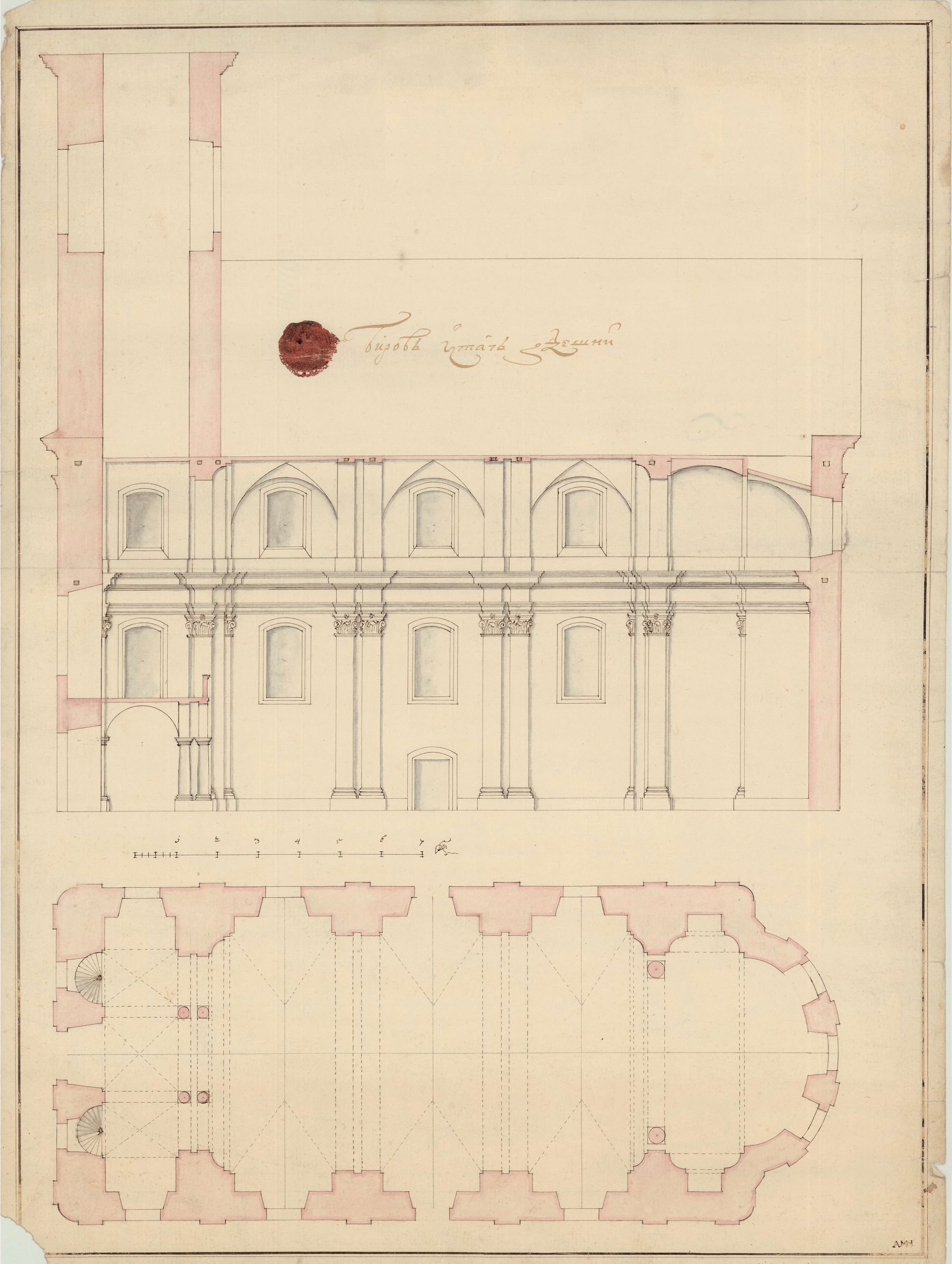
The plan of the church by Adam Mayerhoffer (1741)

The first group of Serbian refugees from the Balkans arrived in Buda in early November 1690. They belonged to the Great Migration of the Serbs from the Ottoman Empire to the Habsburg Empire led by Patriarch Arsenije III Crnojević, the Archbishop of Peć. The Cameral Administration of Buda resettled almost 600 families between Castle Hill and Gellért Hill in the Lower Town which had been destroyed during the siege of Buda in 1686. The new neighbourhood was called Tabán, also known as Raitzenstadt, meaning "the town of the Serbs". The first census in 1696 recorded more than 1,000 Serbian families there (about 5,000 people). The majority of the new settlers followed the Eastern Orthodox faith. In 1702, 461 taxpaying heads of households belonged to the Serbian Orthodox Church, while 250 belonged to the Catholic Church.

Since the former Ottoman mosque of Sokollu Mustafa Pasha was converted into a Catholic church, the Serbs built their own temporary chapel nearby. Construction of a permanent church dedicated to Saint Demetrius began shortly after the Cameral Administration issued a permit on 23 September 1697. It was consecrated in 1698 by Arsenije III Crnojević, and a tower was added in 1716. The Tabán parish had stavropegial status, meaning that it was directly under the jurisdiction of the Patriarch. During the 18th century the Serbian community increased in number and wealth, and established its own institutions.

Due to the frequent flooding of the Danube, the church was repeatedly damaged, and in 1738 the townspeople, in consultation with the Bishop of Buda, Vasilije Dimitrijević, decided to replace it with a more durable and monumental structure. The design of the new church was entrusted to Adam Mayerhoffer whose contract was signed on 29 March 1741. The parish applied for a building permit on 12 August 1741. The Serbs argued that the project was a reconstruction, as the roof of the existing building was leaking and the surrounding wooden houses posed a fire hazard. They emphasized that both the foundation and the walls of the new church would be made of stone for greater safety. The city council denied the request because the construction of new Eastern Orthodox churches was not permitted. After an appeal by the Serbs, the Lieutenancy Council authorized the project, accepting that it was a necessary reconstruction. The building permit was finally issued on 28 April 1742.

Construction work began on 1 May 1742, and the vault and the roof of the nave was already complete on 26 November. The plans were slightly modified in the final build. Due to a shortage of funds, the new church was equipped between 1745 and 1747 with icons salvaged from the previous building. In 1751 Bishop Dionisije Novaković consecrated the church to the Holy Trinity, while a chapel in the loft was established in honor of Saint Demetrius to carry on the tradition. This was the largest church building in the whole Metropolitanate of Karlovci and the only one with two rows of windows.

At first, the tower had a simple pyramidal roof clad with shingles, but in 1775 a richly decorated copper spire was added. Designed by Mihajlo Sokolović, it was considered one of the finest Rococo church spires in Central Europe. A painted and gilt wood model was made by Joseph Leonard Weber in 1774 which still exists.

The surroundings of the church were narrow and cramped, and the houses were mainly built of wood or mud bricks. In 1766, the Serbian community sought to enlarge the churchyard because the church was surrounded by "small hovels" and they could not even hold a procession. They requested a property-tax exemption for the entire plot that was granted the following year. In 1769, the site included a house for the magistrate’s office and the school, and another for the schoolmaster and the sexton.

=== 19th century ===
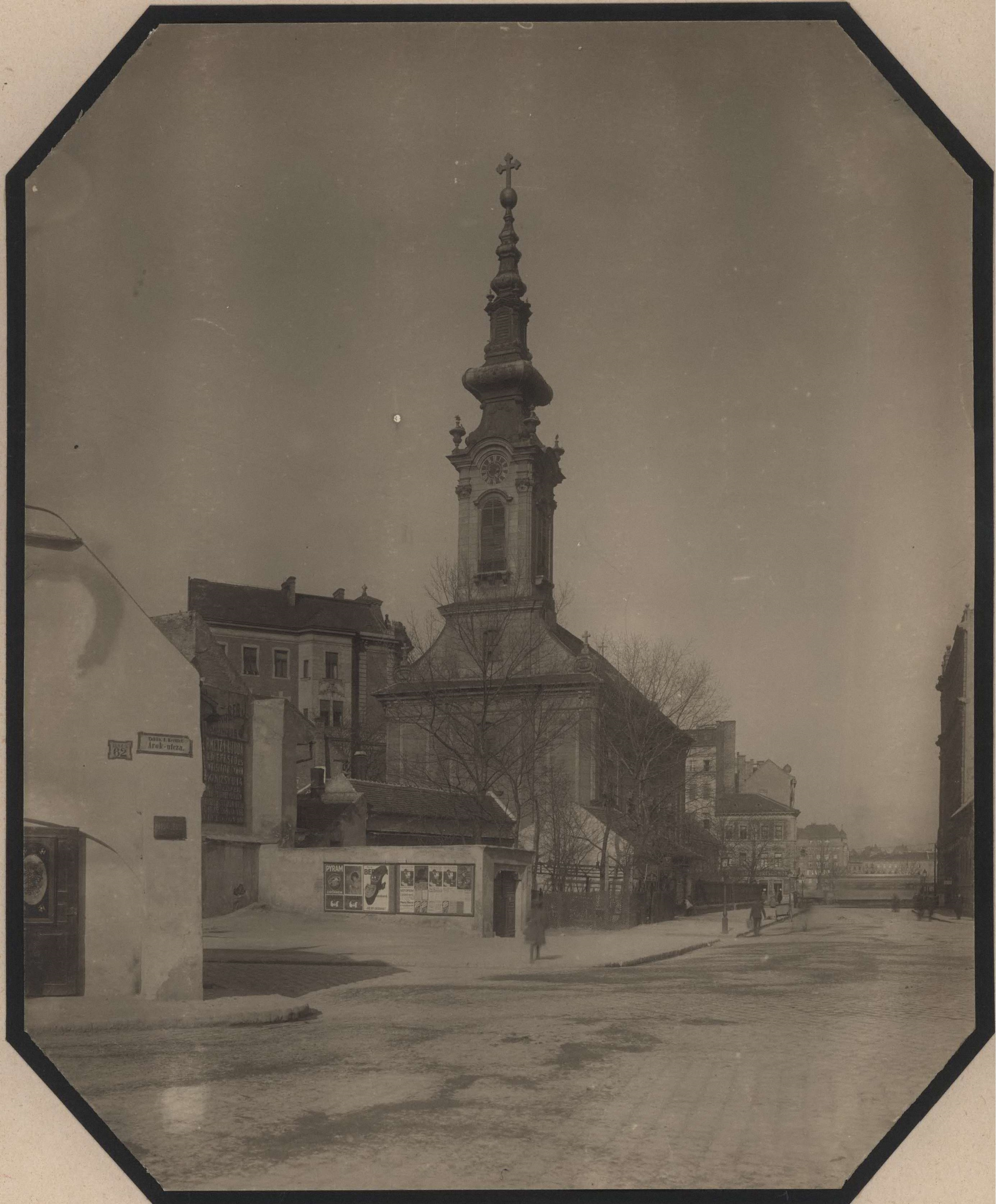
The church around 1912 from Hadnagy utca

Petar Vitković (Péter Vitkovics) served as the church’s priest from 1803 until his death in 1808. An erudite and jovial polyglot who spoke Serbian, Hungarian, German, Latin and Greek, he wrote several treatises and orations, and had a large personal library. His younger son, Jovan Vitković (1785–1849) succeeded him and formed close friendships with Benedek Virág, a Hungarian poet and historian living in Tabán, and Matija Petar Katančić, a Franciscan friar, pioneering archaeologist, and Croatian writer.

The church was burned out in the Great Tabán Fire of 1810, which destroyed the whole district; as a contemporary report recorded, "only its copper spire survived." The reconstruction was a lengthy process that continued into the early 1820s.

At the end of October 1814, the three rulers of the Holy Alliance, King Francis I, King Frederick William III of Prussia and Emperor Alexander I of Russia visited Buda during the Congress of Vienna. Archduke Joseph, the Palatine of Hungary, accompanied them to the Serbian Orthodox church, where the young priest Jovan Vitković, who was the archduke’s protégé, received them. At 10.30 a.m., the church was full of people when the three rulers arrived. On this occasion, Vitković delivered three orations: he greeted King Francis in Latin, the Emperor of Russia in Slavic, and the King of Prussia in German.

The church was damaged again by the Great Danube Flood of 1838, when the water reached a depth of 110 cm inside the building. The surroundings of the cathedral have changed with the renewal of the area after the disasters, when a new square was created along the southern and eastern sides of the church. It was called Kirchenplatz (Egyház tér) and served as the main square of the district. In this new setting, the church had a narrow churchyard to the south and east, and was surrounded on the northern and western sides by an enclosed courtyard and smaller buildings owned by the Serbian parish.

The housing conditions of Tabán improved gradually in the 19th century, especially after the unification of Budapest in 1873, when the city grew into a booming modern capital during the age of the Dual Monarchy. In the late 1890s, the Serbian Orthodox parish built a large new tenement house on a nearby lot, which also served as the headquarters of the deanery. At the same time, the church was restored in Neo-Baroque style. Its urban context changed fundamentally between 1898 and 1903, when the central part of Tabán was rebuilt, creating new roads and squares, demolishing the poorest quarters, and constructing a new bridge across the Danube.

In the second half of the century, Jeremija Mađarević (Jeremiás Magyarevics) served as the parish priest from 1864 until 1896. He was loyal to the Hungarian state and a long-standing member of the Budapest Legislative Committee.

=== 20th century and destruction ===
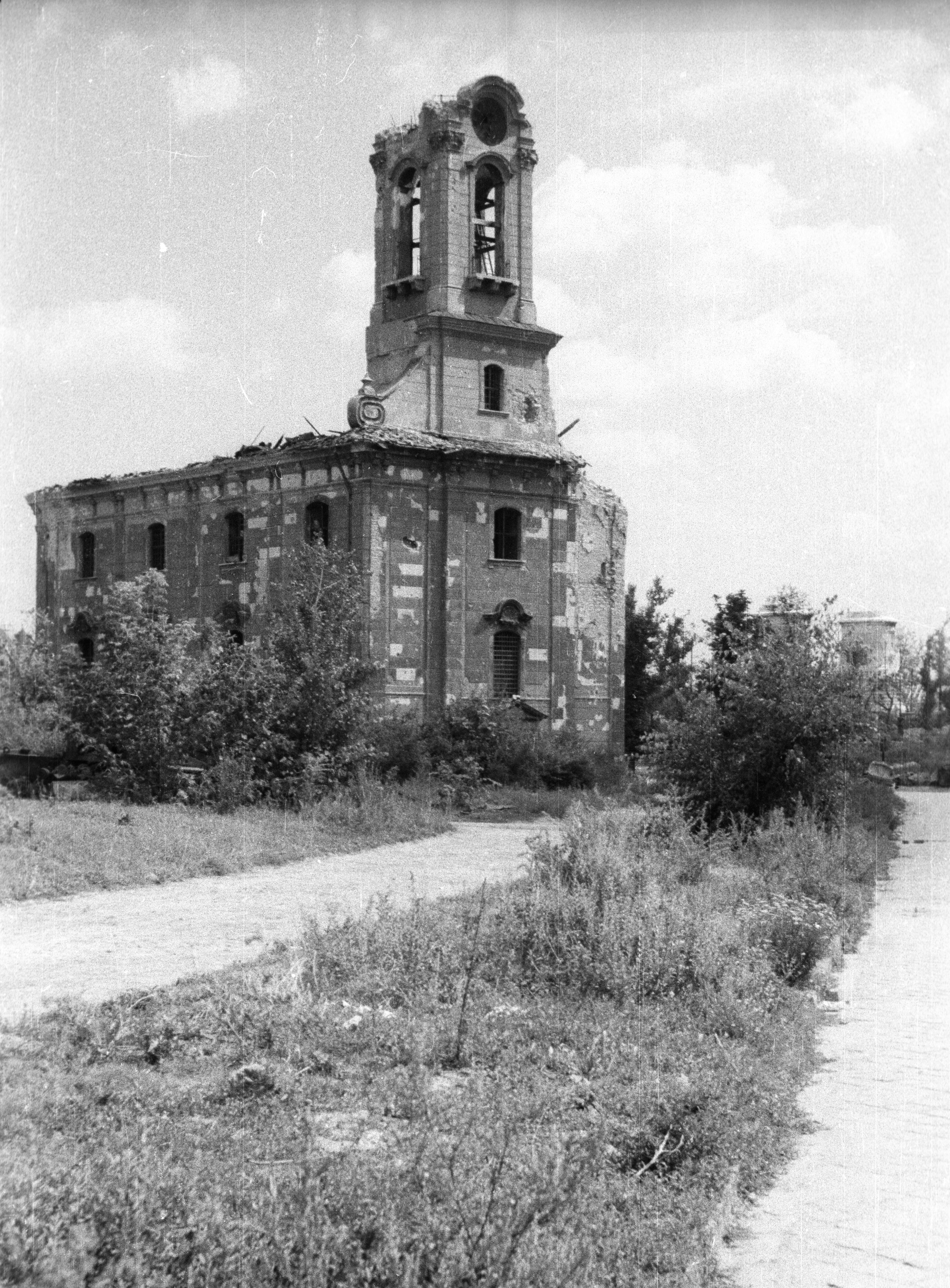
The ruins of the church in 1945

In 1907, the church was fitted with a new bell, which was consecrated by Bishop Lukijan Bogdanović and first tolled on 8 June, the service marking the 40th anniversary of Franz Joseph's coronation. In the spring of 1916, the bells were requisitioned by the government and melted down for war purposes. In 1933–1934, much of Tabán was demolished by the municipality of Budapest, but the church, which was still in use by the Eparchy of Buda, was preserved. The 1934 urban plan envisaged the creation of a sunken courtyard around the church and a row of arches along a planned new thoroughfare. However, in the following years a new park was laid out on the site of the demolished district, and the excavated Tabán ruins were incorporated into the design of the green area. The last buildings around the church, including the large tenement house owned by the Serbian parish and the old parish house, were demolished in 1938. In the last ten years of its existence, the church stood isolated in the middle of a park, as almost all traces of the former Rácváros had disappeared due to large-scale demolitions. The Serbian Orthodox population in the area was also greatly reduced as a result of these changes.

The building was seriously damaged in the siege of Budapest in 1944–45. The Rococo spire and the roof were destroyed, and parts of the vault collapsed, but the interior and the iconostasis remained intact. The liturgical objects and the paintings were saved by the parish priest, Dusán Vujicsics (Dušan Vujičić). Although the church was no longer fit for use, the priest strongly opposed its demolition. In early 1946, György Zubkovics (Georgije Zubković), the Bishop of Buda, appealed to the government for assistance, but the municipality and the Council of Public Works opposed the restoration of the church. Contemporary urban planners regarded the cathedral as obsolete and a hindrance to the planned restructuring of the bridgehead area.

The ruined church was finally demolished in 1949. The cast-iron railings of the churchyard were re-erected in the garden of the Serbian Orthodox Church in Budakalász, while a few pieces of furniture were transferred by Dusán Vujicsics to the Serbian Orthodox Church in Pest. The area was landscaped, but just over a decade later it was fundamentally redeveloped during the construction of the new Elisabeth Bridge. In 1962, new roads and a traffic interchange were built over the site where the cathedral had once stood. In 2014, a memorial bell was erected nearby, designed by Kristóf Petrika and László Rétháti. The bell bears the coat of arms of the Eparchy of Buda and a Serbian inscription commemorating the foundation and later destruction of the former Serbian Orthodox cathedral.

== Architecture ==
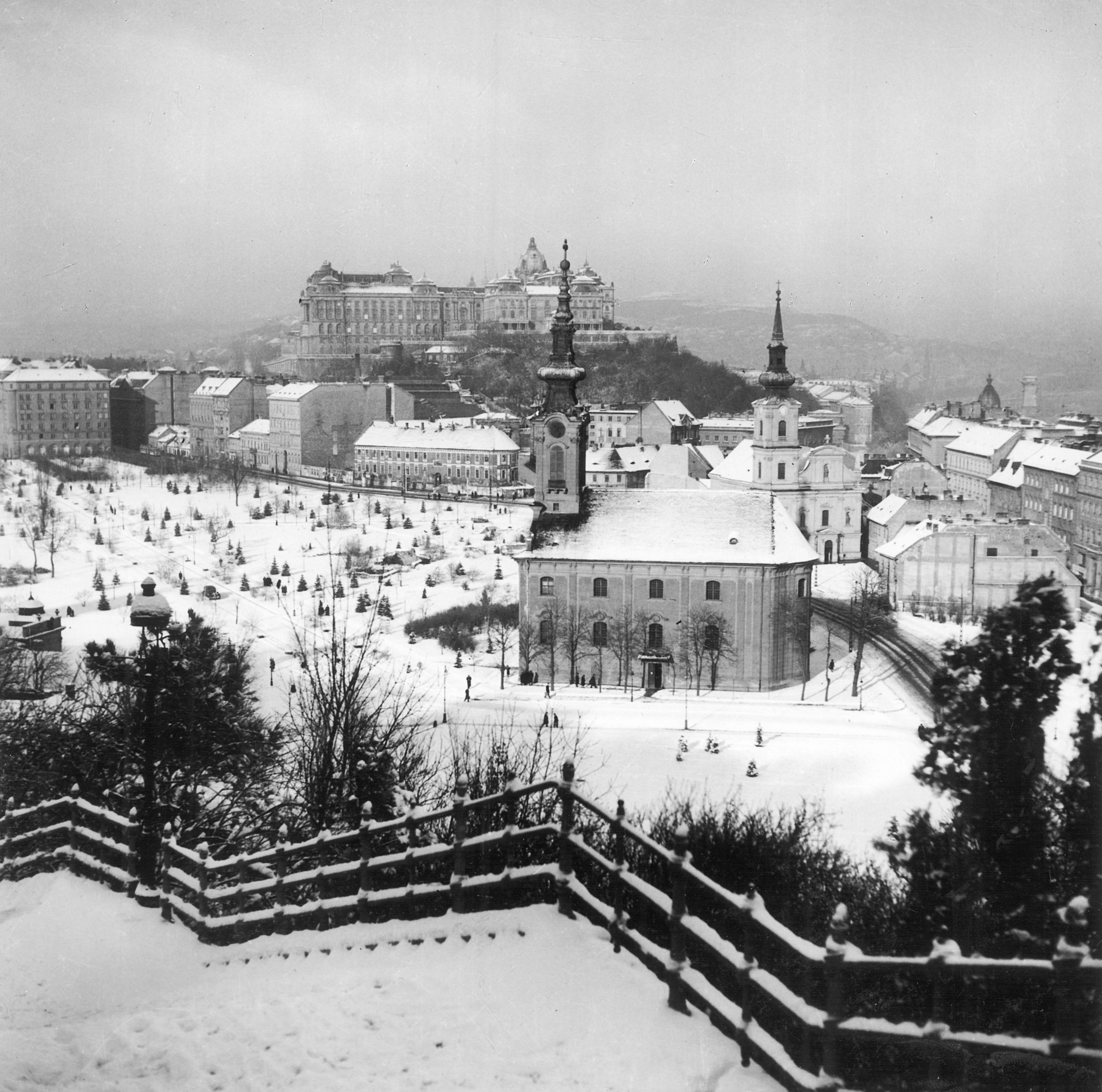
The church from Gellért Hill in 1942

The Church of Saint Demetrius was a freestanding single-nave Baroque church with a western tower and an eastern apse. Its walls were built of stone and brick. The western façade was divided into three vertical sections by simple pilaster strips. The slightly projecting central bay contained segmental-arched windows on three levels, with the largest on the first level crowned by a curved Baroque pediment with a shell motif. The side bays originally had four openings, later replaced by blind windows (these were removed during the Neo-Baroque remodelling). The heavy cornice was supported by large modillions. The western entrance was framed by an aedicular porch with two Ionic columns supporting a triangular pediment. The lower stage of the tower was flanked by voluted gables crowned by crosses, while the upper belfry stage had four arched openings on each side, each with an arched pediment and balconet. The corners of the belfry were emphasized by Corinthian pilasters. Above rose a Rococo copper spire adorned with flaming urns, rocaille ornaments, and a lantern. Four turret clocks were inserted into the curved cornice of the tower.

The architecture of the side facades was similar with lesenes and two rows of superimposed segmental arched windows. The larger windows on the lower level were topped by pediments with shell design. The southern and northern side doors had red marble frames decorated with crosses. A few old gravestones were set into the outer walls. The facades were enriched by the Neo-Baroque remodelling with new decorative elements like a heavy cornice and the railings of the balconets.

At the time of its construction, the church was located in a densely built-up neighbourhood. Like many other Serbian churches in Hungary, it was oriented differently from Catholic churches; before the 1780s, regulations prohibited Orthodox churches from opening directly onto the street, and their walls had to be set back from the property line. As a result, it faced away from the surrounding streets, with access on the western side from an enclosed churchyard. By the mid-19th century, this space was bordered by the Serbian parish house, a cast-iron fence along Görög utca, and a high brick wall to the south. Along the south side of the church, which faced Templom tér, lay a narrow, tree-lined garden. Only in the final decades of the 19th century did the dense urban grain of the area begin to break up; it was finally cleared in the 1930s, leaving the church as a solitary building in a park.

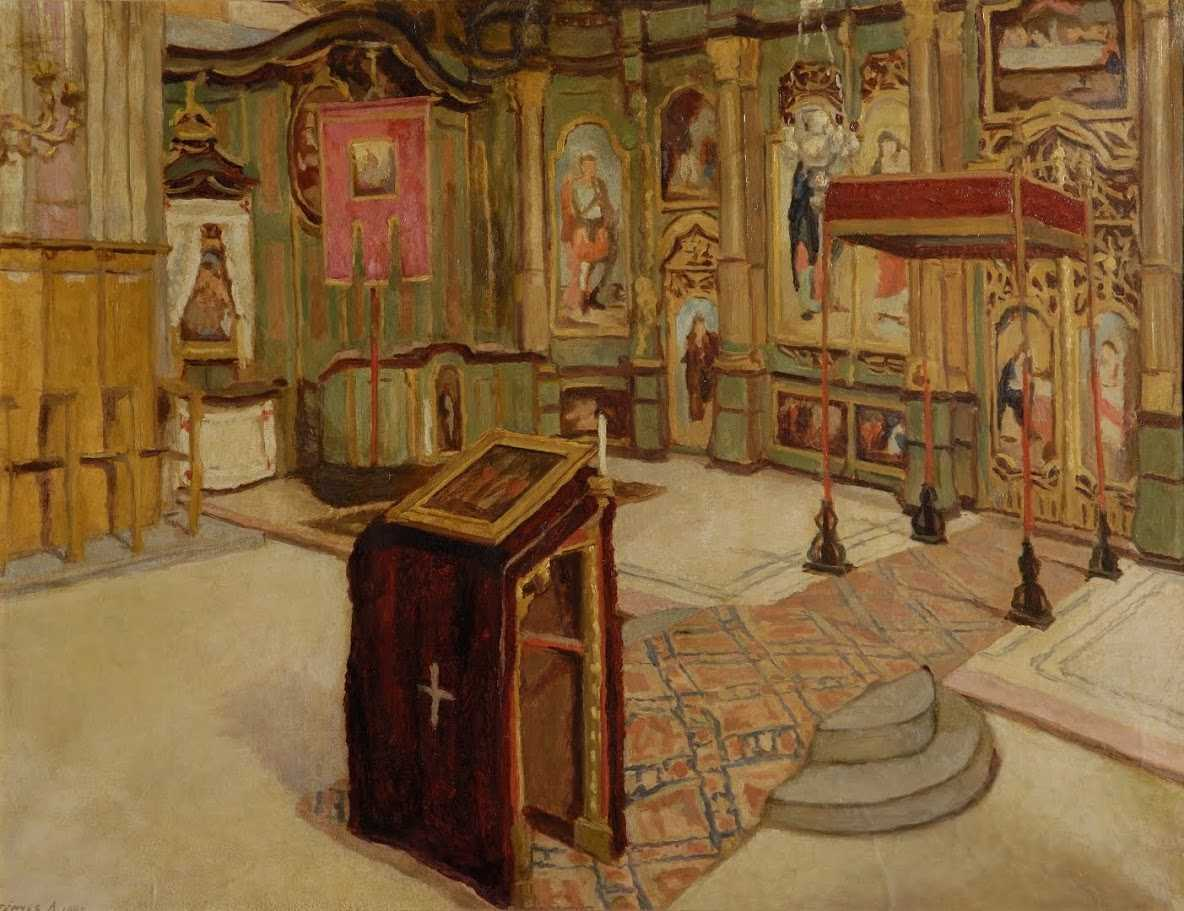
Interior of the church, painting by Adolf Fényes (1909)

Interior: The nave of the cathedral was three bays long, covered with Baroque Bohemian vaults, ending with a shallow apse in the east and a preceded by a vaulted narthex on the west. The double transverse arches sprung from pairs of Corinthian half pillars which had elaborate capitals decorated with festoons. The projecting cornice was strongly articulated. The organ loft above the western narthex opened to the nave by a large triumphal arch. A similar arch on the sanctuary side framed the iconostasis which dominated the view of the interior.

The vault was decorated with frescos. In the first bay in front of the iconostasis there was God the Father standing on a celestial sphere raised by angels, and surrounded by the celestial forces arranged in nine groups. In the corners, the four evangelists were presented, together with their symbols: Matthew with an angel and Mark with a lion at his feet (northern side); John with an eagle and Luke in front of an easel, with the icon of the Virgin on it (the southern side). This was painted by Arsenije Teodorović in 1818, and the composition was similar to his previous work in the Almaška Church in Novi Sad.

== Iconostasis ==
The unusually large dimensions of the building presented a challenge to create a suitably large iconostasis separating the nave from the sanctuary. Due to financial difficulties the work only started a decade after the consecration of the church. On 16 July 1761 a contract was signed with Antonije Mihić, a woodcutter and carpenter from Pest. He not only created the high wooden frame of the iconostasis but also a pulpit, choir stalls on both sides of the altar for six persons, the archbishop's throne with a canopy, sixty stalls along the side walls and a tabernacle above the altar table. Mihić finished most of these works in the first half of 1764. The parish signed a contract with Vasilije Ostojić on 25 March 1764 to paint the icons.

The first iconostasis of the church is only known from descriptions but it seems that its conception strongly influenced the iconostasis of the Serbian Orthodox Cathedral in Szentendre, painted between 1777 and 1781. The co-cathedral in Buda certainly had an outstandingly representative Baroque interior suitable to its status as one of the most important churches in the Metropolitanate of Karlovci. However the Great Tabán Fire of 1810 destroyed the whole ensemble.

Second iconostasis

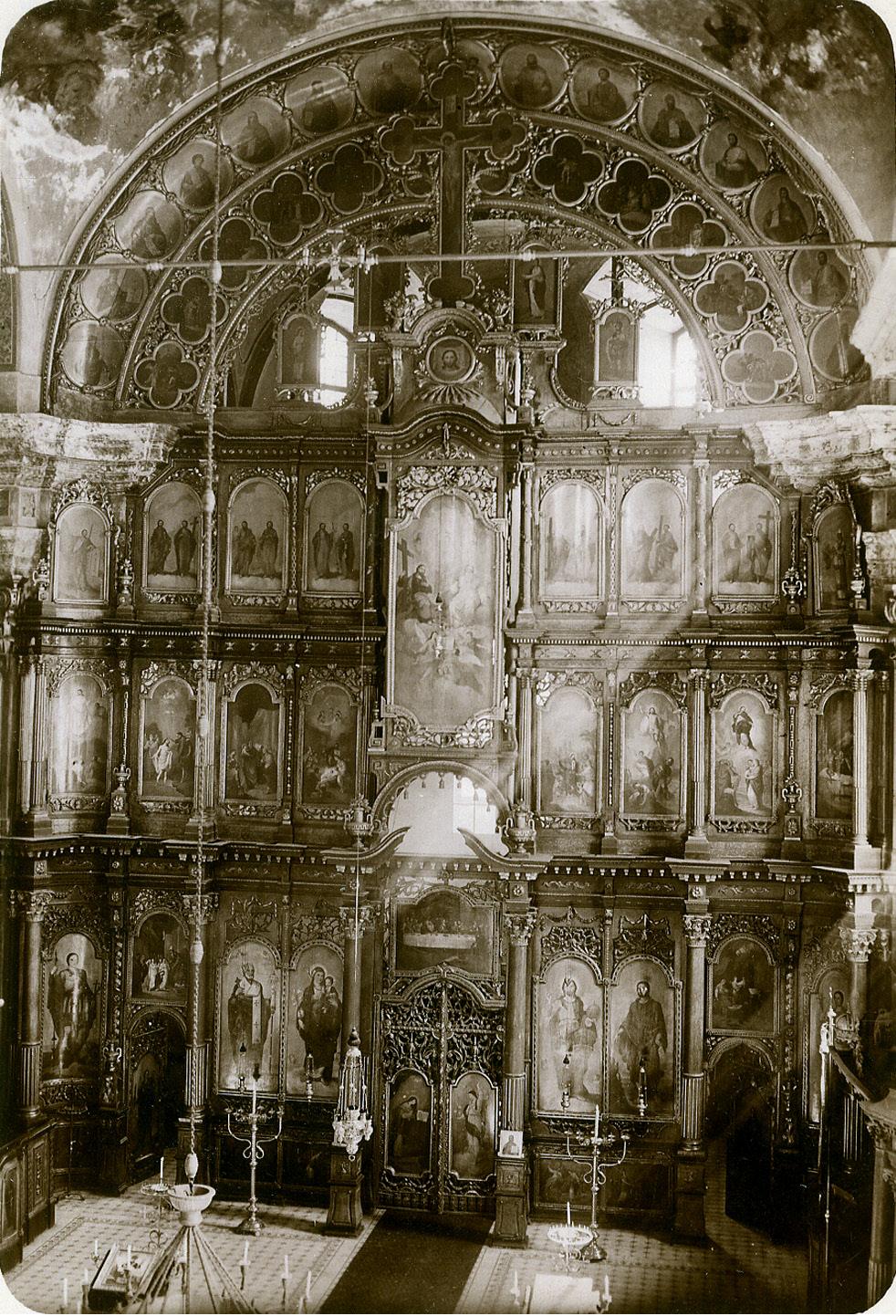
The iconostasis around 1935

The wood frame of the second iconostasis was installed in 1815 after the necessary repairs of the interior had been completed. It was created by Petar Padić, a woodcarver from Eger who received the job in 1813 for 6,000 forints. Following the recommendation of the priest, Jovan Vitković, the parish board made a contract with Arsenije Teodorović on 28 May 1817 to paint 68 icons for the iconostasis and to gild their frames, together with the ornaments. He was commissioned to marble paint the proskomedia and the altar space and decorate its walls with three paintings. The first vault in front of the iconostasis was to be painted with a representation of God the Father in Majesty and the nine angelic orders. Two choir stalls were to be gilded and decorated with an icon painted on each of them. These works should have been executed "with diligent labor and all kinds of experience and skill of indefatigable care" within two years from May 1818. His remuneration was 9,000 forints in silver coins, and lodging was provided in Buda and 288 gallons of vine.

Teodorović was a renowned painter from Novi Sad who received his artistic education in the Academy of Fine Arts Vienna and worked in a refined Classicist style. He painted many iconostases for the Serbian Orthodox communities of the Habsburg Empire. This time he applied for the job at Jovan Vitković in a letter dated 10 April 1816 and enjoyed the confidence of both Bishop Dionisije Popović and Metropolitan Stefan Stratimirović. He has also known the Vitković family from Eger where he worked on the iconostasis in 1801.

In the end, Teodorović only began to work in August 1818 and finished the larger part of the iconostasis by September 1820. A few icons were made later in his workshop in Novi Sad, and sent to Buda during the course of 1821. The contract was ended on 23 September 1821. Although he was supposed to paint the icons "with his own hands", this was an unrealistic expectation on part of the parish because Teodorović worked with many assistants, and the less important details, the gilding and the background of the paintings were always entrusted to them.

The Buda iconostasis belonged to the group of tall, richly decorated, Ukrainian-type partition screens that appeared in the Metropolitanate of Karlovci in the middle of the 18th century. The icons on the two ends and the medallions of the highest zone were concave, creating an illusionistic impression that the iconostasis extended into the space of the observer. As regards the paintings, the lack of Baroque gestures and the calmness of their style reveals the artist's aspiration towards classical simplicity. Teodorović used engravings and woodcuts of Western artists from prayer books, illustrated Bibles and painter's pattern books as models for his compositions. The icons were arranged in four zones separated by horizontal beams: the Sovereign tier (with additional icons above the lintels of the doors and on the socle), the tier of Feasts, the tier of the Apostles and the great cross surrounded with two rows of medallions depicting scenes from the Passion of Christ and half-length figures of the prophets. The arrangement of icons and the program of the iconostasis focused on the most important topics of Serbian Orthodox theology in the 18th century: God's incarnation and redemption through Christ's sacrifice. The basic structure and the arrangement of the icons was almost identical to Teodorović's previous work, the iconostasis of the Church of the Holy Virgin in Zemun.

The icons

The choice and arrangement of the icons was traditional with a few deviations. The place to the left of the Mother of God is usually dedicated to the Patronal Saint or Feast but this was replaced by an icon of Saint Nicholas. The icon of the Holy Trinity was located instead in the middle of the iconostasis in the form of a large central painting. The celestial figures of Christ, the Theotokos, Archangel Michael and Gabriel are standing on clouds while the saints were shown in real, earthly space. The small icons on the socle were narratively and symbolically connected to the icons of the Sovereign tier: under the icon of Jesus Christ there was an episode from his life, the meeting with the Samaritan woman at the well; under John the Baptist his beheading was depicted. The presence of the Old Testament prophets of Moses and Aaron the tier of the Apostles is somewhat unusual. They illustrated the idea of the high priesthood that began with them, and continued through the apostles who founded the first Christian communities, and appointed the first bishops.

After the demolition of the church, the icons and a few pieces of the wood frame were preserved by the Eparchy of Buda. From 2012 to 2017 the icons were restored, documented and researched for the first time since the dismantling of the screen. The scientific project was a cooperation between the Museum of Serbian Church Art in Szentendre, the Gallery of Matica Srpska in Novi Sad and the Provincial Institute for the Protection of Cultural Monuments.

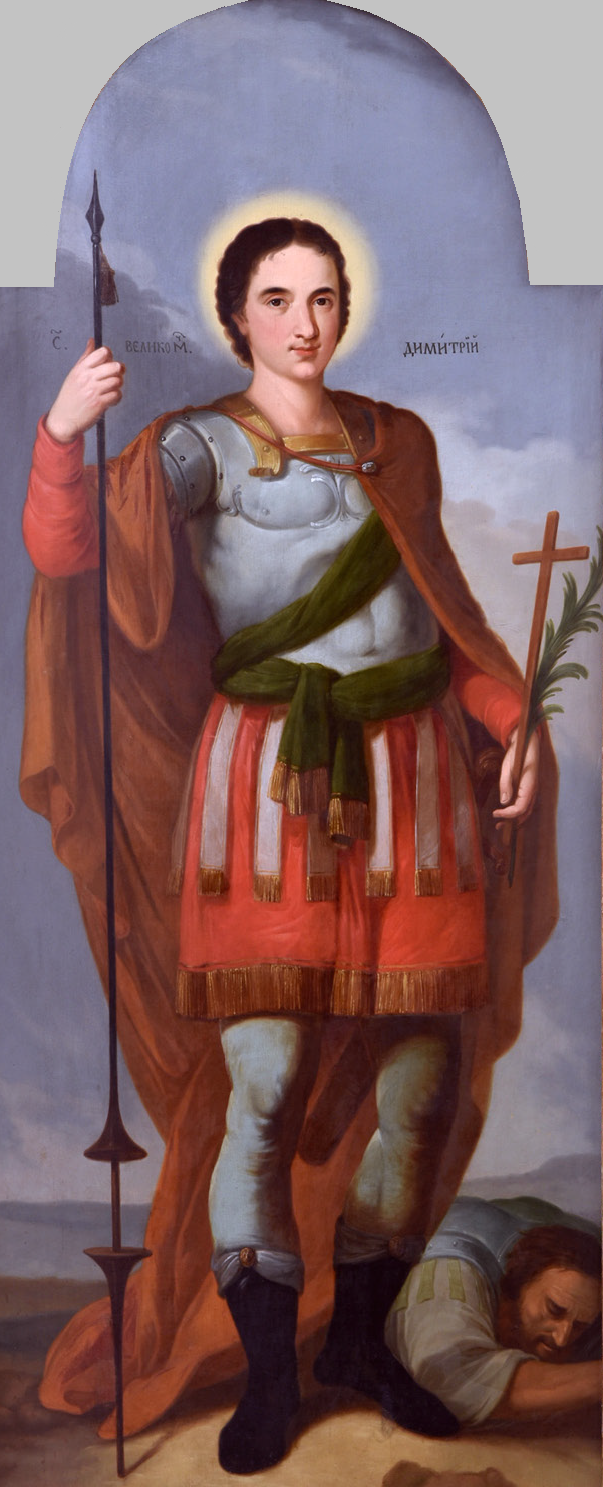
The icon of Saint Demetrius with the slain Lyaeus at his feet from the iconostasis of the church

Socle (from left to right):

1. Prophet Daniel in the lions' den
2. The deliverance of Agrikov's son by Saint Nicholas
3. Visitation
4. Jesus and the Samaritan woman
5. Beheading of St. John
6. Three young men in the fiery furnace

Royal doors:

- Annunciation

Side doors:

- Holy Archangel Michael (north)
- Holy Archdeacon Stephen (south)

Sovereign tier (from left to right):

1. Saint Demetrius
2. Saint Nicholas
3. Theotokos
4. Jesus Christ
5. John the Baptist
6. Saint George

Above the lintels:

- Last Supper (above the Royal doors)
- The Entry of the Most Holy Theotokos into the Temple (above the north door)
- Birth of the Theotokos (above the south door)

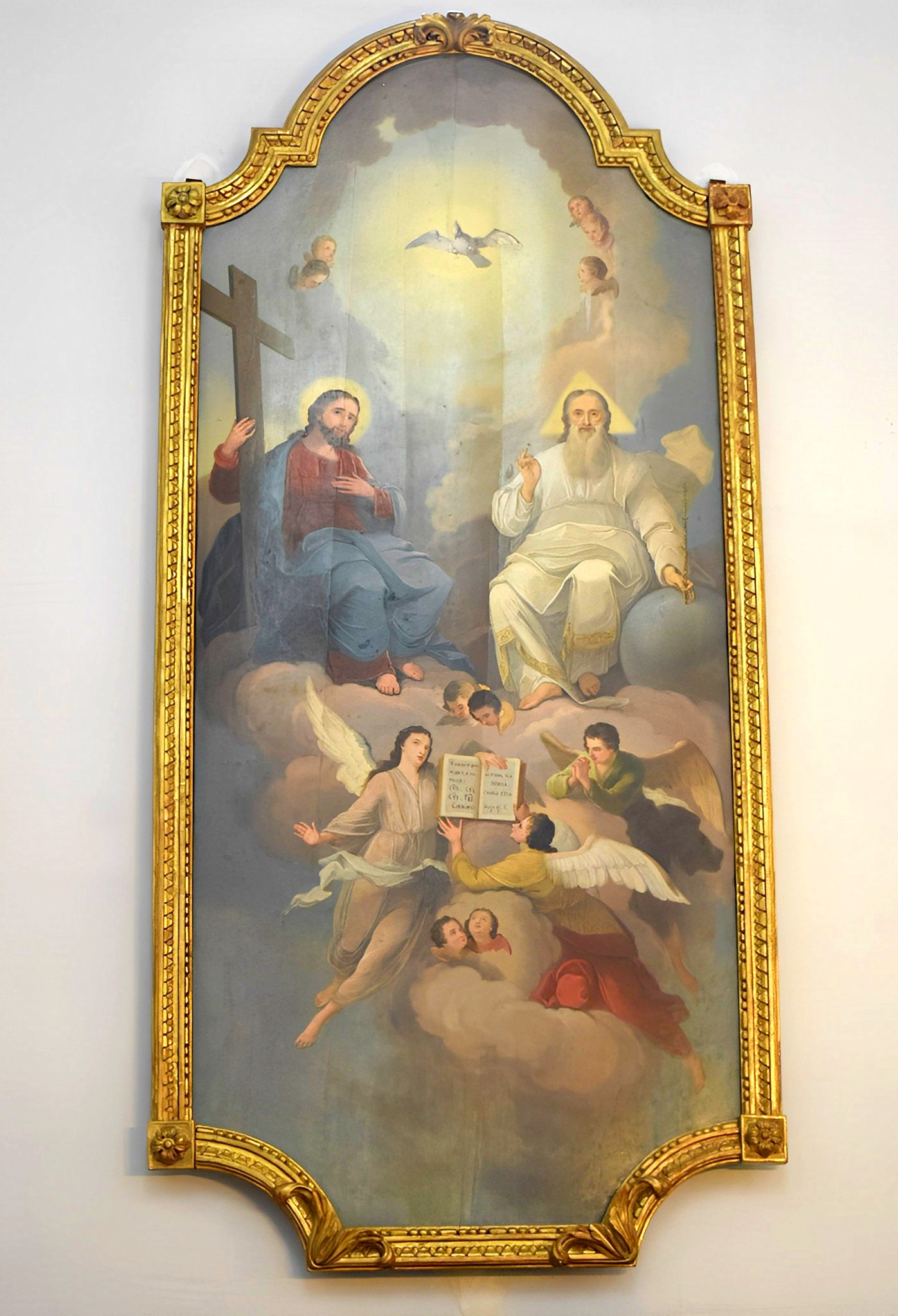
The Holy Trinity with angels

Feasts tier (from left to right):

1. The Transfiguration of Christ
2. The Baptism of Christ
3. Feast of the Presentation of Jesus at the Temple
4. The Nativity
5. Triumphal entry into Jerusalem
6. The Resurrection of Christ
7. The Ascension of Christ
8. The Assumption of the Virgin

Large central painting (above the Royal doors):

- The Holy Trinity with angels

Tier of the Apostles (from left to right):

1. Holy Prophet Moses
2. Holy Apostles Matthias and Simon
3. Holy Apostles Matthew and Bartholomew
4. Holy Apostles James and Thomas
5. Holy Apostles Peter and Paul
6. Holy Apostles Andrew and Philip
7. Holy Apostles Judas and James
8. Holy Prophet Aaron

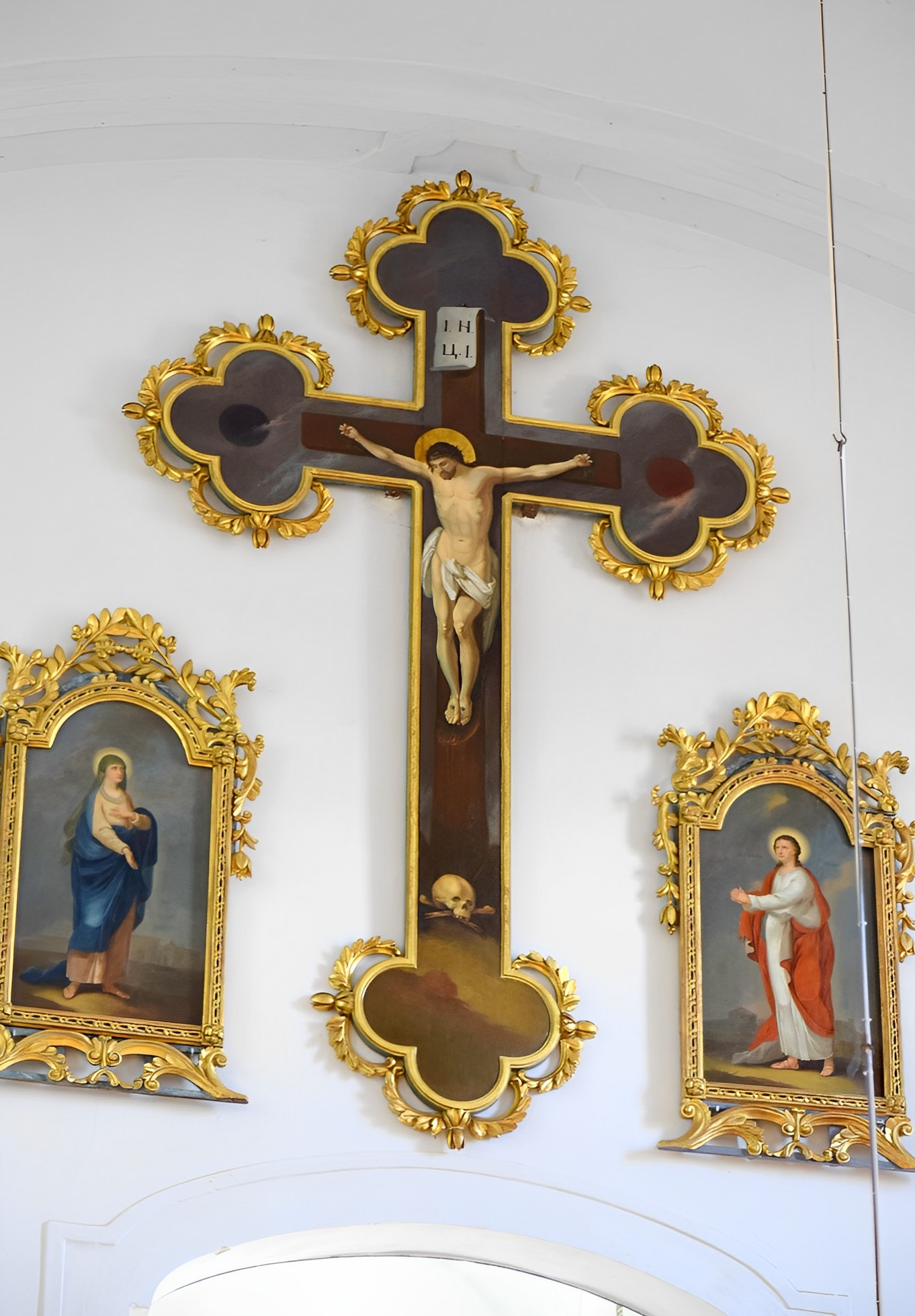
The Great Cross

The Great Cross:

- The crucifixion of Christ

Around the Great Cross:

- Theotokos (first painting left)
- Saint John (first painting right)
- Mary Magdalene (second painting left)
- Saint Longinus (second painting right)
- Image of the Saviour Made Without Hands (under the Great Cross)

Inner row of medallions (from left to right):

Agony in the Garden, Arrest of Jesus, Christ before Annas, Christ before Caiaphas, Christ before Herod, Christ before Pilate, Pilate Washing his Hands, Flagellation of Christ, The Crowning with Thorns, Ecce Homo, The Way of the Cross (half of the painting was lost), Jesus Falls at the Cross

Outer row of medallions (from left to right):

Holy Prophet Isaiah, Holy Prophet Jeremiah, Holy Prophet Ezekiel, Holy Prophet Daniel, Holy Prophet Hosea, Holy Prophet Joel, Holy Prophet Amos, Holy prophets Obadiah and Jonah, Holy Prophet Micah, Holy Prophet Nahum, Holy Prophet Habakkuk, Holy Prophet Zephaniah, Holy Prophet Haggai, Holy Prophet Zechariah, Holy Prophet Malachi

Five more icons by Teodorović, that were not part of the iconostasis, also survived:

King David (backs of the northern choir stalls), St. John of Damascus (backs of the southern choir stall), Annunciation, Adoration of the Magi (Proskomedia), The Virgin and Child (the Virgin's throne)

The fronts of the choir stalls were also decorated with icons that depicted Saint Ignatius of Antioch (north) and Saint Romanos the Melodist (south). As they are not known today, as well as any documentation about them, it remains unknown whether they were painted by Teodorović. Unusually the pulpit, which had been destroyed by the fire, was not replaced after the reconstruction. The Eleusa icon on the Virgin's throne was signed by the painter: "Created by Arsenije Teodorović, painter and citizen of Novi Sad in 1820". The Serbs in Buda had great respect for this icon, as shown by the numerous votive offerings (silver thalers, ducats, jewels) mentioned in the church inventories.

== List of parish priests ==
- Petar Vitković (Péter Vitkovics) - 1803-1808
- Jovan Vitković (János Vitkovics) - 1808-1849
- Jovan Milikšić (János Miliksics) - until 1864
- Jeremija Mađarević (Jeremiás Magyarevics) - 1864-1896
- Velimir Nedeljkovic (Velimir Nedelykovits) - 1898-1936
- Dušan Vujičić (Dusán Vujicsics) - 1939-1949

== See also ==
- Eparchy of Buda
- Church of Saint George
- Nikola Tesla Serbian School
- Serbs of Hungary
