= Vasa Ostojić =

- Born: 1730; Sremski Karlovci, Military Frontier
- Died: 1791 (aged 60–61); Free Royal City of Novi Sad
- Known for: Painting

Vasa Ostojić or Vasilije Ostojić (Serbian Cyrillic: Васа/Василије Остојић; 1730–1791) was a Serbian Baroque painter of icons and frescoes.

== Life ==
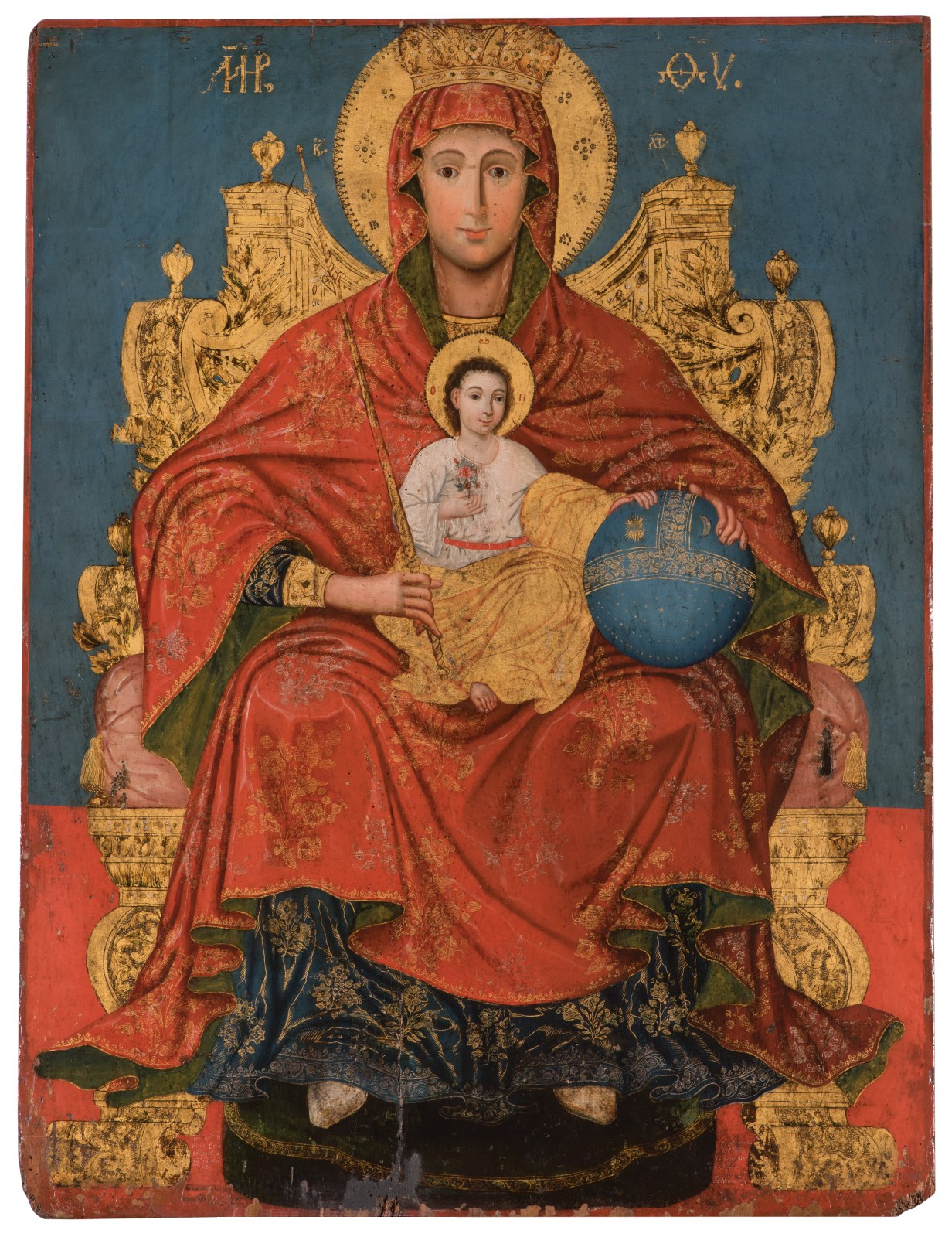
Virgin Mary with Christ, 1749

Ostojić was born in Sremski Karlovci, in the Habsburg Military Frontier in 1730.

He collaborated with monk-painter Amvrosije Jankovićon church projects in Sremski Karlovci. He was once Dimitrije Bačević's pupil and assistant.

His notable works include the Serbian Orthodox Church of the Assumption (Uspenska crkva) in Novi Sad, St. Nicholas in Irig and Neradin (1760), the iconostasis in the Orthodox church in Voganj and the iconostasis in the monastery church of Rakovac. Additionally, he created the iconostasis of the Church of Saint Demetrius in Buda (lost in the Great Tabán Fire of 1810), and most notably, the iconostasis in the Annunciation Church in Szentendre.

Ostojić was under the influences of Russian and Ukrainian Baroque masters.

Later in life, he was ennobled for his artistic achievements.

Ostojić died in Novi Sad in 1791.

== See also ==
- List of painters from Serbia
