= Rakovac Monastery =

Monastery in Serbia

Coordinates: 45°11′06″N 19°46′48″E

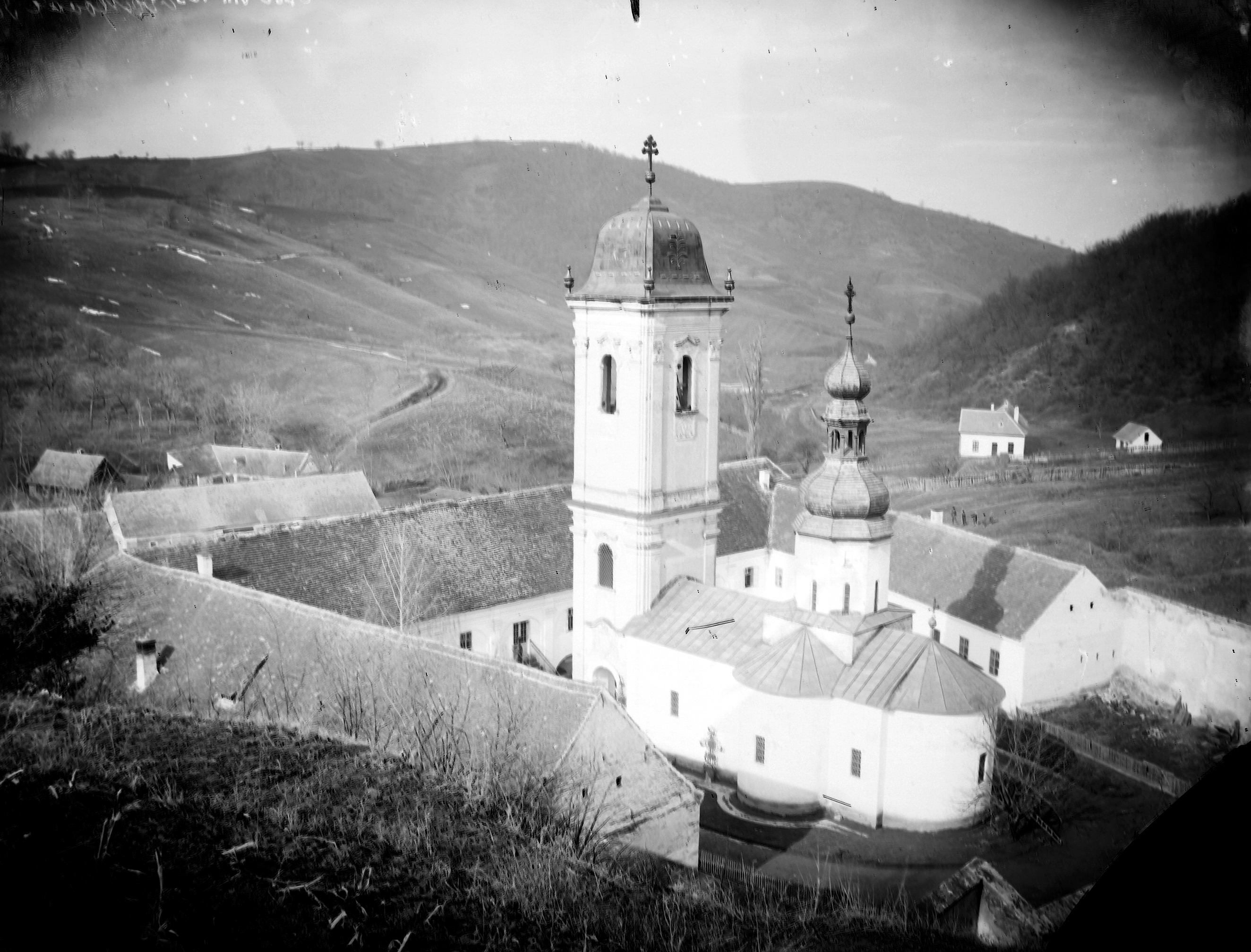
Rakovac monastery in 1885

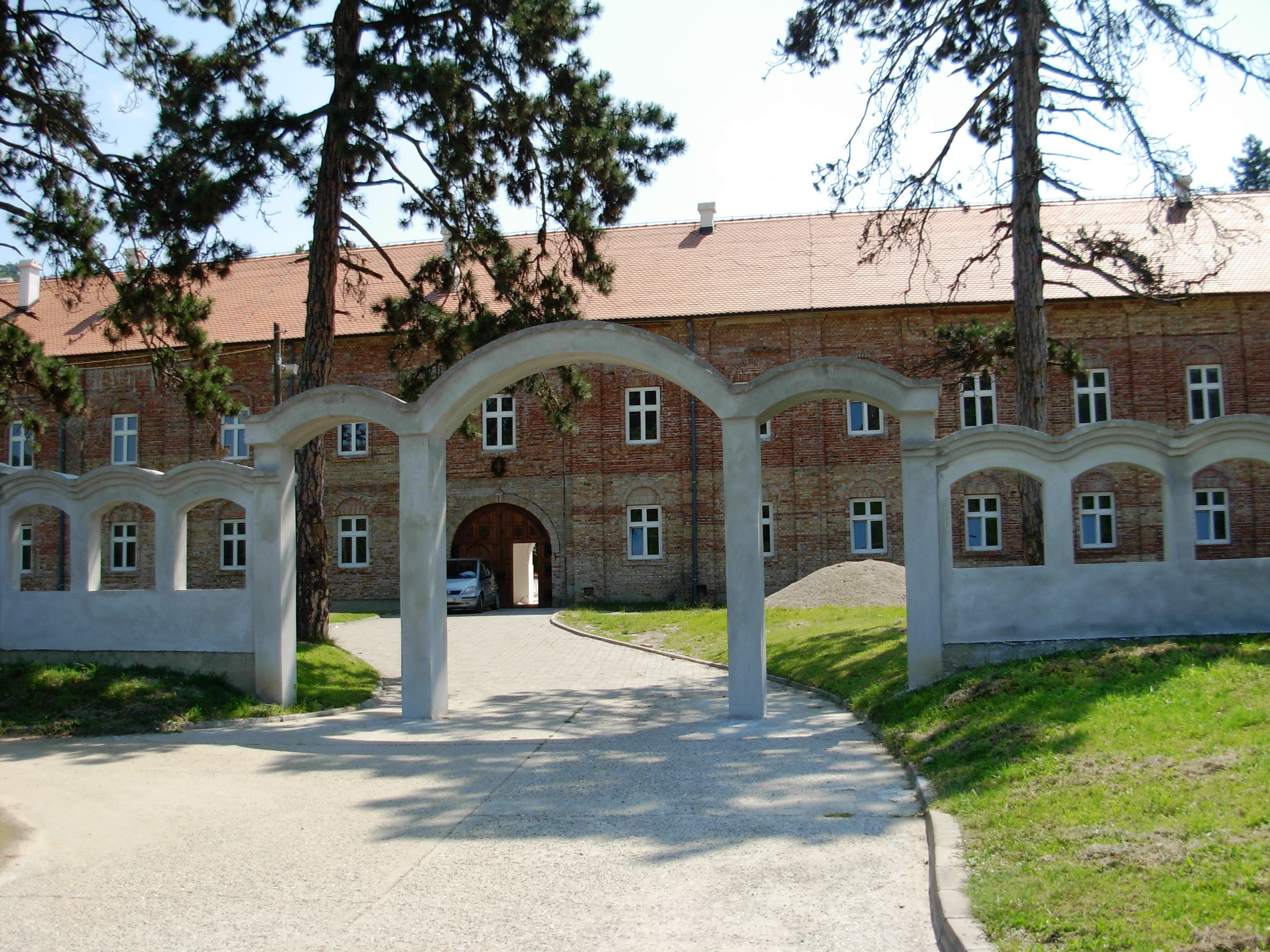
Rakovac monastery dormitory

The Rakovac Monastery (Serbian: Манастир Раковац, romanized: Manastir Rakovac) is a Serb Orthodox monastery on the Fruška Gora mountain in the northern Serbian province of Vojvodina. The monastery of Rakovac with its church dedicated to the Holy Healers Cosmas and Damian, as tradition has it, was founded by Raka Milošević, Chief Chamberlain to Despot Jovan Branković, according to a legend written in 1704. The legend states that Raka erected the monastery in 1498. The earliest historical records mentioning the monastery are dated to 1545–1546. Inside, there are fragments of the frescoes on the walls which date from the first half of the 16th century. The baroque bell-tower was adjoined in 1735, and the residential building gained its final, three-range shape in 1771. The icons on the baroque iconostasis were painted by Vasa Ostojić in 1763, while the wall paintings in the refectory are 1768 works of Amvrosije Janković.

Rakovac Monastery was declared Monument of Culture of Exceptional Importance in 1990, and it is protected by the state.

== See also ==
- List of Serbian Orthodox monasteries
