= Church of Saint George, Budapest =

Serbian Orthodox church in Budapest, Hungary

Church of Saint George
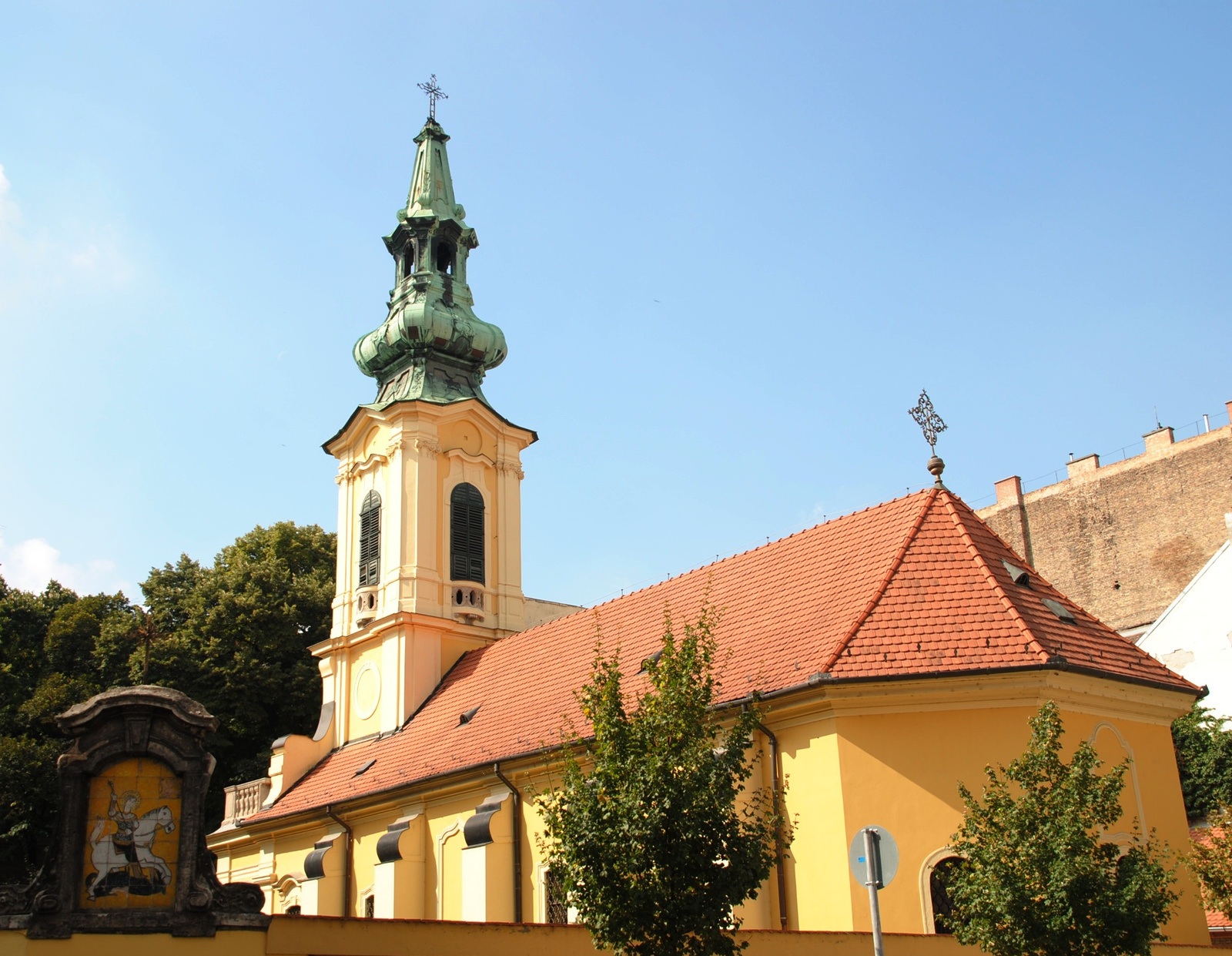
- Church of Saint George
- Church of Saint George
- 47°29′22″N 19°03′26″E
- Location: Budapest
- Country: Hungary
- Denomination: Serbian Orthodox

History
- Dedication: Saint George

Architecture
- Style: Baroque

Administration
- Archdiocese: Eparchy of Buda

The Saint George Church (Serbian: Црква Светог Ђорђа, romanized: Crkva Svetog Đorđa; Hungarian: Szent György Nagyvértanú szerb ortodox templom), commonly known as the Serbian Church, is an Eastern Orthodox church located in Budapest, Hungary. It is under jurisdiction of the Eparchy of Buda of the Serbian Orthodox Church and is nowadays the only Serbian Orthodox church in Hungarian capital.

It is located in the heart of the city, less than 100 meters from the Váci Street, the main pedestrian zone. The building is protected by the Hungarian National Office for Cultural Heritage.

== History ==
On the site of the current church, an older Serbian place of worship was built during the settlement of the Serbs in this area during the Ottoman Empire rule over the Ottoman Hungary in the 16th and 17th centuries. Some sources indicate that there was a Serbian place of worship at the same site even before the 1526 Battle of Mohács. 1655 source indicate that the church had a separate cemetery next to the Kecskemét Gate. In his travelogue from 1660 to 1664, Ottoman traveler Evliya Çelebi mentions that the Serbs in Pest had their own church. In 1685, the Habsburg Empire took over Hungary from the Ottomans with Serbian community remaining in the city but with the destruction of their church in 1686. During the 1690 Great Migrations of the Serbs local Serb community in the city increased significantly and in 1695 Habsburg authorities granted the permission for the construction of the new Church. In 1698, the church renovated by Patriarch Arsenije III Čarnojević.

In the first half of the 18th century, Serbs constituted a significant portion of the population in Pest, which led to the need for a larger and more solid church. Finally, in 1731, a project was prepared for a new church in the Baroque style, which was built in 1733. The church was built according to the plans of András Mayerhoffer (1690-1771) from Salzburg. The Baroque bell tower was added in 1752. The original iconostasis for the church was created by Stefan Tenecki.

In 1838, Pest was struck by a major flood, resulting in damage to the old iconostasis. Therefore, in 1850, the church received a new iconostasis in the spirit of Neo-Renaissance. The creator of the new iconostasis was a Greek artist. The baroque church's garden is surrounded by a stone wall, and on the side facing the garden, the tombstones of Serbian believers buried in Pest were incorporated. At the corner of Szerb Street and Veres Pálné Street, there is a ceramic image depicting St. George slaying the dragon.

The Church of St. George in Pest has been the second most significant church of the Serbian community in Budapest after the Church of Saint Demetrius. However, since the aforementioned church was heavily damaged during World War II, it was demolished in 1949. As a result, the church in Pest became the only Serbian place of worship in the city. 1959 archaeological research confirmed that the current building was built at the site of an older church.

== Gallery ==
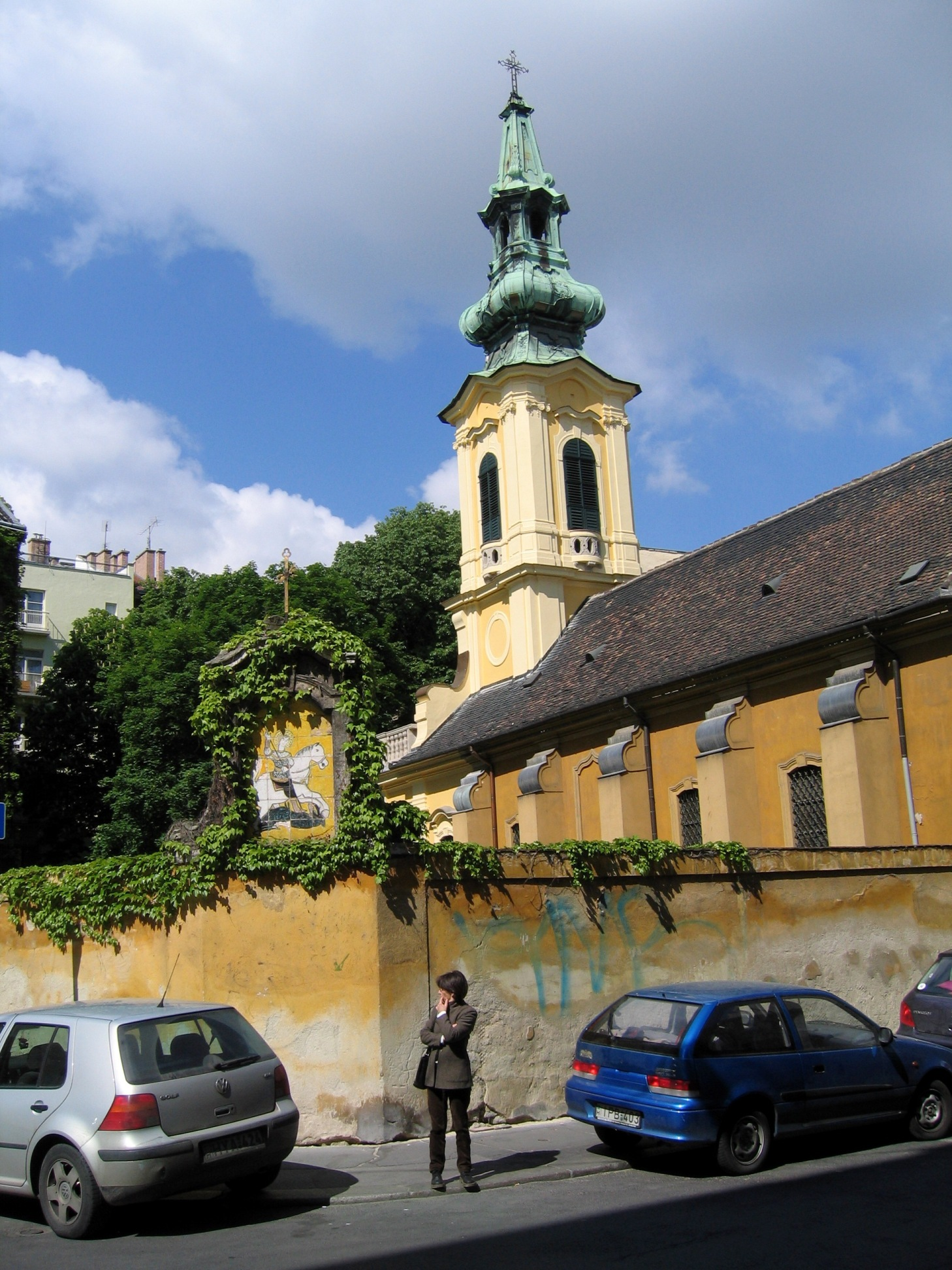
Szerb and Veres Pálné street corner

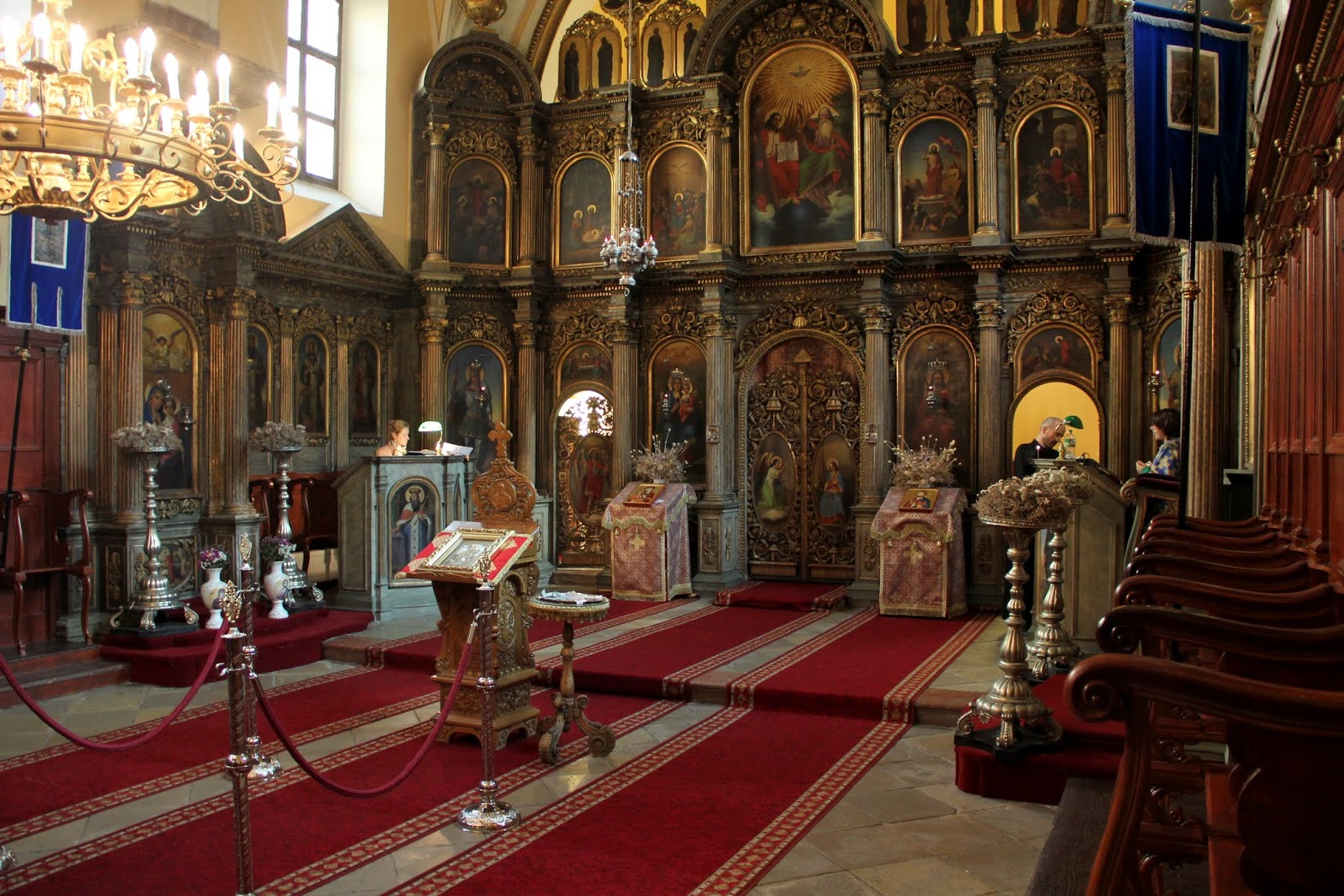
Iconostasis

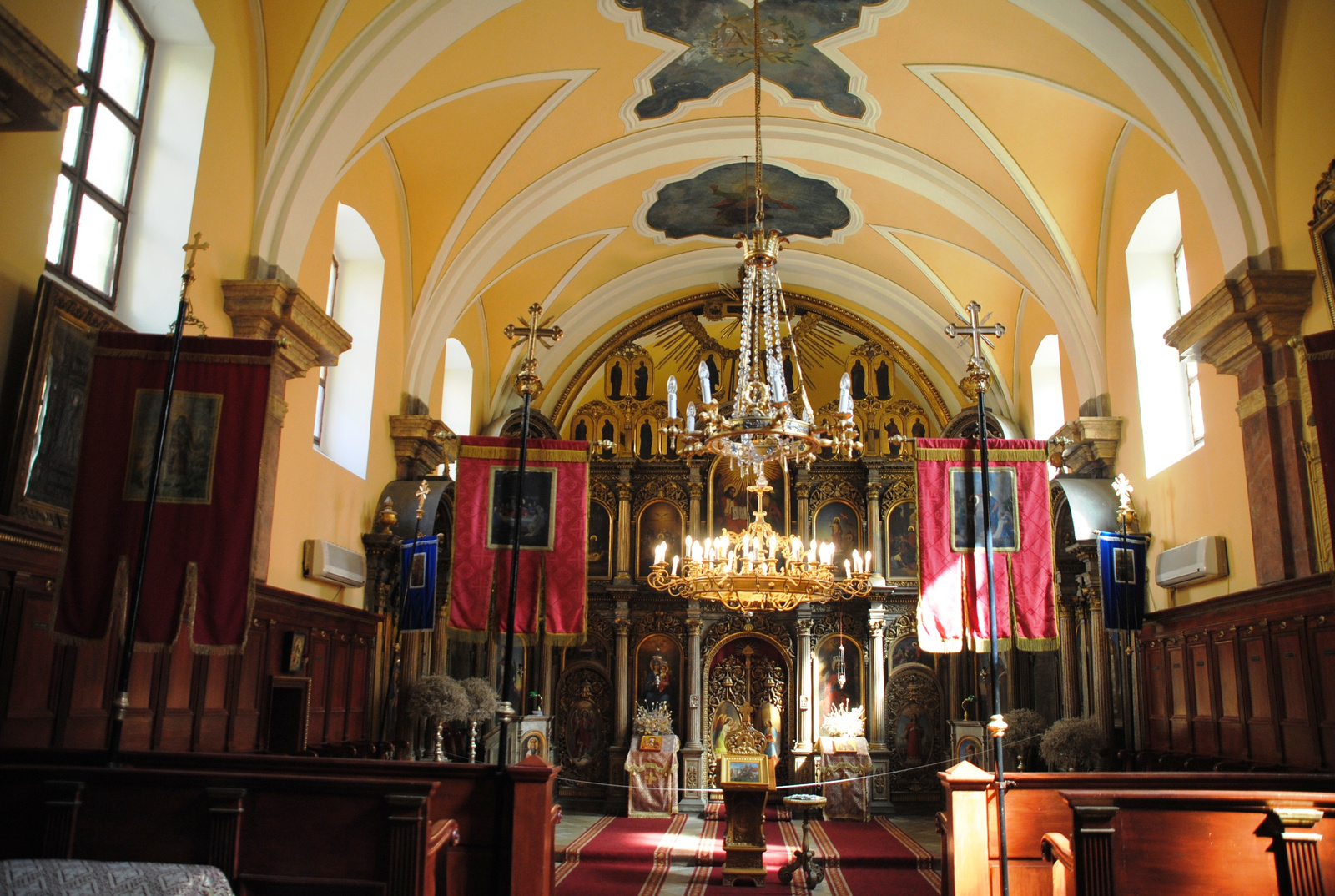
Interior

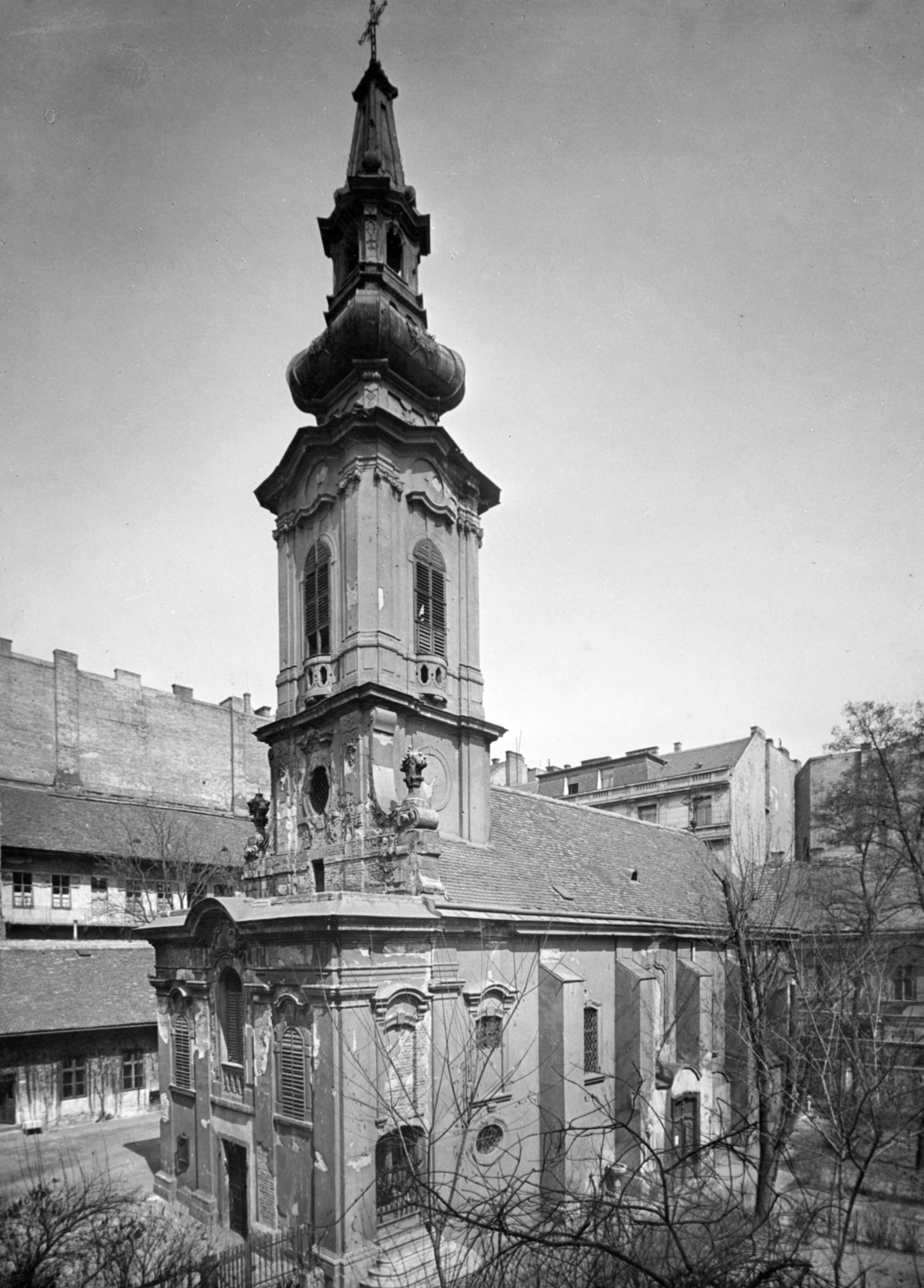
1954 image

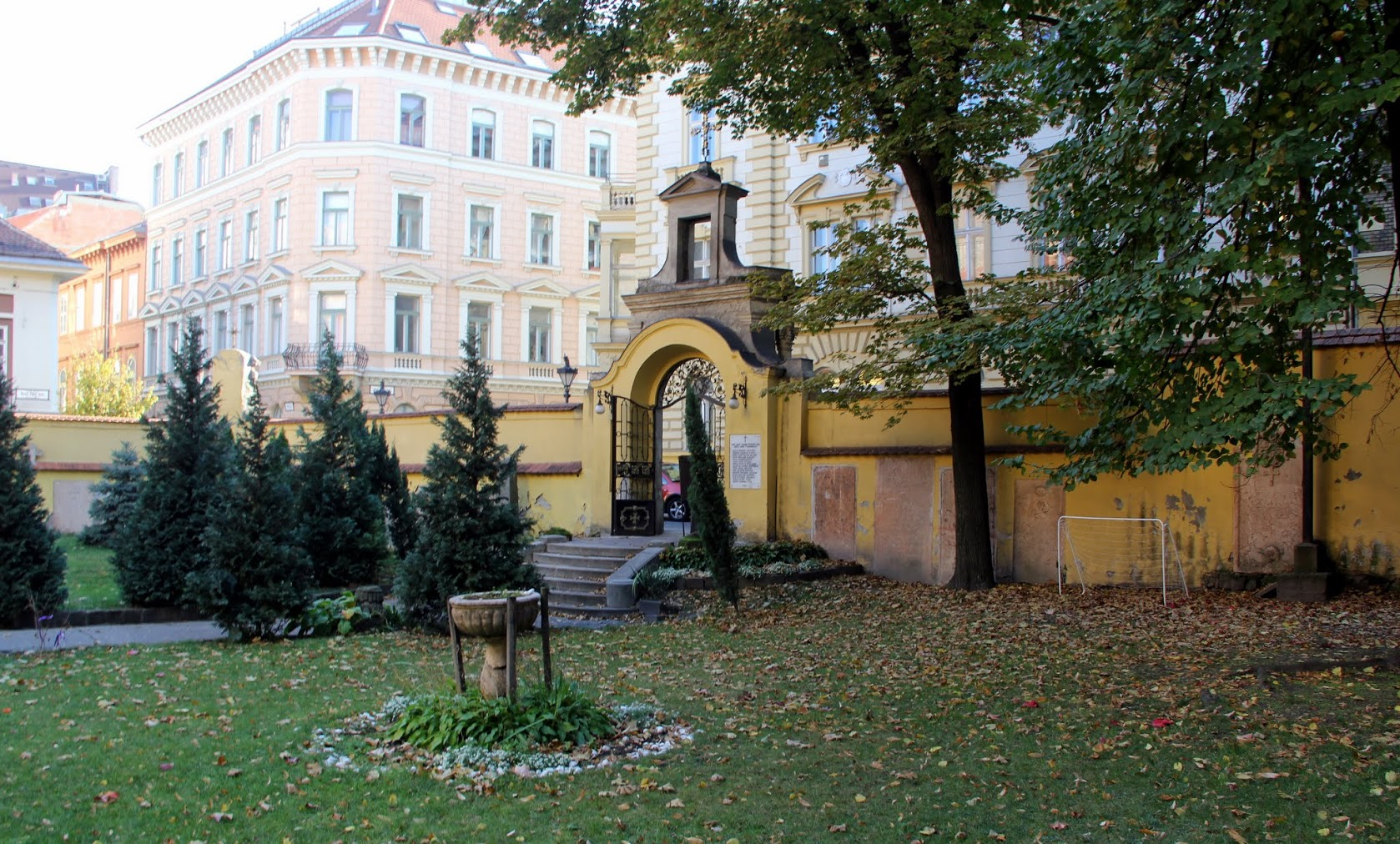
Garden

== See also ==
- Eparchy of Buda
- Church of Saint Demetrius
- Nikola Tesla Serbian School
- Serbs of Hungary
