= Tabán ruins =

Medieval ruins in Budapest, Hungary

- Tabáni romok (Hungarian)
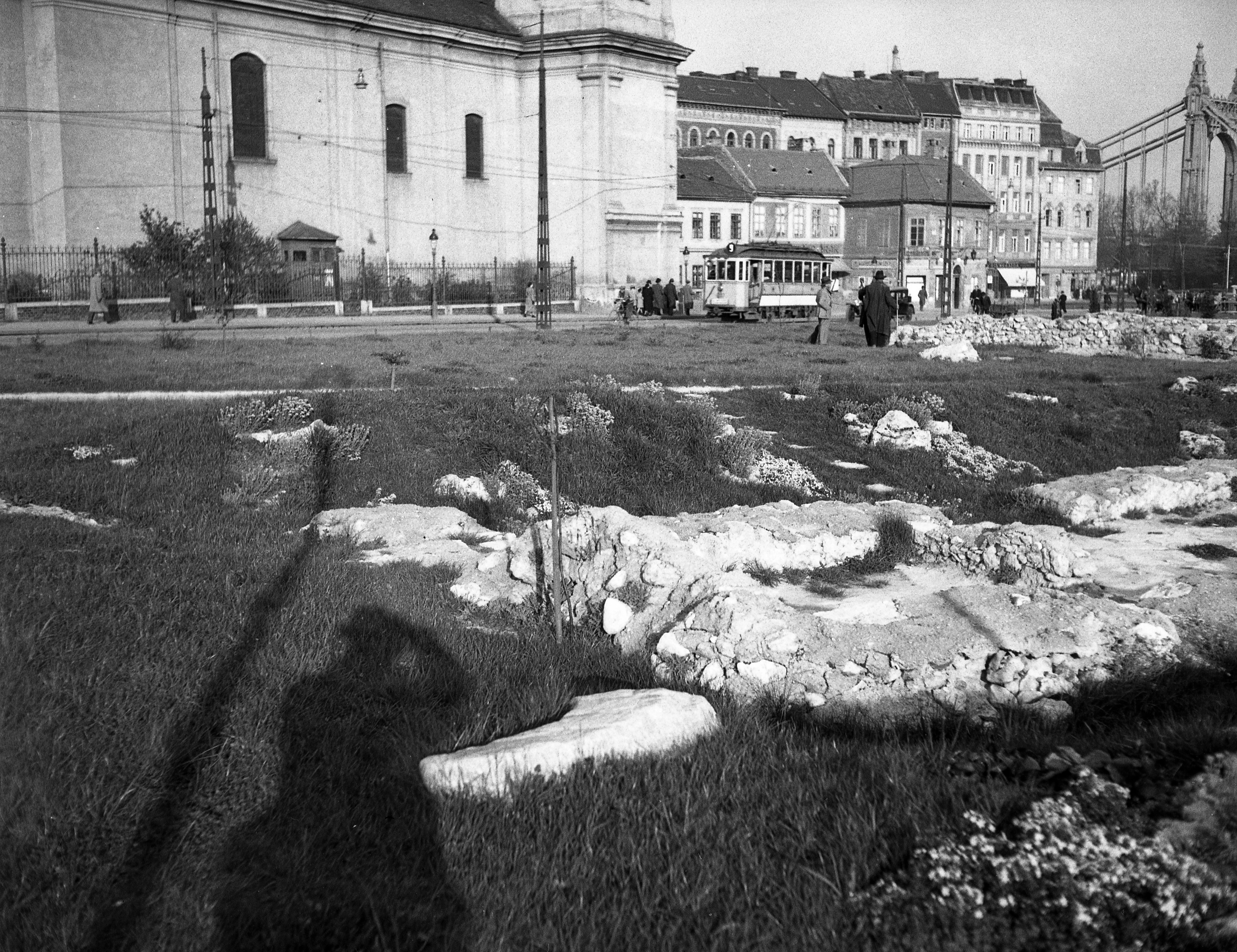
- The ruin of Building VI in 1938

- Location within Hungary
- 47°29′31″N 19°02′34″E
- Type: Watchtower, urban settlement
- Periods: Roman, Medieval
- Cultures: Roman, Medieval European
- Location: Budapest, Hungary

History
- Built: 4th century, 15th century

Site notes
- Material: stone
- Excavation dates: 1935-36
- Archaeologists: Lajos Nagy, Sándor Garády
- Condition: Partially destroyed
- Owner: Public
- Public access: Yes
- Now is the site of the Tabán Park

The Tabán ruins (Hungarian: tabáni romok) are a group of medieval ruins in Budapest, Hungary. They are located in District I, in the Tabán neighbourhood, between Szarvas tér and Krisztina körút. The scattered ruins officially belong to one listed monument (ID 67). The remains of the mainly medieval structures were discovered in 1936 by archaeologists after the demolition of a large part of the densely built Tabán quarter but significant parts of them disappeared in the 1960s when the whole area was restructured. A 15th-century building, named Building I, and a retaining wall by the Ördög-árok stream are still visible above ground.

== Discovery ==
The central part of the old Tabán district was demolished by the municipality of Budapest in 1933-34, and a large new park was created on the freed-up area between Szebeny Antal (now Szarvas) tér, Attila körút and the slopes of Gellért Hill and Naphegy. The municipal office commissioned archaeologist Lajos Nagy to carry out archaeological surveys during the demolition works. However the scope of these surveys was limited and the results were sporadic. In 1934 the researchers were only allowed to work in the cellars of the buildings at no. 54-60 Attila körút which were set to be demolished. In 1935 a more extensive area was excavated between Szebeny Antal tér, Görög utca, Fehérsas utca and Virág Benedek utca. Although this area was thoroughly researched, it had been densely built over in the previous centuries, and the findings were confined to the courtyards of the former buildings giving only a patchy picture. Smaller surveys were also conducted on Fehérsas tér and Kereszt tér. The only built structure that came to light was the wall of a 4th-century Roman watchtower.

The newly established Fővárosi Régészeti és Ásatási Intézet (Municipal Institute of Archaeology) carried on the research in roughly the same area between 29 May and 19 November 1936. A small hill was levelled, and the remains of six medieval structures were discovered by archaeologist Sándor Garády.

== The archaeological park ==
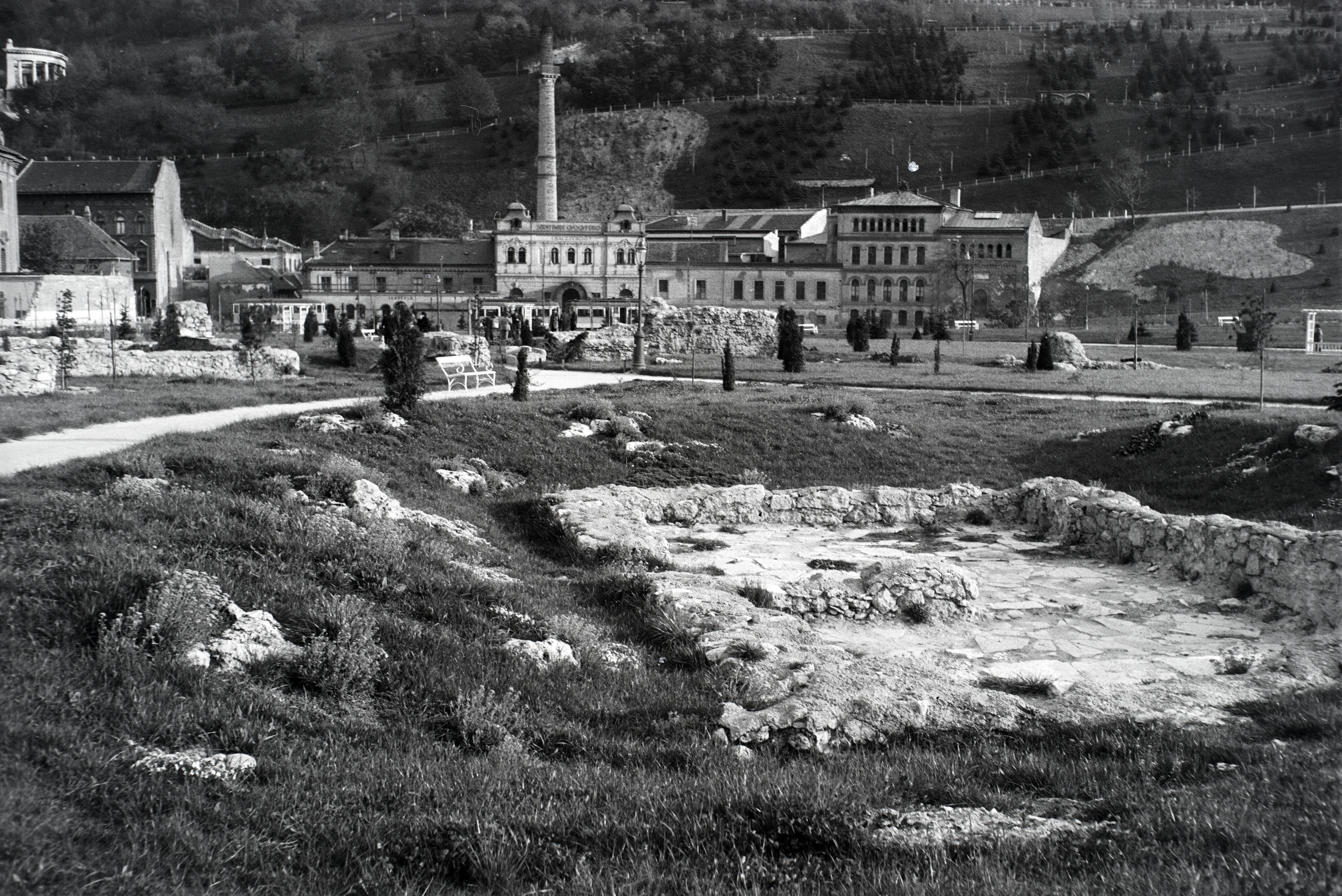
The archaeological park in 1938 with the ruins of Building VI in the foreground

After the discovery of the medieval structures a committee was formed to make a decision about the preservation of the ruins. Its members, Chief Notary László Garancsy, art historian István Genthon, historian Jenő Horváth, archaeologist Lajos Nagy and three municipal clerks visited the ongoing excavations on 23 July 1936. The landscaping experts supported the proposal to preserve the ruins, and incorporate them into the design of the new park. Lajos Nagy put forward the idea that an archaeological park can also serve as a tourist attraction. The discoveries were presented to the media, although the ruins were still incorrectly identified as "royal baths from the time of King Sigismund of Luxembourg or King Matthias Corvinus". Conservation works began in September 1936, and the archaeological park was certainly completed by the summer of 1938 as part of the new Tabán Park.

During the Siege of Budapest in 1944-45 the Tabán area was the scene of heavy fighting, and the landscaping was destroyed. The ruins themselves survived the war for the most part. The archaeological park was still in existence in 1960, but the whole area between Szarvas tér and the foot of Gellért Hill was completely restructured when the new Elisabeth Bridge was built. In 1962 new roads, tramway tracks and a traffic interchange was built covering large swathes of the Tabán Park with tarmac. The most important medieval structure, Building I was partially spared but several other structures were demolished. Now only three remains are visible: Building I, a short section of a wall and the half-buried retaining wall by the Ördög-árok stream.

== Watchtower of Frigeridus ==
At the time of the Roman conquest the small hill by the ford of the Danube was occupied by a settlement of the Eravisci tribe which survived until the end of the 1st century AD. A refuse pit from the Roman era indicated that probably a statio of the Pannonian Limes was established by the conquerors, and remained in use between c. 80 and 150. The northern slopes of Gellért Hill above the Tabán valley were probably covered with vineyards. The only built structure from the Roman era that was discovered is a late 4th century watchtower. The discovery was made in 1934 when a large house between Attila körút, Görög utca and Fehérsas utca was demolished (no. 43 Attila körút). Unfortunately, the heritage expert who was called to scene, Ottó Szőnyi pronounced it an "unremarkable medieval stone structure", and the workmen destroyed it with great effort and difficulty. Archaeologist Lajos Nagy was only able to recover a short section of the wall and several foundation pile holes in 1935-36. (Two 19th-century cellars were dug into the foundations and their arches survived, rather strangely, under the Roman wall.)

The watchtower (burgus) was probably similar to the tower at Csillaghegy or Budakalász. It was a rectangular stone structure (with c. 20–25 m long sides), surrounded by a vallum (ditch). The walls were thick and the foundation piles were necessary due to the marshy conditions near the river. Several pieces of bricks with stamps were recovered providing proof that the watchtower was built in 374-374 by Frigeridus dux, the military commander of Pannonia Valeria under Valentinian I. The inscription on the stamps read: FRIGERIDUS V(ir) P(erfectissimus) DUX AP(paratu) L(uci) LUPI. His predecessor, Terentius dux was also named on a brick stamp.

The Tabán burgus was built at a time when the Pannonian Limes was strengthened and many new fortifications were erected by Valentinian I against the Quadi who had attacked the Roman province. The date of its abandonment and destruction is unknown but a large part of its walls were still standing at the time of the discovery.

== Medieval structures ==
The Tabán valley and the hill by the ford was continuously inhabited during the Middle Ages although its urban topography remains unclear. The settlement was called minor or parvus Pest ("kis Pest") and Kelenföld (Creynfeld, Krenfeld). The excavations in 1936 unearthed a few stone buildings but their function and urban context is uncertain.

Building I

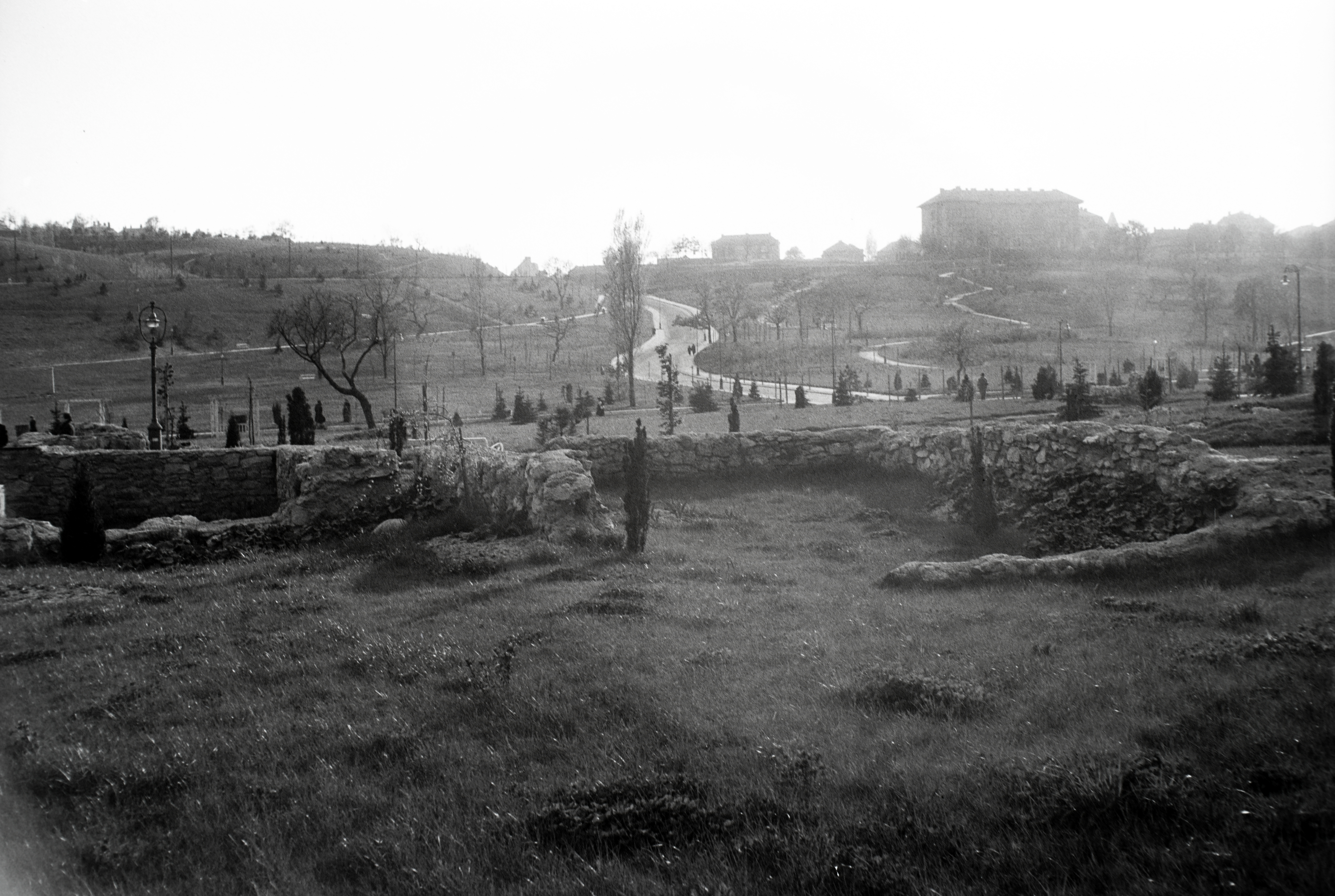
The conserved ruins of Building II és III in 1938.

The most important structure was an oblong-shaped building (24.3 by 7.35 m) with one meter thick walls, two large openings in the longer sides and a door in the northern side. The space was certainly vaulted because traces of two piers and a Late Gothic impost survived on the western side while another impost and pieces of ribs, jambs, tracery, fragments of two stone basins, two green stove tiles (depicting Saint George) and a maiolica floor tile (depicting a draw well) were also discovered in the rubble. The stone architectural fragments were painted red, white, green and black. Supposedly the building was one- or two-storey high and built in the 15th century. The room was probably a vaulted cellar and the door in the northern wall led to an underground corridor and another vaulted cellar (Building V). Later the room was divided by an irregular partition wall pierced by a very small window and a low, arched doorway. Sándor Garády assumed that the building had a defensive function or it was part of the royal gardens known from contemporary sources. In the Ottoman era the building was converted to a slaughterhouse or a butcher shop. Another vaulted cellar and an underground corridor was found to the west of this structure. The famous Mélypince restaurant was located above this structure before its demolition in 1933. The ruins of Building I were truncated in 1962 by the new tramway tracks but they are still visible.

Building II

A slightly trapezoid-shaped cellar (10.85 by 6.85 m) with doors opening in the eastern and the western sides, the latter leading to an underground corridor. The doors had slightly pointed arches; jambs, floor tiles and other architectural fragments indicated that this building also had an upper storey (or storeys). It was probably built in the first half of the 15th century, Garády assumed that it had a defensive function.

Building III

A smaller rectangular building immediately north to Building II. Because the walls were only 0.55 thick, it was certainly a single-floor structure. Both Building II and III were conserved in 1937 but their remains were demolished in 1962. They were located next to the Roman watchtower, between Attila körút and Görög utca.

Building IV

A complex structure located to the northeast of Building I. Its layout remains unclear because only short sections of its walls were excavated but the building was probably less important.

Building VI

An oblong-shaped building (8.95 by 4.48 m) to the north of Building II and III, later divided by a thin partition wall. Both rooms had stone floors and they had separate entrances, Garády assumed that they were shops. Three steps led down into the northern room. The building was probably connected to another in the northeast. The ruins were conserved in 1937 but they were demolished in 1962.

Retaining wall

This medieval ashlar wall was found in Árok utca and followed the outline of the later city block between Árok and Szarvas Gábor utca. Árok utca was established when the Ördög-árok stream was vaulted over in 1876, and the ashlar construction was a retaining wall or a stone embankment of the flood-prone little river. The remains of a bridgehead proved that at least one bridge crossed the stream here. The wall consisted of two straight sections (24.35 and 8.33 m long) with rectangular continuations on both ends (the southern one was truncated at 3 m, the northern one was 7.75 m long with another 9.3 m long connecting section running to the east). The structure was built of Hárshegy sandstone blocks. A significant part of the wall was conserved but now the remains are buried in a shallow depression by Krisztina körút.

== Gallery ==
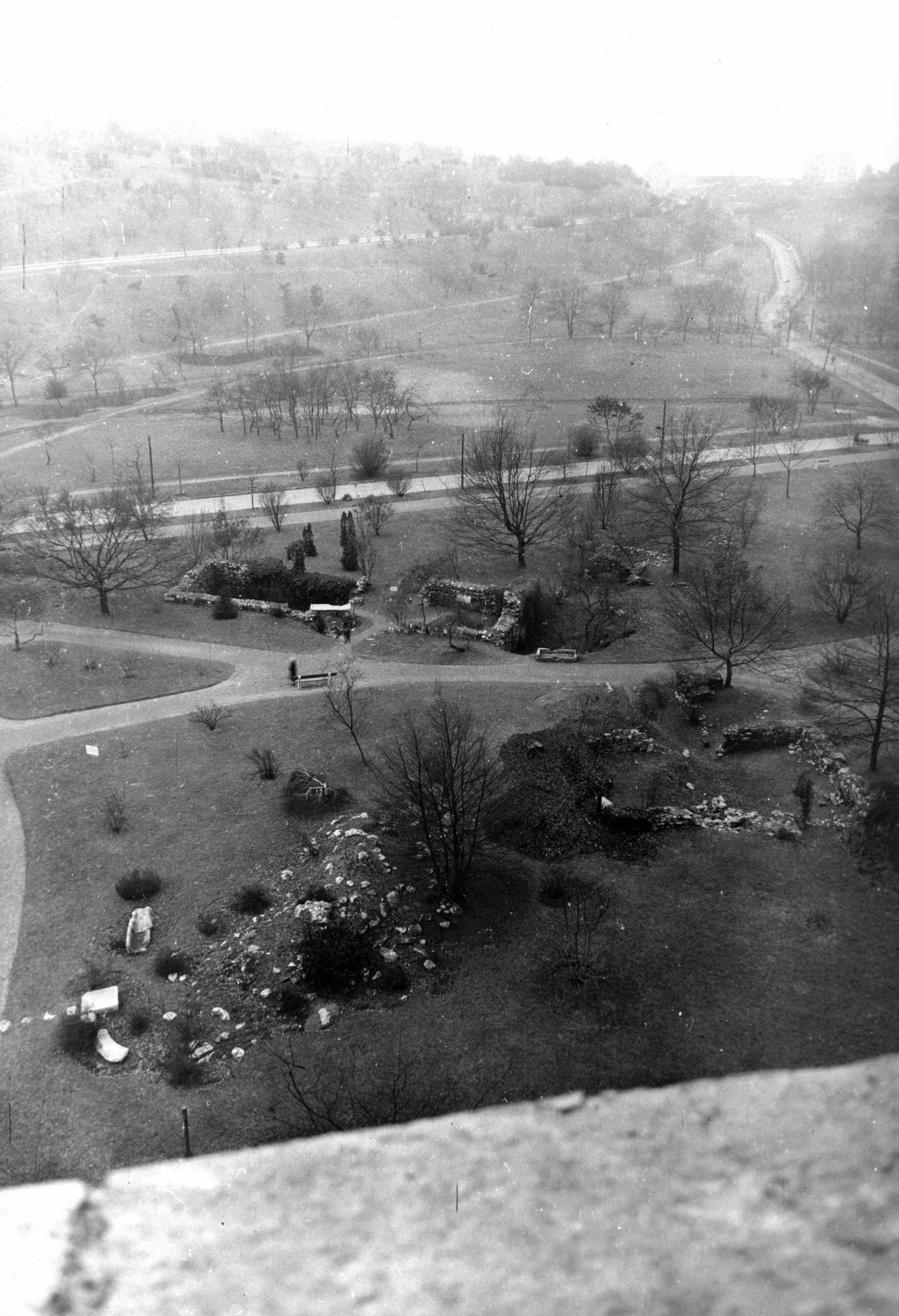
The ruins in 1960 with Building I in the background

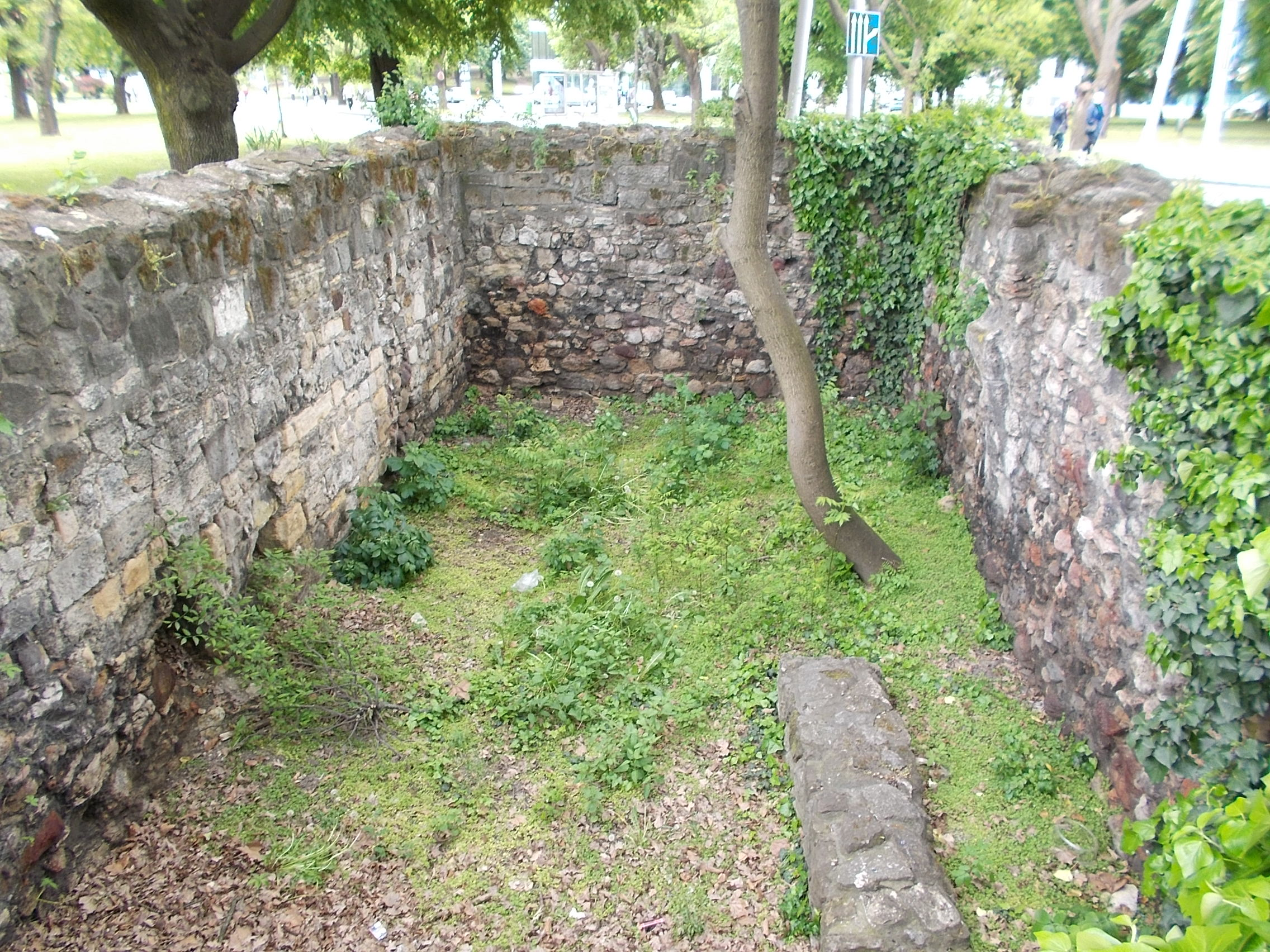
The interior of Building I in 2016

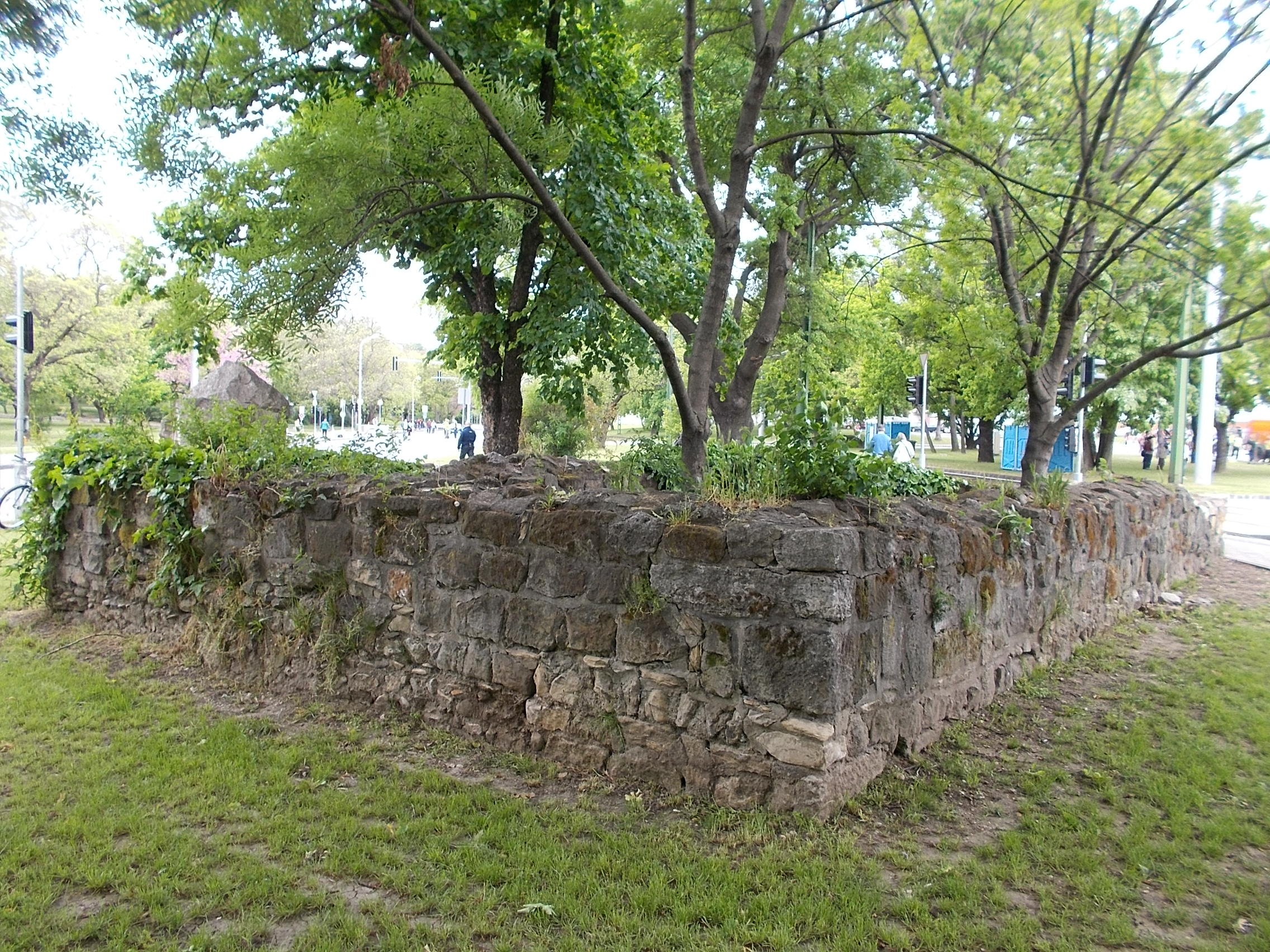
The corner of Building I

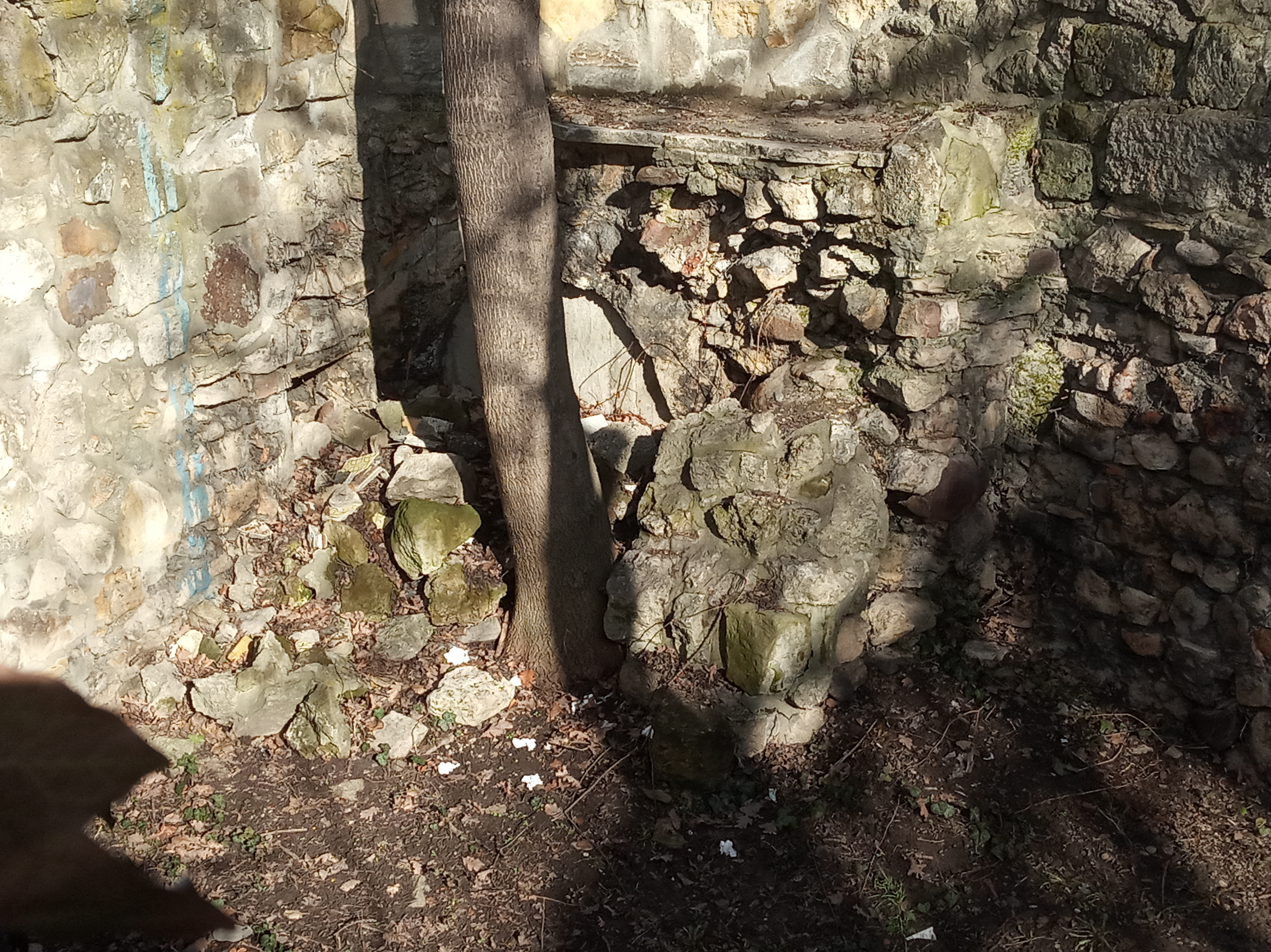
Partition wall inside Building I with a blocked archway and a small window

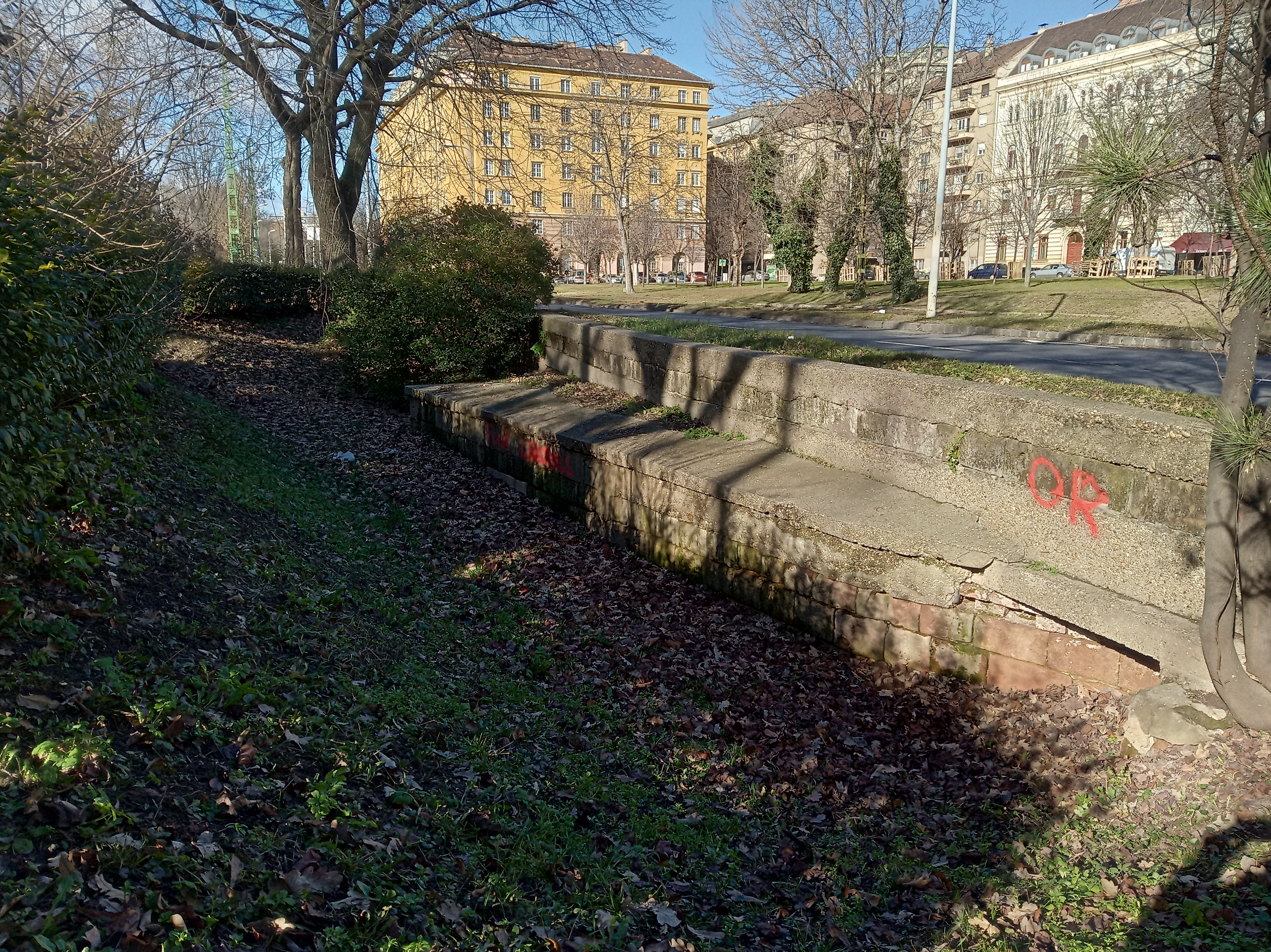
Part of the retaining wall by the Ördög-árok stream

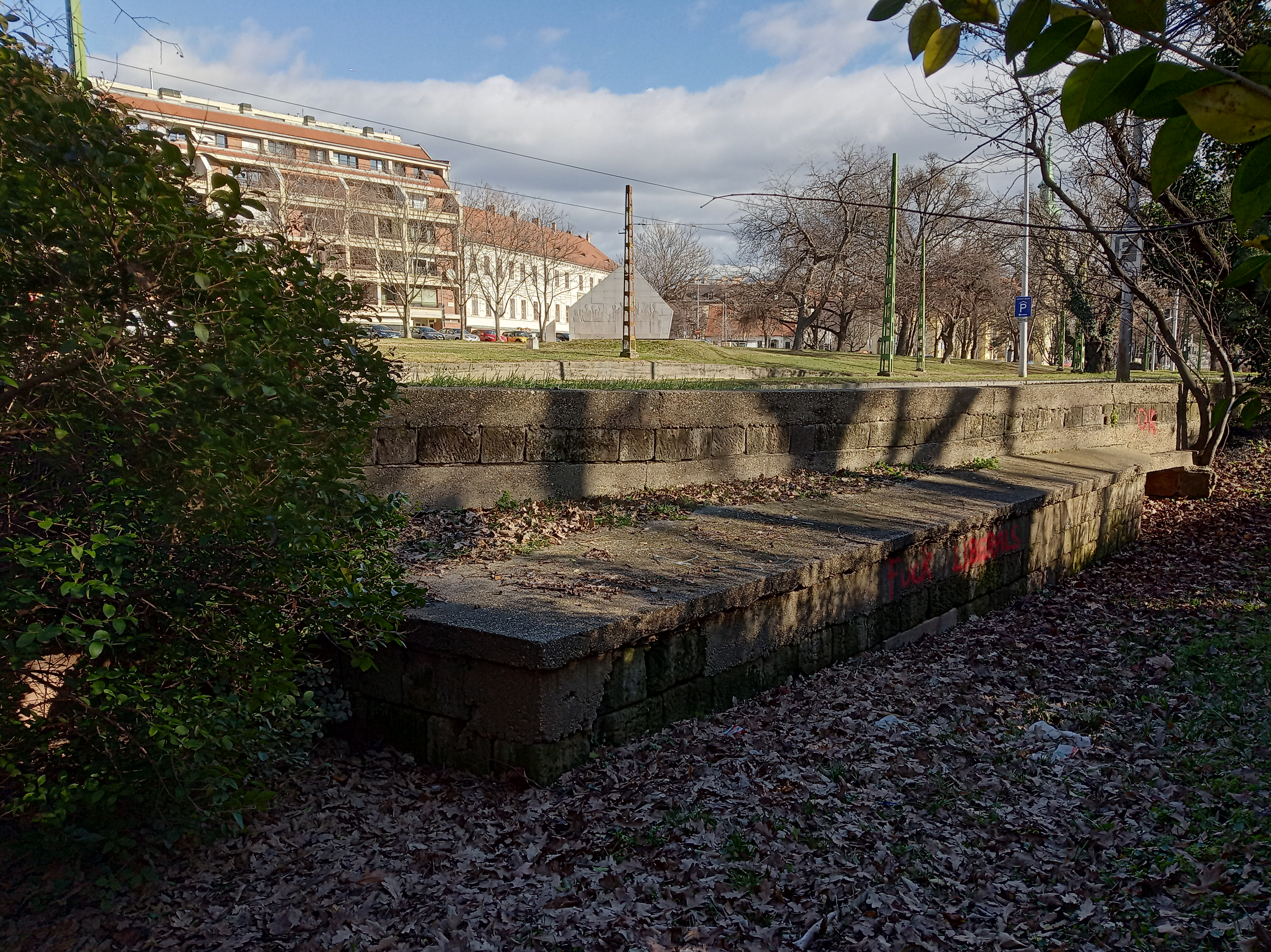
The retaining wall by the Ördög-árok stream buried in a recess

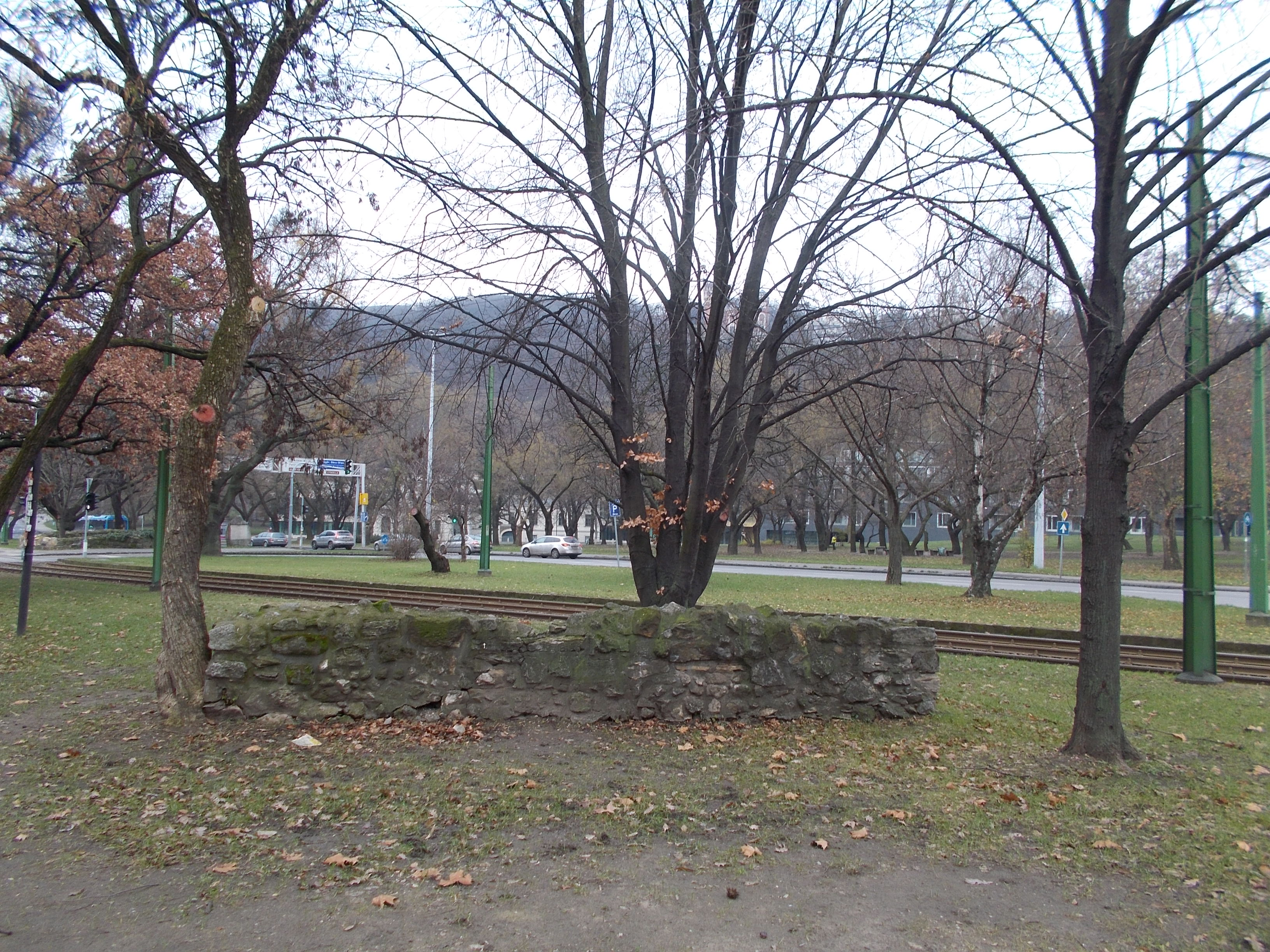
A short section of a medieval wall of an unidentified building

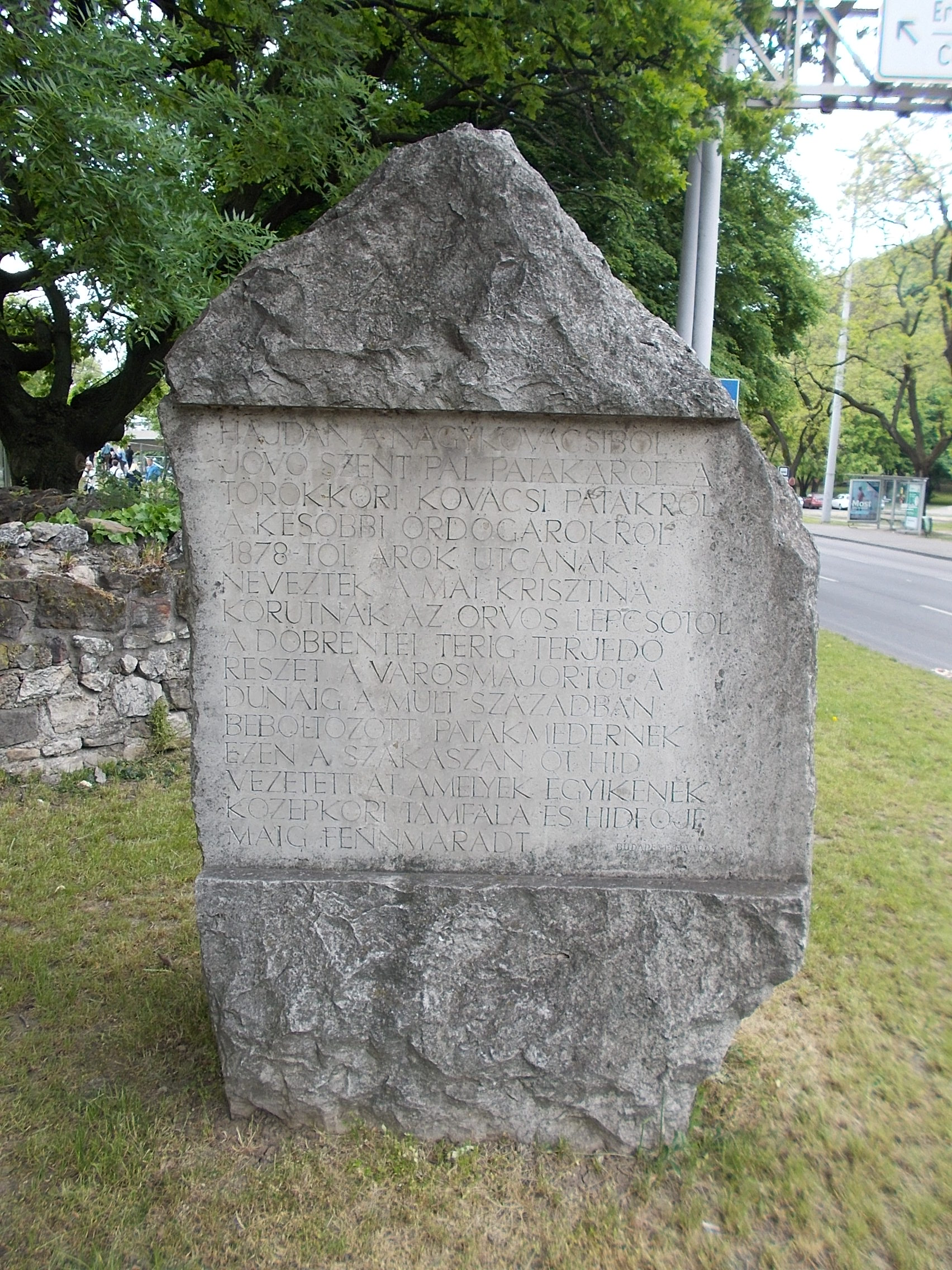
Memorial stone for the Ördög-árok stream, erected in 1970.
