= Nikola Tesla Serbian School =

Coordinates: 47.501461°N 19.076717°E

- Nikola Tesla Szerb Iskola

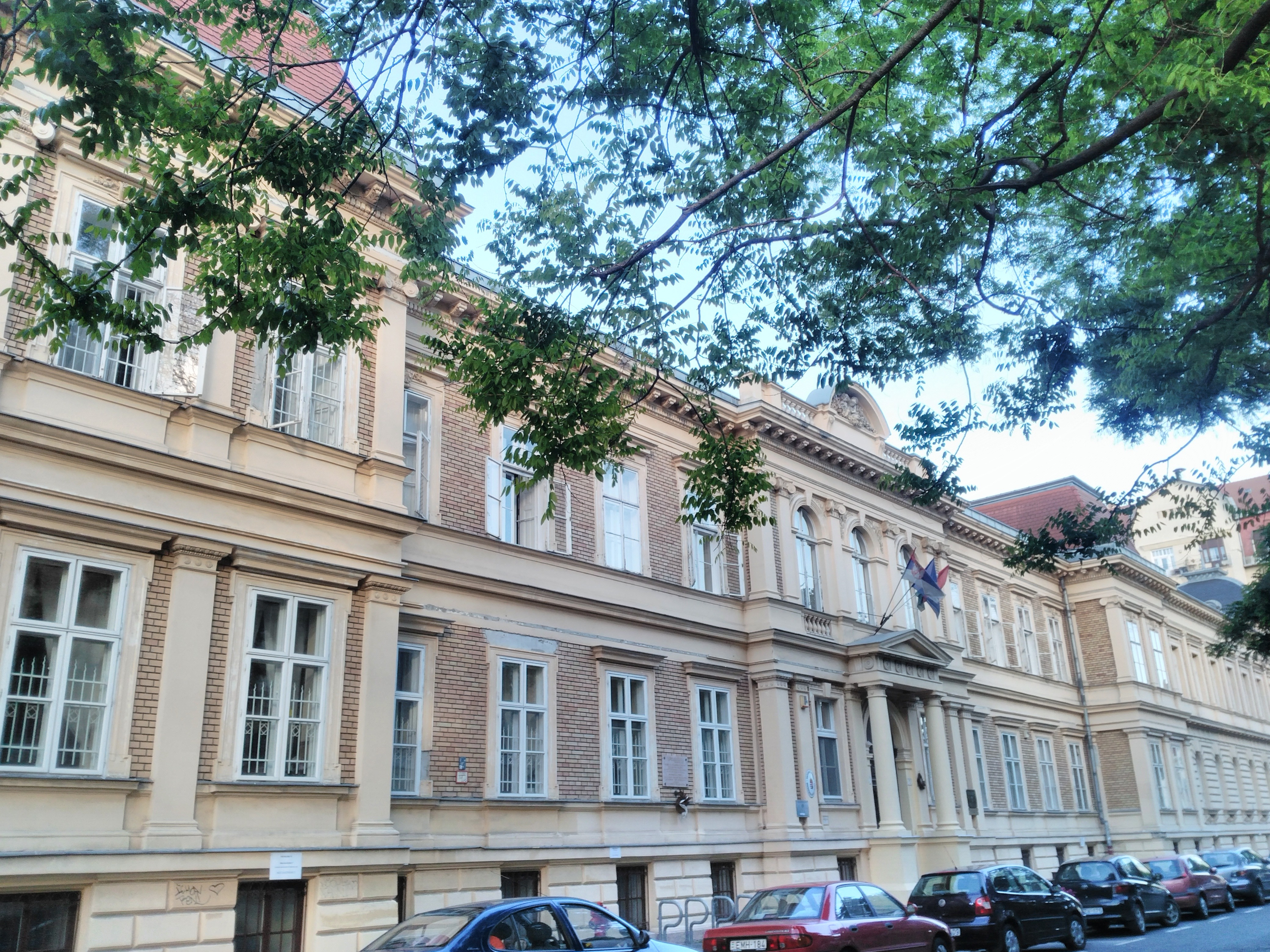
- Rózsák tere 6-7; Budapest 1074; Hungary

Information
- Type: Public school
- Established: 1948; 78 years ago
- Principal: Аница Пандуровић
- Grades: 1–12
- Gender: Co-educational
- Language: Hungarian, Serbian
- Hours in school day: 8 averagely (varies from 7 to 9, 45-minute lectures)
- Campus: Urban
- Colours: Red, Blue and White
- Accreditation: Ministry of Education of Hungary
- Song: Hymn to Saint Sava
- Website: www.nikola-tesla.hu

Nikola Tesla Serbian School (Hungarian: Nikola Tesla Szerb Iskola; Serbian: Српскa школа "Никола Тесла"), now officially known as Serbian Kindergarten, Primary School, High School and Students' Home (Hungarian: Szerb Tanítási Nyelvű Óvoda, Általános Iskola Diákotthon, és Gimnázium; Serbian: Српско забавиште, основна школа, ђачки дом и гимназија), is an educational institution located in Budapest, Hungary.

It was established as a school for all South Slavic nations in 1948. The school began its work in Pécs, but was soon out of political reasons, moved to Budapest. The school later replaced the name South Slavic with Serbian and Croatian. In 1993, as a result of the Yugoslav Wars, the Croatian component was removed from the school’s name. In 2012, the Serbian president Tomislav Nikolić visited the school.

== Alumni ==
- Radovan Jelašić, Governor of the National Bank of Serbia from 2004 to 2010
- Church of St. George, Budapest

== See also ==
- Serbs of Hungary
