= Amvrosije Janković =

Serbian painter-iconographer

Ambrozije or Amvrosije Janković (Serbian Cyrillic: Амброзије/Амвросије Јанковић; born around 1730) was a Serbian painter-iconographer.

== Life and work ==
Janković was born in Sečuj, a village in Hungary. He was educated at Szentendre in the Seminary of Bishop Vasilije Dimitrijević (1728–1748) of the Eparchy of Buda and then went to study art at the atelier of Jov Vasilijevič in Sremski Karlovci.

In 1760 he became a monk and settled in the Rakovac Monastery, located in Srem, where he wrote that he was an artist and icon painter and that in 1760 he received 6 ducats in prize money for his work. He learned his art under the tutelage of Baroque painter Jov Vasiljevič who was the court painter of Patriarch Arsenije IV Jovanović Šakabenta. In the church in Kamenica he painted in 1760, the Annunciation, Christ and the Mother of God, the Coronation of the Mother of God, and the Hymn of the Mother of God: O Tebje Raduljetsja. Afterward, he worked at Vukovar and Rakovica Monastery, his most important work.

It is known that in late 1771 he started painting in the dining room of the Vrdnik Monastery on the theme of the Battle of Kosovo, which he painted and finished in 1776 after more than four years of work. It is one of the most interesting works of the last of monk-painters, of this new style.

Stylistically Ambrozije Janković's frescoes have both the elements of medieval and Baroque painting, giving him an honored place in the line of great Serbian artists Jakov Orfelin, Zaharije Orfelin, Teodor Kračun, Teodor Ilić Češljar and other academy-educated painters of that time.

== See also ==
- List of painters from Serbia
